= List of Argentine submissions for the Academy Award for Best International Feature Film =

Best International Feature Film submissions from Argentina

Highlights
- Debut: 1961
- Submissions: 53
- Nominations: 8
- Oscar winners: 2

Argentina has submitted films for the Academy Award for Best International Feature Film (Note: The category was previously named the Academy Award for Best Foreign Language Film, but this was changed to the Academy Award for Best International Feature Film in April 2019, after the Academy deemed the word "Foreign" to be outdated.) since 1961. The award is handed out annually by the United States Academy of Motion Picture Arts and Sciences to a feature-length motion picture produced outside the United States that contains primarily non-English dialogue. The award was not created until the 1956 Academy Awards, in which a competitive Academy Award of Merit, known as the Best Foreign Language Film Award, was created for non-English speaking films, and has been given annually since.

As of 2026, Argentina has been nominated eight times, winning twice for Luis Puenzo's The Official Story (1985) and Juan José Campanella's The Secret in Their Eyes (2009).

== Submissions ==
The Academy of Motion Picture Arts and Sciences has invited the film industries of various countries to submit their best film for the Academy Award for Best International Feature Film since 1956. The Best International Feature Film Committee oversees the process and reviews all the submitted films. Following this, they vote via secret ballot to determine the five nominees for the award.

Previously, in 1948, Argentina presented Luis César Amadori's Dios se lo pague as a candidate for the Honorary Award to the best foreign-language film released in the United States, making it the first Argentine film to be sent to the Academy Awards. But the prize was attributed to Monsieur Vincent. These awards were not competitive, as there were no nominees but simply a winner every year that was voted on by the Board of Governors of the Academy.

The Argentina nominee is selected annually by the Academia de las Artes y Ciencias Cinematográficas de la Argentina. The selection committee holds separate votes to decide which film goes to the Oscars and, in a separate vote, which film goes to the Spanish Goya Awards.

Marcelo Piñeyro and Pablo Trapero have been selected three times each, while only Juan José Campanella has managed multiple nominations. Nominated films include: The Truce (1974), Camila (1984), Tango (1998), Son of the Bride (2001), Wild Tales (2014), and Argentina, 1985 (2022).

The Official Story (1985), directed by , was the country first winner at the 58th Academy Awards. Followed by The Secret in Their Eyes (2009), directed by Juan José Campanella, at the 82nd Academy Awards.

Among all the countries that have received the Academy Award for Best International Feature Film, Argentina (with two awards) is one of four Spanish-speaking countries that have done so, alongside Chile (one award), Mexico (one award) and Spain (four awards).

Belén (2025) by Dolores Fonzi made into the fifteen films shortlist, but was not nominated.

All films are primary in Spanish. Below is a list of the films that have been submitted by Argentina for review by the academy for the award by year and the respective Academy Awards ceremony.

Year (Ceremony)	Film title used in nomination	Original title	Language(s)	Director(s)	Result
1961 (34th)	Summer Skin	Piel de verano	Spanish	Leopoldo Torre Nilsson	Not nominated
1962 (35th)	The Sad Young Men	Los jóvenes viejos	Spanish	Rodolfo Kuhn	Not nominated
1965 (38th)	Pajarito Gómez		Spanish	Rodolfo Kuhn	Not nominated
1974 (47th)	The Truce	La tregua	Spanish	Sergio Renán	Nominated
1975 (48th)	Nazareno Cruz and the Wolf	Nazareno Cruz y el lobo, las palomas y los gritos	Spanish, Quechua	Leonardo Favio	Not nominated
1976 (49th)	Yesterday's Guys Used No Arsenic	Los muchachos de antes no usaban arsénico	Spanish	José A. Martínez Suárez	Not nominated
1977 (50th)	What Does Fall Mean?	¿Qué es el otoño?	Spanish	David José Kohon	Not nominated
1979 (52nd)	The Island	La isla	Spanish	Alejandro Doria	Not nominated
1981 (54th)	The Underground Man	El hombre del subsuelo	Spanish	Nicolás Sarquís	Not nominated
1982 (55th)	Last Days of the Victim	Últimos días de la víctima	Spanish	Adolfo Aristarain	Not nominated
1984 (57th)	Camila		Spanish	María Luisa Bemberg	Nominated
1985 (58th)	The Official Story	La historia oficial	Spanish	Luis Puenzo	Won Academy Award
1986 (59th)	Tangos, the Exile of Gardel	Tangos, el exilio de Gardel	Spanish, French	Fernando Solanas	Not nominated
1987 (60th)	Man Facing Southeast	Hombre mirando al sudeste	Spanish	Eliseo Subiela	Not nominated
1988 (61st)	Verónico Cruz	La deuda interna	Spanish	Miguel Pereira	Not nominated
1989 (62nd)	The Girlfriend	La amiga	Spanish, German	Jeanine Meerapfel	Not nominated
1990 (63rd)	I, the Worst of All	Yo, la peor de todas	Spanish	María Luisa Bemberg	Not nominated
1991 (64th)	The Tombs	Las tumbas	Spanish	Javier Torre	Not nominated
1992 (65th)	The Dark Side of the Heart	El lado oscuro del corazón	Spanish	Eliseo Subiela	Not nominated (Note: In the same year the Adolfo Aristarain film A Place in the World (1992) obtained a nomination like an Uruguayan film. But after nominations were announced, information came to light that showed that the film was wholly produced in Argentina, and had insufficient Uruguayan artistic control. The film was declared ineligible and removed from the final ballot.)
1993 (66th)	Gatica, el mono		Spanish	Leonardo Favio	Not nominated
1994 (67th)	A Shadow You Soon Will Be	Una sombra ya pronto serás	Spanish	Héctor Olivera	Not nominated
1995 (68th)	Wild Horses	Caballos salvajes	Spanish	Marcelo Piñeyro	Not nominated
1996 (69th)	Eva Perón: The True Story	Eva Perón	Spanish	Juan Carlos Desanzo	Not nominated
1997 (70th)	Ashes of Paradise	Cenizas del paraíso	Spanish	Marcelo Piñeyro	Not nominated
1998 (71st)	Tango	Tango, no me dejes nunca	Spanish	Carlos Saura	Nominated
1999 (72nd)	Manuelita		Spanish	Manuel García Ferré	Not nominated
2000 (73rd)	Merry Christmas	Felicidades	Spanish, Hebrew	Lucho Bender	Not nominated
2001 (74th)	Son of the Bride	El hijo de la novia	Spanish	Juan José Campanella	Nominated
2002 (75th)	Kamchatka		Spanish	Marcelo Piñeyro	Not nominated
2003 (76th)	Valentín		Spanish	Alejandro Agresti	Not nominated
2004 (77th)	Lost Embrace	El abrazo partido	Spanish, Korean, Lithuanian, Yiddish	Daniel Burman	Not nominated
2005 (78th)	The Aura	El aura	Spanish	Fabián Bielinsky	Not nominated
2006 (79th)	Family Law	Derecho de familia	Spanish	Daniel Burman	Not nominated
2007 (80th)	XXY		Spanish	Lucía Puenzo	Not nominated
2008 (81st)	Lion's Den	Leonera	Spanish	Pablo Trapero	Not nominated
2009 (82nd)	The Secret in Their Eyes	El secreto de sus ojos	Spanish	Juan José Campanella	Won Academy Award
2010 (83rd)	Carancho		Spanish	Pablo Trapero	Not nominated
2011 (84th)	Aballay	Aballay, el hombre sin miedo	Spanish	Fernando Spiner	Not nominated
2012 (85th)	Clandestine Childhood	Infancia clandestina	Spanish	Benjamín Ávila	Not nominated
2013 (86th)	The German Doctor	Wakolda	Spanish, German, Hebrew	Lucía Puenzo	Not nominated
2014 (87th)	Wild Tales	Relatos salvajes	Spanish	Damián Szifrón	Nominated
2015 (88th)	The Clan	El clan	Spanish	Pablo Trapero	Not nominated
2016 (89th)	The Distinguished Citizen	El ciudadano ilustre	Spanish	Gastón Duprat & Mariano Cohn	Not nominated
2017 (90th)	Zama		Spanish, Toba Qom, Pilagá, Mbyá Guaraní, Portuguese	Lucrecia Martel	Not nominated
2018 (91st)	El Angel	El Ángel	Spanish	Luis Ortega	Not nominated
2019 (92nd)	Heroic Losers	La odisea de los giles	Spanish	Sebastián Borensztein	Not nominated
2020 (93rd)	The Sleepwalkers	Los sonámbulos	Spanish	Paula Hernández	Not nominated
2021 (94th)	The Intruder	El prófugo	Spanish	Natalia Meta	Not nominated
2022 (95th)	Argentina, 1985		Spanish	Santiago Mitre	Nominated
2023 (96th)	The Delinquents	Los delincuentes	Spanish	Rodrigo Moreno	Not nominated
2024 (97th)	Kill the Jockey	El jockey	Spanish	Luis Ortega	Not nominated
2025 (98th)	Belén		Spanish	Dolores Fonzi	Made shortlist
2026 (99th)	The Virgin of the Quarry Lake	La virgen de la tosquera	Spanish	Laura Casabé	Pending

== Shortlisted films ==
Year	Films
1999	Crane World · Olympic Garage · Same Love, Same Rain
2000	Nine Queens
2001	La ciénaga
2002	El bonaerense · Common Ground · Intimate Stories · Red Bear
2003	Bottom of the Sea · Cleopatra
2004	The Holy Girl · Moon of Avellaneda · El perro
2005	Blessed by Fire · Cama adentro · Whisky Romeo Zulu
2006	The Hands
2007	The Aerial · The Signal
2008	Aniceto
2009	Days of May · The Fish Child · The Widows of Thursdays
2010	Brother and Sister · Eva & Lola · Igualita a mí · It's Your Fault · The Last Summer of La Boyita · The Man Next Door · A Matter of Principles · El mural · No Return · Three Wishes
2011	The Cat Vanishes · Chinese Take-Away · Cowboy · Juan y Eva · Los Marziano · Mount Bayo · The Student · Widows
2012	2+2 · Las Acacias · The Last Elvis · White Elephant
2013	Metegol · Thesis on a Homicide
2015	Abzurdah · No Kids · Papers in the Wind · Paulina
2016	I'm Gilda · Incident Light · The Long Night of Francisco Sanctis · The Tenth Man
2017	A Sort of Family · The Summit · Ten Days Without Mom
2019	Rojo · The Weasel's Tale
2023	Blondi · Puan · The Rescue: The Weight of the World
2024	The Freshly Cut Grass · Most People Die on Sundays · The Practice · Simon of the Mountain · Transmitzvah
2025	Homo Argentum · Something Old, Something New, Something Borrowed · The Woman in the Line
2026	The Match · Our Land · Strangers in the Park

== See also ==
- List of Argentine Academy Award winners and nominees
- List of Academy Award winners and nominees for Best International Feature Film
- List of Academy Award-winning foreign language films
- Cinema of Argentina
