= 19th Sur Awards =

Argentine film awards

- Date: 23 July 2025
- Site: Teatro del Libertador General San Martín, Córdoba, Argentina
- Hosted by: Andrea Frigerio; Martín Bossi
- Organized by: Argentine Academy of Cinematography Arts and Sciences

Highlights
- Best Film: Kill the Jockey
- Best Direction: Luis Ortega; Kill the Jockey
- Best Actor: Nahuel Pérez Biscayart; Kill the Jockey
- Best Actress: Maite Aguilar; Alemania
- Most awards: Kill the Jockey (11)
- Most nominations: Alemania (12)

Television coverage
- Network: TNT, HBO Max

The 19th Sur Awards ceremony, presented by the Argentine Academy of Cinematography Arts and Sciences, was held at the Teatro del Libertador General San Martín in Córdoba on 23 July 2025. The gala was hosted by Andrea Frigerio and Martín Bossi, and it was broadcast on TNT and HBO Max.

Kill the Jockey swept the awards, winning 11 awards, clinching every award category it was nominated for.

== Nominations and winners ==
The winners and nominees are listed as follows:

Best Film: Kill the Jockey; Alemania; The Man Who Loved UFOs; Something Old, Something New, Something Borrowed	Best Debut Film: Alemania; Giants of La Mancha; Simon of the Mountain; The Major Tones
Best Director: Luis Ortega — Kill the Jockey; María Zanetti — Alemania; Diego Lerman — The Man Who Loved UFOs; Hernán Roselli — Something Old, Something New, Something Borrowed	Best Documentary Film: Partió de mí un barco llevándome; Reas; Traslados; Fuck You! El último show
Best Original Screenplay: Fabián Casas, Luis Ortega, Rodolfo Palacios — Kill the Jockey; Adrián Biniez, Diego Lerman — The Man Who Loved UFOs; Iair Said — Most People Die on Sundays; Hernán Rosselli — Something Old, Something New, Something Borrowed	Best Adapted Screenplay: Leonel D'Agostino, Paula Hernández — El viento que arrasa; Sebastián Borensztein, Marcos Osorio Vidal — Rest in Peace; Victoria Hladilo — La culpa de nada
Best Actress: Maite Aguilar — Alemania; Rita Cortese — Most People Die on Sundays; Miranda de la Serna — Alemania; Inés Estévez — Miranda de viernes a lunes	Best Actor: Nahuel Pérez Biscayart — Kill the Jockey; Alfredo Castro — El viento que arrasa; Lorenzo Ferro — Simon of the Mountain; Leonardo Sbaraglia — The Man Who Loved UFOs
Best Supporting Actress: María Ucedo — Alemania; Alejandra Flechner — Las corredoras; Elvira Onetto — Miranda de viernes a lunes; Antonia Zegers — Most People Die on Sundays	Best Supporting Actor: Daniel Fanego — Kill the Jockey; Gabriel Goity — Rest in Peace; Walter Jakob — Alemania; Sergio Prina — The Man Who Loved UFOs
Best New Actress: Maite Aguilar — Alemania; Melanie Chong — Partió de mí un barco llevándome; Juliana Gattas — Most People Die on Sundays; Luciana Grasso — Miranda de viernes a lunes	Best New Actor: Pehuén Pedre — Simon of the Mountain; Joaquín Acebo — El viento que arrasa; Milo Lis — Campamento con mamá; Leandro Menéndez — Something Old, Something New, Something Borrowed
Best Cinematography: Timo Salminen — Kill the Jockey; Agustín Barrutia — Alemania; Horacio Maira — Goyo; Nicolás Gorla — Búfalo	Best Costume Design: Beatriz Di Benedetto — Kill the Jockey; Mónica Toschi — El viento que arrasa; Patricia Conta — Alemania; Valentina Bari, Pheonia Veloz — The Man Who Loved UFOs
Best Art Direction: Julia Freid, Germán Naglieri — Kill the Jockey; Micaela Saiegh — Alemania; Marcelo Chaves — The Man Who Loved UFOs; Daniel Gimelberg — Transmitzvah	Best Original Score: Sune Rose Wagner — Kill the Jockey; Pablo Borghi — Giants of La Mancha; Gustavo Pomeranec — El agrónomo; Pablo Borghi — Campamento con mamá
Best Makeup and Characterization: Ángela Garacija — Kill the Jockey; Silvina Paolucci, Jonatan Horne — Alemania; Carolina Siliguini, Beatushka Wojotovicz — The Man Who Loved UFOs; Alberto Moccia — Transmitzvah	Best Editing: Jimena García Molt, Hernán Rosselli, Federico Rotstein — Something Old, Something New, Something Borrowed; Federico Rotstein — The Man Who Loved UFOs; Florencia Gómez García — El agrónomo; Ariel Frajnd — Campamento con mamá
Best Sound: Guido Berenblum, Claus Lynge, Javier Umpiérrez — Kill the Jockey; Catriel Vildosola — El viento que arrasa; Celeste Contratti, Gustavo Pomeranec, Adrián Rodríguez — El agrónomo; Sebastián González, Rubén Piputto — Campamento con mamá	Best Fiction Series: Coppola, el representante; Cromañón; Cris Miró (Ella); El encargado (S3)
Best Animation Film: Giants of La Mancha; El éxito del amor; Robotia, la película; Dalia y el libro rojo	Best Ibero-American Film: I'm Still Here (Brazil); Grand Tour (Portugal); Undercover (Spain); The Echo (Mexico)
