= 13th Platino Awards =

2026 film and television awards ceremony

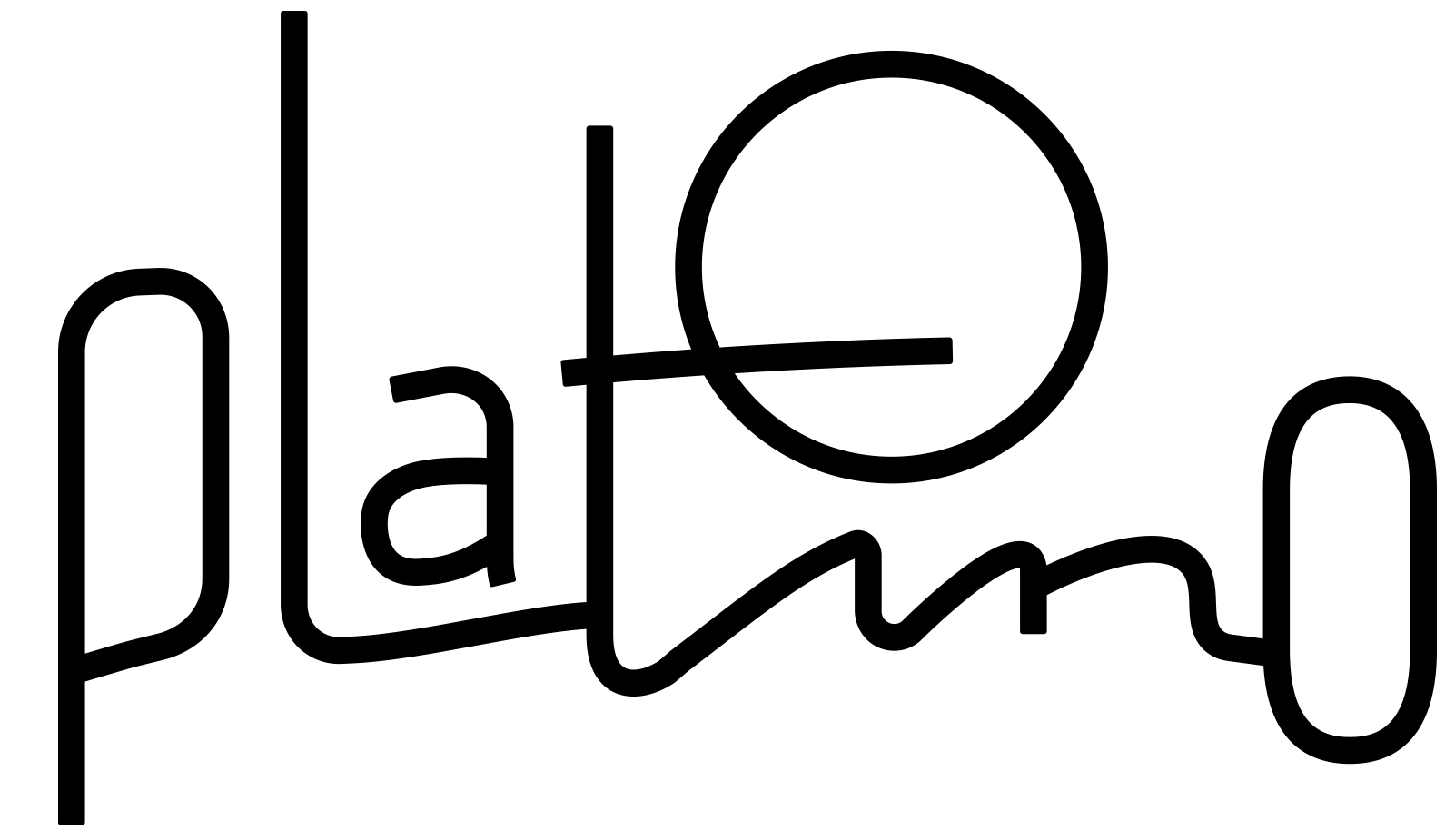
- Date: 9 May 2026
- Site: Teatro Gran Tlachco, Xcaret, Riviera Maya, Mexico
- Hosted by: Carlos Torres; Cayetana Guillén Cuervo

Highlights
- Most awards: Film: The Secret Agent (7); Series: The Eternaut (8)
- Most nominations: Film: Belén, Sundays (11); Series: The Eternaut (13)

Television coverage
- Network: TNT Latam; Max; Telemundo; Universo; La 2

The 13th Platino Awards, presented by the Entidad de Gestión de Derechos de los Productores Audiovisuales (EGEDA) and the Federación Iberoamericana de Productores Cinematográficos y Audiovisuales (FIPCA), took place on 9 May 2026 at Teatro Gran Tlachco in Riviera Maya, Mexico, and recognized excellence in Ibero-American film and television of 2025.

The ceremony was broadcast on TNT Latam and Max in Latin America, La 2 in Spain, and Telemundo and Universo in the United States. Colombian actor Carlos Torres and Spanish actress and television presenter Cayetana Guillén Cuervo served as the hosts for the ceremony.

== Background ==
The 2026 edition will take place at Teatro Gran Tlachco in Riviera Maya, Mexico, being the fourth time the ceremony is held at said location, the last time being in 2024. As a part of an agreement, the host city for the ceremony alternates between Madrid and Riviera Maya (Quintana Roo) from 2024 to 2027.

In October 2025, it was announced that the number of categories would increase from 23 to 35, with most of these categories introduced being technical awards. These categories are three for film: Best Costume Design, Best Special Effects, Best Make-up & Hairstyling; and nine for television productions: Best Long-Form Series, Best Original Score for a Miniseries or TV series, Best Editing for a Miniseries or TV series, Best Art Direction for a Miniseries or TV series, Best Cinematography for a Miniseries or TV series, Best Sound for a Miniseries or TV series, Best Costume Design for a Miniseries or TV series, Best Special Effects for a Miniseries or TV series, Best Make-up and Hairstyling for a Miniseries or TV series.

The nominations were revealed during an event held at Telemundo Center in Miami on March 20, 2026. Argentine legal drama Belén and Spanish drama Sundays led the film categories with eleven nominations each, followed by The Secret Agent with eight and Sirāt with seven. In the television categories, Argentine science-fiction series The Eternaut led with thirteen nominations follwoed by Spanish limited series The Anatomy of a Moment with eleven.

In April 2026, Guillermo Francella was announced the recipient of the Platino Honorary Award.

Winners in some of the categories were announced ahead of the ceremony.

== Nominations ==
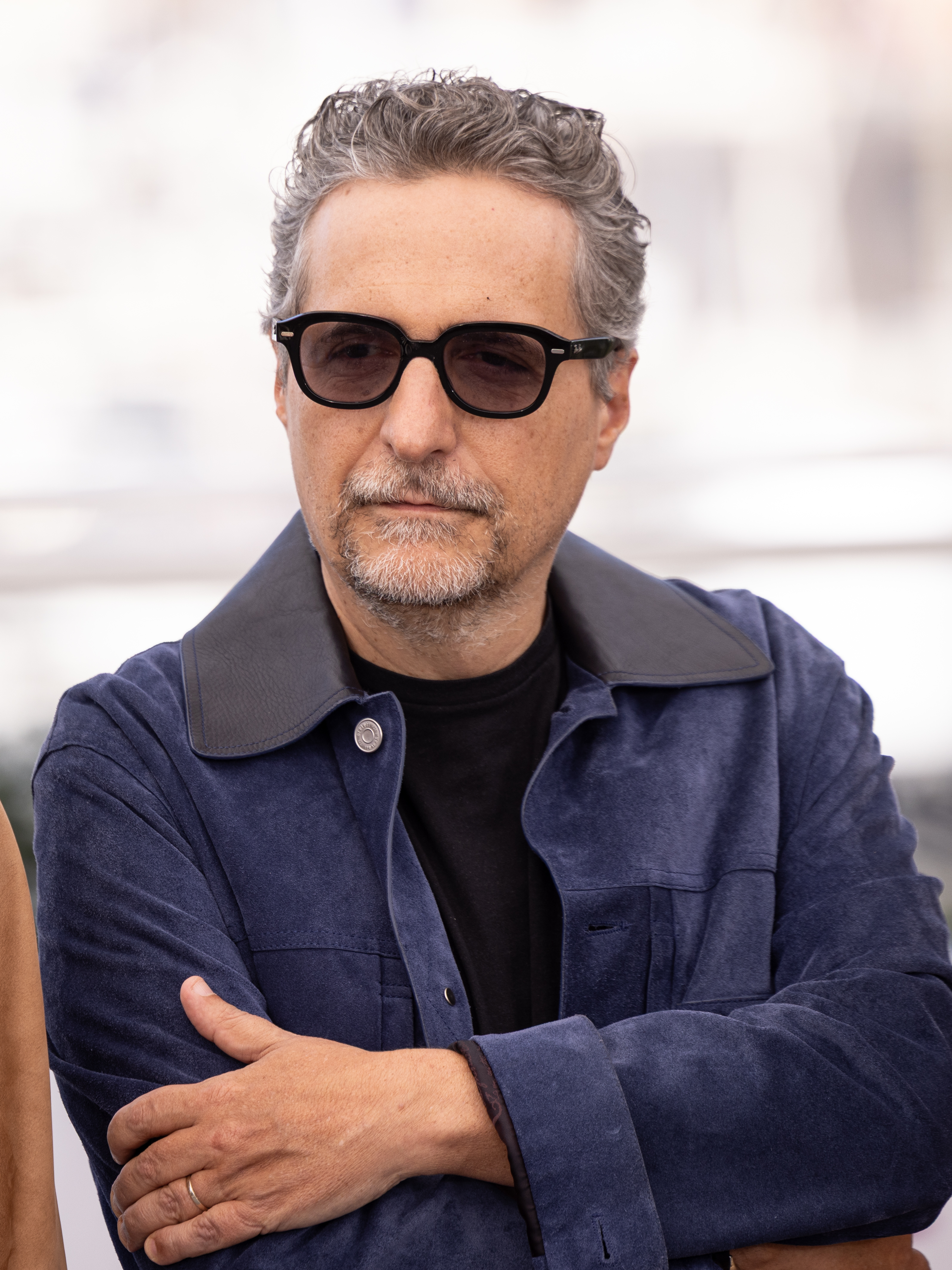
Kleber Mendonça Filho, Best Director and Best Screenplay winner.

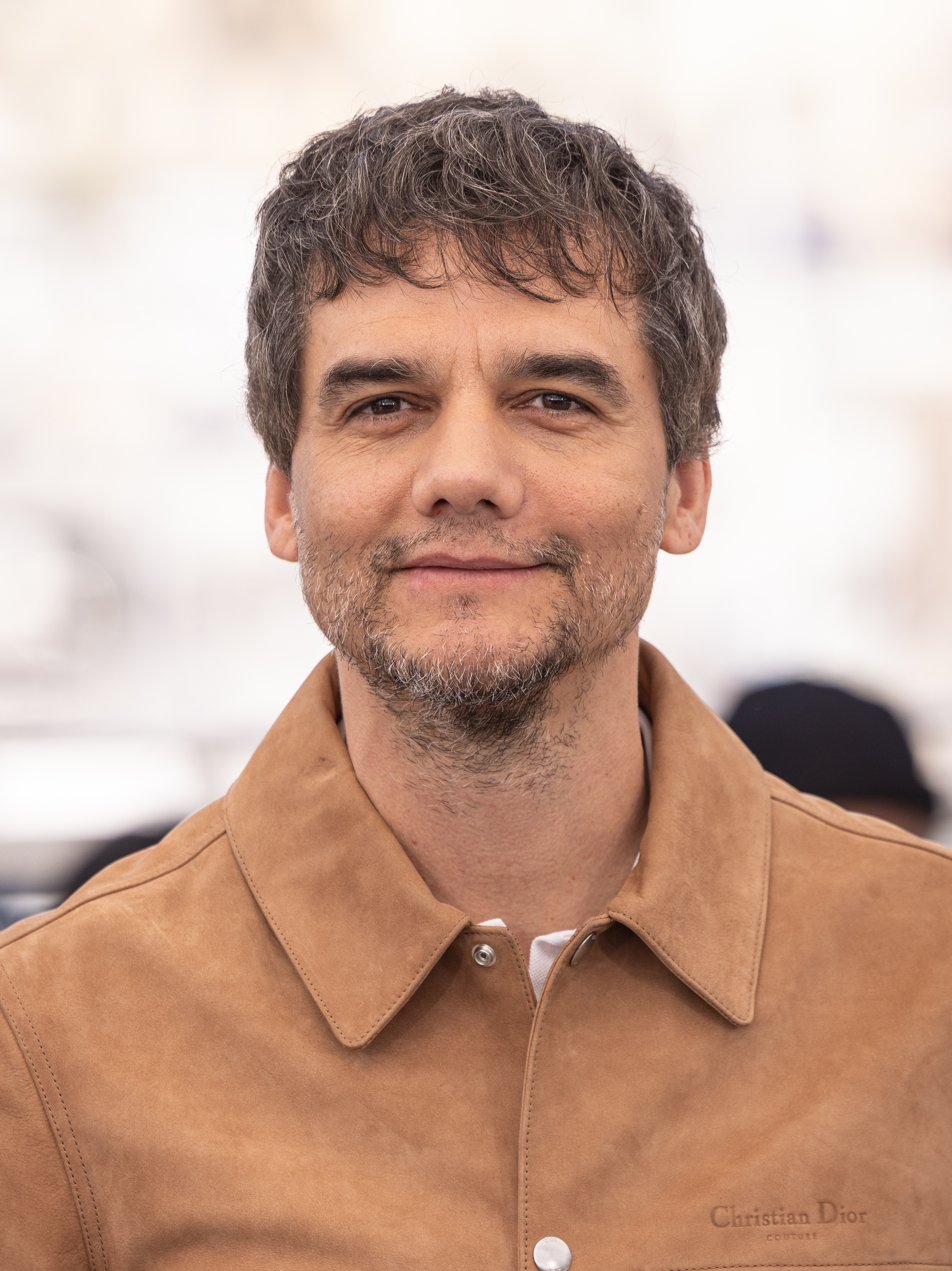
Wagner Moura, Best Actor winner.

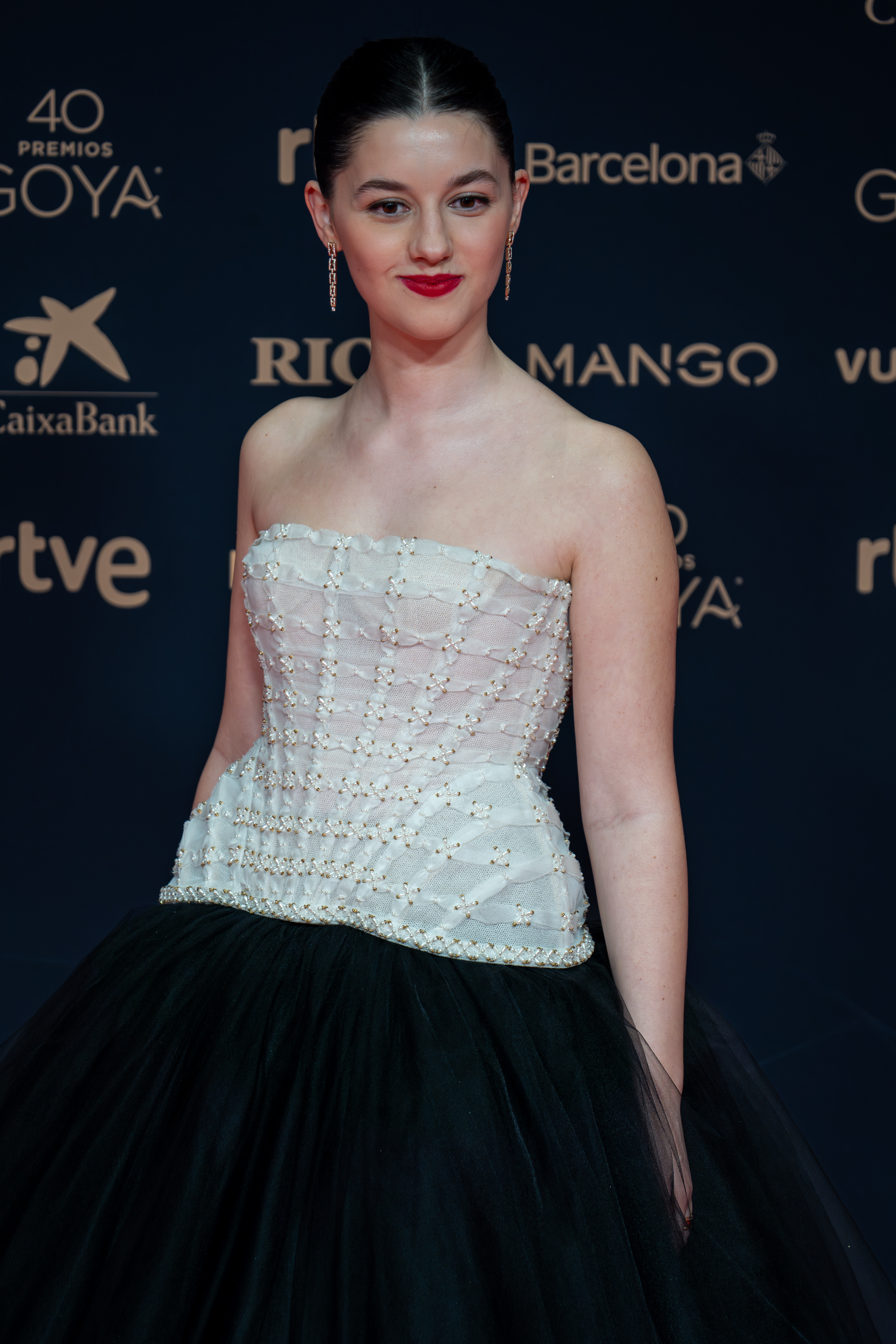
Blanca Soroa, Best Actress winner.

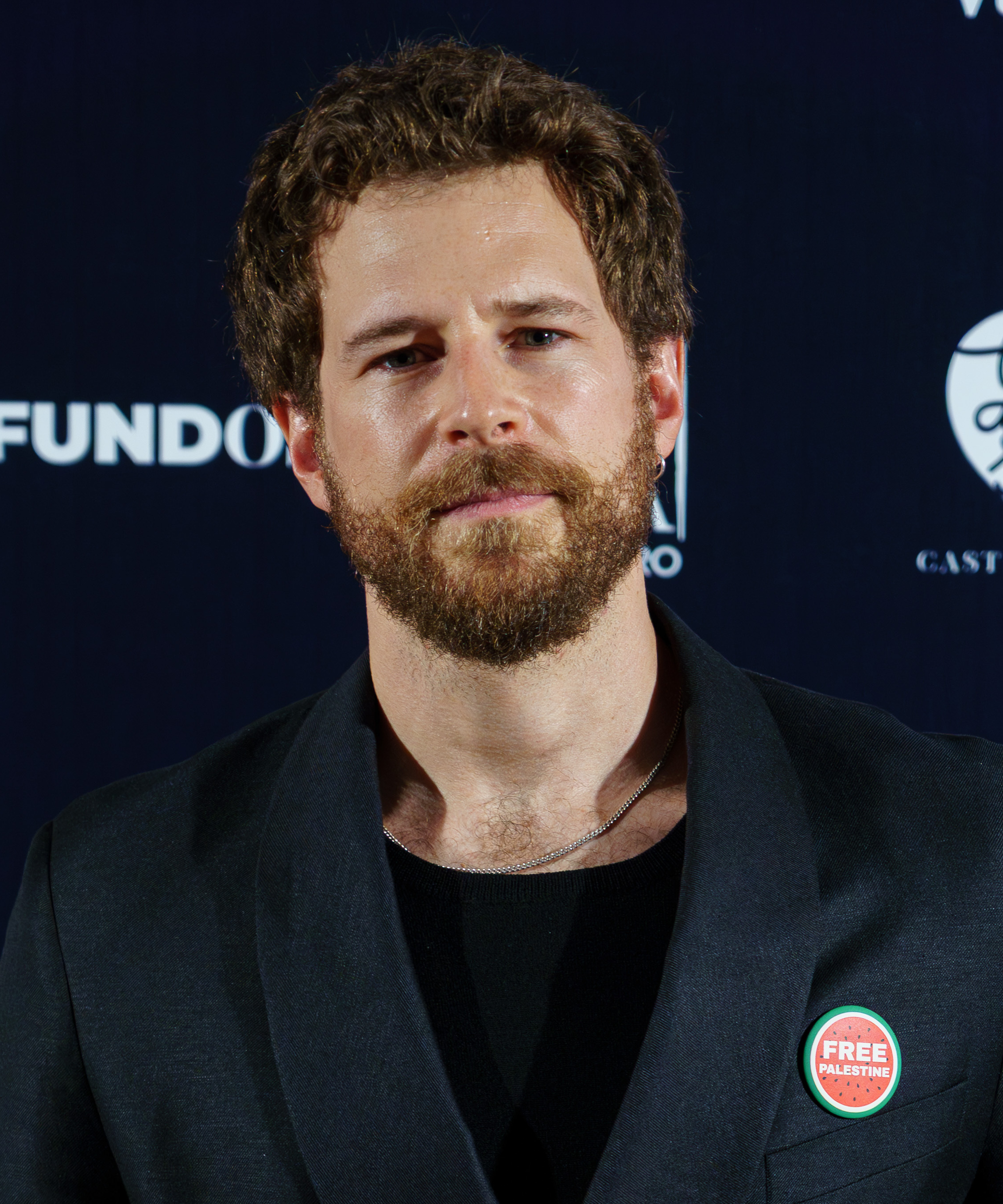
Álvaro Cervantes, Best Supporting Actor winner.

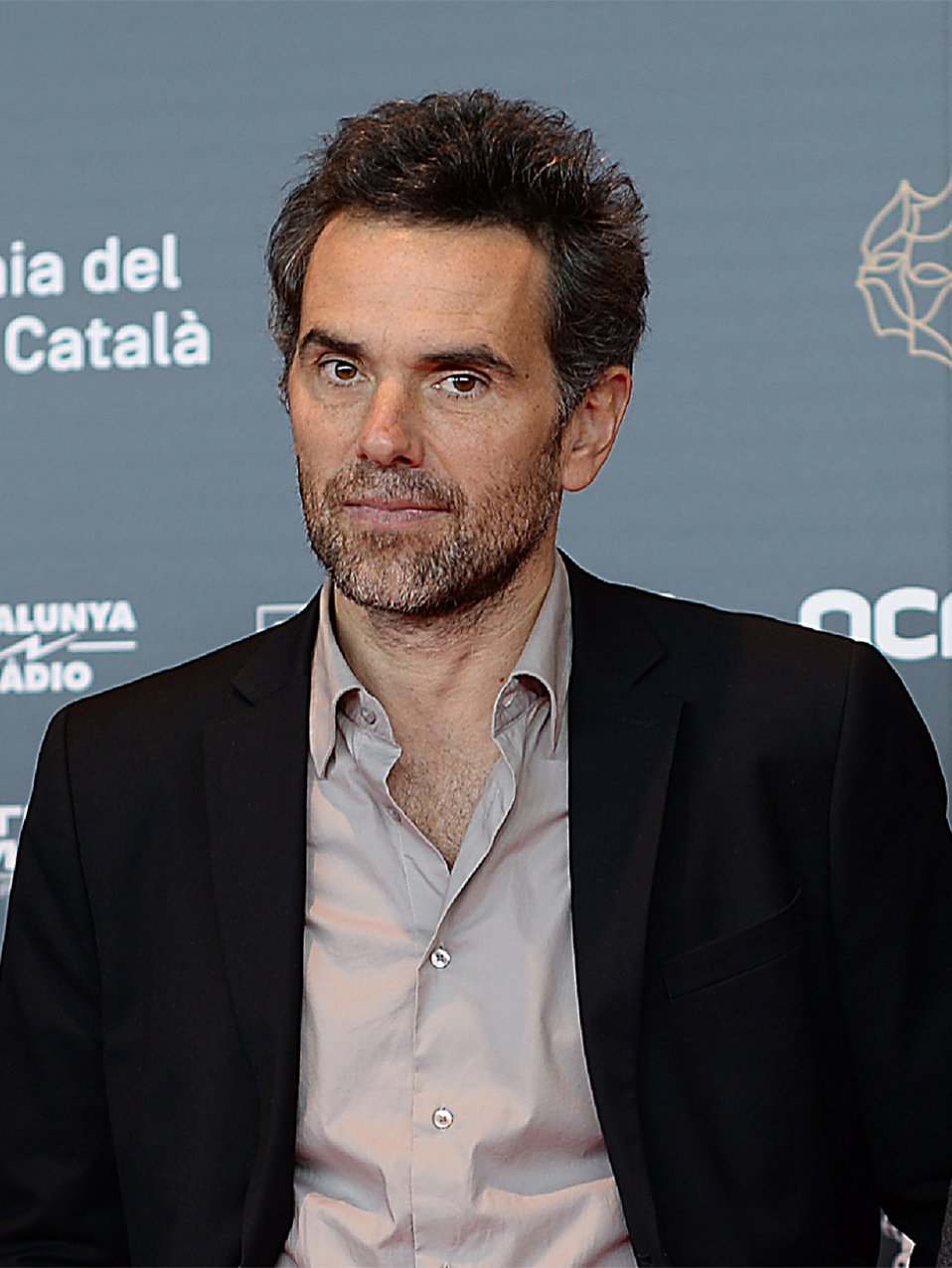
Mauro Herce, Best Cinematography winner.

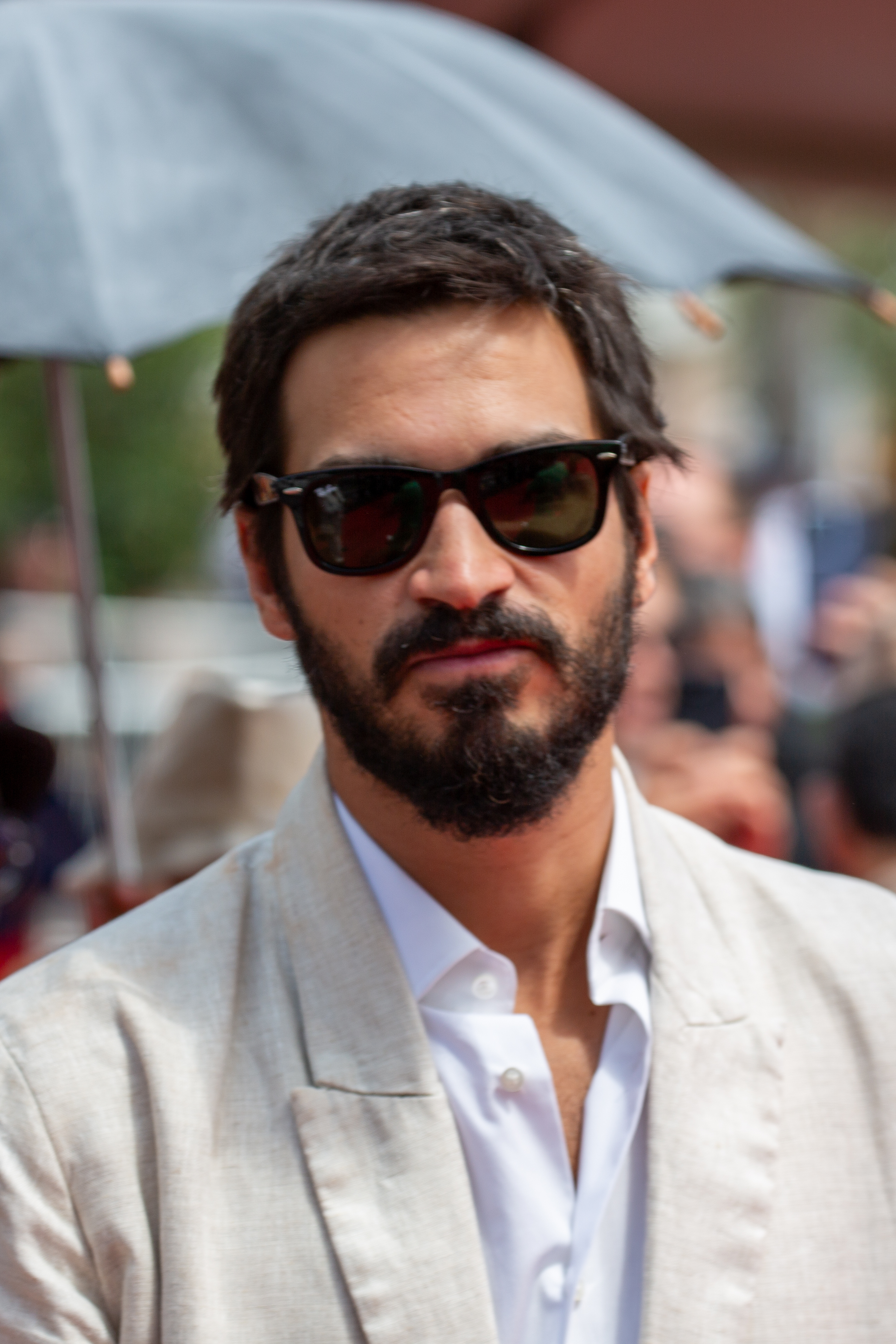
Thales Junqueira, Best Art Direction winner.

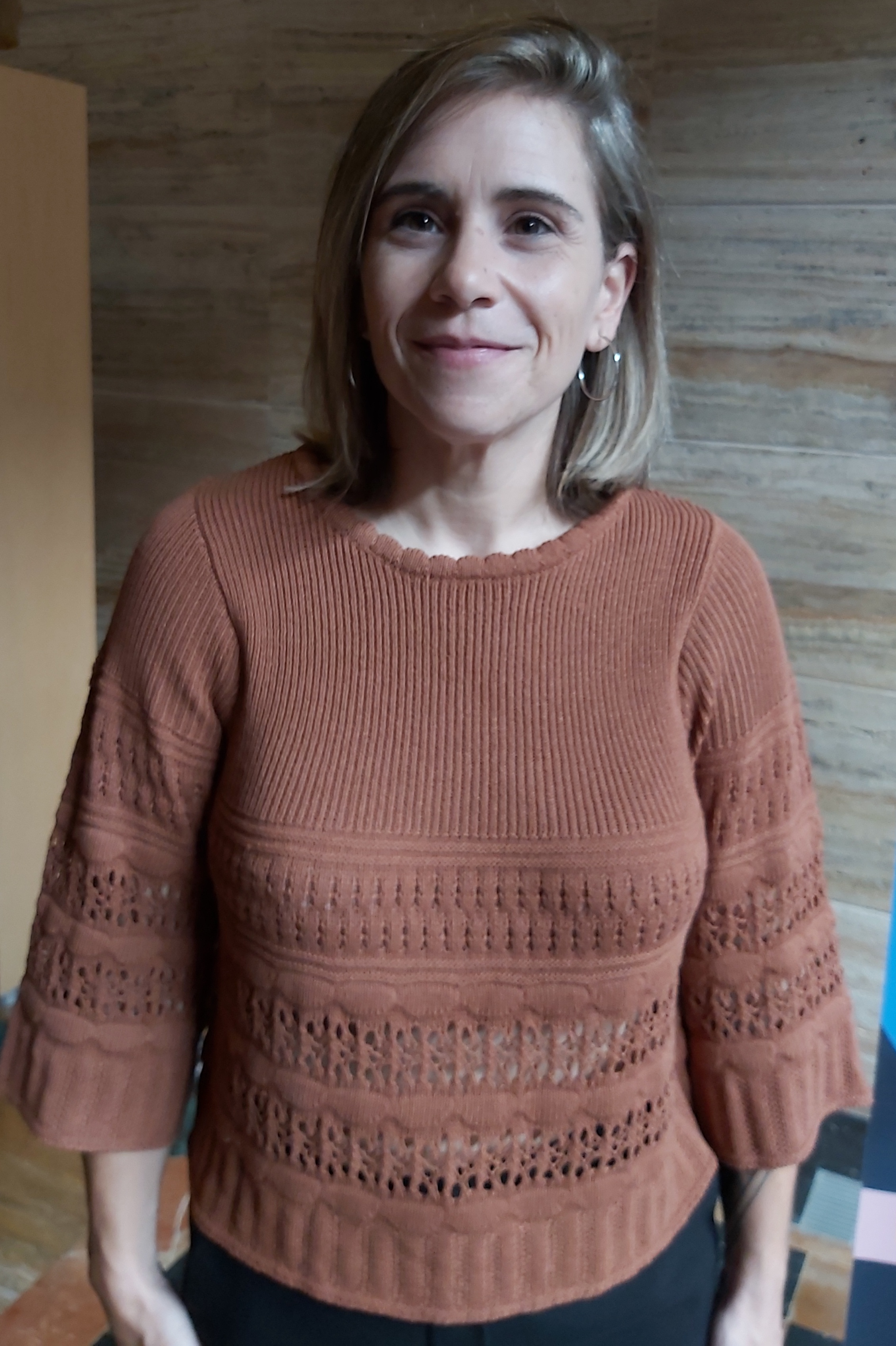
Yasmina Praderas, Best Sound co-winner.

The winners and nominees of the film categories are listed as follows:

=== Film ===
Best Ibero-American Film: The Secret Agent; It Would Be Night in Caracas; Belén; Sundays; Sirāt	Best Director: Kleber Mendonça Filho – The Secret Agent; Alauda Ruiz de Azúa – Sundays; Dolores Fonzi – Belén; Oliver Laxe – Sirāt
Best Actor: Wagner Moura – The Secret Agent as Armando Solimões / Marcelo Alves and Fernando Solimões (adult); Alberto San Juan – The Dinner as Genaro; Guillermo Francella – Homo Argentum as various characters; Ubeimar Ríos Gómez – A Poet as Oscar Restrepo	Best Actress: Blanca Soroa – Sundays as Ainara; Dolores Fonzi – Belén as Soledad Deza; Natalia Reyes – It Would Be Night in Caracas as Adelaida; Patricia López Arnaiz – Sundays as Maite
Best Supporting Actor: Álvaro Cervantes – Deaf as Héctor; Edgar Ramírez – It Would Be Night in Caracas as Francisco; Juan Minujín – Sundays as Pablo; Rodrigo Santoro – The Blue Trail as Cadu	Best Supporting Actress: Camila Pláate – Belén as Julieta; Dira Paes – Manas as Aretha; Julieta Cardinali – Belén as Beatriz Camaño; Nagore Aranburu – Sundays as madre priora Isabel
Best Screenplay: Kleber Mendonça Filho – The Secret Agent; Alauda Ruiz de Azúa – Sundays; Oliver Laxe, Santiago Fillol – Sirāt; Simón Mesa Soto – A Poet	Best Original Score: Tomaz Alves Souza, Mateus Alves – The Secret Agent; Alejandro Rivas Cottle, Gonzalo Pardo – El último blues del croata; Aránzazu Calleja – Maspalomas; Matti Bye, Trio Ramberget – A Poet
Best Animated Film: Olivia & the Clouds; Decorado; Kayara; I Am Frankelda	Best Documentary Film: Apocalypse in the Tropics; Under the Flags, the Sun; Flores para Antonio; Afternoons of Solitude
Best Cinematography: Mauro Herce – Sirāt; Bet Rourich – Sundays; Javier Juliá – Belén; Juan Sarmiento Grisales – A Poet	Best Art Direction: Thales Junqueira – The Secret Agent; Bernardita Baeza – The Mysterious Gaze of the Flamingo; Koldo Vallés – The Dinner; Micaela Saiegh – Belén
Best Film Editing: Eduardo Serrano, Matheus Farias – The Secret Agent; Andrés Gil – Sundays; Cristóbal Fernández – Sirāt; Ricardo Saraiva – A Poet	Best Sound: Amanda Villavieja, Laia Casanovas, Yasmina Praderas – Sirāt; Eduardo Cáceres – Cordillera de fuego; Leandro de Loredo – Belén; Urko Garai, Enrique G. Bermejo, Alejandro Castillo – Deaf
Best Costume Design: Helena Sanchis – The Dinner; Ana Martínez Fesser – Sundays; Lucía Gasconi, Greta Ure – Belén; Rita Azevedo – The Secret Agent	Best Makeup and Hairstyles: Ana López-Puigcerver, Belén López-Puigcerver, Nacho Díaz – The Captive; Ainhoa Eskisabel, Jone Gabarain – Sundays; Martín Macías Trujillo – O Filho de Mil Homens; Leandro de Loredo – Belén; Nuno Esteves "Blue", Teresa Dias – As meninas exemplares
Best Special Effects: Pep Claret – Sirāt; Ana Rubio, Paula Gallifa Rubia – Los Tigres; Bruno Faucelgia, Lucas Di Rago, Mariano Segat – Belén; Raúl Luna, Paula Siqueira – It Would Be Night in Caracas	Best Ibero-American Debut Film: Deaf; The Mysterious Gaze of the Flamingo; Manas; We Shall Not Be Moved
Best Ibero-American Comedy Film: The Dinner; Homo Argentum; A Loose End; A Poet	Film and Values Education: Belén; The Woman in the Line; Manas; Deaf

=== Television ===
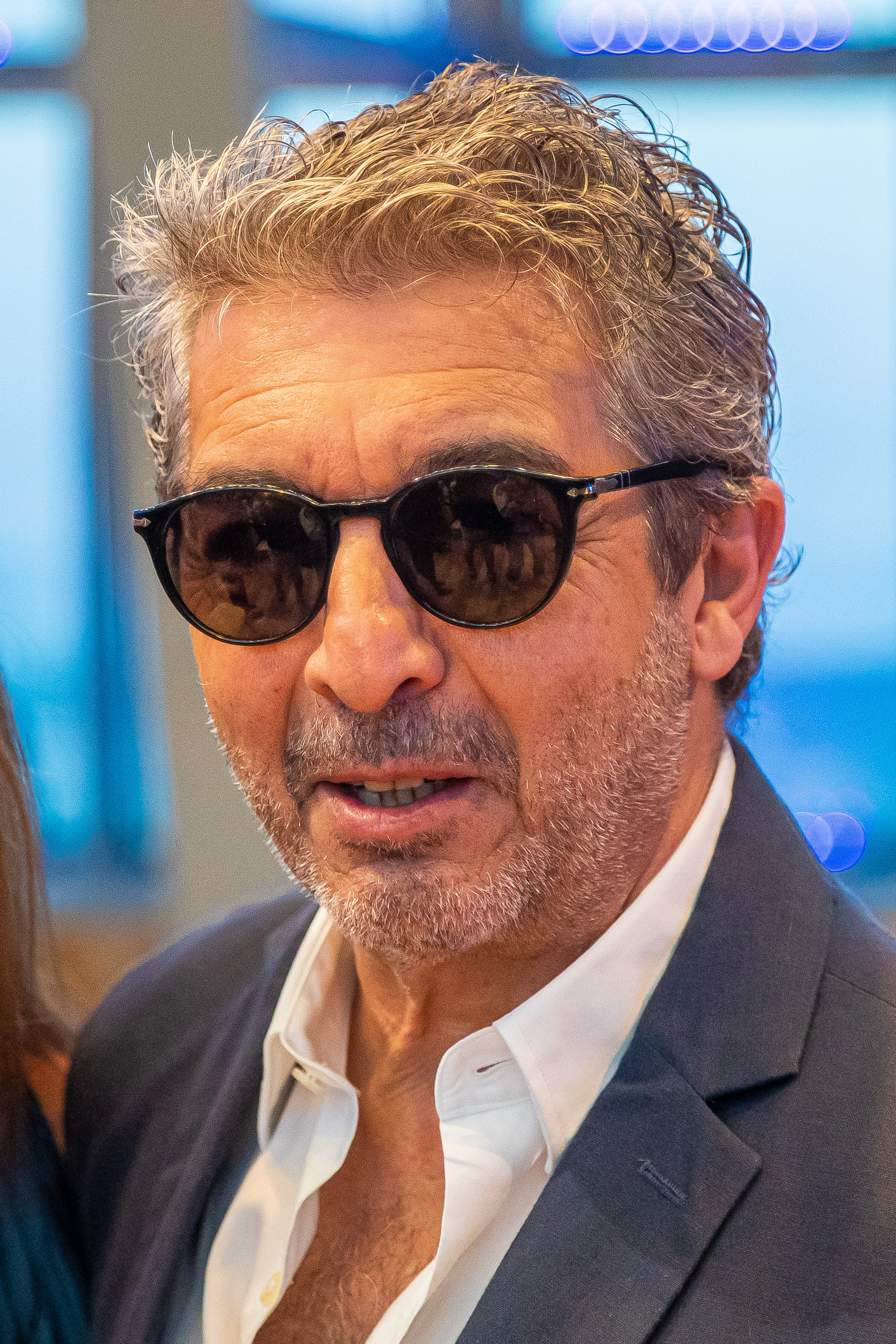
Ricardo Darín, Best Actor in a Miniseries or TV series winner.

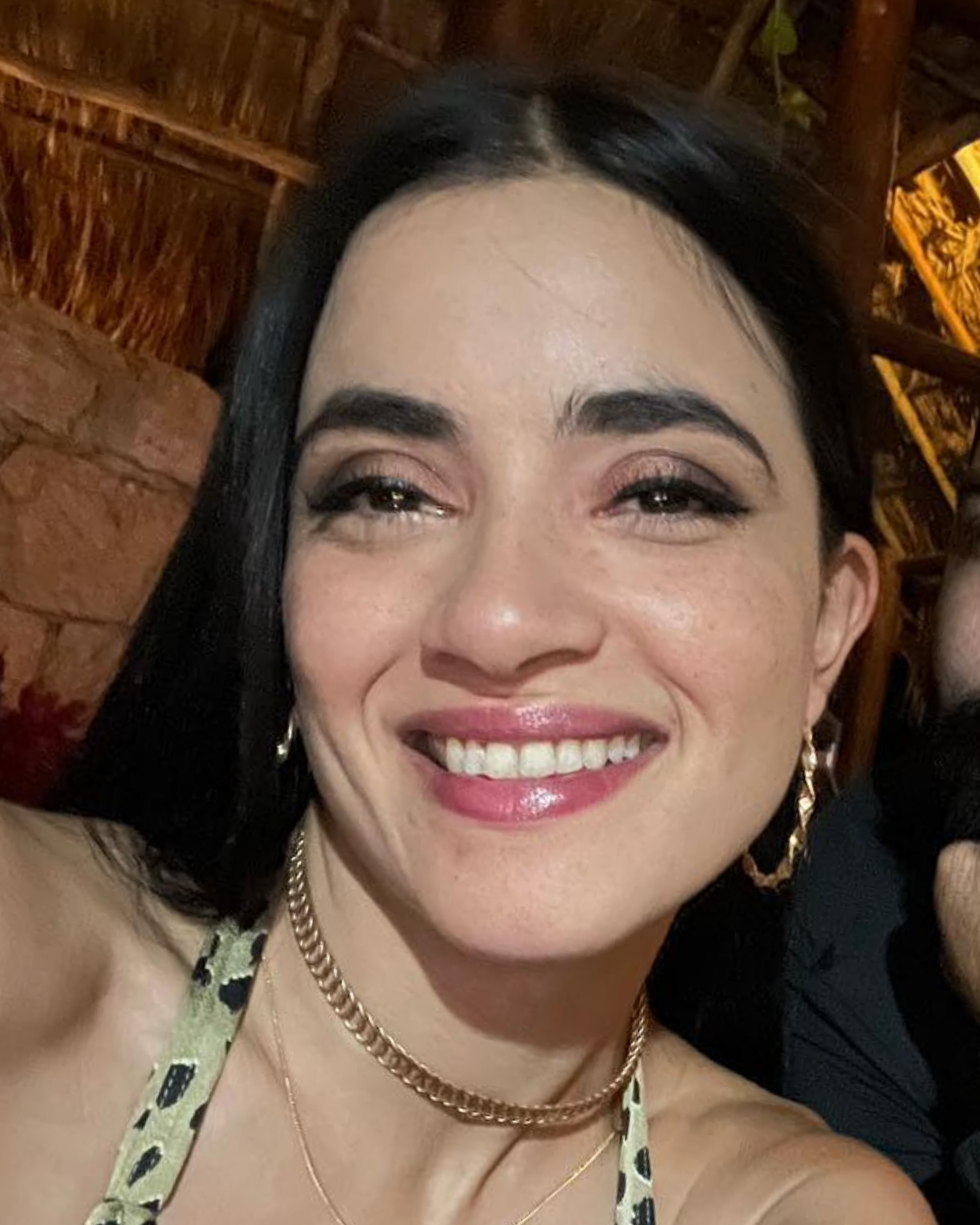
Paulina Gaitán, Best Actress in a Miniseries or TV series winner.

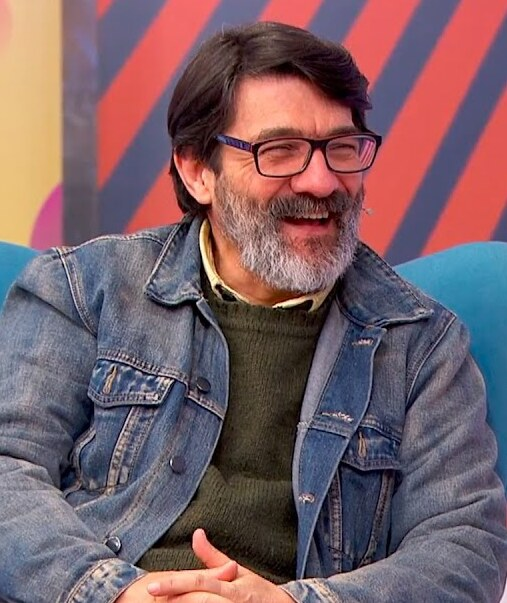
César Troncoso, Best Supporting Actor in a Miniseries or TV series winner.

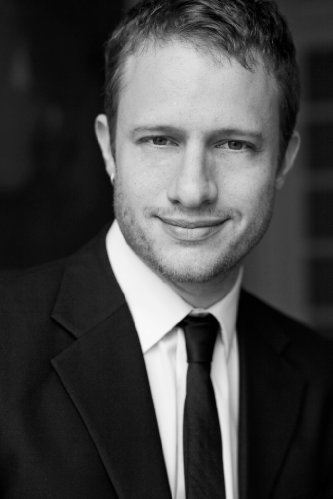
Federico Jusid, Best Original Score for a Miniseries or TV series winner.

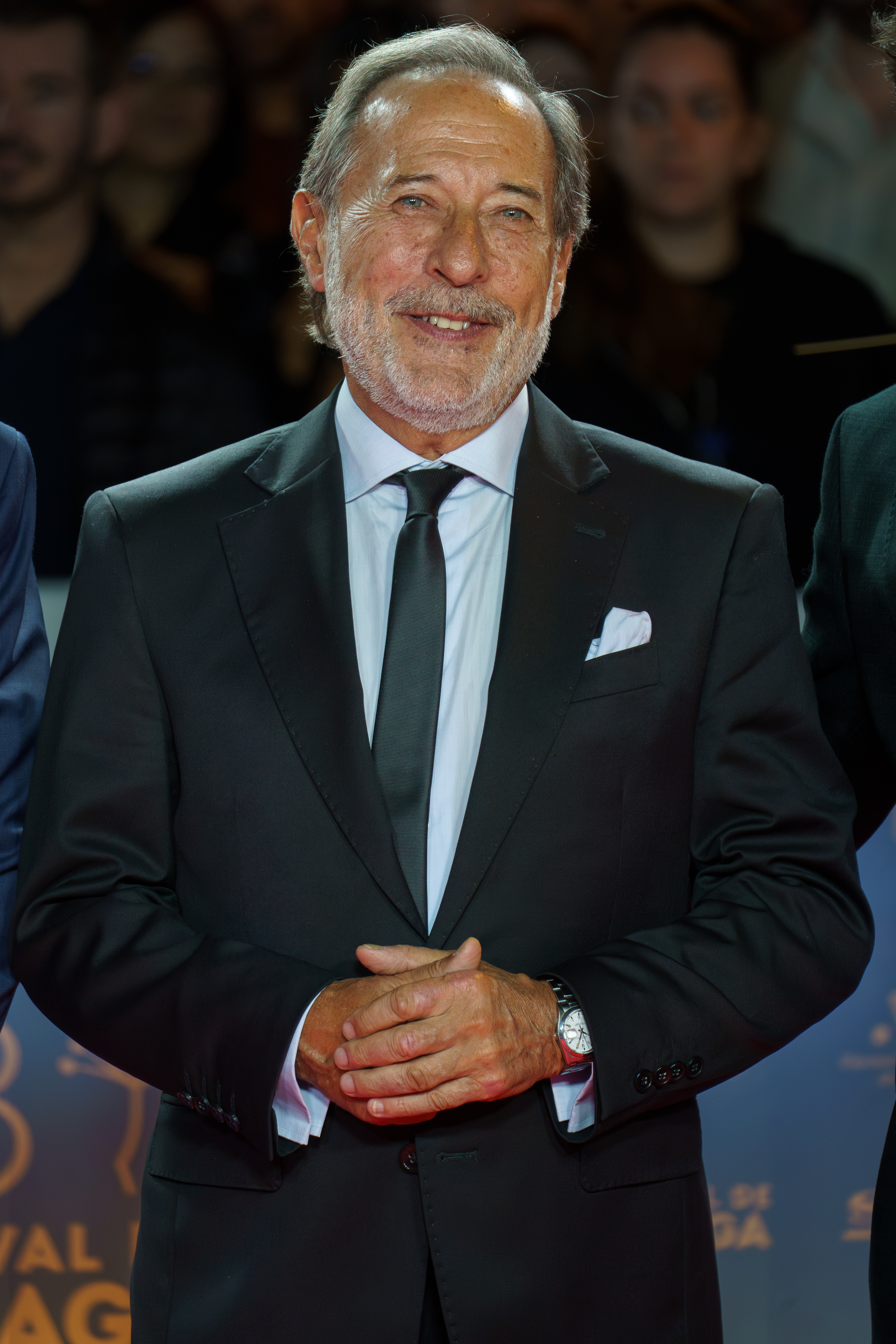
Guillermo Francella, Honorary Platino Award recipient.

The winners and nominees of the series categories are listed as follows:

Best Ibero-American Miniseries or TV series: The Eternaut (Netflix); The Anatomy of a Moment (Movistar Plus+); Chespirito: Not Really on Purpose (HBO Max); The Dead Girls (Netflix)	Best Long-Form Series: Scars of Beauty (HBO Max); La Promesa (La 1); Sueños de Libertad (Antena 3); Velvet: El nuevo imperio (Telemundo)
Best Actor in a Miniseries or TV series: Ricardo Darín – The Eternaut as Juan Salvo (Netflix); Álvaro Morte – The Anatomy of a Moment as Adolfo Suárez (Movistar Plus+); Javier Cámara – Jakarta as Joserra (Movistar Plus+); Leonardo Sbaraglia – Menem as Carlos Saúl Menem (Prime Video)	Best Actress in a Miniseries or TV series: Paulina Gaitán – The Dead Girls as Serafina Baladro (Netflix); Candela Peña – Rage as Nat (HBO Max); Carla Quílez – Jakarta as Mar (Movistar Plus+); Griselda Siciliani – Envious as Victoria Mori (Netflix)
Best Supporting Actor in a Miniseries or TV series: César Troncoso – The Eternaut as Alfredo "Tano" Favalli (Netflix); David Lorente – The Anatomy of a Moment as Antonio Tejero (Movistar Plus+); Eduard Fernández – The Anatomy of a Moment as Santiago Carrillo (Movistar Plus+); Juan Lecanda – Chespirito: Not Really on Purpose as Marcos Barragán (HBO Max)	Best Supporting Actress in a Miniseries or TV series: Andrea Pietra – The Eternaut as Ana (Netflix); Leticia Huijara – The Dead Girls as Eulalia Baladro (Netflix); Lorena Vega – Envious as Fernanda (Netflix); Yalitza Aparicio – Cometierra as Emma (Prime Video)
Best Series Creator: The Eternaut – Bruno Stagnaro (Netflix); Menem – Mariano Varela, Ariel Winograd (Prime Video); The Anatomy of a Moment – Rafael Cobos, José Manuel Lorenzo, Fran Araújo, Alberto Rodríguez (Movistar Plus+); Estado de fuga 1986 – Rodrigo Guerrero (Netflix)	Best Original Score for a Miniseries or TV series: The Eternaut – Federico Jusid (Netflix); Ângela Diniz: Assassinada e Condenada – Antônio Pinto, Gabriel Ferreira (HBO Max); The Anatomy of a Moment – Julio de la Rosa (Movistar Plus+); Estado de fuga 1986 – Manuel J. Gordillo (Netflix)
Best Editing for a Miniseries or TV series: The Eternaut – Alejandro Brodershon, Alejandro Parysow (Netflix); Menem – Andrés Quaranta (Prime Video); The Anatomy of a Moment – José M. G. Moyano (Movistar Plus+); Juan Gabriel: Debo, Puedo y Quiero – Valeria Valenzuela, María José Cuevas (Netflix)	Best Art Direction for a Miniseries or TV series: The Anatomy of a Moment – Pepe Domínguez del Olmo (Movistar Plus+); The Eternaut – María Battaglia, Julián Romera (Netflix); Menem – Natalia Mendiburu (Prime Video); The Dead Girls – Salvador Parra (Netflix)
Best Cinematography for a Miniseries or TV series: The Anatomy of a Moment – Álex Catalán (Movistar Plus+); The Dead Girls – Alberto Anaya Adalid (Netflix); Estado de fuga 1986 – Diego Jiménez (Netflix); The Eternaut – Gastón Girod (Netflix)	Best Sound for a Miniseries or TV series: The Anatomy of a Moment – Daniel de Zayas (Movistar Plus+); Mentiras, la serie – Alejandro de Icaza (Prime Video); Estado de fuga 1986 – Andrés Silva Díaz, Alejandro Uribe-Holguín (Netflix); The Eternaut – Martín Grignaschi (Netflix)
Best Costume Design for a Miniseries or TV series: The Anatomy of a Moment – Fernando García (Movistar Plus+); Nadie Nos Vio Partir – Annaí Ramos (Netflix); Estado de fuga 1986 – Julián Grijalba (Netflix); The Eternaut – Patricia Conta (Netflix); Menem – Pilar González (Prime Video)	Best Make-up and Hairstyling for a Miniseries or TV series: Menem – Marcos Cáceres, Dolores Giménez (Prime Video); Mentiras, la serie – Alejandra Velarde (Prime Video); The Eternaut – Dino Balanzino, Ángela Garacija (Netflix); The Anatomy of a Moment – Yolanda Piña, Nacho Díaz (Movistar Plus+)
Best Special Effects for a Miniseries or TV series: The Eternaut – Ezequiel Rossi, Pablo Accame, Ignacio Pol (Netflix); Cometierra – Daniel de la Madrid, Alejandro Valente (Prime Video); Menem – Guille Lawlor, Bruno Fauceglia, Ezequiel Hasi (Prime Video); Cada Minuto Cuenta – Ricardo Arvizu (Prime Video)

=== Platino Honorary Award ===
- Guillermo Francella

== Extental links ==
- Official website
