= Kill the Jockey =

2024 film directed by Luis Ortega

- Theatrical release poster
- Spanish: El jockey
- Directed by: Luis Ortega
- Written by: Fabian Casas; Luis Ortega; Rodolfo Palacios
- Produced by: Charlie Cohen; Benjamín Doménech; Santiago Gallelli; Axel Kuschevatzky; Paz Lázaro; Isaac Lee; Nando Vila; Luis Ortega; Esteban Perroud; Matias Roveda; Cindy Teperman
- Starring: Nahuel Pérez Biscayart; Úrsula Corberó; Daniel Giménez Cacho; Mariana di Girolamo
- Cinematography: Timo Salminen
- Production companies: Rei Pictures; El Despacho; Infinity Hill; Exile Content
- Distributed by: Star Distribution (Argentina); Caramel Films (Spain); Music Box Films (United States)
- Release dates: 29 August 2024 (Venice); 26 September 2024 (Argentina); 30 May 2025 (Spain); 2 July 2025 (United States)
- Running time: 96 minutes
- Countries: Argentina; Mexico; Spain; Denmark; United States
- Language: Spanish
- Box office: $176,451

Kill the Jockey (Spanish: El jockey) is a 2024 surrealist neo-noir psychological drama film co-written and directed by Luis Ortega, starring Nahuel Pérez Biscayart alongside Úrsula Corberó and Daniel Giménez Cacho.

The film premiered at the 81st Venice International Film Festival, where it competed for the Golden Lion and the Queer Lion. The film was selected as the Argentine entry for Best International Feature Film at the 97th Academy Awards, but was not nominated.

== Premise ==
Jockeys Abril and Remo race for a powerful mobster named Sirena until Remo accidentally kills a valuable race horse. Abril must find Remo in Buenos Aires and bring him to safety before Sirena tracks him down.

== Cast ==
- Nahuel Pérez Biscayart as Remo Manfredini/Dolores "Lola", a jockey who faces substance use issues.
- Úrsula Corberó as Abril, Remo's pregnant girlfriend and a fellow jockey debating whether to continue her career or start a family
- Daniel Giménez Cacho as Rubén Sirena, a mobster
- Daniel Fanego as Fanego, Sirena's henchman
- Osmar Núñez as Luis, Sirena's henchman
- Roberto Carnaghi as Oscar, Sirena's henchman
- Luis Ziembrowski as Enrique
- Jorge Prado as the mysterious man
- Adriana Aguirre as the mystic woman
- Mariana Di Girólamo as Ana, a fellow jockey who later starts an affair with Abril
- Roly Serrano as the jail warden

== Release ==
In July 2024, Kill the Jockey was announced as a main competition entry at that year's Venice International Film Festival. The film was also selected for screenings in the Centrepiece section of the 2024 Toronto International Film Festival and in the Horizontes Latinos section of the 72nd San Sebastián International Film Festival.

The film has been selected for the MAMI Mumbai Film Festival 2024 under the World Cinema section.

Latin American distribution rights for Kill the Jockey were acquired by Star Distribution in August 2024. The film debuted theatrically in Argentina on 26 September 2024, followed by a streaming release in Latin America on Disney+. It is scheduled to be released theatrically in Spain by Caramel Films on 30 May 2025. The film is scheduled to be released in the United States on 2 July 2025.

== Reception ==
On the review aggregator website Rotten Tomatoes, 88% of 33 critics' reviews are positive, with an average rating of 7.5/10. Metacritic, which uses a weighted average, assigned the film a score of 67 out of 100, based on 6 critics, indicating "generally favorable" reviews.

Leslie Felperin of The Hollywood Reporter said the film, described as an "equestrian-themed psychological thriller-comedy-whatsit," was "heavy on style, light on character".

Wendy Ide of ScreenDaily declared the film "a playful, shape-shifting, questioning journey that refuses to be neatly pinned down".

Guillermo Courau of La Nación rated the film 4 out of 5 stars ('very good'), writing that it is a film in which Ortega "manages to merge concerns and aesthetics in an almost perfect way".

The Argentine Academy of Cinematography Arts and Sciences chose the film as Argentina's submission to the Academy Award for Best International Film and to the Goya Award for Best Ibero-American Film.

=== Accolades ===
Award	Ceremony date	Category	Recipient(s)	Result	Ref.
Venice International Film Festival	7 September 2024	Golden Lion	Kill the Jockey	Nominated	
Venice International Film Festival	7 September 2024	Premio CinemaSarà	Kill the Jockey	Special Mention	
Venice International Film Festival	7 September 2024	Edipo Re Award	Kill the Jockey	Won	
San Sebastián International Film Festival	28 September 2024	Horizontes Latinos Award	Kill the Jockey	Won	
Forqué Awards	14 December 2024	Best Latin-American Film	Kill the Jockey	Nominated	
Goya Awards	8 February 2025	Best Ibero-American Film	Kill the Jockey	Nominated	
Platino Awards	27 April 2025	Best Ibero-American Film	Kill the Jockey	Nominated	
Platino Awards	27 April 2025	Best Director	Luis Ortega	Nominated	
Platino Awards	27 April 2025	Best Screenplay	Luis Ortega, Rodolfo Palacios, Fabián Casas	Nominated	
Platino Awards	27 April 2025	Best Actor	Nahuel Pérez Biscayart	Nominated	
Platino Awards	27 April 2025	Best Actress	Úrsula Corberó	Nominated	
Platino Awards	27 April 2025	Best Supporting Actor	Daniel Fanego	Won	
Platino Awards	27 April 2025	Best Film Editing	Rosario Suárez, Yibrán Asaud	Nominated	
Platino Awards	27 April 2025	Best Art Direction	Germán Naglieri, Julia Freid	Nominated	
Platino Awards	27 April 2025	Best Sound	Guido Berenblum	Nominated	
Golden Trailer Awards	29 May 2025	Best Foreign Poster	Infinity Hill / Fable	Nominated	
Golden Trailer Awards	29 May 2025	Most Original Poster	Infinity Hill / Fable	Nominated	
Sur Awards	23 July 2025	Best Film	Kill the Jockey	Won	
Sur Awards	23 July 2025	Best Director	Luis Ortega	Won	
Sur Awards	23 July 2025	Best Actor	Nahuel Pérez Biscayart	Won	
Sur Awards	23 July 2025	Best Supporting Actor	Daniel Fanego	Won	
Sur Awards	23 July 2025	Best Art Direction	Julia Freid, Germán Naglieri	Won	
Sur Awards	23 July 2025	Best Costume Design	Beatriz Di Benedetto	Won	
Sur Awards	23 July 2025	Best Cinematography	Timo Salminen	Won	
Sur Awards	23 July 2025	Best Original Screenplay	Fabián Casas, Luis Ortega, Rodolfo Palacios	Won	
Sur Awards	23 July 2025	Best Makeup	Ángela Garacija	Won	
Sur Awards	23 July 2025	Best Original Score	Sune Rose Wagner	Won	
Sur Awards	23 July 2025	Best Sound	Guido Berenblum, Claus Lynge, Javier Umpiérrez	Won	
Ariel Awards	20 September 2025	Best Ibero-American Film	Kill the Jockey	Won	

== See also ==
- List of Argentine films of 2024
- List of Spanish films of 2025
- List of submissions to the 97th Academy Awards for Best International Feature Film
- List of Argentine submissions for the Academy Award for Best International Feature Film
- List of films about horse racing
- List of films about horses
