= Platino Award for Best Director =

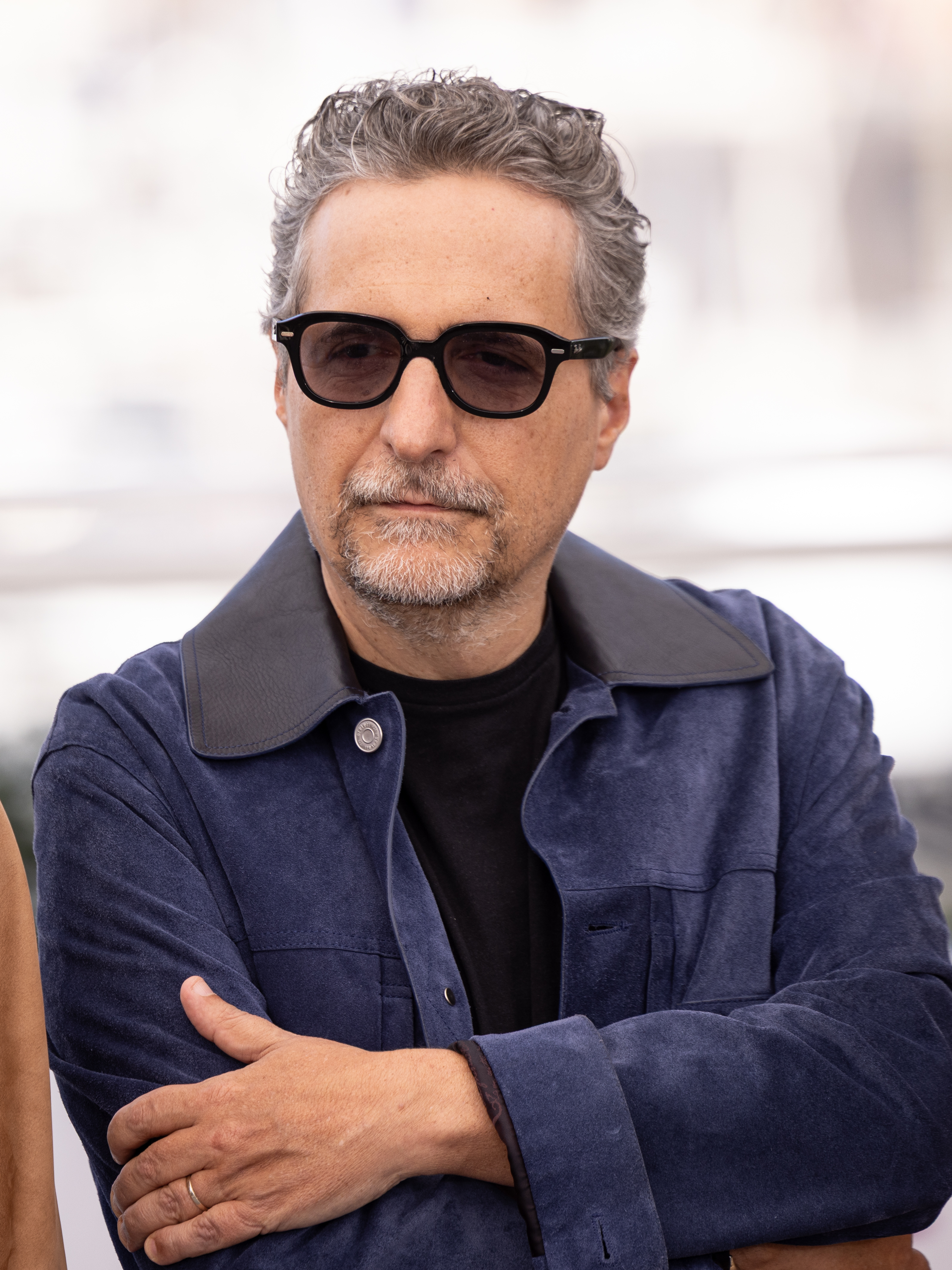
- 2026 recipient: Kleber Mendonça Filho
- Country: Ibero-America
- Presented by: Entidad de Gestión de Derechos de los Productores Audiovisuales (EGEDA); Federación Iberoamericana de Productores Cinematográficos y Audiovisuales (FIPCA)
- Currently held by: Kleber Mendonça Filho for The Secret Agent (2026)
- Website: premiosplatino.com

The Platino Award for Best Director (Spanish: Premio Platino al mejor director / Premio Platino a la mejor dirección) is one of the Platino Awards, Ibero-America's film awards presented annually by the Entidad de Gestión de Derechos de los Productores Audiovisuales (EGEDA) and the Federación Iberoamericana de Productores Cinematográficos y Audiovisuales (FIPCA).

== History ==
It was first presented at the 1st Platino Awards, where Mexican director Amat Escalante was the first recipient of the award for the film Heli. Escalante also won Best Director at the 56th Ariel Awards, Mexico's most important film awards. Starting with a set of four nominees in 2014, the category presented five nominees from 2015 to 2018, later returning to four in 2019.

Spanish director Pedro Almodóvar is the only director who has won the award more than once with two wins, in 2017 for Julieta and in 2020 for Pain and Glory.

Almodovar is also the most nominated director with four nominations, followed by Pablo Larraín with three, and Sebastián Lelio, Álvaro Brechner, Ciro Guerra, J. A. Bayona, Isabel Coixet and Icíar Bollaín, all with two nominations each.

As of 2024, six of the eleven winners for the award have been Spanish directors, being the country with the most winner and nominees in the category.

In the list below the winner of the award for each year is shown first, followed by the other nominees.

== Awards and nominations ==
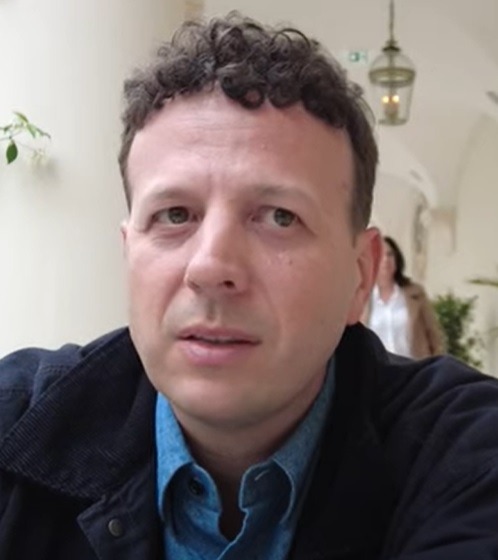
Amat Escalante, the first recipient of the award.

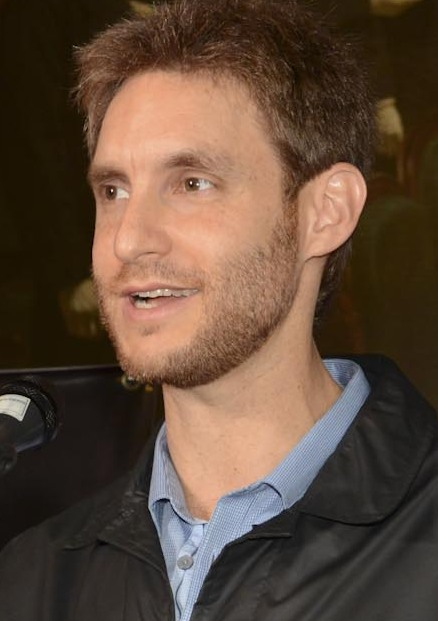
2015 winner, Damián Szifron.

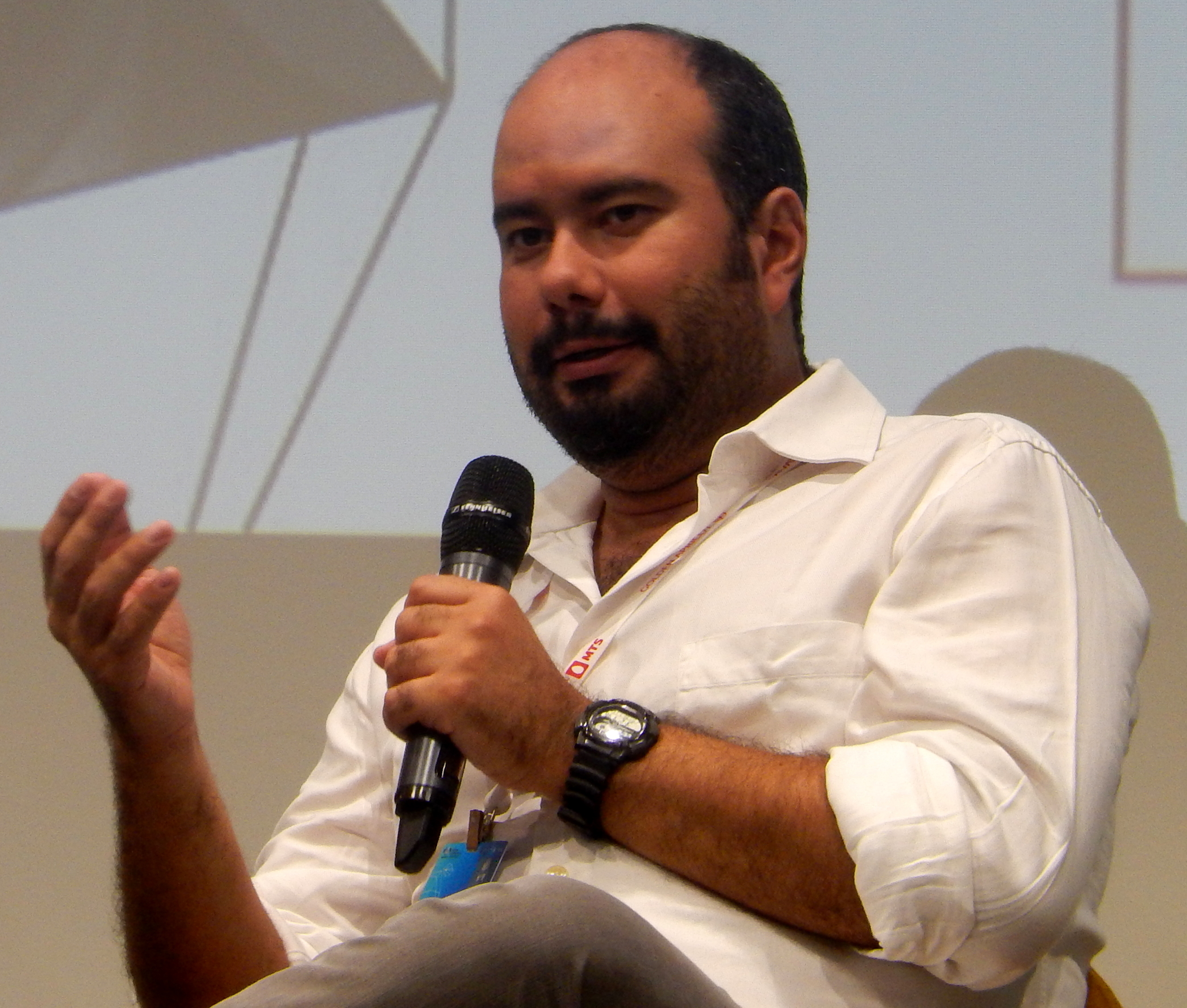
2016 winner, Ciro Guerra.

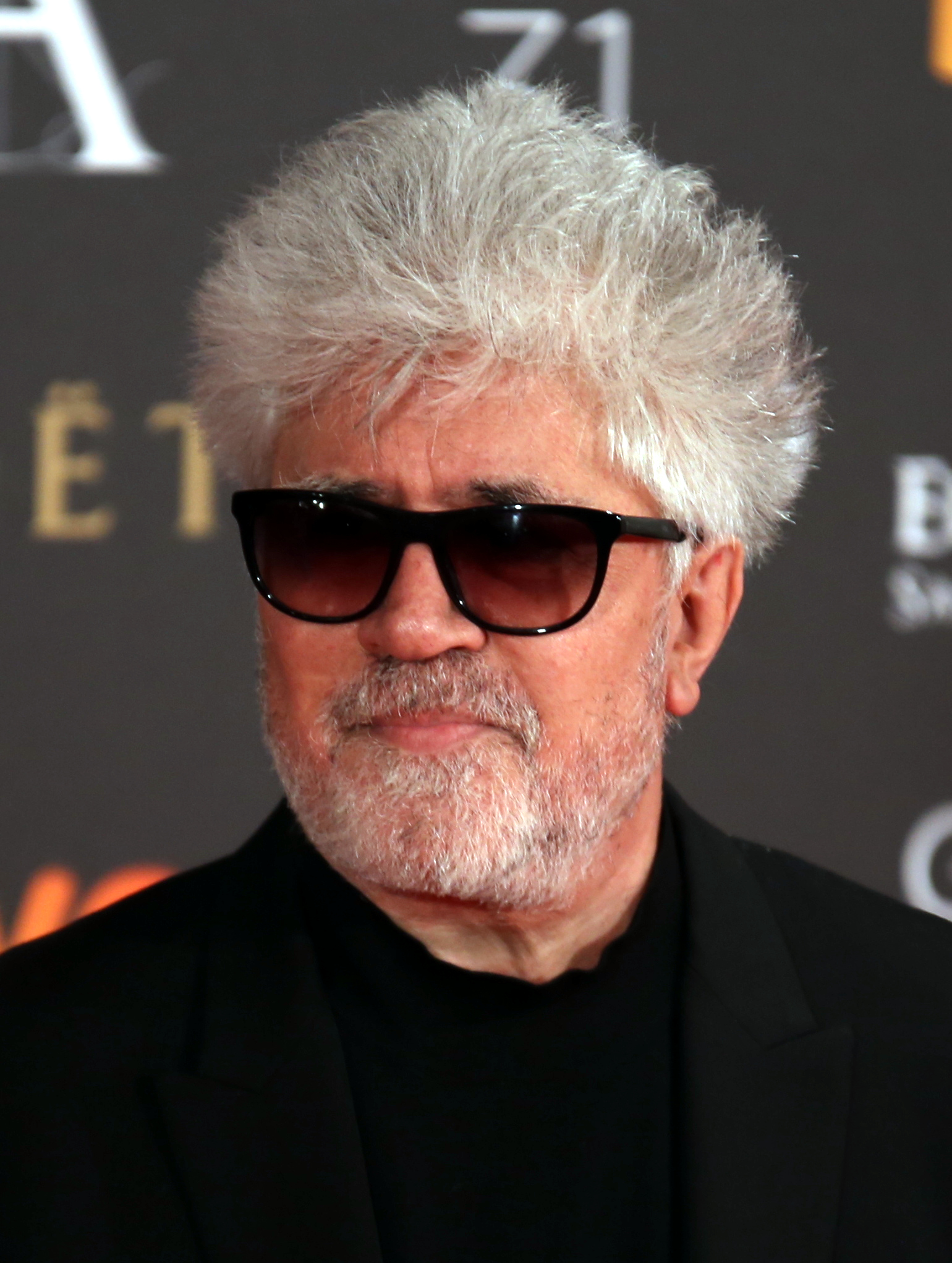
Two-time winner, Pedro Almodóvar.

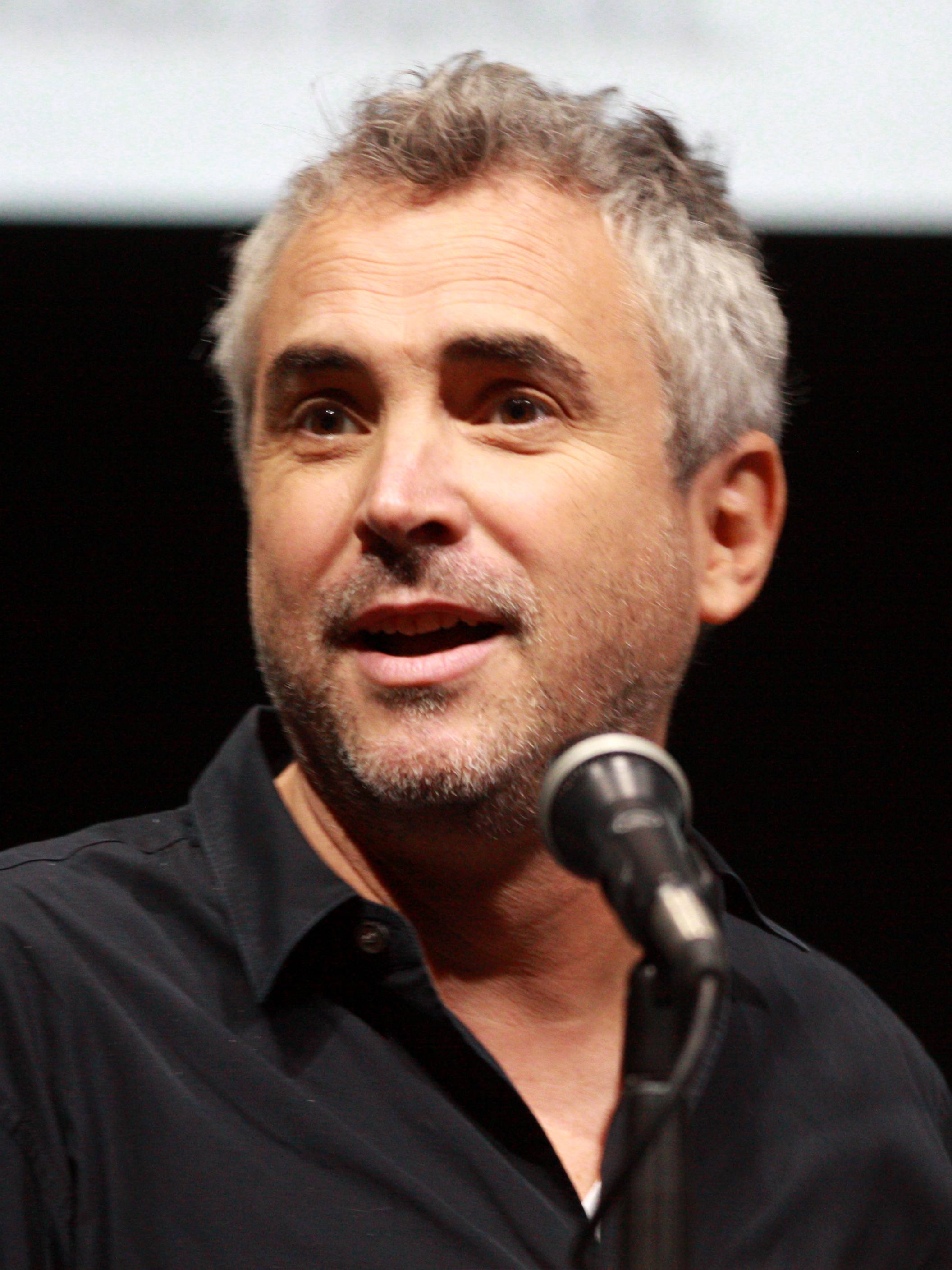
2019 winner, Alfonso Cuarón.

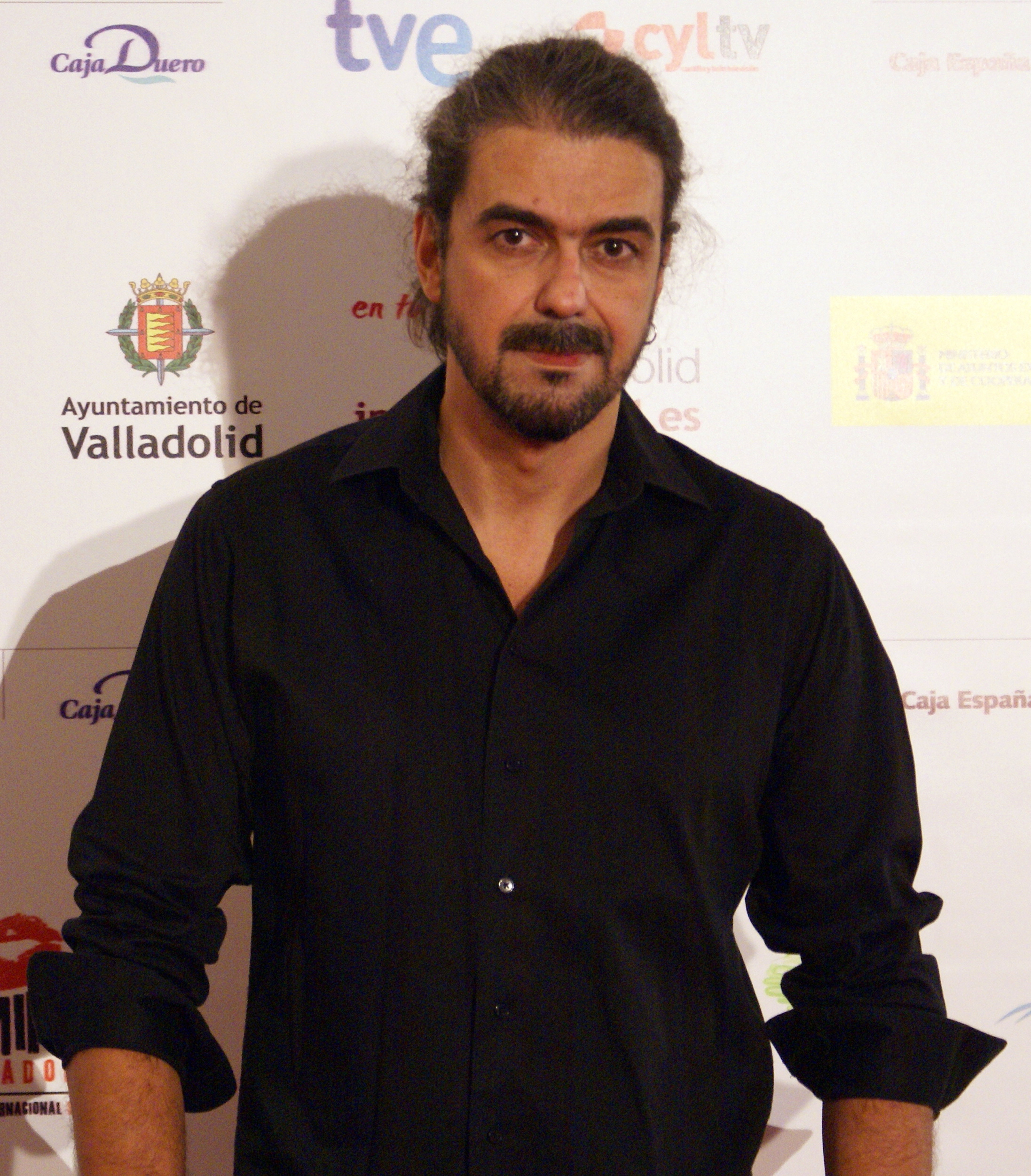
2022 winner, Fernando León de Aranoa.

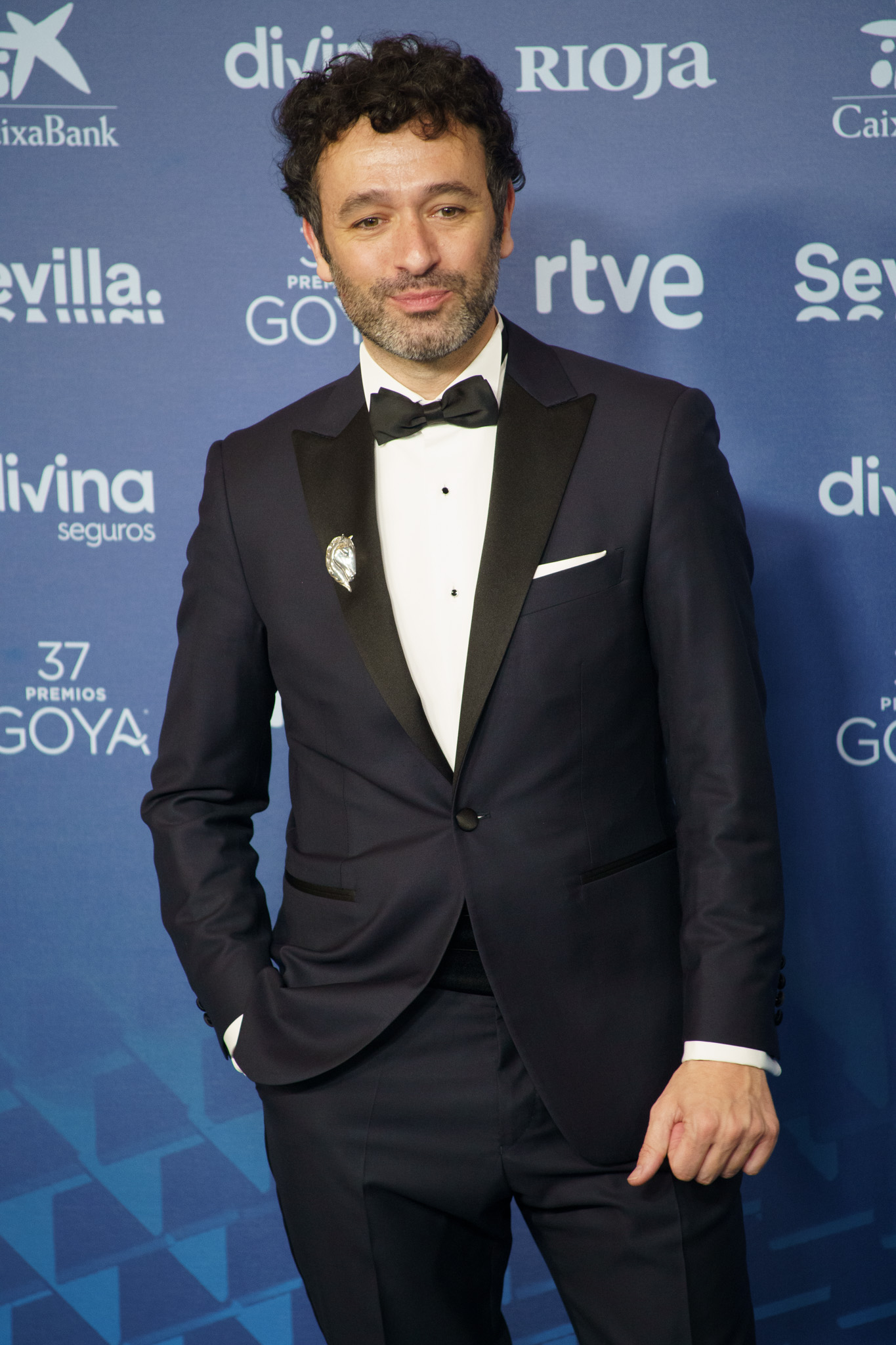
2023 winner, Rodrigo Sorogoyen.

=== 2010s ===
Year	Director	English title	Original title
2014 (1st)	(Mexico) Amat Escalante	Heli	
2014 (1st)	(Spain) David Trueba	Living Is Easy with Eyes Closed	Vivir es fácil con los ojos cerrados
2014 (1st)	(Argentina) Lucía Puenzo	The German Doctor	Wakolda
2014 (1st)	(Chile) Sebastián Lelio	Gloria	
2015 (2nd)	(Argentina) Damián Szifron	Wild Tales	Relatos salvajes
2015 (2nd)	(Cuba) Ernesto Daranas	Behavior	Conducta
2015 (2nd)	(Spain) Alberto Rodríguez Librero	Marshland	La isla mínima
2015 (2nd)	(Uruguay) Álvaro Brechner	Mr. Kaplan	
2015 (2nd)	(Venezuela) Mariana Rondón	Bad Hair	Pelo malo
2016 (3rd)	(Colombia) Ciro Guerra	Embrace of the Serpent	El abrazo de la serpiente
2016 (3rd)	(Argentina) Pablo Trapero	The Clan	El Clan
2016 (3rd)	(Chile) Pablo Larraín	The Club	El Club
2016 (3rd)	(Spain) Cesc Gay	Truman	
2016 (3rd)	(Mexico) Alonso Ruizpalacios	Güeros	
2017 (4th)	(Spain) Pedro Almodóvar	Julieta	
2017 (4th)	(Spain) J. A. Bayona	A Monster Calls	Un monstruo viene a verme
2017 (4th)	(Brazil) Kleber Mendonça Filho	Aquarius	
2017 (4th)	(Argentina) Gastón Duprat & Mariano Cohn	The Distinguished Citizen	El ciudadano ilustre
2017 (4th)	(Chile) Pablo Larraín	Neruda	
2018 (5th)	(Chile) Sebastián Lelio	A Fantastic Woman	Una mujer fantástica
2018 (5th)	(Spain) Álex de la Iglesia	Perfect Strangers	Perfectos desconocidos
2018 (5th)	(Cuba) Fernando Pérez	Last Days in Havana	Últimos días en La Habana
2018 (5th)	(Spain) Isabel Coixet	The Bookshop	La librería
2018 (5th)	(Argentina) Lucrecia Martel	Zama	
2019 (6th)
2019 (6th)	(Mexico) Alfonso Cuarón	Roma	
2019 (6th)	(Spain) Javier Fesser	Champions	Campeones
2019 (6th)	(Uruguay) Álvaro Brechner	A Twelve-Year Night	La noche de 12 años
2019 (6th)	(Colombia) Ciro Guerra & Cristina Gallego	Birds of Passage	Pájaros de verano

=== 2020s ===
Year	Director	English title	Original title
2020 (7th)	(Spain) Pedro Almodóvar	Pain and Glory	Dolor y gloria
2020 (7th)	(Spain) Alejandro Amenábar	While at War	Mientras dure la guerra
2020 (7th)	(Spain) Jon Garaño, Aitor Arregi & Jose Mari Goenaga	The Endless Trench	La trinchera infinita
2020 (7th)	(Argentina) Juan José Campanella	The Weasel's Tale	El cuento de la comadreja
2021 (8th)	(Spain) Fernando Trueba	Forgotten We'll Be	El olvido que seremos
2021 (8th)	(Spain) Icíar Bollaín	Rosa's Wedding	La boda de Rosa
2021 (8th)	(Guatemala) Jayro Bustamante	La Llorona	
2021 (8th)	(Mexico) Michel Franco	New Order	New Order
2022 (9th)	(Spain) Fernando León de Aranoa	The Good Boss	El buen patrón
2022 (9th)	(Spain) Icíar Bollaín	Maixabel	
2022 (9th)	(Spain) Pedro Almodóvar	Parallel Mothers	Madres paralelas
2022 (9th)	(El Salvador) Tatiana Huezo	Prayers for the Stolen	Noche de fuego
2023 (10th)	(Spain) Rodrigo Sorogoyen	The Beasts	As bestas
2023 (10th)	(Spain) Carla Simón	Alcarràs	
2023 (10th)	(Argentina) Santiago Mitre	Argentina, 1985	
2023 (10th)	(Mexico) Alejandro González Iñarritu	Bardo, False Chronicle of a Handful of Truths	Bardo, falsa crónica de unas cuantas verdades
2024 (11th)	(Spain) J. A. Bayona	Society of the Snow	La sociedad de la nieve
2024 (11th)	(Spain) Isabel Coixet	Un amor	
2024 (11th)	(Mexico) Lila Avilés	Tótem	
2024 (11th)	(Chile) Pablo Larraín	El conde	
2025 (12th)	(Brazil) Walter Salles	I'm Still Here	Ainda Estou Aqui
2025 (12th)	(Argentina) Luis Ortega	Kill the Jockey	El jockey
2025 (12th)	(Spain) Pedro Almodóvar	The Room Next Door	La habitación de al lado
2025 (12th)	(Spain) Arantxa Echevarría	Undercover	La infiltrada
2026 (13th)	(Brazil) Kleber Mendonça Filho	The Secret Agent	O Agente Secreto
2026 (13th)	(Spain) Alauda Ruiz de Azúa	Sundays	Los domingos
2026 (13th)	(Argentina) Dolores Fonzi	Belén	
2026 (13th)	(Spain) Oliver Laxe	Sirāt	

== See also ==
- Goya Award for Best Director
