= Platino Award for Best Art Direction =

- Awarded for: Best Art Direction
- Country: Ibero-America
- Presented by: Entidad de Gestión de Derechos de los Productores Audiovisuales (EGEDA), Federación Iberoamericana de Productores Cinematográficos y Audiovisuales (FIPCA)
- Currently held by: Thales Junqueira for The Secret Agent (2026)
- Website: premiosplatino.com

The Platino Award for Best Art Direction (Spanish: Premio Platino a la mejor dirección de arte) is one of the Platino Awards, Ibero-America's film awards, presented by the Entidad de Gestión de Derechos de los Productores Audiovisuales (EGEDA) and the Federación Iberoamericana de Productores Cinematográficos y Audiovisuales (FIPCA).

== History ==
The category was first awarded at the second edition of the awards in 2015 with Clara Notari being the first recipient of the award for her work in the Argentine film Wild Tales.

In the list below. the winner of the award for each year is shown first, followed by the other nominees.

== Awards and nominations ==
=== 2010s ===
Year	English title	Original title	Recipient
2015 (2nd)	(Argentina) Wild Tales	Relatos salvajes	Clara Notari
2015 (2nd)	(Spain) Marshland	La isla mínima	Pepe Domínguez
2015 (2nd)	(Cuba) Behavior	Conducta	Erick Glass
2015 (2nd)	(Uruguay) Mr. Kaplan		Gustavo Ramírez
2015 (2nd)	(Venezuela) Bad Hair	Pelo malo	Matías Tikas
2016 (3rd)	(Colombia) Embrace of the Serpent	El abrazo de la serpiente	Angélica Perea
2016 (3rd)	(Guatemala) Ixcanul		Pilar Peredo
2016 (3rd)	(Argentina) The Clan	El Clan	Sebastián Orgambide
2016 (3rd)	(Portugal) Arabian Nights: Volume 2, The Desolate One	As Mil e Uma Noites: Volume 2, O Desolado	Bruno Duarte & Artur Pinheiro
2016 (3rd)	(Spain) The Bride	La novia	Jesús Bosqued Maté & Pilar Quintana
2017 (4th)	(Spain) A Monster Calls	Un monstruo viene a verme	Eugenio Caballero
2017 (4th)	(Argentina) Incident Light	La luz incidente	Ailí Chen
2017 (4th)	The Queen of Spain	La reina de España	Juan Pedro de Gaspar
2017 (4th)	(Portugal) Letters from War	Cartas da Guerra	Nuno Mello
2017 (4th)	(Spain) The Death of Louis XIV	La muerte de Luis XIV	Sebastián Vogler
2018 (5th)	(Argentina) Zama		Renata Pinheiro
2018 (5th)	(Chile) A Fantastic Woman	Una mujer fantástica	Estefanía Larraín
2018 (5th)	(Spain) Giant	Handia	Mikel Serrano
2018 (5th)	(Spain) Summer 1993	Estiu 1993	Mónica Bernuy
2018 (5th)	(Argentina) The Summit	La cordillera	Sebastián Orgambide & Micaela Saeigh
2019 (6th)	(Colombia) Birds of Passage	Pájaros de Verano	Angélica Perea
2019 (6th)	(Mexico) Roma		Eugenio Caballero
2019 (6th)	(Spain) The Man Who Killed Don Quixote	El hombre que mató a Don Quijote	Benjamín Fernández
2019 (6th)	(Brazil) The Great Mystical Circus	O Grande Circo Místico	Artur Pinheiro

=== 2020s ===
Year	English title	Original title	Recipient
2020 (7th)	(Spain) While at War	Mientras dure la guerra	Juan Pedro de Gaspar
2020 (7th)	(Cuba) Insumisas		Alexis Álvarez
2020 (7th)	(Spain) The Endless Trench	La trinchera infinita	Pepe Domínguez
2020 (7th)	(Mexico) The Good Girls	Las niñas bien	Claudio Ramírez Castelli
2021 (8th)	(Colombia) Forgotten We'll Be	El olvido que seremos	Diego López
2021 (8th)	(Spain) Coven	Akelarre	Mikel Serrano
2021 (8th)	(Spain) Schoolgirls	Las niñas	Mónica Bernuy
2021 (8th)	(Guatemala) La Llorona		Sebastián Muñoz
2022 (9th)	(Spain) Parallel Mothers	Madres paralelas	Antxón Gómez
2022 (9th)	(Colombia) Memoria		Angélica Perea
2022 (9th)	(Spain) The Good Boss	El buen patrón	César Macarrón
2022 (9th)	(Mexico) Devil Between the Legs	El diablo entre las piernas	Sandra Flores & Alejandro García
2023 (10th)	Argentina, 1985		Micaela Saiegh
2023 (10th)	(Mexico) Bardo, False Chronicle of a Handful of Truths	Bardo, falsa crónica de unas cuantas verdades	Eugenio Caballero
2023 (10th)	(Chile) 1976		Francisca Correa
2023 (10th)	(Spain) Prison 77	Modelo 77	Pepe Domínguez del Olmo
2024 (11th)	(Chile) El conde		Rodrigo Bazaes
2024 (11th)	(Argentina) Puan		Julieta Dolinsky
2024 (11th)	(Spain) Close Your Eyes	Cerrar los ojos	Curru Garabal
2024 (11th)	(Chile) The Settlers	Los colonos	Sebastián Orgambide
2025 (12th)	(Mexico) Pedro Páramo		Eugenio Caballero, Carlos Y. Jacques
2025 (12th)	(Spain) Undercover	La infiltrada	Eduardo Hidalgo
2025 (12th)	(Argentina) Kill the Jockey	El jockey	Germán Naglieri, Julia Freid
2025 (12th)	(Spain) The Red Virgin	La virgen roja	Javier Alvariño
2026 (13th)	(Brazil) The Secret Agent	O Agente Secreto	Thales Junqueira
2026 (13th)	(Chile) The Mysterious Gaze of the Flamingo	La misteriosa mirada del flamenco	Bernardita Baeza
2026 (13th)	(Spain) The Dinner	La cena	Koldo Vallés
2026 (13th)	(Argentina) Belén		Micaela Saiegh

== See also ==
- Goya Award for Best Art Direction
