= Something Old, Something New, Something Borrowed =

- Theatrical release poster
- Directed by: Hernán Rosselli
- Written by: Hernán Rosselli
- Produced by: Adán Aliaga; Guido Deniro; Mariana Luconi; Miguel Molina; Alejandro Rath; Hernán Rosselli; Juan Álamos
- Starring: Maribel Felpeto; Alejandra Cánepa; Juliana Simoes Risso; Leandro Menéndez; Hugo Felpeto; Javier Abril Rotger; Marcelo Barbosa
- Cinematography: Joaquín Neira
- Edited by: Jimena García Molt; Hernán Rosselli; Federico Rotstein
- Music by: Johann Sebastian Bach
- Production companies: 36 Caballos; Un Resentimiento de Provincia Cine; Proton Cine; Zebra Cine; Arde Cine
- Distributed by: Santa Cine
- Release dates: May 16, 2024 (Cannes); December 5, 2024 (Argentina)
- Running time: 100 minutes
- Countries: Argentina; Spain; Portugal
- Language: Spanish

Something Old, Something New, Something Borrowed (Spanish: Algo viejo, algo nuevo, algo prestado) is a 2024 drama film written, co-produced, co-edited and directed by Hernán Rosselli. The film mixes fiction with real VHS footage recorded in the 1980s and 2000s. The cast is made up of Maribel Felpeto, Alejandra Cánepa, Juliana Simoes Risso, Leandro Menéndez, Hugo Felpeto, Javier Abril Rotger and Marcelo Barbosa.

The film had its world premiere in the Directors' Fortnight section of the 77th Cannes Film Festival on May 16, 2024.

== Synopsis ==
The Felpeto family runs an illegal gambling business in Buenos Aires. However, after the death of Maribel's father, she discovers her father's dark secret, while changes in the police and judicial leadership jeopardize the business.

== Cast ==
- Maribel Felpeto as Maribel Felpeto
- Alejandra Cánepa
- Juliana Simoes Risso
- Leandro Menéndez
- Hugo Felpeto
- Javier Abril Rotger
- Marcelo Barbosa

== Release ==
The film had its world premiere on May 16, 2024, in the Directors' Fortnight section of the 77th Cannes Film Festival, then screened on August 9, 2024, at the 28th Lima Film Festival, in late September 2024 at the 8th Pingyao International Film Festival, on October 28, 2024, at the 62nd Vienna International Film Festival, on November 27, 2024, at the 14th Festival Márgenes, and on November 28, 2024, at the 27th Montreal International Documentary Festival,

The film was released commercially on December 5, 2024, in Argentine theaters.

== Reception ==
=== Critical response ===
On the review aggregator website Rotten Tomatoes, 100% of 11 critics' reviews are positive.

=== Accolades ===
In September 2025, the Argentine Academy of Cinematography Arts and Sciences announced that Something Old, Something New, Something Borrowed was on their shortlist for their submission to the 98th Academy Awards for Best International Feature Film alongside Belén, Homo Argentum, and The Woman in the Line. However, it was not chosen.

Award / Festival	Date of ceremony	Category	Recipient(s)	Result	Ref.
Cannes Film Festival	23 May 2024	Director's Fortnight	Something Old, Something New, Something Borrowed	Nominated	
UNAM International Film Festival	20 June 2024	International Competition - Best Feature	Something Old, Something New, Something Borrowed	Won	
Lima Film Festival	17 August 2024	Best Picture	Something Old, Something New, Something Borrowed	Nominated	
Lima Film Festival	17 August 2024	Best Actress	Maribel Felpeto	Won	
Pingyao International Film Festival	30 September 2024	Roberto Rossellini Awards - Best Film	Something Old, Something New, Something Borrowed	Nominated	
Gijón International Film Festival	23 November 2024	FIPRESCI Award for Best Feature Film	Something Old, Something New, Something Borrowed	Won	
Gijón International Film Festival	23 November 2024	Special Award for Artistic Contribution: Tierres en trance	Something Old, Something New, Something Borrowed	Won	
Festival Márgenes	30 November 2024	Best Film	Something Old, Something New, Something Borrowed	Won	
Viña del Mar International Film Festival	30 November 2024	Latin American Fiction Feature Film Competition - Best Film	Something Old, Something New, Something Borrowed	Nominated	
Montreal International Documentary Festival	1 December 2024	International Feature Competition - Grand Prize	Something Old, Something New, Something Borrowed	Nominated	
Silver Condor Award	20 February 2025	Best Film	Something Old, Something New, Something Borrowed	Nominated	
Silver Condor Award	20 February 2025	Best Director	Hernán Rosselli	Nominated	
Silver Condor Award	20 February 2025	Best Newcomer (Female)	Maribel Felpeto	Nominated	
Silver Condor Award	20 February 2025	Best Editing	Federico Rotstein, Hernán Rosselli & Jimena García Molt	Nominated	
Argentine Academy of Cinematography Arts and Sciences Awards	23 July 2025	Best Film	Something Old, Something New, Something Borrowed	Nominated	
Argentine Academy of Cinematography Arts and Sciences Awards	23 July 2025	Best Director	Hernán Rosselli	Nominated	
Argentine Academy of Cinematography Arts and Sciences Awards	23 July 2025	Best New Actor	Leandro Menéndez	Nominated	
Argentine Academy of Cinematography Arts and Sciences Awards	23 July 2025	Best Original Screenplay	Hernán Rosselli	Nominated	
Argentine Academy of Cinematography Arts and Sciences Awards	23 July 2025	Best Editing	Jimena García Molt, Hernán Rosselli & Federico Rotstein	Won	
