= Diego Lerman =

Argentine film director, writer and producer

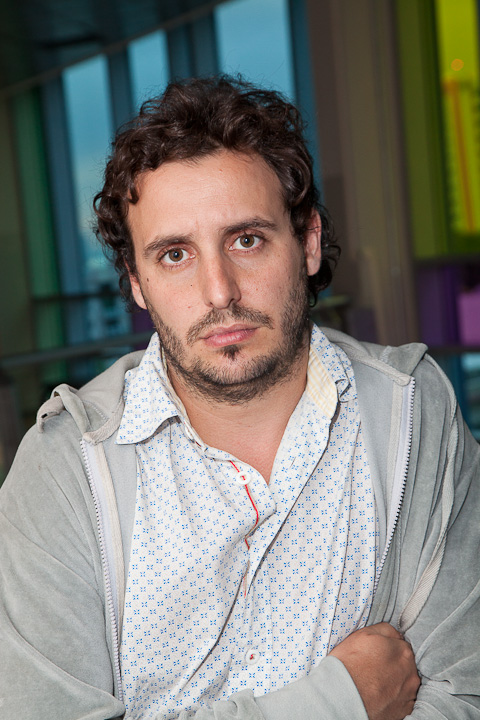
Lerman at the 2011 Miami International Film Festival showing of The Invisible Eye

Diego Lerman (born March 24, 1976, in Buenos Aires, Argentina) is an Argentine film director, producer and screenplay writer. He works mainly in the cinema of Argentina.

== Directing and screenplay filmography ==
- La Prueba (1999)
- Tan de repente (2002) a.k.a. Suddenly (also produced)
- La Guerra de los gimnasios (2005) (also produced)
- Mientras tanto (2006) a.k.a. Meanwhile
- The Invisible Eye (2010)
- A Sort of Family (2017)
- The Substitute (2022)
- The Man Who Loved UFOs (2024)
