= The Man Who Loved UFOs =

- Promotional release poster
- Spanish: El hombre que amaba los platos voladores
- Directed by: Diego Lerman
- Screenplay by: Diego Lerman; Adrián Biniez
- Starring: Leonardo Sbaraglia; Sergio Prina
- Production companies: Campo Cine; Bicho Films
- Distributed by: Netflix
- Release dates: 24 September 2024 (Zinemaldia); 26 September 2024 (Argentina)
- Country: Argentina
- Language: Spanish

The Man Who Loved UFOs (Spanish: El hombre que amaba los platos voladores) is a 2024 Argentine absurdist comedy-drama film directed by Diego Lerman starring Leonardo Sbaraglia.

== Plot ==
In 1986, journalist José de Zer and cameraman Chango travel to La Candelaria (Córdoba) to report about a purported case of UFO sighting in the area, managing to turn the paltry field evidence (some burnt pastures) into a media phenomenon.

== Cast ==
- Leonardo Sbaraglia as José de Zer
- Sergio Prina as Chango
- Osmar Núñez
- Guillermo Pfening
- María Merlino
- Mónica Ayos as Monica
- Norman Briski
- Eva Bianco
- Daniel Aráoz
- Renata Lerman as Marti

== Production ==
The film is a Campo Cine and Bicho Films production.

== Release ==
The film premiered in the official competition lineup of the 72nd San Sebastián International Film Festival on 24 September 2024, vying for the Golden Shell. It was released theatrically in Argentina on 26 September 2024, followed by a 18 October 2024 streaming debut on Netflix.

== Reception ==
Jonathan Romney of ScreenDaily wrote that "everything hinges on Sbaraglia's performance as a likeable if self-serving and faintly sleazy figure" but, from a dramatic standpoint, "the film lacks bite".

== See also ==
- List of Argentine films of 2024
