= A Sort of Family =

2017 film

- Film poster
- Directed by: Diego Lerman
- Written by: Diego Lerman; María Meira
- Produced by: Nicolás Avruj; Diego Lerman
- Starring: Bárbara Lennie
- Cinematography: Wojciech Staroń
- Edited by: Alejandro Brodersohn
- Music by: José Villalobos
- Production companies: El Campo Cine; Bossa Nova Films; Bellota Films; Staron Film; 27 Films Production; Productora MG; Snowglobe Films; Telefe; Red Rental
- Distributed by: United International Pictures (Argentina); Filmarti (Turkey)
- Release dates: 8 September 2017 (TIFF); 14 September 2017 (Argentina)
- Running time: 95 minutes
- Countries: Argentina; Brazil; France; Poland
- Language: Spanish

A Sort of Family (Spanish: Una especie de familia) is a 2017 internationally co-produced drama film directed by Diego Lerman. It was screened in the Contemporary World Cinema section at the 42nd Toronto International Film Festival on 8 September 2017.

== Cast ==
- Bárbara Lennie as Malena
- Daniel Aráoz as Dr. Costas
- Claudio Tolcachir as Mariano
- Yanina Ávila as Marcela
- Paula Cohen as Dra. Pernía
