= Belén (film) =

2025 Argentine film by Dolores Fonzi

- Theatrical release poster
- Directed by: Dolores Fonzi
- Screenplay by: Dolores Fonzi; Laura Paredes; Agustina San Martín; Nicolás Britos
- Based on: Somos Belén by Ana Correa
- Produced by: Hugo Sigman; Leticia Cristi; Matías Mosteirin
- Starring: Dolores Fonzi; Camila Pláate; Laura Paredes; Julieta Cardinali; Sergio Prina; Luis Machín; César Troncoso; Lili Juárez; Ruth Pláate
- Cinematography: Javier Juliá
- Edited by: Andrés Pepe Estrada
- Music by: Marilina Bertoldi
- Production companies: K&S Films; Amazon MGM Studios
- Distributed by: Digicine
- Release date: September 18, 2025
- Running time: 108 minutes
- Country: Argentina
- Language: Spanish
- Box office: $7,072

Belén is a 2025 Argentine historical legal drama film directed and starred by Dolores Fonzi from a screenplay she co-wrote with Laura Paredes, Agustina San Martín and Nicolás Britos. It is based on the non-fiction book Somos Belén by Ana Correa, which follows a lawyer's quest for justice when her client is falsely imprisoned for providing an illegal abortion.

The film was selected as the Argentine entry for Best International Feature Film at the 98th Academy Awards, making the December shortlist, but it was not nominated.

== Synopsis ==
Attorney Soledad Deza takes on the case of Julieta, a young woman from Tucumán unjustly sentenced to prison after being accused of providing an illegal abortion. Both women face a corrupt legal system and a society that wants to see them fail. As her case gains notoriety, a women's movement emerges that resonates throughout Argentina.

== Cast ==
- Dolores Fonzi as Soledad Deza
- Camila Pláate as Julieta
- César Troncoso
- Julieta Cardinali
- Luis Machín
- Laura Paredes
- Sergio Prina
- Ruth Pláate
- Lili Juarez

== Production ==
On June 7, 2024, Amazon Prime Video announced that together with K&S Films they began working on the production of a film adaptation of the non-fiction book Somos Belén by Ana Correa.

The script took three months to write, three months to complete, seven weeks of filming, and three more months of editing. It was shot in Tucumán, Argentina.

== Release ==
Distributed by Digicine, Belén premiered on September 18, 2025, in Argentine theaters. For its international premiere, the film will be screened on September 23, 2025 at the 73rd San Sebastián International Film Festival, competing for the Golden Shell. Its festival run also included a selection for the Santa Fe International Film Festival 2025 and a special screening at the 20th Rome Film Festival in October 2025. The film is scheduled to premiere worldwide on Amazon Prime Video months after its Argentine theatrical debut.

The film will compete in the Awards Buzz – Best International Feature Film section of the 37th Palm Springs International Film Festival on 3 January 2026.

== Reception ==
=== Critical reception ===
On review aggregator website Rotten Tomatoes, the film holds an approval rating of 95% based on 40 reviews, with an average rating of 7.2/10. The website's critical consensus states: "Belén is a gripping, fast-paced legal drama that elevates a familiar courtroom narrative into an urgent, deeply human call for justice through its richly human performances and searing emotional honesty". On Metacritic, the film has a weighted average score of 70 out of 100, based on 7 critics, indicating "generally favorable reviews".

=== Accolades ===
In September 2025, the Argentine Academy of Cinematography Arts and Sciences announced that Belén was on their shortlist for their submission to the 98th Academy Awards for Best International Feature Film alongside Homo Argentum, Something Old, Something New, Something Borrowed, and The Woman in the Line. Belén ultimately was the official submission for the category.

Award	Date of ceremony	Category	Recipient(s)	Result	Ref.
San Sebastián International Film Festival	27 September 2025	Golden Shell for Best Film	Belén	Nominated	
San Sebastián International Film Festival	27 September 2025	Silver Shell for Best Supporting Performance	Camila Pláate	Won	
Forqué Awards	13 December 2025	Best Latin American Film	Belén	Won	
Astra Awards	January 9, 2026	Best International Feature	Belén	Nominated	
Critics' Choice Movie Awards	January 4, 2026	Best Foreign Language Film	Belén	Nominated	
Goya Awards	February 28, 2026	Best Ibero-American Film	Belén	Won	
Sur Awards	June 2, 2026	Best Film	Belén	Won	
Sur Awards	June 2, 2026	Best Director	Dolores Fonzi	Nominated	
Sur Awards	June 2, 2026	Best Adapted Screenplay	Dolores Fonzi, Laura Paredes	Won	
Sur Awards	June 2, 2026	Best Actress	Dolores Fonzi	Nominated	
Sur Awards	June 2, 2026	Best Supporting Actress	Camila Pláate	Won	
Sur Awards	June 2, 2026	Best Supporting Actress	Julieta Cardinali	Nominated	
Sur Awards	June 2, 2026	Best Supporting Actress	Laura Paredes	Nominated	
Sur Awards	June 2, 2026	Best Supporting Actor	Luis Machín	Nominated	
Sur Awards	June 2, 2026	Best New Actress	Camila Pláate	Won	
Sur Awards	June 2, 2026	Best Cinematography	Javier Juliá	Nominated	
Sur Awards	June 2, 2026	Best Editing	Andrés Pepe Estrada	Won	
Sur Awards	June 2, 2026	Best Costume Design	Lucía Gasconi, Greta Ure	Nominated	
Sur Awards	June 2, 2026	Best Art Direction	Micaela Saiegh	Nominated	
Sur Awards	June 2, 2026	Best Original Score	Marilina Bertoldi	Nominated	
Sur Awards	June 2, 2026	Best Makeup and Characterization	Dino Balanzino, Ángela Garacija	Nominated	
Sur Awards	June 2, 2026	Best Sound	Leandro De Loredo	Nominated	
Grande Otelo Awards	August 4, 2026	Best Ibero-American Film	Belén	Won	
Ariel Awards	October 3, 2026	Best Ibero-American Film	Belén	Nominated	
Macondo Awards	October 25, 2026	Best Ibero-American Film – FIACINE	Belén	Nominated	

== See also ==
- List of Argentine films of 2025
- List of submissions to the 98th Academy Awards for Best International Feature Film
- List of Argentine submissions for the Academy Award for Best International Feature Film
