= Homo Argentum =

- Theatrical release poster
- Directed by: Gastón Duprat; Mariano Cohn
- Written by: Andrés Duprat; Gastón Duprat; Mariano Cohn; Horacio Convertini
- Produced by: Cabe Bossi; Pablo Bossi; Pol Bossi; Martín Iraola; Maximiliano Lasansky
- Starring: Guillermo Francella
- Cinematography: Leo Resende Ferreira
- Edited by: David Gallart
- Music by: Federico Mercuri; Matías Mercuri
- Production companies: Star Distribution; Pampa Films; Gloriamundi Producciones; Dea Film; Blue Film
- Distributed by: Walt Disney Studios Motion Pictures (Argentina/Brazil); A Contracorriente Films (Spain)
- Release date: August 14, 2025
- Running time: 110 minutes
- Country: Argentina
- Languages: Spanish; Italian
- Budget: $5.5 million

Homo Argentum (sold under the international title of Homo Sapiens?) is a 2025 Argentine anthology satirical comedy film co-written and directed by Gastón Duprat and Mariano Cohn. The film is made up of 16 stories starring Guillermo Francella, which explores the dilemmas and contradictions of contemporary Argentine society. The rest of the cast is made up of Eva De Dominici, Clara Kovacic, Miguel Granados, Gastón Soffritti, Dalma Maradona, Milo J, Vanesa González, Juan Luppi and Guillermo Arengo.

== Plot ==
=== "Aquí no ha pasado nada" ===
At a party with friends, a man (Guillermo Francella) explains the values of an average Argentinian and then goes outside to smoke a cigarette with his beer in hand. However, he accidentally hits the bottle with his hand, causing it to fall into the street. It explodes, attracting the attention of a woman who is then run over and a delivery man is thrown from his motorcycle. The man realizes his mistake and decides to pretend nothing happened, returning to the party to dance with his friends. In the distance, police and ambulance sirens can be heard.

=== "Una noche de suerte" ===
A neighborhood watchman (Guillermo Francella) finishes his night shift and heads home. On the way, he runs into a woman named Paloma on the street who's had a fight with her billionaire boyfriend. He takes her to lunch at a Mostaza, where she flirts with him and complains about her current boyfriend. The watchman takes Paloma to his friend's house. Paloma and her friend begin having sex in front of the man, whom they nickname "Panter." The girls seduce Panter by moaning, and the three end up having a threesome.

The next morning, "Panter" takes Paloma to her boyfriend's house, where the couple reconciles. "Panter" returns to security for his night shift, reminiscing about the previous night's events and smiling.

=== "Piso 54" ===
Billionaire Felipe Keller (Guillermo Francella) is riding in an elevator to dinner when a young woman, Ana, fakes an accident and threatens to falsely accuse him of rape if he doesn't transfer $50,000 to her before he reaches the 54th floor. He accepts on the 52nd floor, but Ana ends up asking for 100,000, much to the millionaire's dismay.

Keller doesn't transfer the remaining money, so Ana keeps her promise and shouts out Felipe's attempted rape to her. In the end, it is revealed that it was all a vision, due to the man's fear of the young woman in the elevator, and he chooses to take the stairs instead.

=== "Bienvenidos a Buenos Aires" ===
A money exchanger invites a Brazilian tourist couple to his business, where he exchanges their Brazilian reals for Argentine pesos. After asking who they consider the best: Diego Maradona, Lionel Messi, or Pelé, the exchanger begins offering strange gifts such as a discount on a tango class and leather jackets. The couple walks away while the exchanger makes an unknown phone call (possibly a thief) to give him details of the couple's physical appearance and the amount of money they are carrying.

=== "El niño eterno" ===
After finding their 39-year-old son Ariel having sex with a girl in their home, his parents decide to "friendly" suggest that he move out on his own. The next morning, when they tell him, the man tries to resist, but eventually agrees. The parents and son say goodbye on moving day. A month later, the father (Guillermo Francella) stays up in the living room all night thinking about how much he misses his son, with the mother insulting him for the latter.

=== "Un hombre decidido" ===
Neighbor Aníbal (Guillermo Francella) mounts a small resistance against the crime with the help of his neighbors, which he promotes through the news. While having lunch with his wife, Gladys, he tells her that if he isn't there to kill the thieves with his revolver if they ever break in, he should give them the money hidden in a duck-shaped ornament. That same night, two young men break into the couple's house, prompting Aníbal to get up with his gun ready to fire. However, the man is unable to pull the trigger, and they lock Gladys in the bathroom. The woman successfully follows her husband's previous instructions, and the thieves make off with the duck, among other things.

Furious, Aníbal runs out into the street, threatening to shoot, swearing that if they come back in, this time he'll kill them. He goes to get Gladys out of the bathroom, and he tearfully comforts her by lying that he killed the robbers.

=== "La fiesta de todos" ===
In the 2022 FIFA World Cup Final in Qatar, a reporter (Guillermo Francella) tearfully recounts, holding a rosary, the final penalty of the match taken by Argentine footballer Gonzalo Montiel. When Montiel scores, the reporter and his teammates celebrate with tears of joy and jumping for Argentina's victory after 36 years, but the man chokes on an unknown object and collapses at the table, unnoticed by everyone.

=== "El auto de mis sueños" ===
An elderly man (Guillermo Francella) finally manages to buy the truck he's worked so hard to build. On his way home, he's rear-ended, ruining the car's paint. When he gets out to check the driver's insurance, he discovers he's a former schoolmate, and they chat on the street about life and more, stopping all traffic.

=== "Experiencia enriquecedora" ===
A billionaire (Guillermo Francella) discovers a homeless young man named Axel in a restaurant, paying for his meal. The millionaire then takes Axel shopping around the city, treating him to a variety of luxuries. When he goes to drop him off at his workplace in the slum, Axel jokes that he's going to rob him, much to the man's horror. As he leaves, the millionaire tells a coworker about his experience, describing it as beautiful and something he'll never forget.

=== "Cadena Nacional" ===
Argentina's public channels are interrupted by the National Network for the first address to the people by the newly elected president (Guillermo Francella). He panics and, after several seconds of silence, asks to be removed from the broadcast. The National Network thanks the viewers.

=== "La novia de papá" ===
Antonio (Guillermo Francella) invites his children Anna, Lucas, and Mateo to barbecue to reveal that he has a new girlfriend after the death of their mother. Much to the concern of his children, Antonio's girlfriend turns out to be the former maid Eliana, who is relatively younger than their father. The worried children decide to assign the inheritance to the three of them, afraid that their father might give the money to Eliana. When they go to tell Antonio, he reacts angrily and uncomfortably upon realizing his children's decision, and lies to them and causes them to fight over the inheritance. When the children leave, Eliana asks Antonio if he has already told them about her pregnancy.

=== "Las ventajas de ser pobre" ===
A slum priest (Guillermo Francella) feeds the rest of his poor companions. Before allowing them to eat their food, the priest stops them to thank God for the food, and then stops them once more to list the positive things that are happening to them. A man asks the priest to please let them eat and then tell them the advantages of being poor, to which the repentant priest agrees.

=== "Ezeiza" ===
A couple takes their young daughter to Ministro Pistarini International Airport as she leaves to seek opportunities in Madrid, Spain. The family says a tearful goodbye at the airport, and the parents sadly watch the young woman's departure. In the car, the father (Guillermo Francella) tries to cheer the mother up by promising her a barbecue, arguing that it's something they don't have in Spain. However, they both burst into tears.

=== "Un juguete carísimo" ===
A grandfather (Guillermo Francella) returns from the United States to bring his grandson a limited-edition robot doll that the grandson requested. Upon leaving school, the grandson asks if they can bring his classmate Santi home. On the way, Santi keeps claiming to have the same doll as the grandson, much to the grandfather's dismay. Upon arriving at Santi's house, the grandfather asks the boy to bring them his doll so they can see if he really has it. While they wait, the grandfather tells the grandson that jealous people can lie to make the other person feel bad. To both of their surprise, Santi arrives with the doll in his hands. The grandfather, furious, drives off with the grandson in the car.

=== "Un film necesario" ===
Director Iván Rodríguez (Guillermo Francella) is directing the film "Al rescate de los Awaris" (lit. 'Rescuing the Awaris') about a nearly extinct Argentine tribe. On the last day of filming (which took place in a jungle), the director becomes stressed when a fly won't stay on the face of one of his child protagonists. He also mistreats his assistants and the Awaris who are filming the scene. He also expresses disgust with the place where they are working, the Awaris' home. Finally, they get the perfect shot.

At an awards ceremony, the film wins Best Film, and Ivan hypocritically gives a speech about the importance of the Awari tribe, wearing his traditional makeup while he speaks and shouting at the end that "they are all Awari."

=== "Troppo dolce" ===
In Italy, an Argentine man (Guillermo Francella) tries to find his distant relatives, the Muscarellis. He eventually finds the house and tells them about his family origins, as he is the grandson of one of the family's founders. When he reveals that he owns a construction company in Argentina, the Muscarellis begin asking him for money to pay for a new wheelchair for one of the family members. One of the family members, Giulia, takes the Argentine man to the bathroom to propose having sex or oral sex with him in exchange for helping her escape from the family. The Argentine man, frightened and discovered by the family, decides to escape, with the rest of the family throwing rocks at him from behind. Later, the Muscarellis search through the contents they stole from the Argentine man, including his passport, ID, cards and cash, and a box of Havanna alfajores, tasting them and declaring them "Troppo dolce" (too sweet).

== Cast ==
The actors participating in this film are:

- Guillermo Francella
- Eva De Dominici as Ana
- Clara Kovacic as Paloma
- Miguel Granados as Ariel
- Gastón Soffritti as Lucas
- Dalma Maradona as Eliana
- Milo J as Axel
- Vanesa González as Jimena
- Juan Luppi
- Guillermo Arengo
- Leixandre Gómez Davi as Alan
- Graciela Stéfani as Nancy
- Giulia Brancato as Giulia
- Jorge Barril as Arbolito
- Bruno Rondini as Thief
- Tony Sperandeo

== Production ==
=== Idealization ===
The idea for the film was born from Francella's admiration for the Italian neorealist, such as An Average Little Man and I nuovi mostri, both from 1977, and especially I mostri (1963), which he felt represented the "Italian gene" very well.

=== Writing ===
For two years, the directors, along with Andrés Duprat and Horacio Convertini, wrote a total of 40 stories that would make up the film, but ended up choosing 16.

=== Filming ===
Principal photography lasted nine weeks, beginning in late October 2024 and concluding in December of the same year. The film was shot on location in Buenos Aires, Argentina, and Sicily, Italy.

== Marketing ==
=== Trailer ===
On June 19, 2025, the trailer was released, causing controversy among the audience due to a scene from the short "Piso 54" where Eva De Dominici's character falsely threatens Francella's character with being a rapist. The scene went viral on social media, causing outrage because it seemed to normalize the crime and make it seem like a fun moment, while others compared it to Thelma Fardín's rape accusation against actor Juan Darthés. In an interview with LAM, De Dominici stated that people misinterpreted the scene inviting them to see the film. She also condemned those who compared her character to the Fardin case.

=== Guillermo Francella coments ===
During a media tour prior to the release of Homo Argentum, Guillermo Francella spoke on the streaming channel Olga about his displeasure with films that turn their backs on the public (referring to non-commercial feature features that don't connect with viewers), saying that no one will see those films. His comments sparked criticism from audiences and industry professionals, such as Pablo Echarri, Moria Casán, and Juan Minujín, which intensified after the commercial release.

== Release ==
The film premiered simultaneously on August 14, 2025, in Argentine, Uruguayan, and Chilean theaters, then on September 4, 2025, in Paraguayan theaters, on September 25, 2025, in Peruvian theaters, on October 16, 2025, in Ecuadorian theaters, and on November 20, 2025, in Brazilian theaters. It was also screened in the non-competitive section 'Grand public' of the 20th Rome Film Festival in October 2025 before its OTC release.

It was released on January 16, 2026, on Disney+ via Hulu. A Contracorriente Films acquired distribution rights for the territory of Spain, scheduling a December 25, 2025 theatrical release.

== Reception ==
=== Box-office ===
During its first three days in Argentine theaters, the film attracted over 330,000 viewers, reaching 470,000 viewers in its first weekend, ending its opening week in first place with 689,272, becoming the third-best opening weekend for an Argentine film, surpassing Wild Tales (2014). On its eleventh day in theaters, it reached 1,080,000 viewers, ranking first in the box office that week and becoming the second fastest film to reach one million viewers at the Argentine box office that year, behind Lilo & Stitch. For its third week in theaters, it remained in first place, reaching 1,382,398 tickets, making it the highest-grossing Argentine film of the year and the most successful since the end of the COVID-19 pandemic. For its fourth weekend in theaters, the film drew 100,522 viewers, totaling 1,543,657 viewers, dropping to second place at the box office, being displaced by The Conjuring: Last Rites. For its first month in theaters, the film dropped to third place with 50,645 tickets sold, surpassed by Demon Slayer: Kimetsu no Yaiba – The Movie: Infinity Castle.

=== Critical response ===
The film received mixed reviews. Diego Brodersen from Página 12 pointed out that it is a promising idea, but it fails in its execution because many stories are predictable, weak or lack sufficient grace, not working together. Guillermo Courau from La Nación indicated that the work is uneven, failing to define whether he wants a satire or a serious critical portrait, along with its stereotypes, superficial and short characters that are not very entertaining. Pablo O. Scholz from Clarín highlights Francella's performance and some very successful episodes, but points out that many stories appeal more to melancholy than humor, and that the result can be uneven.

Juan Carlos de Pablo from La Nación had a positive point of view, pointing out that it addresses universal issues in an accurate way and criticizes Argentine issues without only staying in the political divide, and invites you to have a good time and reflect, if you like. Likewise, Jorge Fernández Díaz from the same newspaper added that people should laugh and not bark as if they were watching the news. Juan Manuel Domínguez from Perfil said that the film demonstrates Cohn and Duprat's talent and ambition to create, understand, question and retell stories far from caricature and close to their great playful universe.

In September 2025, the Argentine Academy of Cinematography Arts and Sciences announced that Homo Argentum was on their shortlist for their submission to the 98th Academy Awards for Best International Feature Film alongside Belén, Something Old, Something New, Something Borrowed, and The Woman in the Line. However, it was not chosen.

=== Javier Milei response ===
On August 16, 2025, the 59th president of Argentina Javier Milei published a tweet on Twitter (Now X) praising the commercial success of Homo Argentum, and criticizing people who are upset by the success of a film that received no state funding, calling its critics total failures, supported by his followers and businessman Marcos Galperin. However, days later it was revealed that the film did receive state funding from BA International Production, granting $150 million Argentine pesos.

== Future ==
In June 2025, during an interview with Clarín, directors Gastón Duprat and Mariano Cohn joked about the possibility of making two sequels with the remaining 24 stories: "We only filmed 16 of them, otherwise it would have lasted six hours. So we have Homo Argentum 2 and Homo Argentum 3!."
