= Argentine Academy of Cinematography Arts and Sciences Awards =

The Argentine Academy of Cinematography Arts and Sciences Awards are given by the Argentine Academy of Cinematography Arts and Sciences (Spanish: Academia de las Artes y Ciencias Cinematográficas de la Argentina) to honor achievement in Argentine cinema by Argentina-based filmmakers.

The awards, known as Premios Sur, are given annually by the Academy, whose members include Argentine actors, directors, producers, and industry film technicians.

There are eighteen awards given and, as of February 2007, 220 members in the association vote on the awards.

To qualify the film must be released from October 1 - September 30 in Argentina.

== Awards ==
- Best Film (Mejor película)
- Best New Film (Mejor ópera prima)
- Best Director (Mejor director)
- Best Actress (Mejor actriz protagónica)
- Best Actor (Mejor actor protagónico)
- Best Supporting Actress (Mejor actriz de reparto)
- Best Supporting Actor (Mejor actor de reparto)
- Best New Actress (Mejor actriz revelación)
- Best New Actor (Mejor actor revelación)
- Best Original Screenplay (Mejor guión original)
- Best Adapted Screenplay (Mejor guión adaptado)
- Best Cinematography (Mejor fotografía)
- Best Editing (Mejor montaje)
- Best Art Direction (Mejor dirección artística)
- Best Costume Design (Mejor diseño de vestuario)
- Best Original Music (Mejor música original)
- Best Sound (Mejor sonido)
- Best Foreign Film (Mejor película extranjera)

== See also ==
- 18th Sur Awards
- 19th Sur Awards
- 20th Sur Awards
