= Most People Die on Sundays =

2024 film

- Spanish: Los domingos mueren más personas
- Directed by: Iair Said
- Written by: Iair Said
- Produced by: Nicolás Avruj
- Starring: Iair Said; Rita Cortese; Antonia Zegers
- Cinematography: Giovanni Cimarosti
- Edited by: Iair Said
- Music by: Franz Ascari
- Production companies: El Campo Cine; Patagonik Film Group; Dispàrte; Nephilim Producciones
- Distributed by: Star Distribution (Argentina); A Contracorriente Films (Spain)
- Release dates: 20 May 2024 (Cannes); 7 November 2024 (Argentina); 18 July 2025 (Spain)
- Running time: 73 minutes
- Countries: Argentina; Italy; Spain
- Language: Spanish
- Box office: $8,325

Most People Die on Sundays (Spanish: Los domingos mueren más personas) is a 2024 comedy-drama film directed by Iair Said. It stars Said, Rita Cortese and Antonia Zegers.

The film is based in part on Said's own experiences after the death of his father. The cast also includes Juliana Gattas as David's sister.

== Plot ==
The plot follows David, a 30-year-old gay man from Argentina who has spent several years attending school in Italy; returning home to attend the funeral of his uncle, he is plunged into an existential crisis when his mother Dora announces that she has also decided to unplug the life support that has been keeping David's comatose father, with whom David had a strained and distant relationship, alive.

== Cast ==
- Iair Said as David
- Rita Cortese as Dora
- Antonia Zegers as Silvia
- Juliana Gattas as Elisa

== Production ==
The film is an Argentine-Italian-Spanish co-production by Campo Cine alongside Patagonik Film Group, Disparte, and Nephilim.

== Release ==
The film premiered on May 17, 2024, in the ACID program at the 2024 Cannes Film Festival, where it was a nominee for the Queer Palm. It also made it to the 'Latin Horizons' slate of the 72nd San Sebastián International Film Festival.

It was released in Argentina on 7 November 2024. A Contracorriente Films scheduled a July 18, 2025 theatrical release date in Spain.

== Critical response ==
Ankit Jhunjhunwala of Screen Anarchy called the film affecting but marred by a slow pace, writing that "there is a lugubriousness in the bones of Most People Die On Sundays, even at 75 minutes. Not enough happens and the film feels like it was padded out from a short designed to be 35-40 minutes. Lethargic filmmaking in debut features is not at all uncommon and usually dissipates in subsequent films. Said’s emotional acuity, though, and unique vantage point make him a valuable new voice in cinema."

Nicholas Bell of Ioncinema wrote that "while the mechanics of Said’s narrative are arguably familiar, it’s an interesting dissection of identities involving a gay, overweight, Jewish Argentinean of a particular age whose experiences growing up in a certain time and place have paralyzed him in a repetitive rhythm of arrested development. Exhibiting questionable behaviors, often which are self-sabotaging and prohibitive to his well being, Said brings this somewhat mournful portrait to a quietly moving grace note suggesting the silver lining of loss is a motivational reminder to the living." On review aggregator website Rotten Tomatoes, the film holds an approval rating of 80% based on 15 reviews, with an average rating of 6.4/10.
