= Argentine Academy of Cinematography Arts and Sciences =

Non-profit civil association

- Academia de las Artes y Ciencias Cinematográficas de la Argentina
- Formation: 2004
- Type: Professional association
- Headquarters: Centro Cultural Gral. San Martín; Sarmiento 1551; Buenos Aires
- Coordinates: 34.605231°S 58.388461°W
- Region served: Argentina
- Official language: Spanish
- President: Juan José Campanella
- Website: www.academiadecine.org.ar

The Argentine Academy of Cinematography Arts and Sciences (Spanish: Academia de las Artes y Ciencias Cinematográficas de la Argentina - AACCA) is an industry association in Argentina founded in 2004. Each year the Academy present the Premios Sur (South Prizes) for categories such as best fiction film, best director, best actor and best photography. The Academy also selects Argentine films to represent the company in the annual awards of other countries, such as the Oscars, where appropriate.

== History ==
The original Argentine Academy of Cinematography Arts and Sciences was founded on 22 November 1941. Over the years, and during the peak of Peronism, the academy became increasingly politicized. The last set of Academy Awards was presented for 1954, shortly before the 1955 coup that ousted the Peronists. The Academy was closed after the coup. The present academy was formed when a group of people in the Argentine film industry decided there was a need to recreate the 1941-55 academy. On 29 June 2004 there was a meeting of 82 people of various branches of film making at which the organization was officially relaunched. As of 2014 there were about 240 members, including artists, technicians and other industry professionals.

== See also ==
- Argentine Academy of Cinematography Arts and Sciences Awards
