= Sur Award for Best Actress =

The Sur Award for Best Actress (Spanish: Premio Sur a la Mejor Actriz Protagónica), is an award given annually by the Argentine Academy of Cinematography Arts and Sciences to the best leading performance by a female actor.

The Argentine annual film awards were suspended in 1955 with the military coup d'état known as the Revolución Libertadora. An analogous initiative took off in 2006, after the present academy similar to the one dating back to 1941 and dissolved in 1955 was founded in 2004.

== Winners and nominees ==
Key	Meaning
‡	Indicates the winning actress.

=== 2000s ===
Year	Actress	English title	Original title	Ref.
2006 (1st)	Graciela Borges ‡	The Hands	Las manos	
2006 (1st)	Adriana Aizemberg	A través de tus ojos		
2006 (1st)	Julieta Díaz	Family Law	Derecho de familia	
2006 (1st)	Cecilia Roth	Sofabed	Sofacama	
2007 (2nd)	Carolina Peleritti ‡	Who Says It's Easy?	¿Quién dice que es fácil?	
2007 (2nd)	Julieta Díaz	The Signal	La señal	
2007 (2nd)	Betiana Blum	Touch the Sky	Tocar el cielo	
2008 (3rd)	Valeria Bertuccelli ‡	A Boyfriend for My Wife	Un novio para mi mujer	
2008 (3rd)	Cecilia Roth	Empty Nest	El nido vacío	
2008 (3rd)	Silvia Pérez	Encarnación		
2008 (3rd)	María Onetto	The Headless Woman	La mujer sin cabeza	
2008 (3rd)	Martina Gusmán	Lion's Den	Leonera	
2009 (4th)	Soledad Villamil ‡	The Secret in Their Eyes	El secreto de sus ojos	
2009 (4th)	Ana Celentano	The Widows of Thursdays	Las viudas de los jueves	
2009 (4th)	Natalia Oreiro	Music on Hold	Música en espera	
2009 (4th)	Gabriela Toscano	The Widows of Thursdays	Las viudas de los jueves	
2009 (4th)	"Emme" Mariela Vitale	The Fish Child	El niño pez	

=== 2000s ===
Year	Actress	English title	Original title	Ref.
2010 (5th)	Erica Rivas ‡	It's Your Fault	Por tu culpa	
2010 (5th)	Graciela Borges	Brother and Sister	Dos hermanos	
2010 (5th)	Martina Gusmán	Carancho		
2010 (5th)	Julieta Zylberberg	The Invisible Eye	La mirada invisible	
2011 (6th)	Moro Anghileri ‡	Aballay		
2011 (6th)	Valeria Bertuccelli	Widows	Viudas	
2011 (6th)	Graciela Borges	Widows	Viudas	
2011 (6th)	Julieta Díaz	Juan & Eva	Juan y Eva	
2012 (7th)	Natalia Oreiro ‡	Clandestine Childhood	Infancia clandestina	
2012 (7th)	Julieta Díaz	2+2	Dos más dos	
2012 (7th)	Dolores Fonzi	In the Open	El campo	
2012 (7th)	Carla Peterson	2+2	Dos más dos	
2013 (8th)	Julieta Díaz ‡	Lion's Heart	Corazón de León	
2013 (8th)	Eugenia Capizzano	Cornelia frente al espejo		
2013 (8th)	Claudia Fontán	The Reconstruction	La reconstrucción	
2013 (8th)	Natalia Oreiro	The German Doctor	Wakolda	
2014 (9th)	Erica Rivas ‡	Wild Tales	Relatos salvajes	
2014 (9th)	Celeste Cid	Aire libre		
2014 (9th)	Rita Cortese	Wild Tales	Relatos salvajes	
2014 (9th)	Mercedes Morán	Betibú		
2015 (10th)	Dolores Fonzi ‡	Paulina	La patota	
2015 (10th)	María Eugenia Suárez	Abzurdah		
2015 (10th)	Pilar Gamboa	The Fire	El incendio	
2015 (10th)	Julieta Zylberberg	My Friend from the Park	Mi amiga del parque	
2016 (11th)	Natalia Oreiro ‡	I'm Gilda	Gilda, no me arrepiento de este amor	
2016 (11th)	Marilú Marini	The Rotten Link	El eslabón podrido	
2016 (11th)	Julieta Zylberberg	The Tenth Man	El rey del Once	
2016 (11th)	Erica Rivas	Incident Light	La luz incidente	
2018 (12th)	Sofía Gala Castiglione ‡	Alanis		
2018 (12th)	Paola Barrientos	The Heavy Hand of the Law	El peso de la ley	
2018 (12th)	Dolores Fonzi	The Summit	La cordillera	
2018 (12th)	Bárbara Lennie	A Sort of Family	Una especie de familia	
2019 (13th)	Mercedes Morán ‡	A Family Submerged	Familia sumergida	
2019 (13th)	Antonella Costa	Dry Martina		
2019 (13th)	Liliana Juárez	The Snatch Thief	El motoarrebatador	
2019 (13th)	Mercedes Funes	Yo soy así, Tita de Buenos Aires		

=== 2020s ===
Year	Actress	Original title	Ref.
2020 (14th)	Graciela Borges ‡	The Weasel's Tale	El cuento de las comadrejas
2020 (14th)	Amanda Minujín	The Good Intentions	Las buenas intenciones
2020 (14th)	Erica Rivas	The Sleepwalkers	Los sonámbulos
2020 (14th)	Mercedes Morán	Florianópolis Dream	Sueño Florianópolis
2021 (15th)	Valeria Lois ‡	The Siamese Bond	Las siamesas
2021 (15th)	Cecilia Roth	The Crimes That Bind	Crímenes de familia
2021 (15th)	Mónica Antonópulos	The Charm	El encanto
2021 (15th)	Rita Cortese	The Siamese Bond	Las siamesas
2022 (16th)	Erica Rivas ‡	The Intruder	El prófugo
2022 (16th)	Jimena Anganuzzi	The Attachment Diaries	El apego
2022 (16th)	Lola Berthet	The Attachment Diaries	El apego
2022 (16th)	Paula Carruega	Sand Eyes	Sand Eyes
2023 (17th)	Pilar Gamboa ‡	30 Nights with My Ex	30 noches con mi ex
2023 (17th)	Sofía Gala Castiglione	Exquisite Corpse	Cadáver exquisito
2023 (17th)	Sofía Gala Castiglione	Natalia, Natalia	
2023 (17th)	Marilú Marini	Cuando la miro	
2024 (18th)	Dolores Fonzi ‡	Blondi	
2024 (18th)	Mercedes Morán	Elena Knows	Elena sabe
2024 (18th)	Laura Paredes	Trenque Lauquen	
2024 (18th)	Julieta Zylberberg	The Rescue: The Weight of the World	El rapto
2025 (19th)	Maite Aguilar ‡	Alemania	
2025 (19th)	Rita Cortese	Most People Die on Sundays	Los domingos mueren más personas
2025 (19th)	Miranda de la Serna	Alemania	
2025 (19th)	Inés Estévez	Miranda de viernes a lunes	
2026 (20th)	Marilú Marini ‡	27 Nights	27 noches
2026 (20th)	Dolores Fonzi	Belén	
2026 (20th)	Mara Bestelli	The Message	El mensaje
2026 (20th)	Natalia Oreiro	The Woman in the Line	La mujer de la fila

== Multiple wins and nominations ==
The following individuals received two or more Best Actress awards:

- 3: Érica Rivas
- 2: Graciela Borges, Natalia Oreiro, Dolores Fonzi

The following individuals received two or more Best Actress nominations:

- 5: Natalia Oreiro, Dolores Fonzi, Érica Rivas, Julieta Díaz
- 4: Mercedes Morán, Graciela Borges, Julieta Zylberberg
- 3: Cecilia Roth, Marilú Marini, Rita Cortese, Sofía Gala Castiglione
- 2: Valeria Bertuccelli, Pilar Gamboa, Martina Gusmán
