= 20th Sur Awards =

Argentine film awards

- Date: 2 June 2026
- Site: Teatro Presidente Alvear, Buenos Aires, Argentina
- Hosted by: Andrea Frigerio; Juan Minujín
- Organized by: Argentine Academy of Cinematography Arts and Sciences

Highlights
- Best Film: Belén
- Best Direction: Cris Tapia Marchiori; Gatillero
- Best Actor: Marcelo Subiotto; The Message
- Best Actress: Marilú Marini; 27 Nights
- Most awards: Belén & Gatillero (5)
- Most nominations: Belén (16)

Television coverage
- Network: TNT, HBO Max

The 20th Sur Awards ceremony, presented by the Argentine Academy of Cinematography Arts and Sciences, took place at the Teatro Presidente Alvear in Buenos Aires on 2 June 2026. The gala was hosted by Andrea Frigerio and Juan Minujín, and it was broadcast on TNT and HBO Max.

== Nominations and winners ==
The winners and nominees are listed as follows:

Best Film: Belén; The Message; Gatillero; The Woman in the Line	Best Debut Film: La noche sin mí; Under the Flags, the Sun; Death of a Comedian; Muña muña
Best Director: Cris Tapia Marchiori — Gatillero; Benjamín Ávila — The Woman in the Line; Dolores Fonzi — Belén; Iván Fund — The Message	Best Documentary Film: Weser; Under the Flags, the Sun; El príncipe de Nanawa; LS83
Best Original Screenplay: Cris Tapia Marchiori, Clara Ambrosoni — Gatillero; Benjamín Ávila, Marcelo Muller — The Woman in the Line; Cecilia Atán, Valeria Pivato — Surfacing; Iván Fund — The Message	Best Adapted Screenplay: Dolores Fonzi, Laura Paredes — Belén; Daniel Hendler, Agustina Liendo, Mariano Llinás, Martín Mauregui — 27 Nights; Fernando Krapp, Herman Szwarcbart — LS83; Laura Huberman, Camila Sosa Villada, Javier Van de Couter — Thesis on a Domestication
Best Actress: Marilú Marini — 27 Nights; Dolores Fonzi — Belén; Mara Bestelli — The Message; Natalia Oreiro — The Woman in the Line	Best Actor: Marcelo Subiotto — The Message; Alberto Ammann — The Woman in the Line; Daniel Hendler — 27 Nights; Sergio Podeley — Gatillero
Best Supporting Actress: Camila Pláate — Belén; Carla Peterson — 27 Nights; Julieta Cardinali — Belén; Laura Paredes — Belén	Best Supporting Actor: Fernán Mirás — Mazel Tov; Juan Minujín — Adult; Luis Campos — The Woman in the Line; Luis Machín — Belén
Best New Actress: Camila Pláate — Belén; Anika Bootz — The Message; Camila Peralta — Nancy; Clara Dziembrowski — The Woman in the Line	Best New Actor: Angelo Mutti Spinetta — Surfacing; Alfonso González Lesca — Adult; Federico Heinrich — The Woman in the Line; Pedro Fontaine — The Reborn
Best Cinematography: Martín Sapia — Gatillero; Gustavo Schiaffino — The Message; Javier Juliá — Belén; Sergio Armstrong — The Woman in the Line	Best Costume Design: Roberta Pesci — 27 Nights; Analía Bernabé, Victoria Nana — The Woman in the Line; Constanza Balduzzi — Homo Argentum; Lucía Gasconi, Greta Ure — Belén
Best Art Direction: Sebastián Orgambide — 27 Nights; Ana Cambre — Gatillero; Micaela Saiegh — Belén; Yamila Fontán — The Woman in the Line	Best Original Score: Sebastián Espósito, Daniel Godfrid — The Woman in the Line; Catriel Nievas — Thesis on a Domestication; Marilina Bertoldi — Belén; Mauro Mourelos — The Message
Best Makeup and Characterization: Mariángeles Capparelli — Gatillero; Dino Balanzino, Ángela Garacija— Belén; Karina Comporino — The Woman in the Line; Oscar Mulet — Homo Argentum	Best Editing: Andrés Pepe Estrada — Belén; Andrea Chignoli — The Woman in the Line; Iván Fund — The Message; Mariana Rodríguez — Thesis on a Domestication
Best Sound: Emiliano Biaiñ, Marcos Zoppi — Gatillero; Federico Ezquerro, Ignacio Seligra — The Woman in the Line; Leandro De Loredo — Belén; Leandro De Loredo, Omar Mustafá — The Message	Best Fiction Series: The Eternaut; Caught; Menem; Viudas negras, p*tas y chorras
Best Ibero-American Film: The Secret Agent (Brazil); The Mysterious Gaze of the Flamingo (Chile); Sundays (Spain); Los imaginarios (Guatemala); We Shall Not Be Moved (Mexico); Banzo (Portugal); Pepe (Dominican Republic); El extraordinario viaje del dragón (Venezuela)

=== Films with multiple nominations and awards ===
Films with multiple nominations
Nominations	Film
16	Belén
15	The Woman in the Line
10	The Message
8	Gatillero
6	27 Nights
3	Thesis on a Domestication
2	Homo Argentum
2	Surfacing
2	Adult
2	Under the Flags, the Sun
2	LS83

Films with multiple awards
Awards	Film
5	Belén
5	Gatillero
3	27 Nights
