= Javier van de Couter =

Argentinian actor and screenwriter

Javier van de Couter (born 6 November 1975 in Carmen de Patagones) is an Argentine film and television screenwriter, actor, producer and director.

== Selected filmography ==
- 1999: Gasoleros (telenovela actor)
- 2014: Aire libre (screenwriter, with Anahí Berneri)
- 2015: Historia de un clan (screenwriter)
- 2017: Alanís (screenwriter, with Anahí Berneri)
- 2026: Moria (director and screenwriter)
