= Moria (TV series) =

Argentinian television series

- Genre: Biographical
- Created by: Javier van de Couter
- Written by: Javier Van de Couter; Martín Vatenberg; Jacques Bonnavent; Donna Tefa Sanguinetti
- Directed by: Javier van de Couter
- Composers: Alejandro Kauderer; Ignacio Gabriel
- Country of origin: Argentina
- Original language: Spanish
- No. of seasons: 1
- No. of episodes: 8

Production
- Executive producers: Moria Casán; Mercedes Reincke; Armando Bó; Carolina Agunin; Chino Fernández
- Producers: Natacha Cervi; Ezequiel Olemberg; Tomás Pérez Silva
- Cinematography: Luciano Badaracco
- Editor: Vanessa Ferrario
- Running time: 28–46 minutes
- Production company: About Entertainment

Original release
- Network: Netflix
- Release: August 14, 2026

Moria is a 2026 Netflix biographical series. The plot tells the story of the beginnings, career, family life, transgressions, scandals and revelations of Argentine entertainer, actress, television personality and former vedette Moria Casán, on the occasion of her 80th birthday. It was produced by About Entertainment, directed by Javier van de Couter.

== Plot ==
This biographical series built around Moria Casán, a singular, towering Argentine show business figure, finds the right tone: a way of translating her iconic presence and outsized personality into fiction without flattening it. Moria more than rises to that challenge. The miniseries starts from a bold conceptual premise: to tell Morias life as if it unfolded inside a kind of “snow globe”—an imagined territory hovering somewhere between reality and fantasy. In it, Moria herself becomes a puppet master, manipulating sets. The aesthetics is camp, kitsch, trash; a blend of sexual intensity and a constant party/celebration/melodrama dynamic. The adopted point of view is clear: not so much a mass-market TV diva, but rather a cult figure embraced by queer and marginal communities.

== Cast ==
- Moria Casán as narrator and herself
  - Sofía Gala Castiglione as young Moria
  - Griselda Siciliani as middle-aged Moria
  - Cecilia Roth as older Moria
- Sebastián Arzeno as Gerardo Sofovich
- Luis Machín as Carlos A. Petit
- Leticia Brédice as Susana Giménez
  - Micaela Riera as young Susana Giménez
- Marco Antonio Caponi as Mario Castiglione
- Joaquín Ferreira as Luis Vadalá
- María Fernanda Callejón as Zeta
- Luciana Ulrich as Nora Cárpena
- Melisa Marzioni as Susana Campos
- Martina Perret as Thelma Biral
- Pilar Viñes as Graciela Dufau
- Marcos Medrano as Guillermo Bredeston
- Giuliano Pianetti as Fito Páez
- Eloy Rossen as Galo Sotto

Several cameo appearances: Lali Espósito, Sofía Gala Castiglione, Helena Tuñón, Dante Della Paolera, Marcelo Polino, Negra Vernaci, Fernando Galmarini, Victoria Xipolitakis, Stefy Xipolitakis, Belén Francese, Claudia Fernández, Gustavo Moro, La Barby, Galo Sotto, Valeria Protto.
