= In the Open =

In the Open may refer to:

- In the Open (1914 film)
- In the Open (2011 film)
