= El garante =

- Also known as: The Guarantor
- Genre: Horror; TV miniseries
- Created by: Sebastián Borensztein
- Developed by: Sebastián Borensztein
- Written by: Sebastián Borensztein; Marcelo Slavich; Walter Slavich
- Directed by: Sebastián Borensztein
- Creative director: Sebastián Borensztein
- Starring: Lito Cruz; Leonardo Sbaraglia; Eleonora Wexler
- Theme music composer: Alejandro Lerner
- Country of origin: Argentina
- Original language: Spanish
- No. of seasons: 1
- No. of episodes: 8

Production
- Production location: Ciudad de Buenos Aires
- Running time: 60 min.

Original release
- Network: Canal 9
- Release: 1997 – 1997

Related
- La condena de Gabriel Doyle

Collateral Man, originally titled El garante (English: The Guarantor), is an Argentine television horror miniseries originally transmitted in 1997 by Canal 9.

Created and directed by Sebastián Borensztein, it stars Lito Cruz and Leonardo Sbaraglia.

== Synopsis ==
The story is about the relationship established between Martin Mondragon, a young psychologist (Sbaraglia) and the man who seeks to collect a debt left by his grandfather a long time ago. The psychologist's grandfather had signed a pact with the devil, but died without delivering his soul. As set out on the contract, Mondragon's grandfather agrees to offer his (then unborn) grandson's soul as the guarantor of the deal. José Sagasti (Lito Cruz), Satan's agent, presents himself to Mondragon as the one in charge of collecting the old debt and informing the guarantor of his fate. Being a psychologist, Mondragon thinks to have run into a psychopath and dismisses his threats. But soon after their first meeting, Sagasti starts playing mind games and making Mondragon's life a living hell.

Through its eight chapters, this mini-series recounts the struggle of Martin to avoid surrendering his soul to Sagasti, the envoy of the devil. Both characters give life to a confrontation that is waged on the earthly plane, and at the same time the one-upmanship also plays on the psychologies of both men.

== Cast ==
- Lito Cruz ... Jose Sagasti
- Leonardo Sbaraglia ... Martin Mondragon
- Eleonora Wexler ... Abril, Martin's girlfriend
- David Masajnik ... Marcelo, a friend of Martin
- Luis Luque ... Eduardo, Martin's psychiatrist friend
- Luis Ziembrowski ... Gonzalez
- Franklin Caicedo ... Lozada
- Jorge Marrale ... Satan

== Awards ==
=== Martín Fierro Awards ===
Martin Fierro 1997:

- TV Miniseries:
  - The Guarantor - Winner
- Dramatic Actor Role:
  - Lito Cruz - Nominated
  - Leonardo Sbaraglia - Winner
- Author and/or Screenwriter:
  - Sebastián Borensztein, Marcelo and Walter Slavich - Winner
- Director:
  - Sebastián Borensztein - Winner
- Integral Production/Best Production:
  - The Guarantor - Nominated
- Soundtrack/Original Soundtrack:
  - The Guarantor, by Alejandro Lerner - Nominated

=== FUNDTV Awards ===
- Fiction:
  - The Guarantor - Winner

=== Emmy nomination ===
The show was also nominated for the Emmy Awards.

== Legacy ==
Collateral Man marked a turning point in television fiction in Argentina, as it was meant to recover the prestige of the horror genre; it was popular with the audiences, and in 1997 the miniseries won several Martin Fierro Awards and was nominated for several international awards. Since then, it has been broadcast via on-air channels and cable several times, always being a success.
