= Dolores Fonzi =

Argentine actress (born 1978)

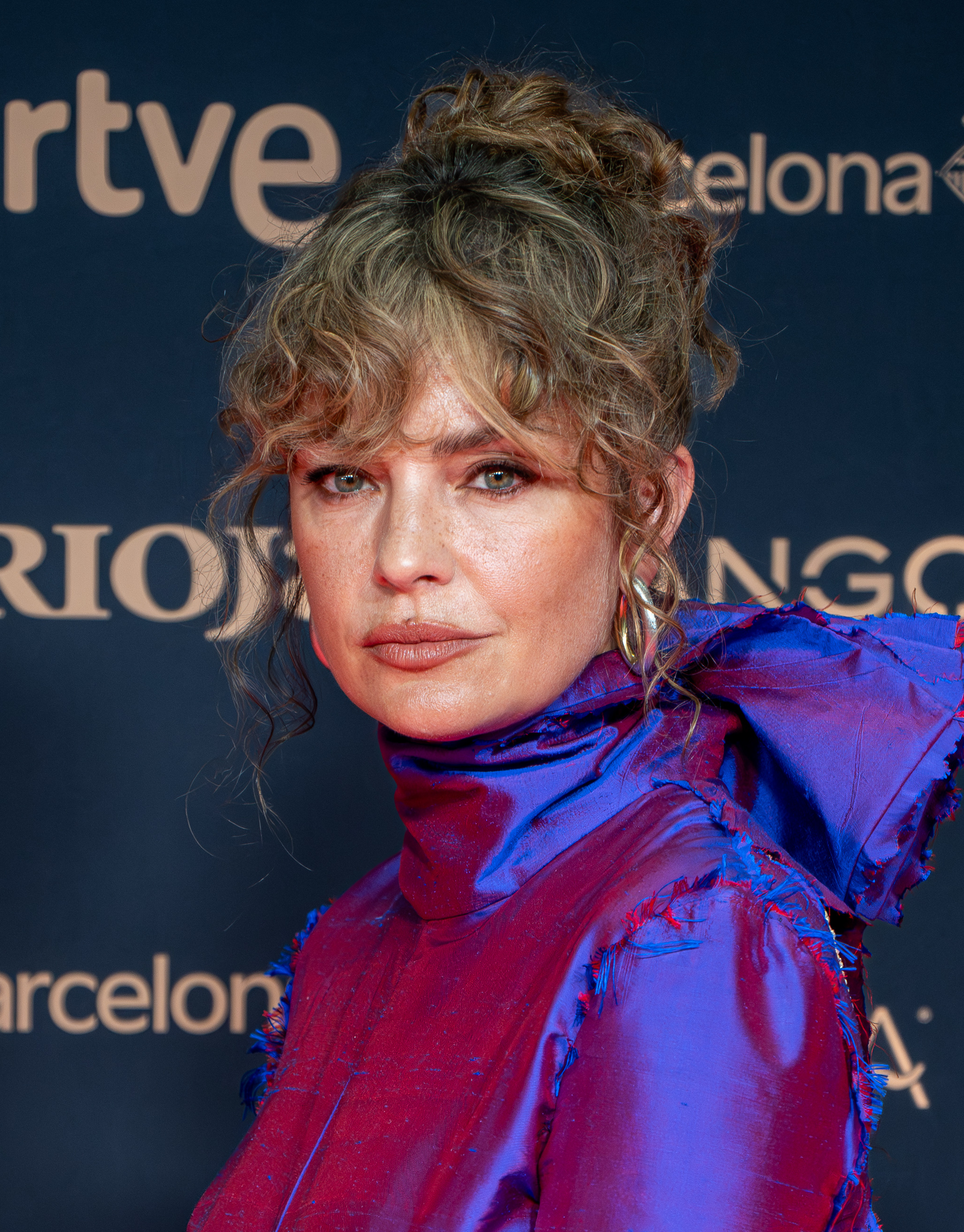
- Fonzi in 2026
- Born: Dolores María Fonzi; 19 July 1978 (age 47); Buenos Aires, Argentina
- Occupation: Actress
- Years active: 1996–present
- Children: 2
- Relatives: Tomás Fonzi (brother)

Dolores María Fonzi (born 19 July 1978) is an Argentine television, theatre and film actress. Several of her films have received critical acclaim such as Burnt Money (2000), Waiting for the Messiah (2000), Bottom of the Sea (2003), The Aura (2005), and Paulina (2015).

In 2023, she marked her directorial debut with the comedy-drama Blondi. Her second film, the legal drama Belén, competed for the Golden Shell at the 73rd San Sebastian International Film Festival.

== Biography ==
Dolores Fonzi was born in Buenos Aires, Argentina. After the separation of her parents, her mother, María del Rosario Cárrega, returned with her children to Adrogué, a city where Dolores and her brothers Tomás and Diego grew up. She studied acting at the school of Carlos Gandolfo. Her brother Tomás Fonzi is also an actor in Argentina.

== Career ==
In 1996, when she was seventeen years old, Dolores Fonzi made her first television appearance in the series La nena. In 1998, Cris Morena chose her to play Clara Vázquez in Verano del '98 with her brother, who played Benjamín Vázquez. Thanks to this successful series and her character as a villain, she gained great popularity and success. At the end of 1999 she left Verano del '98 to be part of the cast of Marcelo Piñeyro's film Burnt Money, thereby landing her film debut with a role as a sex worker. She also appeared in Waiting for the Messiah. In 2001, she had great recognition by integrating the cast of El sodero de mi vida in Canal 13, where she played a girl with a mild intellectual disability. Experimenting with Luis Ortega the tape Caja negra is born, where she acted and participated in the integral creation. She later acted in movies like Private Lives, Bottom of the Sea, The Aura, La mujer rota, Salamandra, El club de la muerte and El campo, for the latter she was nominated for the Silver Condor Awards for Best Actress. In 2003 she starred in the unitary series Disputas and in the adaptation of the play of John Ford, Lástima que sea una puta. The following year she starred with Mariano Martínez the terror unit, Sangre fría by Telefe.

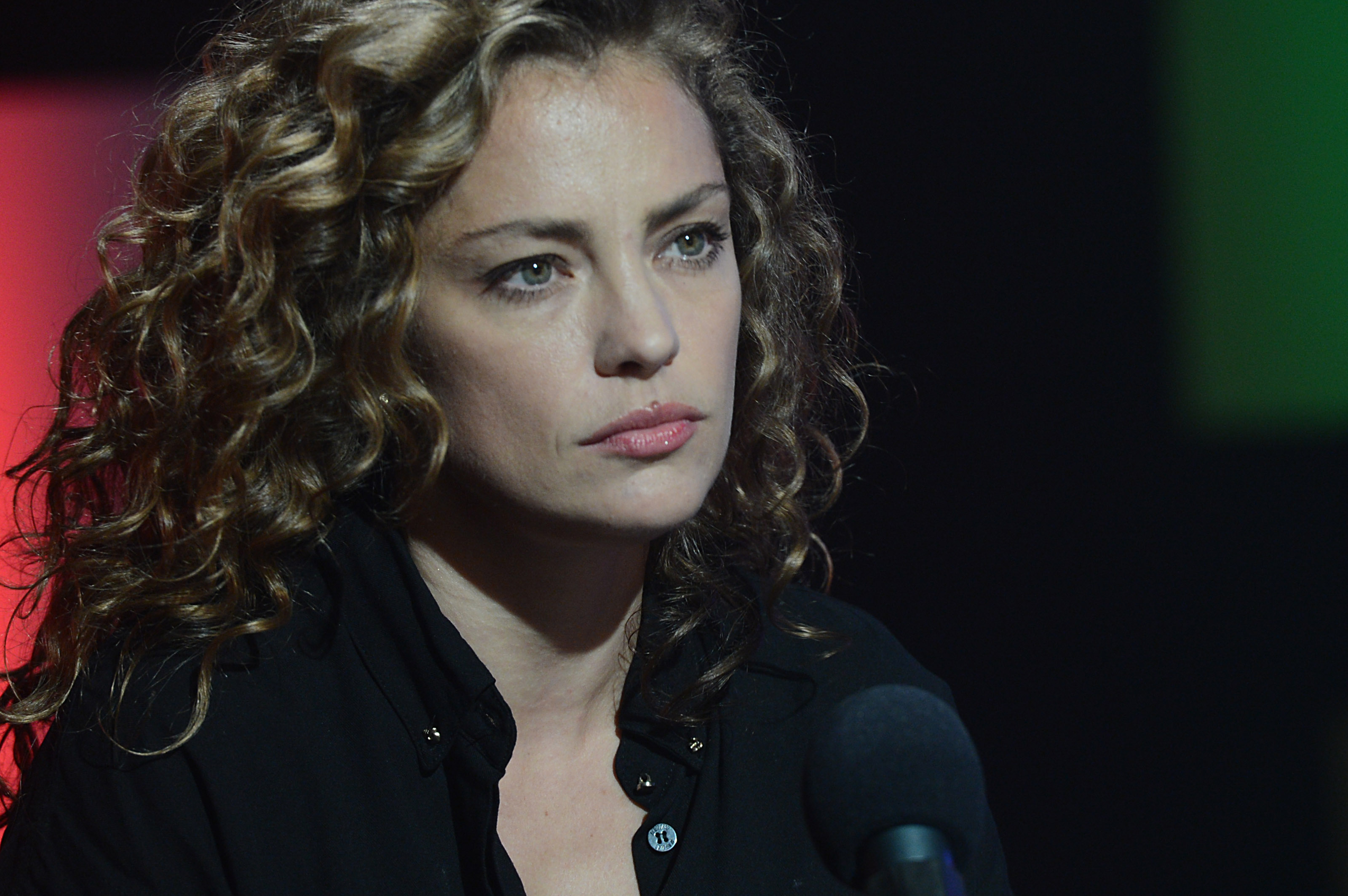
Fonzi in 2015

During 2006, Fonzi starred and produced the miniseries Soy tu fan which in 2010 was adapted by Canana Films in Mexico. She also starred in the series El tiempo no para by Canal 9. From 2005 to 2008 she participated in three chapters of Mujeres asesinas. Her return to television was in 2012 with her participation in Graduados the new Underground production for Telefe. In addition, she was part of the unit of TV Pública En terapia with the actors Norma Aleandro, Diego Peretti, Leonardo Sbaraglia, Ailín Salas, Julieta Cardinali and Germán Palacios. She also resumed the theater as the protagonist of the play Isósceles. That year, she also made the filming of El Crítico by Hernán Guerschuny, a co-production between HC Films and Lagarto Cine where Dolores Fonzi had the lead alongside Rafael Spregelburd. On television she participated as a guest actress in two episodes of the series Aliados.

In 2015 Fonzi starred in the film Paulina, remake of the film starring Mirtha Legrand, in 1960. The film had a strong box office collection and favorable reviews, being praised at the Cannes Festival. For her work in the film, Fonzi was awarded the Havana Star Prize for Best Actress at the 17th Havana Film Festival New York. She also acted in Truman film starring Ricardo Darín. In 2016 she was part of the cast of the series of La Leona, she played Eugenia Leone.

== Personal life ==
From 2008 to 2014, Fonzi was in a relationship with actor Gael García Bernal, whom she met on the set of the 2001 film Private Lives. They had two children respectively born in 2009 and 2011. Afterwards, Fonzi entered a relationship with filmmaker Santiago Mitre, whom she met during the filming of Paulina in 2014.

== Filmography ==
=== Television ===
Year	Title	Character	Channel
1996	La nena	Sol	Canal 9
1996	Por siempre mujercitas	Candela	Canal 9
1997	Ricos y Famosos	Gina	Canal 9
1998-1999	Verano del '98	Clara Vázquez	Telefe
1999	Cabecita	María González	Telefe
2000	Tiempo final	Tamara	Telefe
2001	El sodero de mi vida	Romina Muzzopappa	Canal 13
2002	Final del juego		Canal 13
2002	Historias de no creer	Paola	Canal (á)
2003	Disputas	Gala	Telefe
2003	Mujeres en rojo: Fama	Rocío	Telefe
2004	Sangre fría	Renata	Telefe
2005	Mujeres asesinas	Claudia Sobrero	Canal 13
2006	El tiempo no para	Lorena "Lola" Giglione	Canal 9
2006	Soy tu fan	Carla "Charly" García	Canal 9
2007	Mujeres asesinas	Consuelo	Canal 13
2008	Mujeres asesinas	Marcela	Canal 13
2012	Graduados	Azul Vega	Telefe
2012-2013	En terapia	Ana Irigoyen	TV Pública
2013	Aliados	Female Creative Energy	Telefe
2016	La Leona	Eugenia Leone	Telefe
2020	Puerta 7	Diana	Canal 13/Netflix

=== Movies ===
Year	Movie	Character	Director
2000	Burnt Money	Vivi	Marcelo Piñeyro
2000	Waiting for the Messiah	Any	Daniel Burman
2001	Vidas privadas	Ana Uranga	Fito Páez
2001	Caja negra	Dorotea	Luis Ortega
2001	Gerente en dos ciudades	Carmela	Diego Soffici
2003	Bottom of the Sea	Ana	Damián Szifron
2005	The Aura	Diana Dietrich	Fabián Bielinsky
2007	La mujer rota	Camila	Sebastián Faena
2008	Salamandra	Alba	Pablo Agüero
2008	El club de la muerte	Selma	James Merendino
2012	El campo	Elisa	Hernán Belón
2013	El crítico	Sofía	Hernán Guerschuny
2015	Paulina	Paulina	Santiago Mitre
2015	Truman	Paula	Cesc Gay
2017	Nieve negra	Sabrina	Martín Hodara
2017	La cordillera	Marina Blanco	Santiago Mitre
2017	The Future Ahead	Romina	Constanza Novick
2017	Restos de viento	Carmen	Jimena Montemayor
2018	La misma sangre	Carla	Miguel Cohan
2018	Claudia	Claudia	Sebastián De Caro
2019	The Moneychanger	Gudrun	Federico Veiroj
2021	Fever Dream	Carola	Claudia Llosa
2024	Feeling Better	Lei	Valerio Mastandrea
2025	Belén	Soledad Deza	Herself

=== Theater ===
Year	Title	Director	Theater
2000	El señor Bergman y Dios	Roberto Castro	Teatro Municipal General San Martín
2001	Amanda y Eduardo	Roberto Villanueva	Teatro Municipal General San Martín
2003	Dios Perro	Alejandra Ciurlanti	Centro Cultural Recoleta
2012	Isósceles	Mariana Chaud	Teatro El Extranjero

=== Videoclips ===
Year	Artist	Song
2003	Fito Páez feat. Luis Alberto Spinetta	Bello abril
2012	Leandro Fresco	Algún día

== Accolades ==
Year	Award	Category	Work	Result	Ref.
2004	52nd Silver Condor Awards	Best Supporting Actress	Bottom of the Sea	Nominated	
2013	61st Silver Condor Awards	Best Actress	In the Open	Nominated	
2015	10th Sur Awards	Best Actress	Paulina	Won	
2015	2nd Fénix Awards	Best Actress	Paulina	Won	
2016	3rd Feroz Awards	Best Supporting Actress in a Film	Truman	Nominated	
2016	8th Gaudí Awards	Best Supporting Actress	Truman	Won	
2016	3rd Platino Awards	Best Actress	Paulina	Won	
2016	64th Silver Condor Awards	Best Actress	Paulina	Won	
2024	11th Platino Awards	Best Actress	Blondi	Nominated	
2024	18th Sur Awards	Best Director	Blondi	Nominated	
2024	18th Sur Awards	Best Actress	Blondi	Won	
2024	18th Sur Awards	Best Original Screenplay	Blondi	Nominated	
2026	13th Platino Awards	Best Director	Belén	Nominated	
2026	13th Platino Awards	Best Actress	Belén	Nominated	
2026	20th Sur Awards	Best Director	Belén	Nominated	
2026	20th Sur Awards	Best Adapted Screenplay	Belén	Won	
2026	20th Sur Awards	Best Actress	Belén	Nominated	
