= The Crimes That Bind =

The Crimes That Bind may refer to:

- The Crimes That Bind (novel), or Inori no Maku ga Oriru Toki (祈りの幕が下りる時), novel by Keigo Higashino
- The Crimes That Bind (2018 film), 2018 Japanese film
- The Crimes That Bind (2020 film), 2020 Argentine film
