= The Future Ahead =

2017 film

- Film poster
- Directed by: Constanza Novick
- Written by: Constanza Novick
- Starring: Dolores Fonzi
- Release date: 8 September 2017 (TIFF)
- Country: Argentina
- Language: Spanish

The Future Ahead (Spanish: El futuro que viene) is a 2017 Argentine drama film directed by Constanza Novick. It was screened in the Discovery section at the 2017 Toronto International Film Festival.

== Cast ==
- Dolores Fonzi as Romina
- Pilar Gamboa as Florencia
