= The Crimes That Bind (2020 film) =

2020 Argentine films

- Film poster
- Spanish: Crímenes de familia
- Directed by: Sebastián Schindel
- Written by: Pablo Del Teso; Sebastián Schindel
- Starring: Cecilia Roth; Miguel Ángel Solá; Sofía Gala Castiglione
- Production companies: Buffalo Films; Magoya Films; Tieless Media
- Distributed by: Netflix
- Release date: August 20, 2020
- Running time: 99 minutes
- Country: Argentina
- Language: Spanish

The Crimes That Bind (Spanish: Crímenes de familia) is a 2020 Argentine psychological thriller film directed by Sebastián Schindel, written by Pablo Del Teso and Sebastián Schindel and starring Cecilia Roth, Miguel Ángel Solá and Sofía Gala Castiglione. The Crimes That Bind was released on August 20, 2020 on Netflix.

== Plot ==
In this understated film, Alicia, played by Cecilia Roth, the mother of Daniel, played by Benjamín Amadeo, is blinded by her unconditional love for her 35-year-old son, and unable to even consider the possibility that he could be guilty of assault, rape, stalking, and violence against women. The film begins with Alicia hosting her socialite friends in their Buenos Aires, Argentina apartment in one of the capital city's most luxurious neighborhoods, where she lives with her 70-year-old retired engineer husband, Ignacio, played by Miguel Ángel Solá, her live-in maid Gladys, played by Yanina Ávila, and Gladys's 3-year old son, Santiago (Santi), who calls Alicia Auntie. Gladys has a humble background. Her mother died when she was about three or four years old and she lived with her father, who neglected and abused her in a remote forested area. She became an unpaid servant to her father's second wife and her step-siblings until her teen years, when she escaped to Buenos Aires with the help of a neighbor, where she was hired by Alicia.

Both Alicia and her husband are portrayed as dignified and courteous, while Gladys is portrayed as "simple" and slow. These assumptions are unsettled as the story unfolds involving two court cases and prison sentences. Daniel stands trial and is imprisoned for the attempted murder of his ex-wife, Marcela, played by Sofía Gala Castiglione. Gladys is accused and convicted of murder for suffocating her newborn baby in her living quarters in Alicia and Ignacio's home. For most of the film, Gladys is portrayed as a passive, emotionless prisoner, who remains silent in her own defense, which makes it impossible for her lawyer, Vieytes, to help her. She receives a particularly harsh punishment of 17 years of imprisonment. Alicia is present in both courtrooms. At the conclusion of Gladys's trial, to Vieytes' surprise, Gladys makes a statement in which she apologizes to Alicia for the mistreatment she has been subjected to in court and thanks Alicia for taking such good care of Santi. She asks the court to grant Alicia custody of Santi.

In Daniel's court case, evidence against him mounts, and it appears that he will be found guilty. Alicia's wealthier friends abandon her. The administration at Santi's expensive preschool tells her that she should enroll him in a school with more diversity where he would better fit in. In her confusion and in desperation to help her son, who she believes to be innocent, Alicia decides to hire an expensive criminal defense lawyer. Ignacio warns Alicia that the lawyer she wants to hire is unscrupulous. He is known for using expensive bribes and other means outside the courts to win his cases. When she tells Ignacio that she wants to downsize to a less expensive apartment and to cut spending in order to hire this lawyer, Ignacio tells her that he is leaving her.

Santi misses his mother, Gladys. Alicia takes him to the prison where Gladys is held. It is her first visit with Gladys since she was imprisoned. Alicia had strongly criticized Gladys for her actions when she testified against her in court. She also lied under oath when she denied warning Gladys that if she got pregnant a second time there would be consequences. Vieytes suggested that Gladys' motivation for killing her own newborn was partly out of fear of losing both her secure job and her housing. During the prison visit, Gladys tells Alicia that Daniel had come to their home during a period in which he had been estranged from his parents. He had asked to come in and Gladys had let him. He then stole money from his parents and raped Gladys, leaving her pregnant. Daniel threatened to hurt Gladys and Santi if she told Alicia or anyone what he had done. The baby she killed was Alicia's grandson, and Gladys wanted Alicia to accept custody of Santi.

As part of her inner journey, which leads to accepting that her son is the perpetrator, not a victim in the crimes against his ex-wife, his young child, and Gladys, Alicia begins to understand more about the complexity of violence against women from the psychologist and activist played by Paola Barrientos. As Alicia comes to understand the full implication of what Gladys had told her, she becomes an ally for both of Daniel's victims, Marcela and Gladys. She provides Marcela, and by extension, Gladys, with the crucial evidence Marcela needs to win her case against Daniel—evidence that Alicia had acquired as part of the $400,000 fee to the lawyer who had succeeded in getting Daniel released from prison by suppressing evidence.

In one of the final scenes, Alicia, the psychologist and Vieytes are entering the courtroom where Gladys is appealing her sentence. The film ends with Alicia attending a family gathering with Santi, Marcela, and Alicia's grandson, with Marcela's family and friends, in a much humbler but happier home than that in which the film begins.

== Cast ==
- Cecilia Roth as Alicia Campos
- Miguel Ángel Solá as Ignacio Arrieta
- Benjamín Amadeo as Daniel Arrieta
- Sofía Gala Castiglione as Marcela Sosa (as Sofía Gala)
- Yanina Ávila as Gladys Pereyra
- Paola Barrientos as Psychology
- Diego Cremonesi as Esteban Palleros
- Marcelo Subiotto as Pedro Vieytes
- Santiago Ávila as Santiago Pereyra
- Alisa Reyes as Marcela (voice)

== Reviews ==
A review in Media, Entertainment, Arts, WorldWide (MEAWW), described the film as an "enthralling" and "enticing crime drama".

According to the Film Affinity site, critic Diego Batlle said it was a "remarkable", "rigorous, ambitious and intelligent" "judicial thriller"; John Serba, in the Decider, said that the setting, characters and theme made it "absorbing" if not "always original or well written".

A review in La Nación called it a "solid psychological thriller".

One The New York Times's review called it a "gloomy melodrama" and compared it to the 2019 Netflix film The Son, by the same director, Sebastián Schindel.

== See also ==
- The Son
