= Sbaraglia =

Sbaraglia is a surname. Notable people with the surname include:

- Giovanni Girolamo Sbaraglia (1641–1710), Italian physician and writer
- Leonardo Sbaraglia (born 1970), Argentine actor
