= Private Lives (2001 film) =

- Film poster
- Spanish: Vidas privadas
- Directed by: Fito Páez
- Screenplay by: Alan Pauls; Fito Páez
- Produced by: Stephane Sorlat (co-producer)
- Starring: Cecilia Roth; Gael García Bernal; Héctor Alterio; Luis Ziembrowski; Chunchuna Villafañe; Dolores Fonzi
- Cinematography: Andrés Mazzon
- Edited by: Fernando Pardo
- Music by: Rodolfo Gandini; Fito Páez
- Production companies: Circo Beat; Mate Production
- Release dates: September 2001 (Zinemaldia); 2 November 2001 (Spain); 25 April 2002 (Argentina)
- Running time: 97 minutes
- Countries: Argentina; Spain
- Language: Spanish

Private Lives (Spanish: Vidas privadas) is a 2001 Argentine-Spanish melodrama film directed by Fito Páez (in his directorial debut feature) from a screenplay he co-wrote with Alan Pauls. It stars Cecilia Roth and Gael García Bernal.

== Plot ==
Exiled in Madrid, emotionally repressed Carmen Uranga returns to Buenos Aires to visit her ailing father, becoming acquainted with male prostitute Gustavo, whom she hires in order to satisfy her paraphilia, a strange case of phonophilia, eliciting suspicion from her younger sister Ana.

== Cast ==
- Cecilia Roth as Carmen Uranga
- Gael García Bernal as Gustavo
- Luis Ziembrowski as Alejandro
- Chunchuna Villafañe as Sofía
- Héctor Alterio as padre de Carmen ('Carmen's father')
- Dolores Fonzi as Ana
- Lito Cruz as Rodolfo
- Carola Reyna
- Luis Machín

== Production ==
Back to when Páez first thought about shooting the film, he originally targeted Marisa Paredes and Juan Diego Botto to star in the main roles eventually played by Roth and García Bernal. The film is an Argentine-Spanish co-production by Circo Beat and Mate Production, with the participation of Vía Digital. It was shot in Buenos Aires.

== Release ==
The film was presented in the 'New Directors' section of the 49th San Sebastián International Film Festival in September 2001. It was released theatrically in Spain on 2 November 2001 and in Argentina on 25 April 2002.

== Reception ==
David Rooney of Variety considered the film to display "risible dramatic material" and advised Páez to best "hang onto his day job".

Casimiro Torreiro of El País assessed that the film wrecks because of several reasons, including "clumsy writing", with "too many buts that undermine the credibility" of the film.

The review in La Nación gave Private Lives a 'so-so' rating, writing that the "irregular, chaotic, frayed" film "alternates between some passages of great dramatic power and others that are dispensable".

Jorge de Cominges of Fotogramas rated the film 3 out of 5 stars, citing the performances by García Bernal and Villafañe and as the best things about the film, while pointing out at the absence of a final climax as a negative point.

== Accolades ==
Year	Award	Category	Nominee(s)	Result	Ref.
2003	51st Silver Condor Awards	Best Supporting Actress	Chunchuna Villafañe	Nominated	

== See also ==
- List of Spanish films of 2001
- List of Argentine films of 2002
