= Phase 7 =

- Theatrical release poster
- Fase 7
- Directed by: Nicolás Goldbart
- Written by: Nicolás Goldbart
- Produced by: Sebastian Aloi
- Starring: Daniel Hendler; Jazmín Stuart; Yayo Guridi; Federico Luppi; Carlos Bermejo; Abian Vainstein
- Cinematography: Lucio Bonelli
- Edited by: Pablo Barbieri Carrera; Nicolás Goldbart
- Music by: Guillermo Guareschi
- Production companies: Aeroplano Cine; Instituto Nacional de Cine y Artes Audiovisuales (INCAA); Televisión Federal (Telefe)
- Distributed by: Energía Entusiasta (Argentina); Salient Media (USA)
- Release dates: 10 October 2010 (SFF); 3 March 2011 (Argentina)
- Running time: 95 minutes
- Country: Argentina
- Language: Spanish
- Box office: $158,421 (Argentina)

Phase 7 (Spanish: Fase 7) is a 2010 Argentine science fiction black comedy film written and directed by Nicolas Goldbart and starring Daniel Hendler, Yayo Guridi, Jazmín Stuart, and Federico Luppi.

== Plot ==
Coco and his pregnant wife Pipi move into a Buenos Aires apartment complex. As they bicker and shop for food at the local market, they fail to notice the increasingly panicked crowds around them. When they return to their apartment, it is quarantined by the government. Coco, too apathetic to care about the looming threat of a pandemic, attempts to sleep through the disaster, but he is quickly annoyed by the loss of Internet service and television.

His neighbor Horatio, a paranoid survivalist whose reinforced apartment doubles as a bunker, slowly recruits Coco as an ally against other tenants. With Coco's help, Horatio sets traps throughout the building, which Coco negligently trips several times. Still unconvinced of the danger of the situation, Coco halfheartedly submits to Horatio's demands that he wear a hazmat suit, carry a pistol, and watch a survival training video that suggests the pandemic may be a plot by the New World Order.

Zanutto, an elderly man who is suspected of being sick by other tenants, is perceived as a weak target that they can prey upon. After using a shotgun to dispatch the tenants who came to harm him, Zanutto becomes paranoid, which leads him to preemptively pursue the remaining tenants. Horatio convinces Coco to leave Pipi and help him confront Zanutto, but Coco proves to be an inept ally. After a tense shootout, Zanutto slashes Horatio, but Horatio mortally stabs Zanutto. Zanutto and Coco work out a truce, and Zanutto asks Coco to watch his dachshund dog before he crawls into his car and succumbs to the knife wound. Soon after Horatio and Coco go scavenging out of the complex, and finally Coco proves his worth by defending Horatio against armed men who attack the duo, shooting and killing the aggressors.

Horatio, visibly weakened from his wound, and worried about his contact with a sick and contagious Zanutto, tells Coco that he believes he is infected and asks him to take care of his daughter and to take her and Pipi out of the city, to a secret hideout Horatio made. Horatio reveals the location of the hideout, but Coco does not feel ready to take over Horatio's lead. Coco's refusal and indifference enrages Horatio, who now blames Coco as to just have been using him to survive. Horatio stabs Coco, hoping that Coco will kill him before he succumbs to the disease. Despite his wound Coco flees from Horatio, and the Chinese father of the family that was presumed to be absent from the building suddenly appears and shoots Horatio through the neck. While dying in the building's stairwell Horatio smiles satisfied, having avoided a ghastly death from the disease. Coco, the Chinese family, and the remaining survivors of the complex use Horatio's armored vehicle to make their way to Horatio's hideout.

== Cast ==
- Daniel Hendler as Coco
- Jazmín Stuart as Pipi
- Yayo Guridi as Horacio
- Federico Luppi as Zanutto
- Carlos Bermejo as Guglierini
- Abian Vainstein as Lange

== Release ==
Phase 7 premiered at Sitges Film Festival on 10 October 2010. It was released theatrically in Argentina 3 March 2011, where it grossed $158,421. The U.S. premiere was at SXSW in March 2011, after which it received a limited theatrical release in July. It was released on DVD on October 4, 2011, as part of the Bloody Disgusting Selects line.

== Reception ==
Rotten Tomatoes, a review aggregator, reports that 71% of seven surveyed critics gave the film a positive review; the average rating was 6.1/10. Rob Nelson of Variety wrote that the film "lacks sufficient satiric energy to distinguish itself from countless other entries in the self-parodic, bio-apocalyptic subgenre."

George Lang of The Oklahoman wrote, "Phase 7 does not redefine its genre, but it provides a goofy counterpoint to Stephen King's The Stand, showing that the slack and incompetent could inherit the Earth." Peter Keough of The Phoenix rated it 3/4 stars and wrote that the film, though derivative, "distinguishes itself by its suffocating setting, its low-affect tone, and its cast of flaky characters."

Chris Hewitt of the St. Paul Pioneer Press praised Federico Luppi's acting but said that the film is "just not scary." Peter Martin of Twitch Film called it "a very dry parody with a relatively modest pay-off". Bill Gibron of Pop Matters rated it 7/10 stars and wrote, "Before it blunders its way through the ending, Phase 7 is a very smart and very clever film. Once it's over, the inherent issues become more and more obvious." Josh Rode of DVD Verdict called it "a lightly amusing yet violent study of humankind's baser nature."

=== Awards ===
Goldbart won Best Screenplay at Sitges.
