= Nicolás Goldbart =

Argentine Film director and film editor

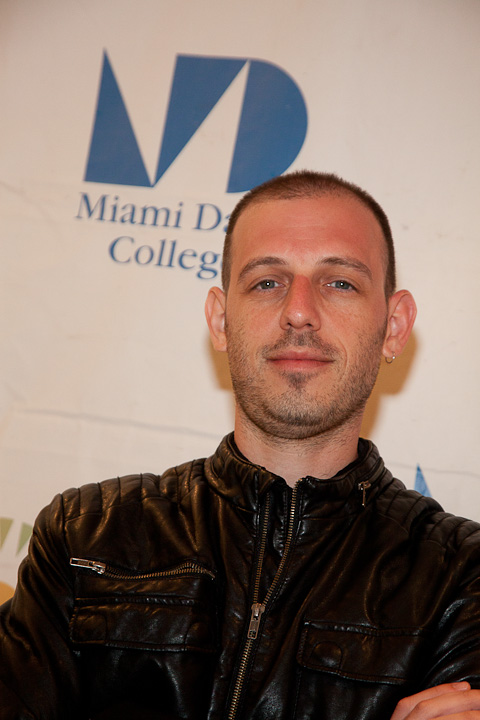
- Goldbart at the 2011 Miami International Film Festival showing of Phase 7
- Occupations: Film director, film editor

Nicolás Goldbart is an Argentine film director and editor.

He wrote and directed the film Phase 7 (2011). Some of the films he has edited have been critically well received, such as El bonaerense (2002) and El custodio (2006).

== Filmography ==
- Mundo grúa (1999) aka Crane World
- Bonanza (En vías de extinción) (2001)
- Modelo 73 (2001)
- Naikor, la estación de servicio (2001)
- El descanso (2002)
- El bonaerense (2002)
- Kill (2002)
- Hoy y mañana (2003) aka Today and Tomorrow
- El fondo del mar (2003) aka The Bottom of the Sea
- Familia rodante (2004) aka Rolling Family
- Historias breves IV: Más quel mundo (2004) aka More Than the World
- Sofacama (2006) aka Sofabed
- El custodio (2006) aka The Minder
- The Paranoids (2008)
- Fase 7 (2011) aka Phase 7
- La cordillera (2017)
- 27 Nights (2025)
- A Loose End (2025)
