= Ariel Rotter =

Argentine film director

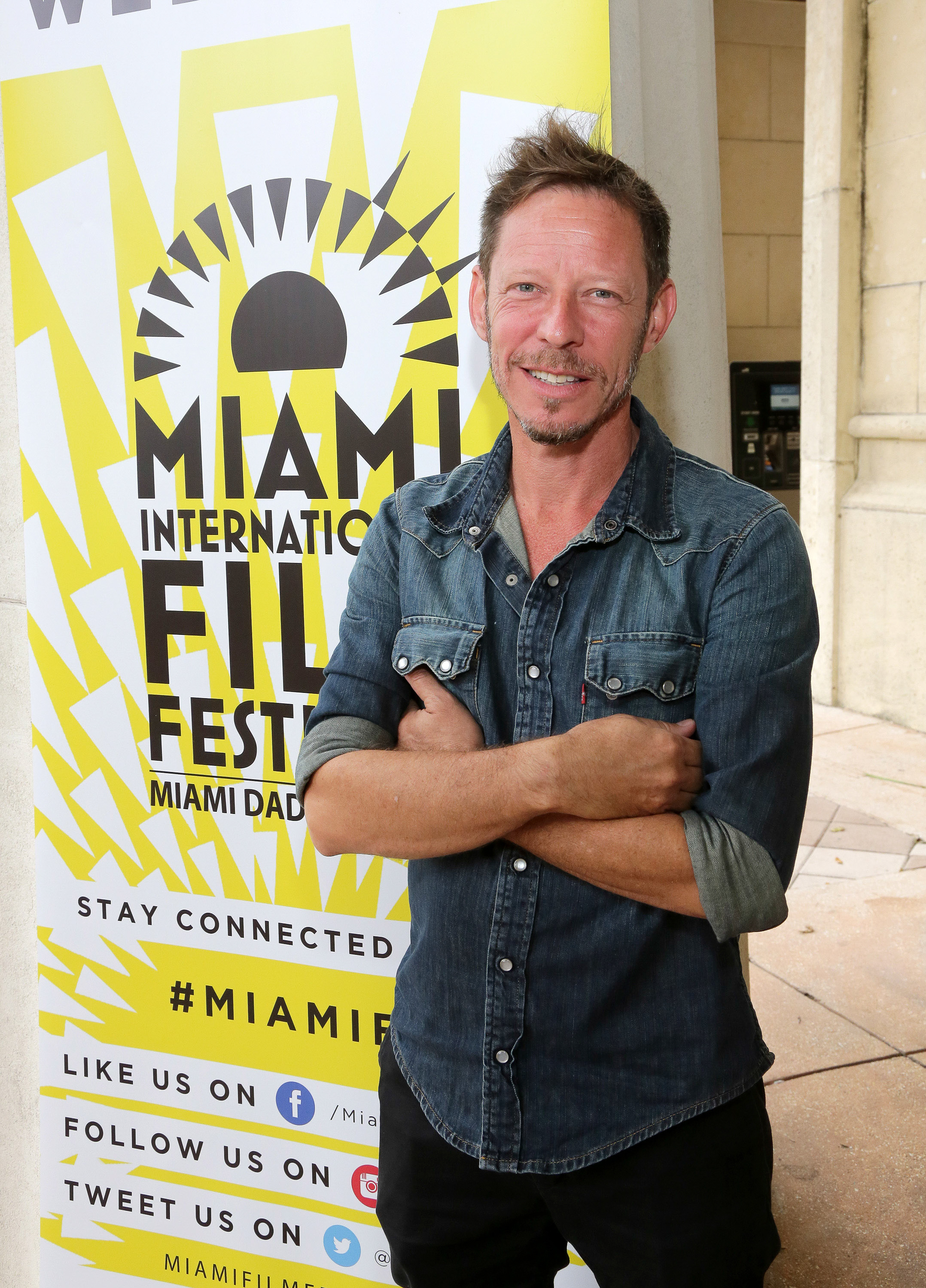
Rotter at the 2016 Miami International Film Festival showing of Incident Light

Ariel Héctor Rotter (born June 18, 1971 in Buenos Aires, Argentina) is a film director and screenplay writer.

He works in the cinema of Argentina.

== Filmography ==
- Sólo por hoy (2001) a.k.a. Just for Today
- The Other (2007) a.k.a. El Otro
- Incident Light (2015)

== Awards ==
Wins

- Bogota Film Festival: Silver Precolumbian Circle; for Sólo por hoy; 2001.
- Fribourg International Film Festival: E-Changer Award - Special Mention; for Sólo por hoy; 2001.
- Toulouse Latin America Film Festival: Audience Award; for Sólo por hoy; 2001.
- Berlin International Film Festival: Silver Bear, The Jury Grand Prix; 2007.
