= The Minder =

- Theatrical release poster
- Directed by: Rodrigo Moreno
- Written by: Rodrigo Moreno
- Produced by: Hernán Musaluppi; Luis A. Sartor; Natacha Cervi
- Starring: Julio Chávez; Osmar Núñez
- Cinematography: Bárbara Álvarez
- Edited by: Nicolás Goldbart
- Music by: Federico Jusid
- Distributed by: The Match Factory
- Release date: February 13, 2006 (Berlinale)
- Running time: 95 minutes
- Countries: Argentina; France; Germany; Uruguay
- Language: Spanish

The Minder (Spanish: El custodio) is a 2005 Argentine drama film directed by Rodrigo Moreno. It was co-produced by Argentina, Uruguay, France and Germany. (In English the title literally means: "The Bodyguard.")

The motion picture features Julio Chávez as the bodyguard, and Osmar Núñez as the man he protects for a living. The film tells of bodyguard Rubén, who is in charge of protecting Artemio, the Argentine's Minister of Planification.

== Plot ==
Rubén (Chávez) is excellent in his job, but in the midst of an existentialist crisis, he begins to suffer from the emptiness of his life - having sworn to protect Artemio (Núñez), a man who barely acknowledges his presence or merit; a man with whom, in fact, has little dialogue or contact throughout the movie, even when they share the screen most of the time.

Rubén has little to no private life as well: his sister is a wreck, her daughter, spoiled; he visits prostitutes in his spare time and is unappreciated by those who surround him at work. His only real relationship is Artemio's driver, Salinas (Adrian Andrade), whose simplicity does not suffice Rubén.

Eventually, Rubén snaps: tired of his boss' infidelity to his wife, his downright hypocrisy and disdainful manner towards him, he frequents an illegal arms dealer, purchasing a gun with a silencer. When his boss suffers a heart attack, Rubén is left to take care of him, and soon he shoots Artemio offhand - the one person who is supposed to protect him from a threat that remains invisible in the film. He then runs away to Mar del Plata, where the last scene has Rubén contemplating the sea he never swam (foreshadowed earlier, during a visit to the city).

== Cast ==
- Julio Chávez as Rubén
- Osmar Núñez as Artemio
- Marcelo D'Andrea as Andrea
- Adrian Andrade as Salinas
- Elvira Onetto as Delia
- Cristina Villamor as Beatriz
- Luciana Lifschitz as Sobrina

== Background ==
Screenplay writer and director Moreno shoots the film from Ruben's point of view. He also relies on lengthy, static takes in order to capture the emptiness of the bodyguard's life.

=== Themes ===
Loneliness and angst are the central themes of this movie. The story has a slow pace, with still shots channeling Rubén's quiet pain as he is usually separated from the main crowd. The action takes place far away from the camera; we are left with lonely Rubén contemplating the events from afar. The cold surroundings are quickly replaced with warmth, music and dialogue whenever he approaches the ongoing action (the ministry, surrounded by his cohorts or friends; as well as her sister and family).

A recurrent theme has Rubén being unable to walk through any door while on screen.

== Filming locations ==
The film was filmed in Buenos Aires and Mar del Plata, Argentina.

== Distribution ==
The film was first featured at the Berlin International Film Festival on February 13, 2006. Later it screened at the Toulouse Latin America Film Festival, France, on March 22, 2006.

In the United States the film opened on March 22, 2007.

The picture was also shown at various film festivals, including: the Alba Regia International Film Festival, Romania; the Transilvania International Film Festival, Czech Republic; the Karlovy Vary Film Festival, Netherlands; the Dubai International Film Festival, Dubai; the Uruguayan Film Festival; the Santiago International Film Festival, Chile; the Arras Film Festival, France, and others.

Release dates by country of production

- Argentina: April 6, 2006
- France: April 7, 2007
- Germany: May 24, 2007
- Uruguay: April 1, 2006

== Critical reception ==
Diego Lerer, film critic for Argentina's daily Clarín, lauded Moreno's innovative directorial effort and wrote, "The movie is a triumph of mise-en-scene. Each shot has a reason to exist since Ruben's point-of-view is always respected, and the images and sounds we perceive reveal more about his inner life than any conversation or explanation...[the] great thing about Moreno...is that the so-called Argentine new wave is still able to produce films that are thought to be provoking, different and challenging. "

Critic Deborah Young, critic for Variety magazine, also liked Moreno's directorial work and his cinema group's technical effort and wrote, "One of the more admirable aspects of the film is Moreno's tight control over the camera work and editing. Cinematographer Barbara Alvarez uses the sterility of fixed frame shots and desaturated colors as correlates to the protag's compulsively rule-driven life. Nicolas Goldbart's editing gives the story a steady, somewhat numbing rhythm."

When the film was featured at the Uruguayan Film Festival, critic Mariana Amieva wrote, "Rodrigo Moreno, showcases the excellent work of Julio Chávez, one of the best Argentine actors around today. The story focuses on one of those characters that always goes unnoticed, in this case a grey bodyguard." Yet, she believes the film "becomes a little lost" at the end.

== Soundtrack ==
All music in the film is diegetic; that is, exists within the fiction of the movie, and is not part of the soundtrack.

The exception is the part in the film where Ruben's niece is forced to stop singing karaoke, and then in the next scene, in a place that's not in the karaoke restaurant, the unaccompanied karaoke instrumental track continues in the background.

== Awards ==
Wins

- Berlin International Film Festival: Alfred Bauer Prize, Rodrigo Moreno; 2006.
- Bogota Film Festival: Golden Precolumbian Circle; Best Director, Rodrigo Moreno; Best Film, Rodrigo Moreno; Honorable Mention, Best Actor, Julio Chávez; 2006.
- Donostia-San Sebastián International Film Festival: Horizons Award, Rodrigo Moreno; 2006.

Nominations

- Berlin International Film Festival: Golden Berlin Bear; Rodrigo Moreno; 2006.
