= The Games of Countess Dolingen =

- Directed by: Catherine Binet
- Written by: Catherine Binet
- Starring: Carol Kane; Michael Lonsdale
- Cinematography: William Lubtchansky
- Music by: Carlos d'Alessio
- Release date: 1981
- Language: French

The Games of Countess Dolingen (French: Les Jeux de la comtesse Dolingen de Gratz) is a 1981 French fantasy-drama film written and directed by Catherine Binet and starring Carol Kane.

The film was entered into the main competition at the 38th edition of the Venice Film Festival.

== Cast ==
- Carol Kane as Louise Haines-Pearson
- Michael Lonsdale as Bertrand Haines-Pearson
- Marina Vlady as the mother of the little girl
- Marilú Marini as Countess Dolingen de Gratz / the maid
- Robert Stephens as the professor
- Roberto Plate as the traveler / the thief / the stranger
- Katia Wastchenko as the little girl
- Emmanuelle Riva as a guest

== Production ==
Katia Wastchenko remembers the making of the film as "an enjoyable experience", and describes Binet and the rest of the crew as "very kind". Although she had not read 'Sombre Printemps' and was, at the age of 12, "too young to be curious or interested about Unica Zürn's life", Wastchenko said that Binet "took the time to explain to her the context of the most 'sensual' scenes", and helped her to approach the role by confiding some of her own childhood memories.
