= The Effect of Love =

2007 film directed by Eliseo Subiela

- Directed by: Eliseo Subiela
- Written by: Eliseo Subiela
- Produced by: Martín Mahuvezin; Facundo Valdivieso; Lucía Viera
- Starring: Sofía Gala; Guillermo Pfening; Romina Ricci; Norma Argentina; Julio Arrieta
- Cinematography: Marc Cuixart
- Edited by: Marcela Sáenz
- Music by: Julián Vat
- Production company: San Luis Cine
- Distributed by: Primer Plano Film Group
- Release date: August 16, 2007
- Running time: 94 minutes
- Country: Argentina
- Language: Spanish

The Effect of Love (Spanish: El resultado del amor) is a 2007 Argentinian drama film, written and directed by Eliseo Subiela and starring Sofía Gala and Guillermo Pfening. The film was shot in the Buenos Aires and San Luis provinces of Argentina.

== Synopsis ==
Mabel (Sofía Gala) is a young girl who was raped in the chapel of the shantytown where she lives. After some time passes she becomes a clown performer and a prostitute. Martín (Guillermo Pfening) is a lawyer who is recently separated from his wife and has chosen to leave his father's law firm. Mabel and Martín meet and eventually fall in love, also moving out to the city, but soon after Mabel discovers she is a HIV virus carrier, putting a new strain on their relationship.

== Awards and nominations ==
- The Argentine Film Critics Association awarded Sofía Gala a Silver Condor for Best New Actress in 2008.
- Silver Colon for Best Actress in 2007 Festival de Cine Iberoamericano de Huelva.
- Sofía Gala was nominated for a Clarín Award in 2007 for Best New Actress.
- Eliseo Subiela was nominated for Golden Colon in 2007 Festival de Cine Iberoamericano de Huelva.
