= A Year Without Love =

2005 Argentine movie

- Spanish: Un año sin amor
- Directed by: Anahí Berneri
- Written by: Anahi Berneri; Pablo Pérez
- Produced by: Daniel Burman; Diego Dubcovsky
- Starring: Juan Minujín; Mimí Ardú
- Cinematography: Lucio Bonelli
- Edited by: Alex Zito
- Music by: Martín Bauer; Leo García
- Distributed by: Distribution Company; BD Cine
- Release date: 2005
- Running time: 102 minutes
- Country: Argentina
- Language: Spanish

A Year Without Love (Spanish: Un año sin amor) is a 2005 Argentine drama film directed by Anahí Berneri, and written by Berneri and Pablo Pérez, adapting Pérez's autobiographical novel of the same title.

The plot follows Pablo, a writer dealing with loneliness and AIDS. Yearning for love, he places ads in a gay magazine and finds himself involved in the secretive world of Buenos Aires gay leather scene.

A Year Without Love played the international and gay and lesbian film festival circuits, garnering a number of awards including the Teddy Bear prize for the Best Gay Film at the 2005 Berlin Film Festival.

== Plot ==
Pablo is a struggling poet who is living with HIV in Buenos Aires. Over the course of a year he deals with issues relating to his health, his family, his search for love and his developing involvement with leather fetishism. The year culminates with the publication of his diary in the form of a novel, Un Año sin amor.

== Cast ==
- Juan Minujín as Pablo Pérez
- Mimí Ardú as Pablo's aunt
- Carlos Echevarría as Nicolás
- Bárbara Lombardo as Julia
- Javier Van de Couter as Martín
- Osmar Núñez as Commissar Báez
- Ricardo Merkin as Pablo's father
- Carlos Portaluppi as the book editor
- Mónica Cabrera as social worker
- Ricardo Moriello as Juan
- Juan Carlos Ricci as Dr. Rizzo

== Awards ==
=== Wins ===
- Berlin International Film Festival: Teddy Award, Best Feature Film; 2005.
- Outfest: Grand Jury Award, Outstanding International Narrative Feature; 2005.
- New York Lesbian and Gay Film Festival: Best Foreign Narrative Feature; 2005.

=== Nominations ===
- Mar del Plata Film Festival: FIPRESCI Prize, Anahi Berneri; Best film; 2005.
- Argentine Film Critics Association Awards: Silver Condor Award; Best Adapted Screenplay; Best New Actor, Juan Minujín; Best Costume Design, Roberta Pesci; 2006.
