= Cowboy (2011 film) =

2011 Spanish drama film directed by Juan Minujín

- Spanish: Vaquero
- Directed by: Juan Minujín
- Written by: Facundo Agrelo; Juan Minujín
- Starring: Juan Minujín; Guillermo Arengo; Daniel Fanego
- Production companies: BD Cine; Instituto Nacional de Cine y Artes Audiovisuales (INCAA); Mirá Cine
- Release date: September 29, 2011
- Running time: 87 minutes
- Country: Argentina
- Language: Spanish

Cowboy (Spanish: Vaquero) is a 2011 film directed by Juan Minujín, written by Facundo Agrelo and Juan Minujín and starring Juan Minujín, Guillermo Arengo and Daniel Fanego. The film premiered at the 2011 Zurich Film Festival and was released on September 29, 2011.

== Cast ==
- Juan Minujín as Julián
- Guillermo Arengo
- Daniel Fanego
- Pilar Gamboa
- Brad Krupsaw as Vince
- Esteban Lamothe
- Marcelo Melingo
- Esmeralda Mitre
- Sergio Pangaro
- Leonardo Sbaraglia as Alonso
- Alberto Suárez
- Julieta Vallina
