= Érica Rivas =

Argentine actress (born 1974)

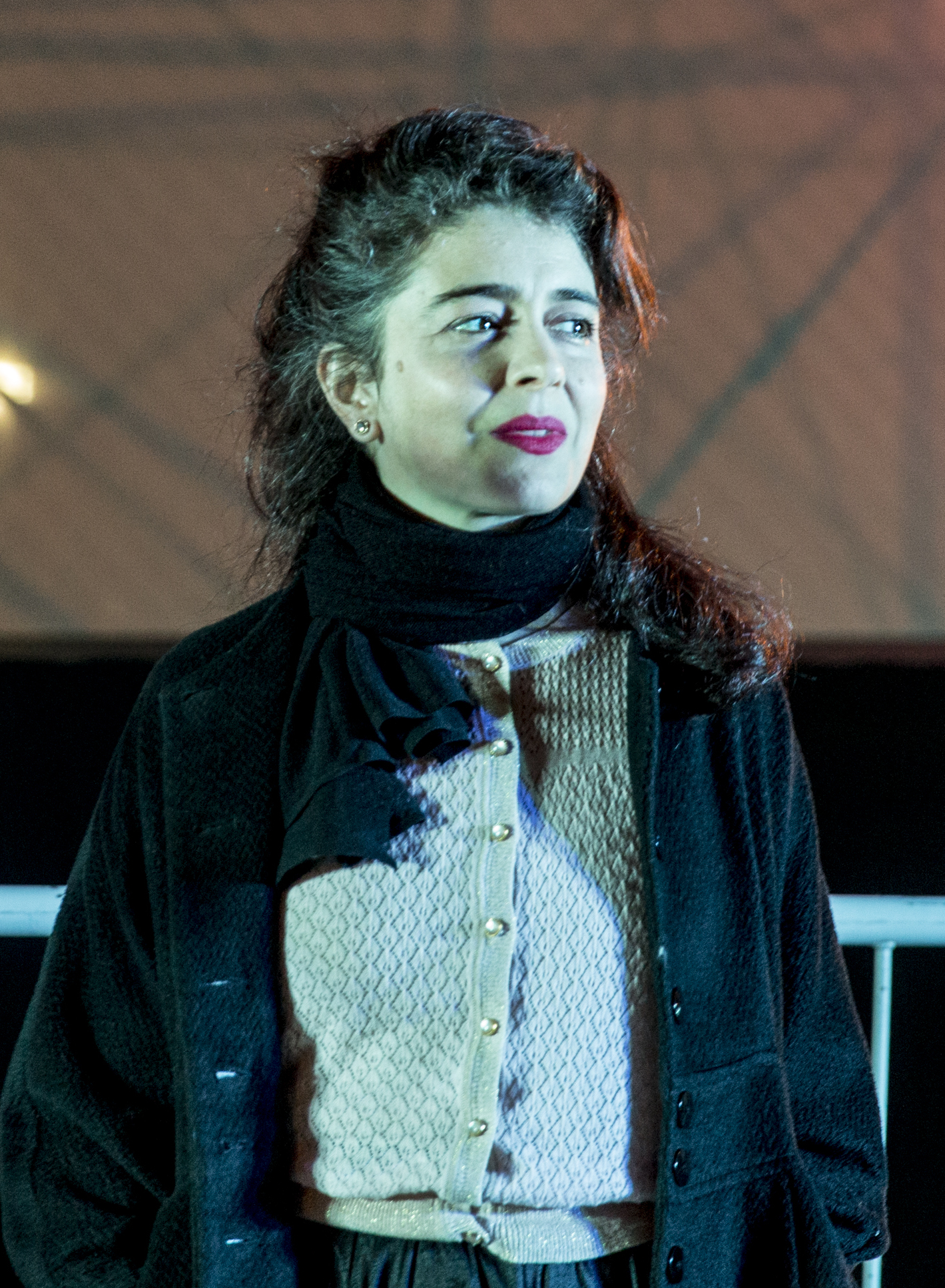
- Rivas in 2017
- Born: 1 December 1974 (age 50); Ramos Mejía, Buenos Aires, Argentina
- Occupation: Actress
- Years active: 1992–present
- Partner: Rodrigo de la Serna (1999–2010)
- Children: 1

Érica Rivas (Spanish: [ˈriβas]; born 1 December 1974) is an Argentine actress. She gained recognition for playing María Elena Fuseneco in the sitcom Casados con hijos (2005–2006) and for her role in the film Wild Tales (2014).

== Early life ==
Rivas was born on 1 December 1974 in Ramos Mejía, Buenos Aires Province. Born into a middle-class home, she is one of four siblings. Her father is an actuary and her mother is a literature professor. After graduating from high school, she pursued a degree at psychology at the University of Buenos Aires. She, however, dropped out in her fourth year to dedicate herself exclusively to acting.

== Personal life ==
Rivas lived with actor Rodrigo de la Serna (1999–2010), with whom she has a daughter.

== Filmography ==
=== Film ===
Year	Title	Role	Ref.
1995	Clorofila negra		
1996	El dedo en la llaga	Valeria	
1996	Besos en la frente	Laura	
1998	Eva en cadenas		
1999	Olympic Garage	Hija de Tigre	
2000	Gallito ciego	Fernanda	
2001	Cabeza de tigre	Mujer del Señor Castelli	
2003	Mujeres en rojo: despedida	Laura	
2005	La mitad negada		
2006	Una novia errante	Andrea	
2006	Chile 672	Silvia Locatti	
2008	My Mother's Tears	Lizzie	
2009	Toda la gente sola	Alicia	
2009	Tetro	Ana	
2009	El corridor nocturno	Clara	
2010	Antes del estreno	Juana Garner	
2010	Por tu culpa	Julieta	
2014	Wild Tales	Romina	
2014	Pistas para volver a casa	Dina	
2014	Lock Charmer	Monica	
2014	Aire libre	Julieta	
2015	Incident Light	Luisa	
2017	The Summit	Luisa Cordero	
2019	The Sleepwalkers		
2020	The Intruder	Inés	
2023	Elena sabe	Rita	

=== Television ===
Year	Title	Role	Ref.
1994	Los machos		
1995–1996	Nueve lunas		
1996	De poeta y de loco		
1997	De corazón		
1998	Archivo negro		
1998	Gasoleros		
1999	Campeones de la vida		
2000	Por ese palpitar		
2000	Calientes		
2001	El sodero de mi vida		
2002	Los simuladores		
2002	Mil millones		
2003	Sol negro		
2004	El deseo		
2005–2006	Casados con hijos	María Elena Fuseneco	
2007	Reparaciones		
2007	Televisión por la identidad		
2012	23 pares	Carmen Iturrioz	
2013	Los vecinos en guerra		

=== Theatre ===
Year	Title	Role	Venue	Ref.
1992	Acuerdo para cambiar de casa			
1993	La improvisación del alma			
1994	Cosa de locos			
1994	El tío loco			
1995	Gris de ausencia			
1996	El relámpago			
1997	Bienvenida a casa			
1998	Misterios de la corte			
2001–2002	Estoy maldita			
2003	Seis al cinco			
2005	Divagaciones			
2007	Si no fuera por esto			
2022	¿Qué pasa hoy acá?			
