= The Son (2019 Argentine film) =

2019 Spanish-language film

- Spanish: El hijo
- Directed by: Sebastián Schindel
- Written by: Leonel D'Agostino
- Based on: El hijo by Guillermo Martínez
- Produced by: Esteban Mentasti; Hori Mentasti; Guido Rud
- Starring: Joaquín Furriel; Martina Gusman; Luciano Cáceres
- Cinematography: Guillermo Nieto
- Edited by: Alejandro Parysow
- Music by: Iván Wyszogrod
- Production company: Buffalo Films
- Distributed by: Energía Entusiasta
- Release date: May 2, 2019
- Running time: 92 minutes
- Country: Argentina
- Language: Spanish

The Son (Spanish: El hijo) is a 2019 Argentine Spanish-language psychological thriller film directed by Sebastián Schindel and based on the 2013 novel Una madre protectora (English: A Protective Mother) by Guillermo Martínez with the adapted screenplay written by Leonel D’Agostino. The film was released in theaters on May 2, 2019. On July 26, 2019, the film was available to stream on Netflix in various countries.

== Synopsis ==
The film follows the story of an artist and father, who increasingly becomes paranoid at his wife's actions during her pregnancy. As they attempt to navigate through their personal issues, a child birth occurs, pushing the couple towards a path of twisted motives and deadly consequences.

== Cast ==
- Joaquín Furriel as Lorenzo Roy
- Martina Gusman as Julieta
- Luciano Cáceres as Renato
- Heidi Toini as Sigrid
- Regina Lamm as Gudrunn

== Release ==
The film was released on May 2, 2019. The film was available to stream in various countries outside of China, South Korea, Argentina and Uruguay on July 26, 2019, by Netflix.

== Reception ==
Jonathan Holland from The Hollywood Reporter mentioned in a positive review of the film, "Disturbing in the best sense of the word, though sometimes let down by attention to detail, the pic deserves at the least to be adopted by horror fests." Carlos Aguilar from Los Angeles Times praised the film, stating that it "maintains a determined stance not to show more than needed to keep one guessing, even if the symbolic references it tries to make and the social statements it may be carrying are left inconclusive."

== See also ==
- The Crimes That Bind (2020 film)
