= Osmar Núñez =

Argentine film and theatre actor (born 1957)

Osmar Núñez (born 15 September 1957) is an Argentine film and theatre actor.

== Filmography ==
- El Milagro secreto (1998)
- Los Senderos (1999)
- Con palos y piedras (2000)
- Vivir Intentando (2003)
- Informe nocturno (2004)
- Un Año sin amor (2005) a.k.a. A Year Without Love
- Mientras tanto (2006)
- El Custodio (2006) a.k.a. The Minder
- El Cielo elegido (2006)
- Las Vidas posibles (2006)
- Encarnación (2007)
- El nido vacío (2008)
- The Invisible Eye (2010)
- It's Your Fault (2010)
- Brother and Sister (2010)
- Contra las Cuerdas (2010)
- The Corporation (2012)
- Wild Tales (2014)
- Betibú (2014)

== Awards ==
- Silver Condor Award for Best Actor (2015)
