= Restos =

2012 Mexican drama film directed by Alfonso Pineda Ulloa

- Directed by: Alfonso Pineda Ulloa
- Written by: Alfonso Pineda Ulloa; Blas Valdez; Ernesto Walker
- Starring: Leonardo Sbaraglia; Ilse Salas; Manolo Cardona
- Production companies: BN Films; Delicious Films; Itaca Films
- Release date: March 8, 2012
- Running time: 95 minutes
- Country: Mexico
- Language: Spanish

Restos is a 2012 film directed by Alfonso Pineda Ulloa, written by Alfonso Pineda Ulloa, Blas Valdez and Ernesto Walker and starring Leonardo Sbaraglia, Ilse Salas and Manolo Cardona.

== Cast ==
- Leonardo Sbaraglia as Daniel
- Ilse Salas as Elena
- Manolo Cardona as Luis
- Amorita Rasgado as Hotel Housekeeper
- Carolina Guerra
- Omar Ceballos as Snob gallery
- Xavier Sodi

== Release ==
Restos was released on March 8, 2012.
