= Alanis (film) =

2017 film by Anahí Berneri

- Theatrical release poster
- Directed by: Anahí Berneri
- Written by: Javier van de Couter; Anahí Berneri
- Produced by: Diego Dubcovsky; Anahí Berneri; Laura Huberman
- Starring: Sofía Gala Castiglione; Dante Della Paolera; Dana Basso; Silvina Sabater
- Cinematography: Luis Sens
- Edited by: Delfina Castagnino; Andrés Pepe Estrada
- Music by: Nahuel Berneri
- Production companies: Varsovia Films; Laura Cine; Rosaura Films
- Release dates: 9 September 2017 (Toronto); 21 September 2017 (Argentina)
- Running time: 82 minutes
- Country: Argentina
- Language: Spanish

Alanis is a 2017 Argentine drama film directed, co-written and co-produced by Anahí Berneri. It premiered in September 2017 at the Toronto International Film Festival as part of its Contemporary World Cinema programme. The film was also screened at the San Sebastián International Film Festival, where Berneri and Castiglione received the Silver Shell for Best Director and Best Actress respectively.

== Plot ==
It centers on a young woman of limited means who works as a sex worker and is forced to struggle to survive after police authorities falsely accuse her of “human trafficking” and take away her home. From there, the story recounts the hardships faced by a sex worker who is also a mother.

== Cast ==
- Sofía Gala Castiglione as Alanis
- Dante Della Paolera as Dante
- Dana Basso as Gisela
- Silvina Sabater as Andrea
- Carlos Vuletich as Román
- Estela Garelli as Social worker
- Santiago Pedrero as Santiago

== Reception ==
Alanis received positive reviews from film critics. The review aggregator Rotten Tomatoes gives the film an approval rating of 100% based on 12 reviews, with an average rating of 7.67/10. On Todas Las Críticas, which assigns a normalized rating based on Argentine reviews, the film has a weighted average score of 76 out of 100, based on 35 critics.
