= The Sleepwalkers (2019 film) =

2019 film

- Promotional release poster
- Directed by: Paula Hernández
- Written by: Paula Hernández
- Produced by: Juan Pablo Miller
- Starring: Érica Rivas
- Cinematography: Iván Gierasinchuk
- Edited by: Rosario Suárez
- Production company: Tarea Fina
- Distributed by: Meikincine Enterteintment
- Release dates: 6 September 2019 (TIFF); 21 November 2019 (Argentina)
- Running time: 117 minutes
- Countries: Argentina; Uruguay
- Language: Spanish

The Sleepwalkers (Spanish: Los sonámbulos) is a 2019 drama film written and directed by Paula Hernández. The film received the Silver Condor award for Best Film from the Argentine Film Critics Association in 2021. It was selected as the Argentine entry for the Best International Feature Film at the 93rd Academy Awards, but it was not nominated.

== Synopsis ==
Tensions arise in a family while they are on their summer holiday in Argentina.

== Cast ==
- Érica Rivas as Luisa
- Ornella D'Elía as Ana
- Marilú Marini as Memé
- Luis Ziembrowski as Emilio
- Daniel Hendler as Sergio

== Reception ==
On review aggregator website Rotten Tomatoes, the film holds an approval rating of 69% based on 13 reviews.

== See also ==
- List of submissions to the 93rd Academy Awards for Best International Feature Film
- List of Argentine submissions for the Academy Award for Best International Feature Film
