= Marilú Marini =

Argentine actress

Marilu Marini
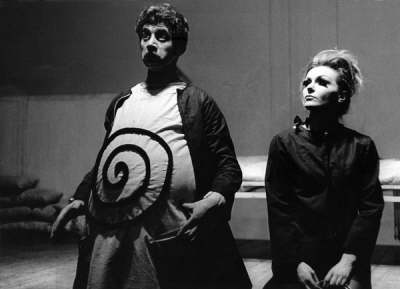
- With Jorge Fiszon, in 1968
- Born: 15 June 1940 (age 86); Buenos Aires, Argentina
- Occupation: Actress
- Years active: 1960–present

Marilú Marini (born 15 June 1940) is an Argentine actress. She frequently works with French filmmaker Claire Denis. She received the Diamond Konex Award in 2021 as the most important person in Entertainment in the last decade in Argentina.

== Selected filmography ==
- Violanta (1976)
- The Games of Countess Dolingen (1981)
- Les Nanas (1985), directed by Annick Lanoë
- Trouble Every Day (2001), directed by Claire Denis
- Musée haut, musée bas (2008), directed by Jean-Michel Ribes
- The Sleepwalkers (2019)
- 27 Nights (2025)

== Nominations ==
- 2013 Martín Fierro Awards
  - Best actress of miniseries
- 2026 Sur Award for Best Actress
