= Sebastián Borensztein =

Argentine filmmaker

- Born: 22 April 1963 (age 62); Buenos Aires, Argentina
- Other names: Sebastián Bores
- Occupations: Film director; writer
- Years active: 1991–present
- Notable work: Chinese Take-Away
- Spouse: Paula Siero (m. 1994; div. 1999)
- Parents: Tato Bores; Berta Szpindler
- Relatives: Alejandro Borensztein (brother); Marina Borensztein (sister)
- Website: www.sebastianbores.com

Sebastián Borensztein (born 22 April 1963) is an Argentine screenwriter and film director, best known for the films Chinese Take-Away (2011), Heroic Losers (2019) and the horror television miniseries El garante (1997).

== Early life and education ==
Sebastián Borensztein was born on 22 April 1963 in Buenos Aires, the son of comedian Tato Bores and Berta Szpindler.

He first studied Communication Sciences at the Universidad del Salvador, but after graduating decided to turn to the performing arts, and studied film directing at the Augusto Fernández school.

== Career ==
During the 1980s he worked in advertising, but under the guidance of his father, started screenwriting. He wrote, directed and also acted as producer for his father's work, for which he earned several awards.

=== Television ===
Borensztein started out by writing for television. His first series, a horror miniseries entitled El garante (1997, "The Guarantor") won many awards, including four Martín Fierro Awards, and was a finalist for the Emmy Awards.

He made the highly acclaimed series Tiempo final (2000–2002), later remade by Fox Telecolombia in 2007–9, also named Tiempo final.

=== Films ===
Borensztein's first feature film was La suerte está echada ("The die is cast"), in 2005, which won several international awards. In 2007, he partnered with American independent filmmaker Benjamin Odell, with whom he co-wrote his second film, Sin Memoria, released in Mexico in 2011.

His third film, released in 2011, was the highly successful Chinese Take-Away (Un Cuento Chino).

In 2019 Heroic Losers (La odisea de los giles) was released. It screened at the 2020 New Zealand International Film Festival in Auckland, as well as at the Toronto and San Sebastián Film Festivals.

== Recognition ==
- Ondas Award for best Spanish-language TV show, awarded by the Spanish SER network
- Konex Award (2000), one of the best five Argentine directors of the decade
- Martín Fierro Awards (several)
- December 2019: An "outstanding cultural personality" by the Honorable Deliberating Council of the City of Buenos Aires

== Personal life ==
Borensztein was married to actress Paula Siero from 1994 to 1999.

Filmmaker Alejandro Borensztein is his brother, and actress Marina Borensztein his sister.
