= The Intruder (2020 film) =

2020 film

- Promotional release poster
- Spanish: El prófugo
- Directed by: Natalia Meta
- Starring: Érica Rivas; Nahuel Pérez Biscayart; Daniel Hendler; Cecilia Roth; Guillermo Arengo; Agustín Rittano; Gabriela Pastor; Flor Dyszel; Mirta Busnelli
- Music by: Luciano Azzigotti
- Release dates: 21 February 2020 (Berlinale); 30 September 2021 (Argentina)
- Running time: 94 minutes
- Countries: Argentina; Mexico
- Language: Spanish

The Intruder (Spanish: El prófugo) is a 2020 psychological thriller film directed by Natalia Meta. The film is loosely based on the novel El mal menor by C. E. Feiling. It was selected to compete for the Golden Bear in the main competition section at the 70th Berlin International Film Festival. It was selected as the Argentine entry for the Best International Feature Film at the 94th Academy Awards.

== Plot ==
A voice actress faces an identity crisis, convinced her body is being overtaken by intruders from her dreams.

== Cast ==
- Cecilia Roth as Marta
- Nahuel Pérez Biscayart as Alberto
- Erica Rivas as Inés
- Daniel Hendler as Leopoldo
- Guillermo Arengo as Maestro

== See also ==
- List of submissions to the 94th Academy Awards for Best International Feature Film
- List of Argentine submissions for the Academy Award for Best International Feature Film
