= Anahí Berneri =

Argentinian film director and screenwriter

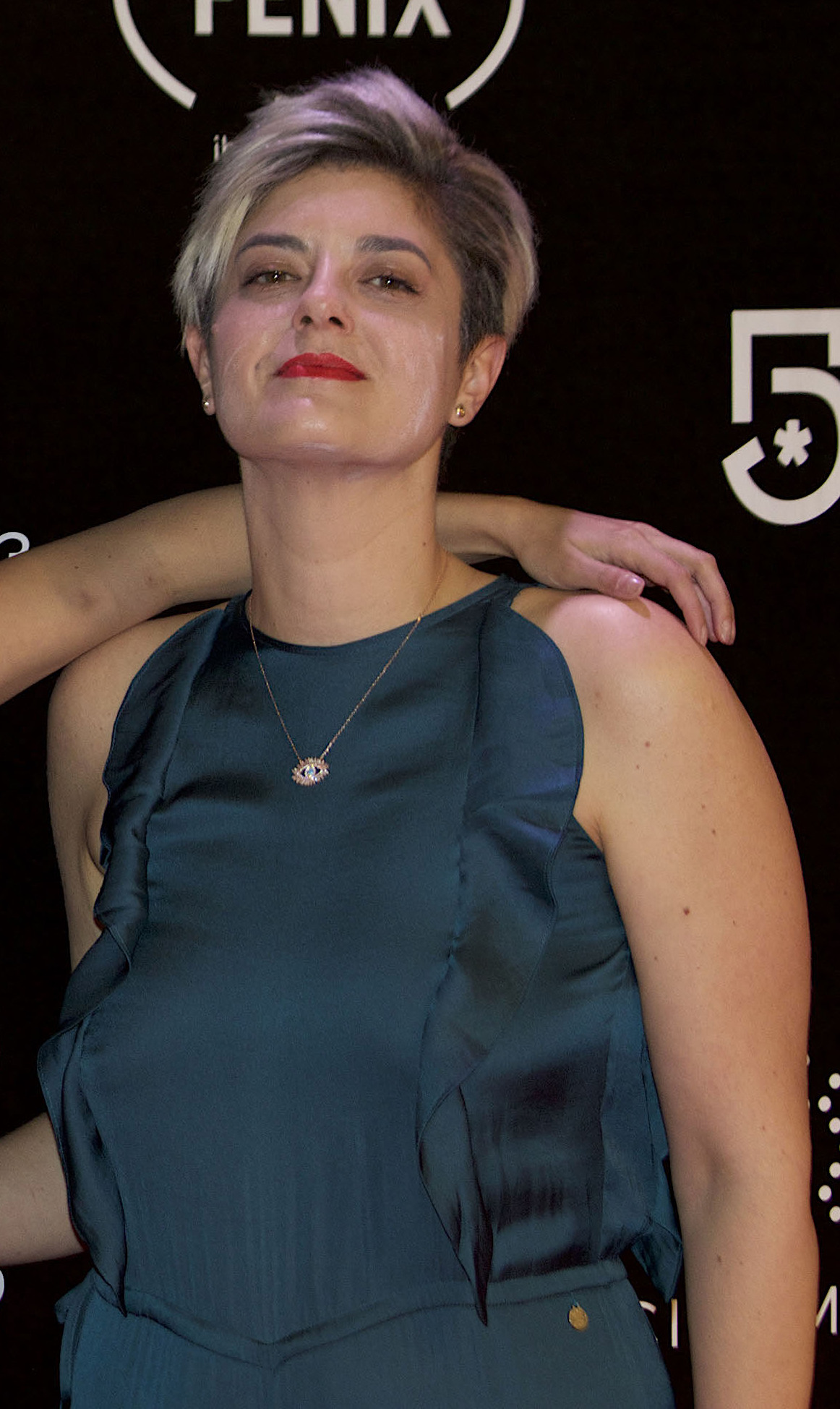
- Anahí Berneri en los premios Fénix de 2018
- Born: 1975 (age 50–51); San Isidro, Buenos Aires, Argentina
- Occupation: Director
- Years active: 1997–present

Anahí Berneri (born 1975) is an Argentine film director and screenwriter. Her films have been shown at various film festivals around the world.

== Selected filmography ==
Year	Title	Notes
2005	A Year Without Love	Teddy Award; Nominated – Mar del Plata International Film Festival – Best Film
2007	Encarnación	
2010	It's Your Fault	
2014	Aire libre	Nominated – Golden Shell
2017	Alanis	Grand Coral – First Prize; Silver Shell for Best Director; Nominated – Golden Shell
2023	Elena Knows	

== Awards ==
- Teddy Award (2005)
- Silver Shell for Best Director (2017)
