= Incident Light =

2015 film

- Film poster
- Directed by: Ariel Rotter
- Written by: Ariel Rotter
- Starring: Erica Rivas
- Production companies: Tarea Fina; Airecine; Urban Factory; SéAcuatico
- Distributed by: Distribution Company Sudamericana (Arg.); Urban Distribution (Fra.)
- Release dates: 16 September 2015 (TIFF); 1 September 2016 (Argentina)
- Running time: 95 minutes
- Countries: Argentina; Uruguay; France
- Language: Spanish

Incident Light (Spanish: La luz incidente) is a 2015 drama film directed by Ariel Rotter. It was screened in the Contemporary World Cinema section of the 2015 Toronto International Film Festival.

== Cast ==
- Érica Rivas
- Susana Pampin
- Marcelo Subiotto
