= Leonardo Sbaraglia =

Argentine actor (born 1970)

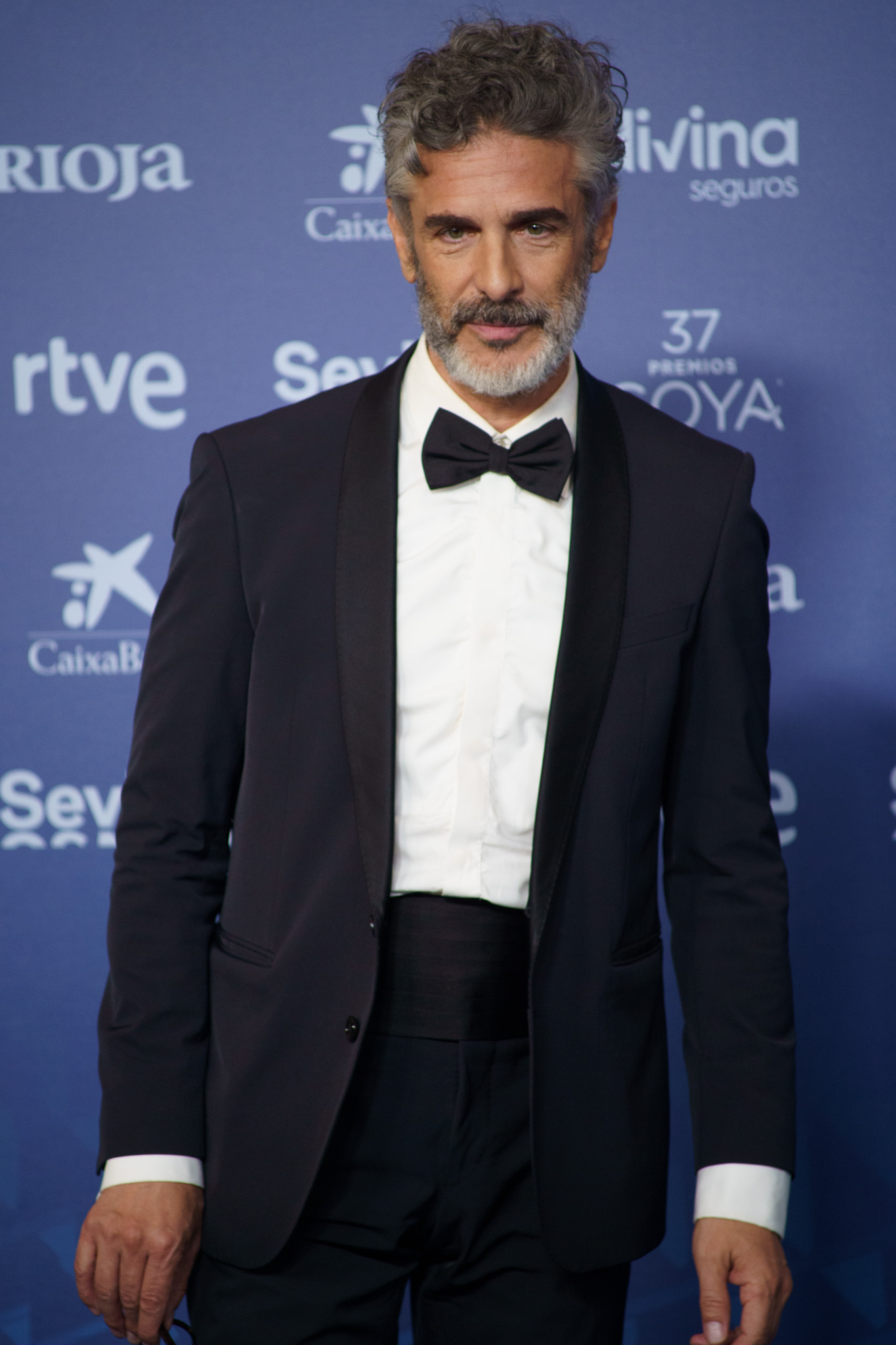
- Sbaraglia in 2023
- Born: Leonardo Máximo Sbaraglia; 30 June 1970 (age 56); Buenos Aires, Argentina
- Other name: Leo Sbaraglia
- Occupation: Actor
- Years active: 1986–present
- Spouse: Guadalupe Martínez

Leonardo Máximo Sbaraglia (Spanish: [leoˈnaɾðo (e)sβaˈɾa(ɣ)lja]; born 30 June 1970) is an Argentine actor with extensive credits in both Argentina and Spain. He has also worked in Mexico, notably in the Apple TV+ series Women in Blue, and was cast in his first English-language role in Red Lights.

== Biography ==
Sbaraglia was born and raised in Buenos Aires where his mother, Roxana Randon, is a local actress and theatre coach. He started his acting career at the age of 16 in La noche de los lápices, a political documentary drama directed by Héctor Olivera.

In 1987, he gained popularity among Argentine youth for his role in the TV series Clave de sol. In the following years, he starred in TV and film productions as well as in theatre (such as La Soledad de los Campos de Algodón, Closer). In 1993, he worked for the first time together with Argentine director Marcelo Piñeyro in Tango feroz: la leyenda de Tanguito. They came together again for Caballos salvajes (1995), for which Leonardo Sbaraglia earned the Jury Prize for Best Acting at the Huelva International Film Festival, and later for Cenizas del paraíso (1997) and an acclaimed performance in Plata quemada (2000).

Sbaraglia emigrated to Spain in 1998. He starred with Eusebio Poncela in Intacto, a 2001 thriller directed by Juan Carlos Fresnadillo, and received a Goya Award for Best New Actor. His other starring roles include Deseo (2002), a Gerardo Vera film in which he plays alongside Leonor Watling and Cecilia Roth, and Carmen (2003), an adaptation of Prosper Mérimée's classic by director Vicente Aranda.

Sbaraglia worked again in 2005 with director Antonio Hernández, with whom he had already shot En la ciudad sin límites in 2002. This and his contribution to Sebastián Borensztein's mini TV series Tiempo final (2000) after their production of El garante, for which he earned the Martín Fierro Award for best performance by an actor; Hernández and Piñeyro are the only directors with whom Sbaraglia has worked more than once.

He was nominated for the Goya Award for Best Supporting Actor in 2007 for his role as Jesús Irurre in the film Salvador (Puig Antich) in which he starred with German actor Daniel Brühl. The city of Huelva awarded Sbaraglia an honorary award in 2005.

Sbaraglia returned to Argentina in 2008, and starred in Marcelo Piñeyro's Las viudas de los jueves in a role nominated for an Argentine Film Critics Association Silver Condor Award. Among his notable later roles are alongside Robert De Niro and Sigourney Weaver in Rodrigo Cortés' Red Lights (2012); and as one of two men caught in a road duel in Damián Szifrón's acclaimed Wild Tales (2014).

Beginning in 2024, Sbaraglia has starred as Alejandro de la Torre in Women in Blue (Las Azules), a Spanish-language crime drama set in 1970s Mexico City and produced by Lemon Studios for Apple TV+, appearing opposite Bárbara Mori as the husband of her character. He returned for the show's second season, which premiered on 12 August 2026. In 2025 he starred as former Argentine president Carlos Menem in the Prime Video biographical miniseries Menem, for which he received a Platino Award nomination.

== Family ==
Sbaraglia married the Argentine sculptor Guadalupe Martín in 2001; the couple have one child.

== Filmography ==
=== Film ===
Key
†	Denotes films that have not yet been released

Title	Year	Role	Notes	Ref.
1986	Night of the Pencils	Daniel		
1993	Copyright			
1993	Tango feroz: la leyenda de Tanguito	Pedro		
1994	Fuego gris			
1995	Fotos del alma			
1995	No te mueras sin decirme adónde vas	Pablo		
1995	Caballos salvajes	Pedro		
1996	Carlos Monzón, el segundo juicio			
1996	Besos en la frente	Sebastián Miguez		
1997	Cenizas del paraíso	Pedro Makantasis		
1998	Bajamar			
1998	Vendado y frío			
2000	Plata quemada	El Nene		
2001	Intacto	Tomás		
2002	En la ciudad sin límites	Victor		
2002	Nowhere	Paolo Brandi		
2002	Deseo	Pablo		
2003	Utopía	Adrián		
2003	Carmen	José		
2003	Cleopatra	Carlos		
2004	La puta y la ballena	Emilio		
2005	La mitad negada			
2005	Oculto	Alex		
2006	Salvador (Puig Antich)	Jesús		
2006	De bares			
2007	Concursante	Martín Circo Martín		
2007	El rey de la montaña	Quim		
2008	Violanchelo	Dr. Marquez		
2008	Santos	Arturo Antares		
2008	Diario de una ninfómana	Jaime		
2009	Las viudas de los jueves	Ronnie		
2009	El corredor nocturno	Lopez		
2010	Sin retorno	Federico Samaniego		
2011	El campo	Santiago		
2011	Vaquero	Alonso		
2012	Red Lights	Leonardo Palladino		
2012	Restos	Daniel		
2014	Wild Tales	Diego Iturralde		
2014	Aire libre	Manuel		
2016	The Silence of the Sky	Mario		
2016	Al final del túnel	Joaquín		
2016	Sangre en la boca	Ramón Alvia		
2017	Nieve negra	Marcos		
2017	El otro hermano (The Lost Brother)	Duarte		
2018	El desentierro (The Uncovering)	Pau		
2019	Dolor y gloria	Federico		
2019	Wasp Network			
2020	Unknown Origins	Paco		
2021	Errante corazón (Wandering Heart)	Santiago		
2021	Alegría	Simón		
2023	Blondi	Eduardo		
2023	Puan	Rafael Sujarchuk		
2024	El hombre que amaba a los platos voladores (The Man Who Loved UFOs)	José de Zer		
2026	Amarga Navidad (Bitter Christmas)	Raúl		
2026	Karma	Daniel		

=== Television ===
Year	Title	Role	Ref.
1987	Clave de sol		
1990	Atreverse		
1991	Amores		
1991	El gordo y el flaco		
1991	Alta comedia		
1993	Cartas de amor en cassette		
1996	De poeta y de loco		
1997	El garante		
1998	Casablanca		
1998	Bajamar, la costa del silencio		
1999	La argentina de tato		
2000	Tiempo final		
2005	Al filo de la ley		
2009	Epitafios		
2009	Impostores		
2010	Lo que el tiempo nos dejó		
2012–2014	En terapia		
2013	Dos lunas		
2018	Félix	Félix	
2022	Todos mienten		
2023–2024	Elite		
2024–present	Women in Blue (Las Azules)	Alejandro de la Torre	
2025	Menem	Carlos Menem	

== Awards ==
Year	Award	Category	Work	Result	Ref.
2001	49th Silver Condor Awards	Best Actor	Burnt Money	Nominated	
2002	16th Goya Awards	Best New Actor	Intact	Won	
2004	52nd Silver Condor Awards	Best Actor	In the City Without Limits	Nominated	
2007	21st Goya Awards	Best Supporting Actor	Salvador	Nominated	
2009	4th Sur Awards	Best Actor	The Widows of Thursdays	Nominated	
2010	58th Silver Condor Awards	Best Actor	The Widows of Thursdays	Nominated	
2010	38th International Emmy Awards	Best Actor	Epitafios	Nominated	
2010	5th Sur Awards	Best Actor	No Return	Nominated	
2014	9th Sur Awards	Best Actor	Wild Tales	Nominated	
2015	63rd Silver Condor Awards	Best Actor	Aire libre	Nominated	
2015	2nd Platino Awards	Best Actor	Wild Tales	Nominated	
2017	11th Sur Awards	Best Actor	At the End of the Tunnel	Nominated	
2018	66th Silver Condor Awards	Best Actor	The Lost Brother	Won	
2018	12th Sur Awards	Best Actor	The Lost Brother	Nominated	
2020	7th Feroz Awards	Best Supporting Actor in a Film	Pain and Glory	Nominated	
2020	34th Goya Awards	Best Supporting Actor	Pain and Glory	Nominated	
2020	29th Actors and Actresses Union Awards	Best Film Actor in a Minor Role	Pain and Glory	Won	
2022	16th Sur Awards	Best Actor	Wandering Heart	Won	
2022	70th Silver Condor Awards	Best Actor	Wandering Heart	Won	
2024	11th Platino Awards	Best Supporting Actor	Puan	Nominated	
2024	18th Sur Awards	Best Supporting Actor	Puan	Won	
2025	19th Sur Awards	Best Actor	The Man Who Loved UFOs	Nominated	
2026	13th Platino Awards	Best Actor in a Miniseries or TV Series	Menem	Nominated	

Martín Fierro Awards

Year	Category	Film	Award
1997	Best Actor in a Drama Series	El garante	Winner
1997	Best Supporting Actor	En terapia	Winner
