= Natalia Kohen =

Argentine artist and writer

Natalia Kohen (1919–2022) was an Argentine artist and writer. She was born in Mendoza and studied in Buenos Aires.

Over a very long career, she held numerous solo and group exhibitions. She was also a writer of note, publishing around a dozen books of poetry and fiction.

Winner of many prizes, she was named as an Outstanding Cultural Personality of Buenos Aires by the city's legislature in 2009.

She died in 2022, aged 103.
