= Encarnación (film) =

- Screenshot
- Directed by: Anahí Berneri
- Written by: Anahí Berneri, Mariana Dolores Espeja
- Produced by: Daniel Burman, Diego Dubcovsky
- Starring: Silvia Pérez, Martina Juncadella
- Cinematography: Diego Poleri
- Edited by: Alejandro Parysow
- Music by: Nico Cota
- Release date: 11 October 2007
- Running time: 93 minutes
- Country: Argentina
- Language: Spanish

Encarnación is a 2007 Argentine film directed and written by Anahí Berneri. It premiered on 11 October 2007. The film was produced by Daniel Burman and Diego Dubcovsky. Silvia Pérez was nominated for Best Actress and Best New Actress at the Argentine Film Critics Association Awards in 2008. The film won the best innovation award at the Toronto International Film Festival.

== Cast ==
- Silvia Pérez as Erni
- Martina Juncadella as Ana
- Carlos Portaluppi as Osmar Núñez
- Marcelo Aguilar as Winery Owner
- Fabián Arenillas
- Luciano Cáceres
- Osmar Núñez
- Inés Saavedra
