= Paulina (film) =

2015 film

- Theatrical release poster
- Directed by: Santiago Mitre
- Written by: Santiago Mitre
- Starring: Dolores Fonzi
- Release dates: 15 May 2015 (Cannes); 18 June 2015 (Argentina)
- Running time: 103 minutes
- Countries: Argentina; Brazil; France
- Language: Spanish

Paulina (Spanish: La patota) is a 2015 thriller film directed by Santiago Mitre. It was screened in the Critics' Week section at the 2015 Cannes Film Festival where it won the Nespresso Grand Prize and the FIPRESCI Prize. It is inspired by the 1960 film La patota.

== Cast ==
- Dolores Fonzi as Paulina
- Oscar Martínez as Fernando
- Esteban Lamothe as Alberto

== Awards and accolades ==
Aside from winning the Critics' Week and FIPRESCI prizes at Cannes, Paulina won some awards at other festivals including San Sebastián and the Havana Film Festival New York. Dolores Fonzi won the prize for best actress at the 2015 Premio Iberoamericano de Cine Fénix, and also at the 2015 Argentine Academy of Cinematography Arts and Sciences Awards.
