= Marcelo Subiotto =

Argentine actor (born 1967)

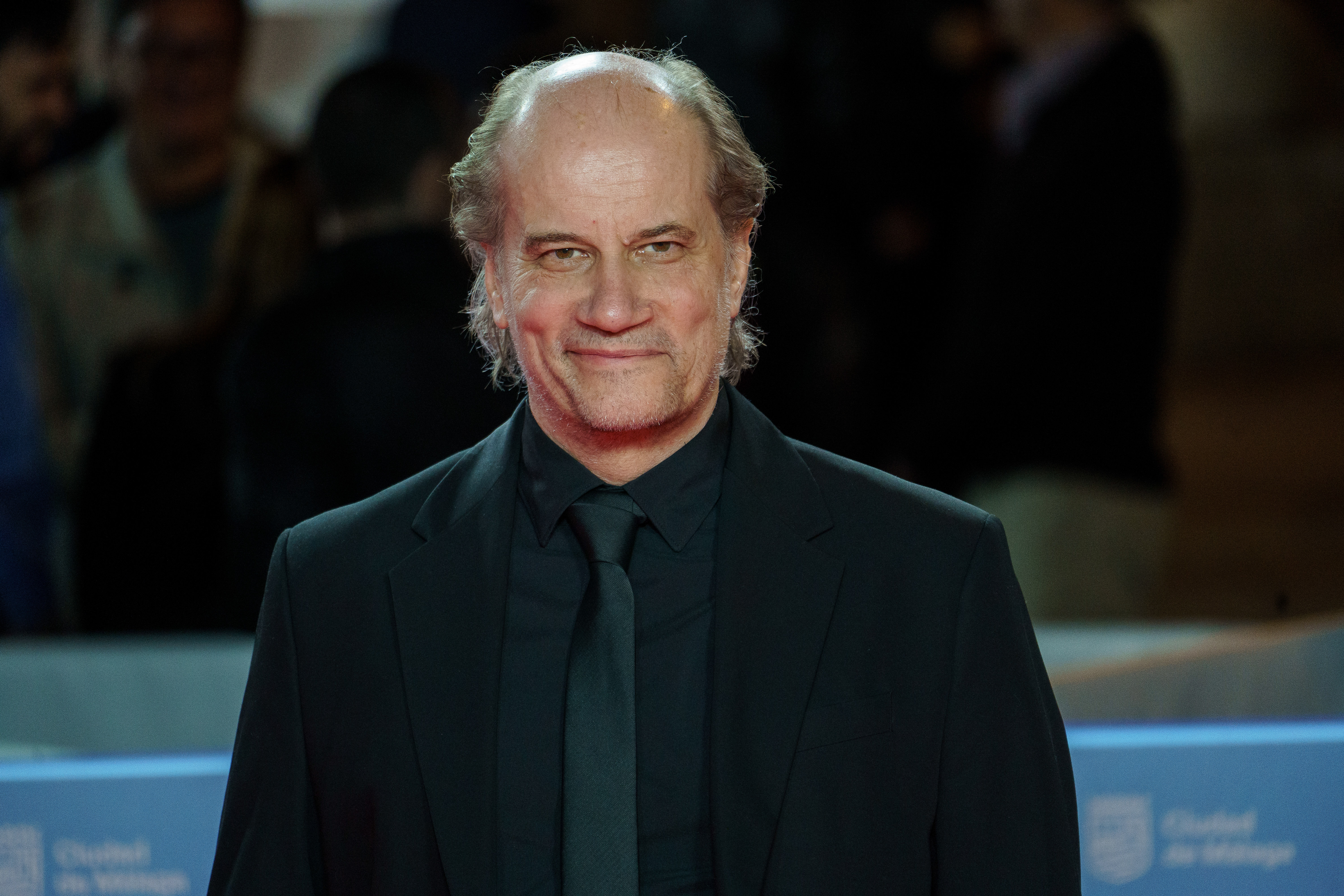
- Subiotto in 2025
- Born: 1967 (age 58–59); Buenos Aires, Argentina
- Occupation: Actor

Marcelo Subiotto (born 1967) is an Argentine actor who developed his early career primarily on stage. He has also ventured into film and television.

== Life and career ==
Marcelo Subiotto was born in Buenos Aires in 1967. He is of Italian and Croatian descent. Prior to acting he was a volleyball player. His theatre credits include Mujeres soñaron caballos, Espía a una mujer que se mata, Los hijos se han dormido, and En lo alto para siempre. He also managed the theatre Puerta Roja in tandem with Adrián Canale.

His portrayal of Ernesto in drama film Incident Light (2015) won him the Sur Award for Best New Actor. He later featured in Animal.

In 2019 he made film appearances in El bosque de los perros, Delfín, Hojas verdes de otoño, La afinadora de árboles, La deuda, and Ciegos. In 2023, he won the Best Actor Award at the 27th Lima Film Festival for his work in The Barbarians and the Silver Shell for Best Leading Performance at the 71st San Sebastián International Film Festival for his work in Puan. He also featured in television series División Palermo.

In 2025, he acted in The Message (El mensaje), a film directed by Iván Fund, which was selected in competition of 75th Berlin International Film Festival and will have its world premiere in February 2025. He also featured in television series The Eternaut (El eternauta), and co-starred in the black comedy film Dogs (Perros).

In 2026 he appeared in the film Glaxo.
