= 27 Nights =

2025 Argentine film

- Release poster
- Spanish: 27 noches
- Directed by: Daniel Hendler
- Screenplay by: Daniel Hendler; Martín Mauregui; Agustina Liendo
- Based on: Veintisiete noches by Natalia Zito
- Produced by: Agustina Llambi Campbell; Santiago Mitre
- Starring: Marilú Marini; Daniel Hendler
- Cinematography: Julián Apezteguia
- Edited by: Nicolás Goldbart
- Music by: Pedro Osuna
- Production company: La Unión de los Ríos
- Distributed by: Netflix
- Release dates: 19 September 2025 (Zinemaldia); 17 October 2025 (Netflix)
- Running time: 107 minutes
- Country: Argentina
- Language: Spanish

27 Nights (Spanish: 27 noches) is a 2025 Argentine drama film directed by Daniel Hendler. The film scripted by Daniel Hendler, Martín Mauregui, and Agustina Liendo on first adaptation by Mariano Llinás is based on 2021 biographical fiction novel Veintisiete noches by Argentine author Natalia Zito. The film, starring Marilú Marini, explores the themes of aging and freedom through the story of an elderly woman admitted to a psychiatric clinic by her daughters.

It had its world premiere as part of the opening of the 73rd San Sebastián International Film Festival, and competed for the Golden Shell in the 'In competition' section on 19 September 2025. It has been streaming globally on Netflix since 17 October 2025.

== Cast ==
- Marilú Marini as Martha Hoffman
- Daniel Hendler
- Humberto Tortonese
- Julieta Zylberberg
- Paula Grinszpan
- Carla Peterson

== Production ==
The film is based on the true story of an Argentine artist and writer Natalia Kohen, who was erroneously diagnosed with Pick's disease at the age of 88 and subsequently committed to a psychiatric clinic against her will. A later judicial proceeding determined that Kohen was in good health, leading to her release.

The film is directed by Uruguayian actor and director Daniel Hendler, who co-stars with Marilú Marini, and features Carla Peterson and Julieta Zylberberg.

== Release ==
27 Nights opened the 73rd San Sebastián International Film Festival on 19 September 2025, where it competed for Golden Shell.

== Accolades ==
Award	Date of ceremony	Category	Recipient(s)	Result	Ref.
San Sebastián International Film Festival	27 September 2025	Golden Shell for Best Film	27 Nights	Nominated	
