= It's Your Fault (film) =

- Film poster
- Spanish: Por tu culpa
- Directed by: Anahí Berneri
- Starring: Érica Rivas; Nicasio Galán
- Release date: 14 February 2010 (Berlin)
- Running time: 87 minutes
- Country: Argentina
- Language: Spanish

It's Your Fault (Spanish: Por tu culpa) is a 2010 Argentine drama film directed by Anahí Berneri.

== Cast ==
- Érica Rivas as Julieta
- Nicasio Galán as Teo
- Zenón Galán as Valentín
- Rubén Viani as Guillermo
- Marta Bianchi- Abuela
- Osmar Núñez as Doctor
