= Fernando Galmarini =

Fernando Nicolás Galmarini (San Fernando, December 20, 1942), popularly known as "Pato" Galmarini, is an Argentine politician who served as National Secretary of Sports during the presidency of Carlos Menem, as well as a national deputy, among other political positions.

Alongside his political activities, he worked as a sports journalist and played football in the minor leagues. In 1989, while serving as Secretary of Sports, he played a friendly match for Boca Juniors.

== Biography ==
A native of San Fernando, Galmarini began his activism under the guidance of Father Carlos Mugica around 1965 to1966. Shortly thereafter, between 1967 and 1968, and during the Onganía dictatorship, he joined the Peronist group Descamisados. In 1973, at the age of thirty, he was elected provincial deputy, his first political office.

He served as Minister of Government under Eduardo Duhalde, the Governor of Buenos Aires Province. In 1995, he was elected to the National Chamber of Deputies for the first time, representing Buenos Aires Province, a position he held until 1999.
