= The Message (2025 film) =

2025 Argentine-Spanish film

- Festival release poster
- Spanish: El mensaje
- Directed by: Iván Fund
- Written by: Iván Fund; Martín Felipe Castagnet
- Produced by: Laura Mara Tablón; Gustavo Schiaffino
- Starring: Mara Bestelli; Marcelo Subiotto; Anika Bootz; Betania Cappato
- Cinematography: Gustavo Schiaffino
- Edited by: Iván Fund
- Music by: Mauro Mourelos
- Production companies: Rita Cine; Insomnia Films; Animista Cine
- Distributed by: BTeam Pictures (Spain)
- Release dates: 18 February 2025 (Berlinale); 24 July 2026 (Spain)
- Running time: 90 minutes
- Countries: Argentina; Spain
- Language: Spanish

The Message (Spanish: El mensaje) is a 2025 drama road movie written and directed by Iván Fund. The film is about opportunistic guardians living in rural Argentina, who exploit a child's unique ability by offering animal medium consultation for profit.

The Argentine-Spanish co-production film had its world premiere at the main competition of the 75th Berlin International Film Festival, on 18 February 2025, where it won the Silver Bear Jury Prize.

== Synopsis ==
Amid an economic downturn, a 9-year-old girl who can communicate with animals and her profit-driven guardians work as pet mediums, traveling through the Argentine countryside in a motorhome to visit the girl's mother in a mental institution. This heartfelt road film explores family communication struggles, the tension between innocence and opportunism, and the blurred line between truth and deception in their supernatural business. Regardless of its authenticity, their service ensures no one feels alone, highlighting the value of connection.

== Cast ==
- Mara Bestelli
- Marcelo Subiotto
- Anika Bootz
- Betania Cappato

== Production ==
In August 2024, San Sebastián Film Festival selected the film as its Work-in-Progress Latam project.

== Release ==
The Message had its world premiere on 18 February 2025, as part of the 75th Berlin International Film Festival, in Competition.

Paris-based Luxbox acquired the sales rights of the film in January 2025.

The film was screened in Global Vision at the 49th Hong Kong International Film Festival on 12 April 2025.

The film was presented in the Latin Horizons section at the 73rd San Sebastián International Film Festival on 21 September 2025. On 3 October 2025, it was presented in Panorama section of 2025 Vancouver International Film Festival.

It was screened in Open Zone section of the 2025 Stockholm International Film Festival on 5 November 2025. It will be presented in 'From The Festivals - 2025' section of the 56th International Film Festival of India in November 2025.

Distributed by BTeam Pictures, it was released theatrically in Spain on 24 July 2026.

== Reception ==
On the review aggregator website Rotten Tomatoes, 88% of 17 critics' reviews are positive, with an average rating of 7.3/10.

Elsa Fernández-Santos of El País lauded how the film "flows between images that say more than meets the eye, without judging its characters".

Manuel J. Lombardo of Diario de Sevilla gave the film a 3-star rating, declaring it, above all, to be a film "about the need to believe, to forgive, and to forgive oneself as the driving forces behind a certain kind of hope".

== Accolades ==
Award	Date of ceremony	Category	Recipient	Result	Ref.
Berlin International Film Festival	23 February 2025	Golden Bear	The Message	Nominated	
Berlin International Film Festival	23 February 2025	Silver Bear Jury Prize	The Message	Won	
