= Sofía Gala =

Argentine actress

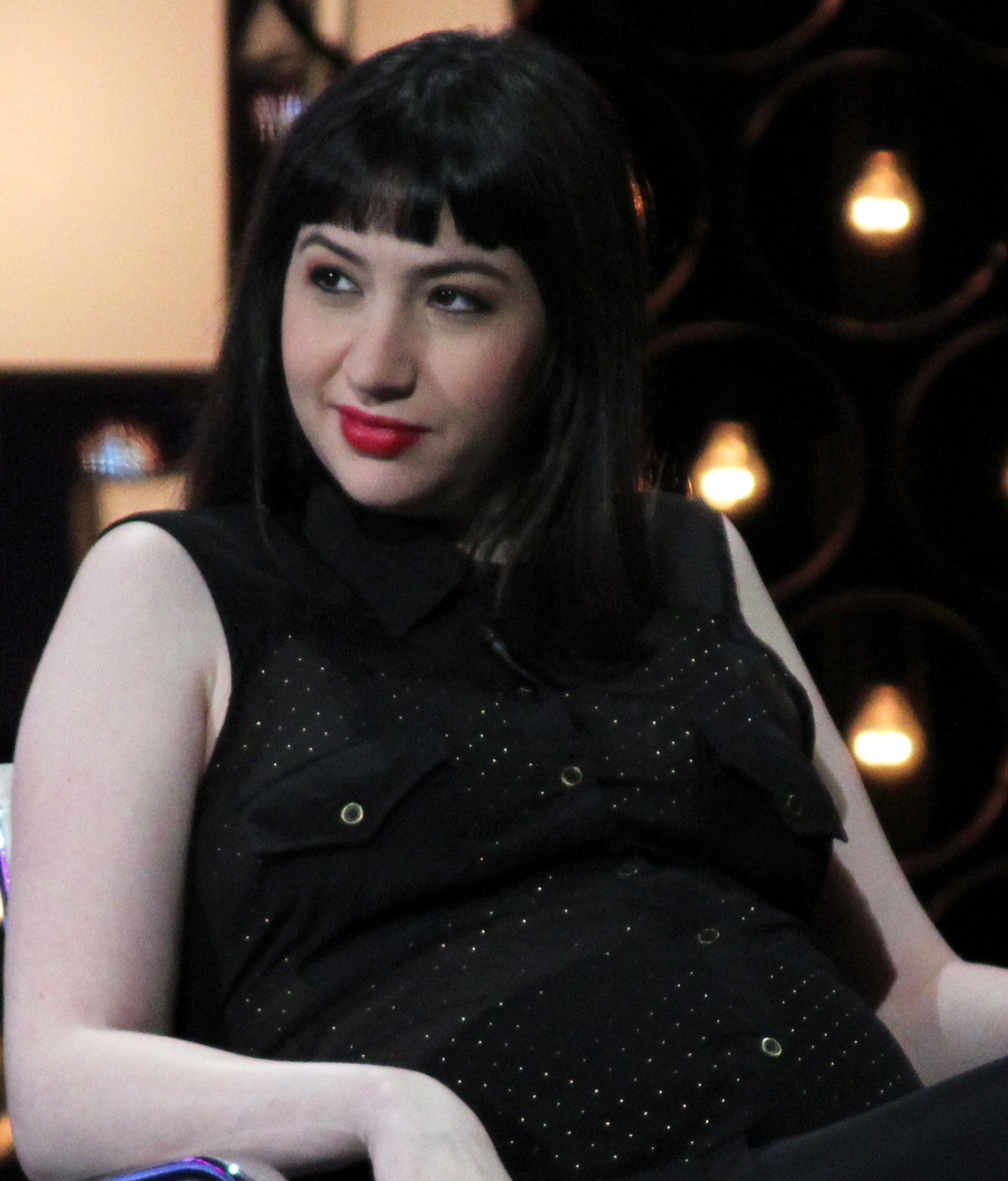
- Sofía Gala in 2014
- Born: Sofía Gala Castiglione; 24 January 1987 (age 39); Buenos Aires, Argentina
- Occupation: Actress
- Years active: 1995–present
- Spouse: Julián Della Paolera (m. 2012; div. 2018)
- Partner: Diego Tuñón (2004–2010)
- Children: 2
- Mother: Moria Casán

Sofía Gala Castiglione Casanova (born 24 January 1987) better known by her stage name Sofía Gala, is an Argentine actress.

Daughter of the actress Moria Casán and producer Mario Castiglione, Sofía Gala grew up in the dressing rooms of revues, during the filming of Alberto Olmedo and Jorge Porcel's films, and in the backstage gossip television shows. As a teenager, she generated controversy by posing nude with her mother at age 13, and dating a 38-year-old man when she was 15.

Her acting debut came with Los Roldán, in 2004 at age 17. In 2007, she starred in the movie El resultado del amor, a role that earned her a Silver Condor Award and the distinction of 'best actress' in the Festival de Cine Iberoamericano de Huelva.

== Filmography ==
Film
Year	Title	Role	Notes
2007	The Effect of Love	Mabel	Silver Condor Award for Best New Actress; Festival de Cine Iberoamericano de Huelva Award for Best Actress; Nominated—Clarín Award for Best Actress
2008	La Ronda	Lucía	
2008	Rodney	Lucía	
2009	Piedras	Livia	
2009	Paco	Belén	
2010	Tetro	María Luisa	Film by Francis Ford Coppola
2010	El Sol	La Checo (voice)	
2012	Everybody Has a Plan	Rosa	
2017	Alanis	Alanis	Silver Condor Award for Best Actress; Havana Film Festival Award for Best Actress; San Sebastián International Film Festival: Silver Shell for Best Actress
2019	Lava	Debora	
2024	Underground Orange	Paty	Film by Michael Taylor Jackson

== Television ==
Television
Year	Title	Role	Notes
1995	Moria Banana		Participation in sketches
1996	Atorrantes	Reporter	
2000	Intratables	Reporter	
2004	Los Roldán	Sofía Estévez	Acting debut
2006	El tiempo no para	Anita	
2008	Mujeres Asesinas	Gabriela	Episode: "Nina, desconfiada"
2010	Lo que el tiempo nos dejó	Nina	Episode: "La ley primera"
2011	Historias de la primera vez	Luján	Episode: "La primera vez que fui padre"
2012	El donante		Episode: "Más problemas para Bruno"
2012	Historia clínica		Episode: "Ernesto "Che" Guevara: Tantas veces me mataron, tantas veces me morí"
2012	23 pares	Ana Orozco	13 episodes
2026	Moria	young Moria	8 episodes
