= Iván Fund =

Argentine director

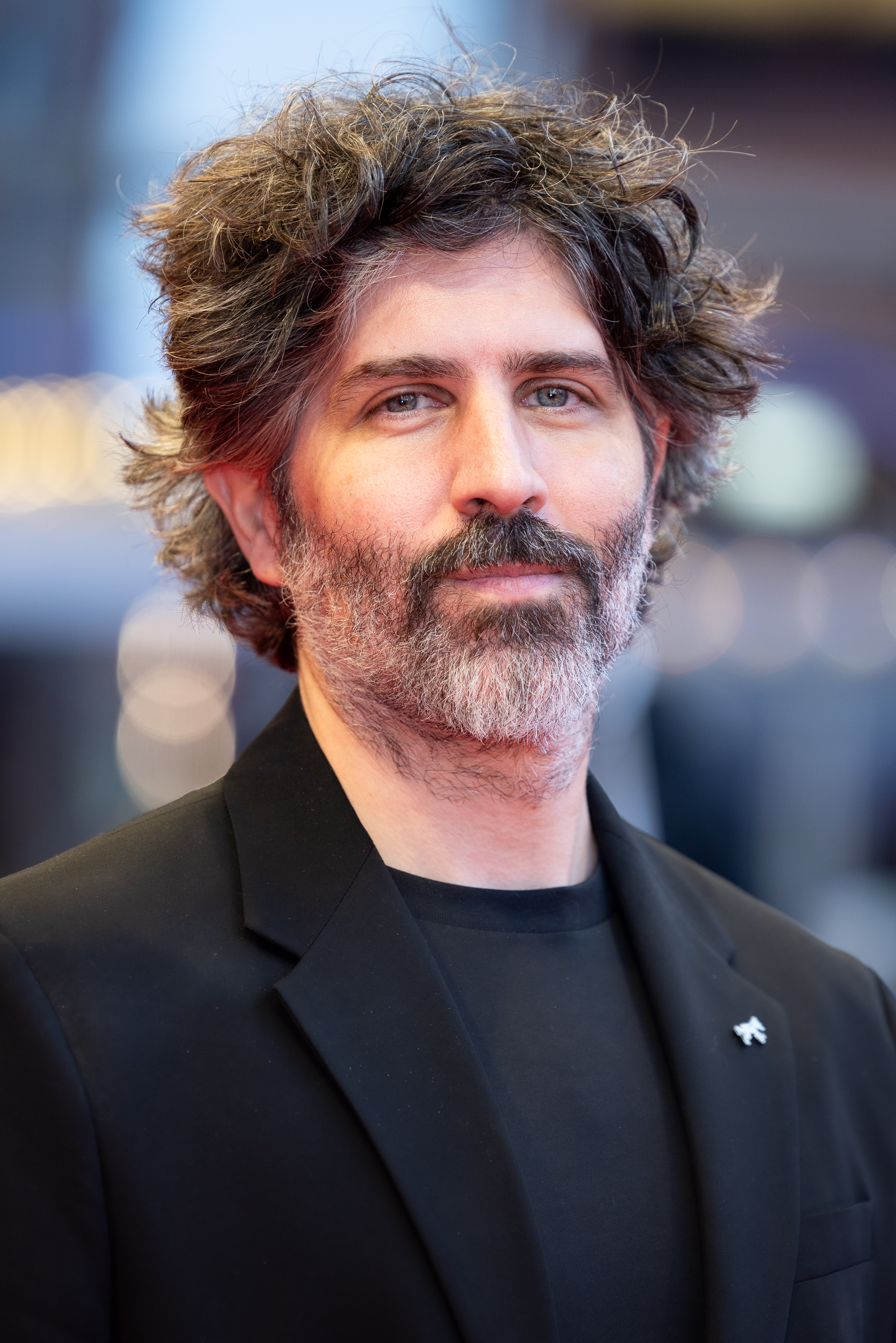
- Iván Fund in 2025
- Born: San Cristóbal, Santa Fe, Argentina
- Occupation: Director

Iván Fund was born in San Cristóbal, Santa Fe, Argentina, in 1984.

He grew up in Crespo, Entre Ríos, where he graduated from high school. In 2002, he moved to Buenos Aires and worked as a cinematographer. In 2005 he directed his first short film, Vals, which was honored with a special mention from the Jury at the Mar del Plata International Film Festival. In 2006 he directed the short films Sirenas and El Baile, and received, among other awards, a Georges Meliés Short Film Prize, awarded by Alliance Française. In 2007, he directed the short films Divergir and Un Punto Fijo, as well as the short feature Cicope, which he directed in collaboration with Patricio Toscano and which was a BAFICI Official Selection. In 2008, he began collaborating with Santiago Loza. In 2009, his first feature film, La Risa, was a BAFICI Official Selection.

His film Los Labios won the Cannes Film Festival Un Certain Regard Award for Best Actress in 2010.

In 2025, he directed The Message, a Spanish film, which was selected in competition of 75th Berlin International Film Festival and had its world premiere in February 2025.
