= In the Open (2011 film) =

2011 Spanish drama film directed by Hernán Belón

- Spanish: El campo
- Directed by: Hernán Belón
- Written by: Hernán Belón; Valeria Radivo
- Starring: Leonardo Sbaraglia; Dolores Fonzi; Matilda Manzano
- Production companies: Bastiana Films; Skydancers; Istituto Luce Cinecittà
- Release dates: September 2011 (Reykjavík); May 3, 2012
- Running time: 85 minutes
- Countries: Argentina; Italy; France
- Language: Spanish

In the Open (Spanish: El campo) is a 2011 drama film directed by Hernán Belón, written by Hernán Belón and Valeria Radivo and starring Leonardo Sbaraglia, Dolores Fonzi and Matilda Manzano.

The film premiered at the 2011 Reykjavík International Film Festival. In the Open was released on May 3, 2012.

== Cast ==
- Leonardo Sbaraglia as Santiago
- Dolores Fonzi as Elisa
- Matilda Manzano as Matilda
- Pochi Ducasse as Odelsia (as Pochi Ducase)
- Juan Villegas as Alberto
- Javier Volá as Playero
- Rodolfo Benegas as Mozo (as Rodolfo Raúl Benegas)
