= The Woman in the Line =

2025 Spanish drama film

- Theatrical release poster
- Directed by: Benjamín Ávila
- Screenplay by: Benjamín Ávila; Marcelo Müller
- Produced by: Tomás Eloy Muñoz Lázaro; Valeria Bistagnino; Esteban Mentasti; Horacio Mentasti; Mariana Volpi
- Starring: Natalia Oreiro; Amparo Noguera; Alberto Ammann; Federico Heinrich
- Cinematography: Sergio Armstrong
- Production companies: Mostra Cine; Buffalo Films; Diving Media
- Distributed by: Moving Pics
- Release dates: 4 September 2025 (Argentina); 11 September 2025 (Uruguay)
- Running time: 105 minutes
- Countries: Argentina; Spain
- Language: Spanish

The Woman in the Line (Spanish: La mujer de la fila) is a 2025 drama film co-written and directed by Benjamín Ávila. It follows a mother’s personal quest to uncover the reasons behind her son’s arrest. The film stars Natalia Oreiro, Amparo Noguera, Alberto Ammann, and Federico Heinrich. It premiered in Argentina on 4 September 2025.

== Plot ==
The film tells the story of Andrea, a middle-class woman living in Buenos Aires whose life is upended by her son’s unexpected arrest. She discovers the realities faced by those with relatives in prison — bureaucratic hurdles, social prejudice, and the routines of visitation. There, she meets other “women in the line”, who, after initial coldness, become her emotional support network.

== Cast ==
- Natalia Oreiro as Andrea Casamento
- Amparo Noguera as La Veintidós
- Alberto Ammann as Alejo
- Federico Heinrich as Gustavo
- Marcela Acuña as Coca
- Lide Uranga as Alicia
- Mora Recalde as Clara
- Iride Mockert as Guadalupe
- Natalia Santiago as Marisa
- Jade Ramírez
- Verónika Silva
- Benjamín Ávila as Santillán
- Luis Campos as Emilio

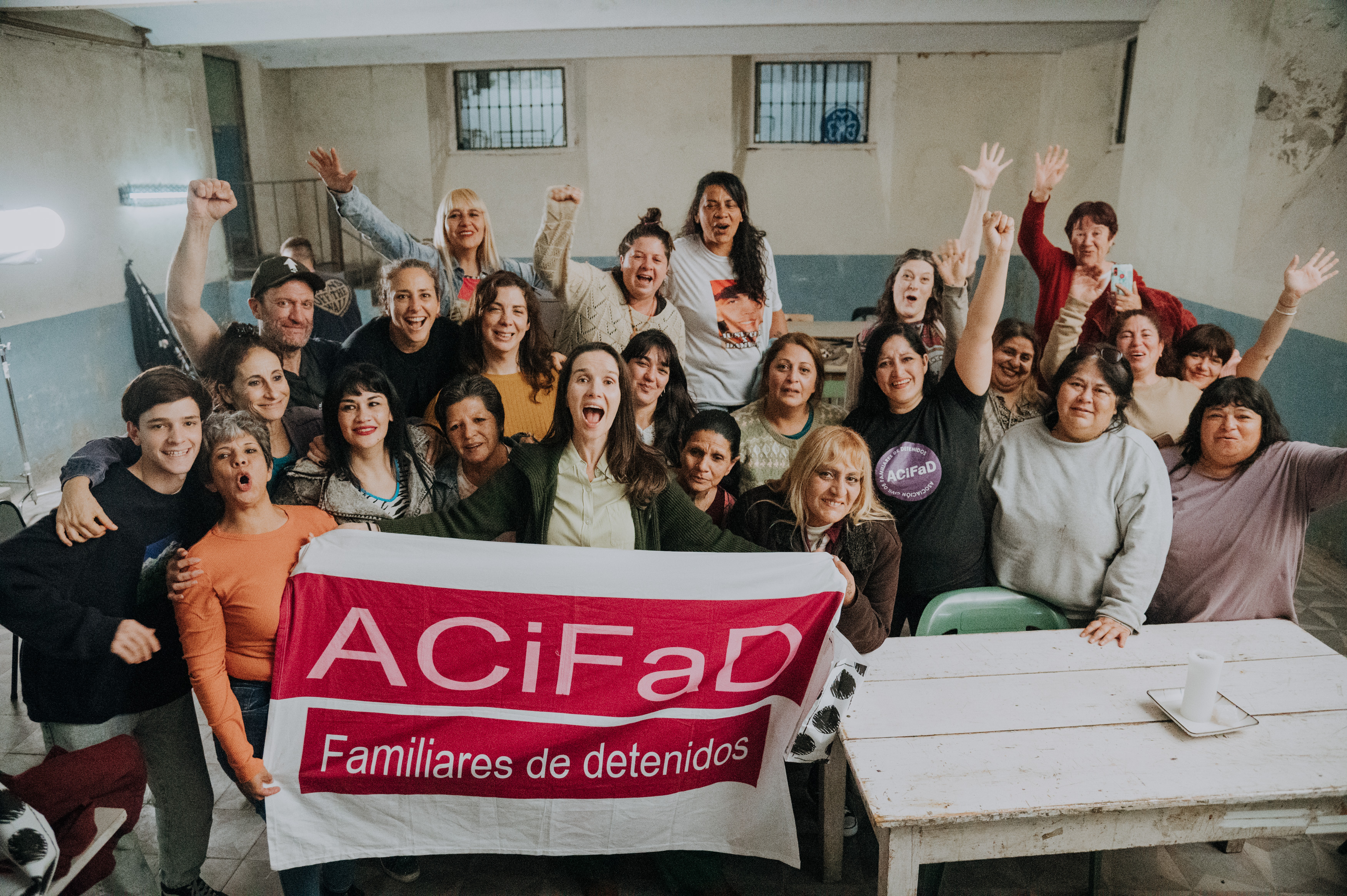
The film also features members of the Asociación Civil de Familiares de Detenidos

The film also features members of the Asociación Civil de Familiares de Detenidos (ACiFaD – Civil Association of Relatives of Detainees), founded in 2008 by Andrea Casamento.

== Production ==
The Woman in the Line is an Argentine–Spanish co-production by Mostra Cine and Buffalo Films (Argentina) and Diving Media (Spain). The film received support from ACiFaD, the United Nations Development Programme (UNDP), the National Committee for the Prevention of Torture (CNPT), the Office of the Federal Prison Ombudsman (PPN), and the Argentine Association for the Execution of Penal Justice (AAJEP).

The project was also supported by the Government of Buenos Aires City through its 2019 and 2023 patronage programmes and the second edition of BA International Productions.

=== Development ===
The film was reportedly inspired by a 2017 TEDx talk given by Andrea Casamento at TEDxRíodelaPlata. In 2018, the project received support from the National Institute of Cinema and Audiovisual Arts (INCAA) after being selected as a winner in the Federal Feature Film Development Contest "Raymundo Gleyzer". It was later chosen to participate in the 22nd Málaga Film Festival’s industry section (MAFIZ) in 2019.

=== Filming ===
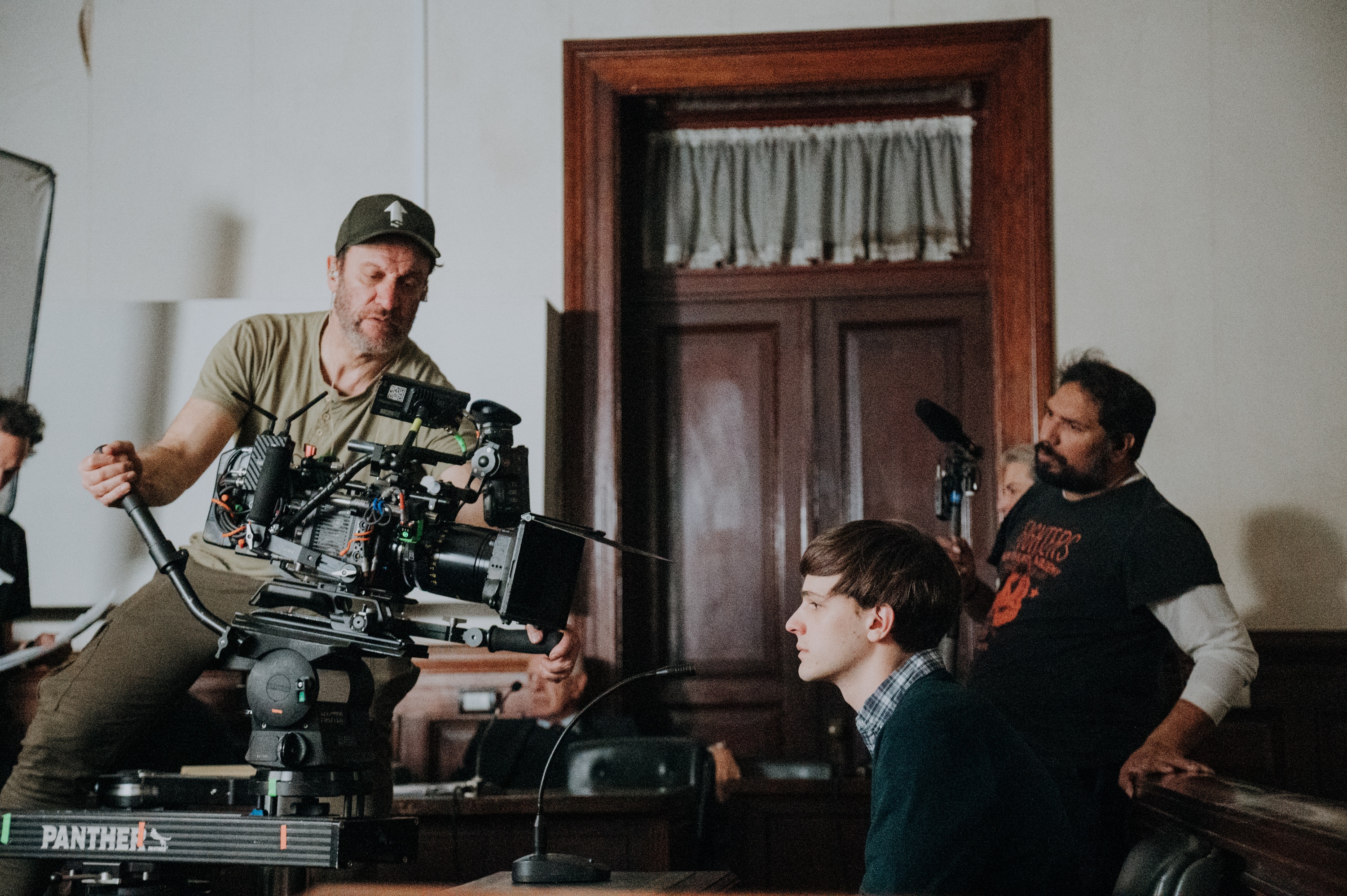
Benjamin Avila (director) and Federico Heinrich (actor) on the set of The Woman in the Line

Filming took place in May and June 2024, partly at the Federal Penitentiary Complex I of Ezeiza, the first feature film ever shot there.

=== Soundtrack ===
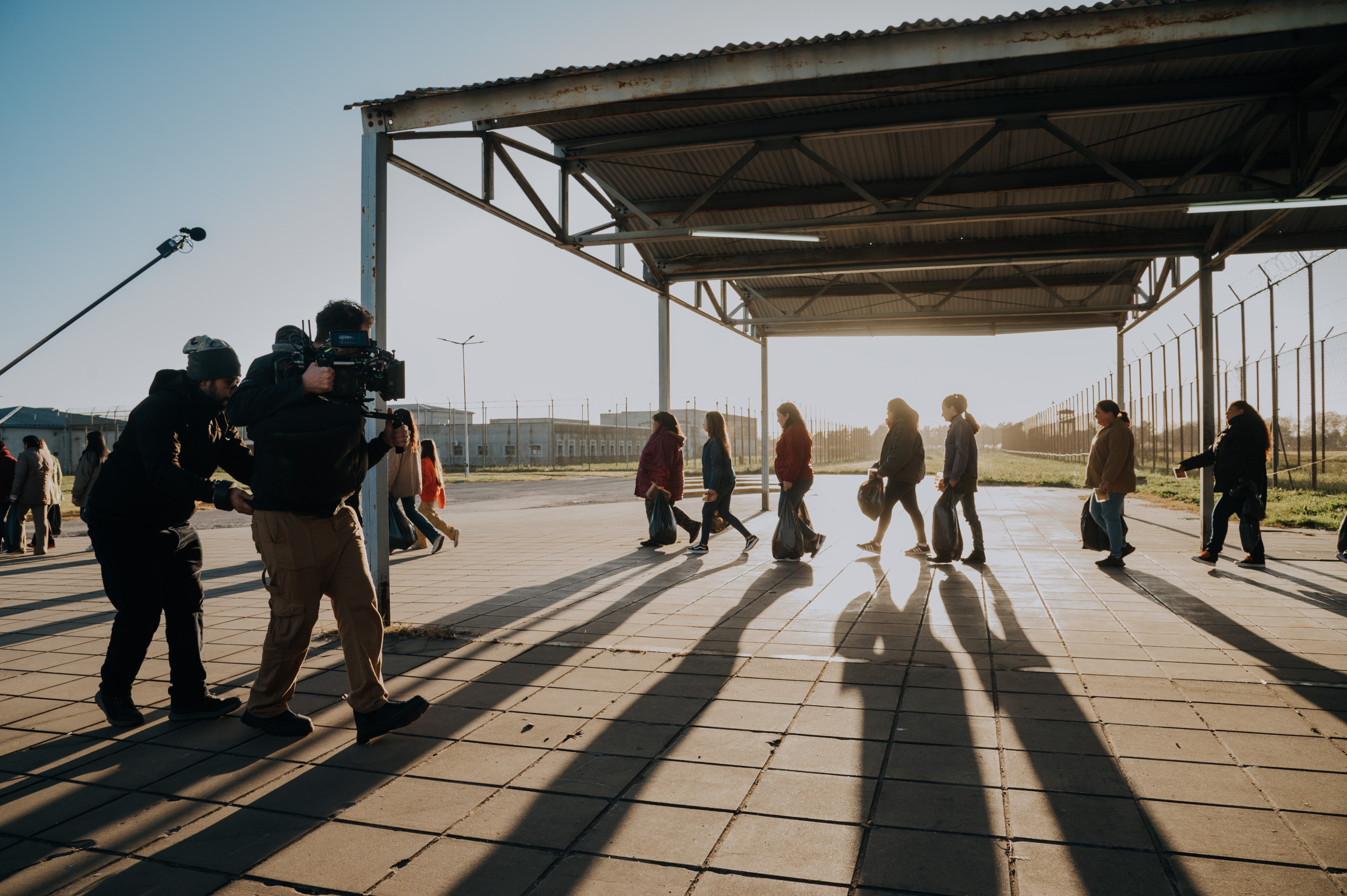
Filming of The Woman in the Line at Ezeiza Prison

The closing scene features a rendition of “Canción de las simples cosas” by César Isella and Armando Tejada Gómez, performed by Natalia Oreiro and her husband Ricardo Mollo. Oreiro suggested the song to the director, as it was one she often listened to while travelling to set.

=== Distribution ===
The film was distributed theatrically in Argentina by Moving Pics and internationally by FilmSharks. Following its cinema release, the film will stream on Netflix.

== Reception ==
The production and release of the film received coverage from both national and international media. Pablo Díaz, survivor of the Night of the Pencils, wrote about the film:

I remembered being in prison, in Unit 9 of La Plata, how her visits every Sunday affected me. I never thought what she went through to see me — the searches, the waiting — or her pain after leaving. The Woman in the Line was my mother waiting to see me, and me waiting to see her.

— Pablo Díaz

=== Social impact campaign ===
The film’s release will be accompanied by a social impact campaign aimed at encouraging viewers to reflect and inspire change regarding the realities portrayed in the film.

=== Marcos de Paz Programme ===
Preliminary cuts of the film were screened as part of the Marcos de Paz Programme, which organises film screenings in detention facilities and scriptwriting workshops in prisons such as Devoto Prison.
