= Aire libre =

2014 film

- Film poster
- Directed by: Anahí Berneri
- Written by: Anahí Berneri; Javier van de Couter
- Starring: Leonardo Sbaraglia
- Release date: 22 May 2014
- Running time: 102 minutes
- Country: Argentina
- Language: Spanish

Aire libre is a 2014 Argentine drama film directed by Anahí Berneri. It has been selected to be screened in the Contemporary World Cinema section at the 2014 Toronto International Film Festival.

== Synopsis ==
It is about the story of a married couple with a son whose relationship has begun to decay. In order to rebuild their relationship, they decide to start a project on the outskirts of the city. They sell their house and go to live at Lucia's parents' house. But the pressures are many and could end up separating them.

== Cast ==
- Leonardo Sbaraglia
- Celeste Cid
- Anahi Beholi
