= List of Argentine films of 2023 =

A list of Argentine-produced and co-produced feature films released in Argentina in 2023. When applicable, the domestic theatrical release date is favoured.

== Films ==
Release		Title (Domestic title)	Cast & Crew	Distribution	Ref.
J A N U A R Y	19	El método Tangalanga	Director: Mateo Bendesky Cast: Martín Piroyansky, Julieta Zylberberg, Alan Sabbagh, Rafael Ferro, Luis Machín, Luis Rubio, Lucía Maciel, Antonella Saldicco, Silvio Soldán	Star Distribution	
F E B R U A R Y	10	Trenque Lauquen	Director: Laura Citarella Cast: Laura Paredes, Ezequiel Pierri, Rafael Spregelburd, Elisa Carricajo, Verónica Llinás	—N/a	
M A R C H	16	1976	Director: Manuela Martelli Cast: Aline Kuppenheim, Nicolás Sepúlveda, Hugo Medina	3C Films	(Note: Argentina-Chile co-production)
M A R C H	23	Asfixiados	Director: Luciano Podcaminsky Cast: Julieta Díaz, Leonardo Sbaraglia, Marco Antonio Caponi, Zoe Hochbaum	Star Distribution	
A P R I L	6	The Extortion (La extorsión)	Director: Martino Zaidelis Cast: Guillermo Francella, Pablo Rago, Andrea Frigerio, Guillermo Arengo, Carlos Portaluppi, Alberto Ajaka, Mónica Villa	Warner Bros. Pictures	
A P R I L	20	Let the Dance Begin (Empieza el baile)	Director: Marina Seresesky Cast: Darío Grandinetti, Mercedes Morán, Jorge Marrale, Pastora Vega, Agostina Pozzi, Lautaro Zera, Marcelo Xicarts, Carolina Sobisch	Star Distribution	(Note: Argentina-Spain co-production)
M A Y	18	Lost & Found (Objetos)	Director: Jorge Dorado Cast: Álvaro Morte, China Suárez, Verónica Echegui, Daniel Aráoz, Selva Alemán, Andy Gorostiaga, Maitane San Nicolás	Star Distribution	(Note: Argentina-Spain-Germany co-production)
J U N E	1	Blondi	Director: Dolores Fonzi Cast: Dolores Fonzi, Carla Peterson, Toto Rovito, Rita Cortese, Leonardo Sbaraglia	Digicine	
J U N E	29	Los terrenos	Director: Verónica Chen Cast: Azul Fernández, César Troncoso, Victoria Orellana Muñoz, León Chen	—N/a	(Note: Argentina-Uruguay-Brazil co-production)
J U L Y	6	Casi muerta	Director: Fernán Mirás Cast: Natalia Oreiro, Diego Velázquez, Paola Barrientos, Ariel Staltari, Violeta Urtizberea, Alberto Ajaka, Vivian El Jaber, Filippo Carrozza	UIP	(Note: Argentina-Uruguay co-production)
A U G U S T	17	The Uruguayan (La uruguaya)	Director: Ana García Blaya Cast: Sebastián Arzeno, Fiorella Bottaioli, Jazmín Stuart, Gustavo Garzón	Star Distribution	(Note: Argentina-Uruguay co-production)
S E P T E M B E R	21	Women on the Edge (No me rompan)	Director: Azul Lombardía Cast: Julieta Díaz, Carla Peterson	BF Distribution	(Note: Argentina-Uruguay-Peru co-production)
O C T O B E R	5	Puan	Director: María Alché, Benjamín Naishtat Cast: Marcelo Subiotto, Leonardo Sbaraglia, Mara Bestelli, Julieta Zylberberg, Alejandra Flechner, Andrea Frigerio, Cristina Banegas	Digicine	(Note: Argentina-Italy-Germany-France-Brazil co-production)
O C T O B E R	12	El duelo	Director: Augusto Tejada Cast: María Eugenia Suárez, Joaquín Furriel, Juan Ignacio Cane, Maxi de la Cruz, Diego de Gregorio, Domingo Milesi, Cristina Inverrizzi, Diego Olazabal, Nacha Valverde	Star Distribution	
O C T O B E R	19	Norma	Director: Santiago Giralt Cast: Mercedes Morán, Alejandro Awada, Marco Antonio Caponi, Mercedes Scápola	Digicine	
O C T O B E R	26	The Delinquents (Los delincuentes)	Director: Rodrigo Moreno Cast: Daniel Elías, Esteban Bigliardi, Margarita Molfino, Germán De Silva, Laura Paredes, Mariana Chaud, Cecilia Rainero, Javier Zoro Sutton, Adriana Aizenberg	Maco Cine	(Note: Argentina-Luxembourg-Brazil-Chile co-production)
O C T O B E R	26	The Rescue: The Weight of the World (El rapto)	Director: Daniela Goggi Cast: Rodrigo de la Serna, Julieta Zylberberg, Andrea Garrote, Jorge Marrale, Germán Palacios	Paramount+	(Note: Argentina-United States co-production)
N O V E M B E R	2	Reina animal	Director: Moroco Colman Cast: Sofía Gala Castiglione, Chang Hung Cheng, Fernando Listello, Cristina Medina, Matías Jalil	Cinetren	
N O V E M B E R	9	When Evil Lurks (Cuando acecha la maldad)	Director: Demián Rugna Cast: Ezequiel Rodríguez, Demián Salomón, Silvina Sabater, Virginia Garófalo, Luis Ziembrowski, Emilio Vodanovich, Marcelo Michinaux, Paula Rubinsztein, Desiré Salgueiro	BF+Paris Films	
N O V E M B E R	24	Elena sabe	Director: Anahí Berneri Cast: Mercedes Morán, Érica Rivas	Netflix	
D E C E M B E R	7	Ven a mi casa esta Navidad	Director: Sabrina Campos Cast: Leonora Balcarce, Manuel Callau, Marita Ballesteros, Claudia Cantero, Mara Bestelli, Gabriel Fernández, Bárbara Massó, Guido Losantos, Isabela Terán, Valentín Wein, Alicia Labraga	Batata Films	

== Box office ==
The ten most watched Argentine films in 2023, by in-year admissions, were as follows:

Most watched films of 2023
Rank	Title	Admissions
1	Muchachos, la película de la gente	843,300
2	The Extortion (La extorsión)	528,762
3	Elijo creer	491,629
4	When Evil Lurks (Cuando acecha la maldad)	259,229
5	Casi muerta	146,878
6	Puan	119,281
7	Women on the Edge (No me rompan)	90,992
8	Blondi	64,983
9	Asfixiados	55,746
10	Argentina, 1985 ‡	53,404
‡: 2022 theatrical opening

== See also ==
- 18th Sur Awards
