= 18th Sur Awards =

Argentine film awards

- Date: 26 August 2024
- Site: Teatro Politeama, Buenos Aires, Argentina
- Hosted by: Dalia Gutmann
- Organized by: Argentine Academy of Cinematography Arts and Sciences

Highlights
- Best Film: When Evil Lurks
- Best Direction: Demián Rugna; When Evil Lurks
- Best Actor: Marcelo Subiotto; Puan
- Best Actress: Dolores Fonzi; Blondi (4)
- Most awards: Blondi (4)
- Most nominations: Blondi (13)

Television coverage
- Network: TNT, Max

The 18th Sur Awards ceremony, presented by the Argentine Academy of Cinematography Arts and Sciences, was held at the Teatro Politeama in Buenos Aires on 26 August 2024. The gala was hosted by Dalia Gutmann, and it was broadcast on TNT and Max.

== Nominations and winners ==
The winners and nominees are listed as follows:

Best Film: When Evil Lurks; Blondi; The Delinquents; Puan	Best Debut Film: Blondi; Adentro mío estoy bailando; Errante. La conquista del hogar; Ven a mi casa esta Navidad
Best Director: Demián Rugna — When Evil Lurks; María Alché, Benjamín Naishtat — Puan; Dolores Fonzi — Blondi; Rodrigo Moreno — The Delinquents	Best Documentary Film: El juicio; Adentro mío estoy bailando; Muchachos, la película de la gente; El villano
Best Original Screenplay: Rodrigo Moreno — The Delinquents; María Alché, Benjamín Naishtat — Puan; Laura Citarella, Laura Paredes — Trenque Lauquen; Dolores Fonzi, Laura Paredes — Blondi	Best Adapted Screenplay: Daniela Goggi, Andrea Garrote — The Rescue: The Weight of the World; Anahí Berneri, Gabriela Larralde — Elena Knows; Vera Fogwill — Conversations on Hatred; Pedro Mairal, Ana García Blaya, Christian Basilis, Josefina Licitra, Melania Stucchi, Juan Games, Marcos Krivocapich — The Uruguayan
Best Actress: Dolores Fonzi — Blondi; Mercedes Morán — Elena Knows; Laura Paredes — Trenque Lauquen; Julieta Zylberberg — The Rescue: The Weight of the World	Best Actor: Marcelo Subiotto — Puan; Rodrigo de la Serna — The Rescue: The Weight of the World; Ezequiel Rodríguez — When Evil Lurks; Toto Rovito — Blondi
Best Supporting Actress: Rita Cortese — Blondi; Virginia Garófalo — When Evil Lurks; Andrea Garrote — The Rescue: The Weight of the World; Carla Peterson — Blondi	Best Supporting Actor: Leonardo Sbaraglia — Puan; Ezequiel Díaz — Las fiestas; Germán Palacios — The Rescue: The Weight of the World; Pablo Rago — The Extortion
Best New Actress: Mariana Chaud — The Delinquents; Maitina De Marco — Las fiestas; Zoe Gotusso — Mariquita; Camila Peralta — Puan	Best New Actor: Toto Rovito — Blondi; Ezequiel Díaz — Las fiestas; Marcelo Michinaux — When Evil Lurks; Ezequiel Pierri — Trenque Lauquen
Best Cinematography: Inés Duacastella, Alejo Maglio — The Delinquents; Javier Julia — Blondi; Guillermo Nieto — Un pájaro azul; Daniel Ortega — Casi muerta	Best Costume Design: Pheonia Veloz — When Evil Lurks; Paula Kasakoff, Greta Ure — Blondi; Julieta López — Bill 79; Mariana Seropian — Ven a mi casa esta Navidad
Best Art Direction: Sebastián Orgambide — The Rescue: The Weight of the World; Aili Chen — Un pájaro azul; Micaela Saiegh — Blondi; Angela Torti, Micaela Urrutia — Tres hermanos	Best Original Score: Santiago Dolan — Puan; Pablo Borghi — The Extortion; Víctor Heredia — Quiero volverme tiempo; Bruno Masino, Agustín Toscano — En vos confío
Best Makeup and Characterization: Emmanuel Miño — Elena Knows; Angela Garacija, Malvina Mariani — Blondi; Néstor Burgos — Ven a mi casa esta Navidad; Karina Camporino, Matías Giachino, María Angeles Vázquez — Casi muerta	Best Editing: Alberto Ponce — El juicio; Lionel Cornistein — When Evil Lurks; Ariel Frajnd — The Extortion; Inti Nieto, Luz López Mañe y Santiago Parysow — Muchachos, la película de la gente
Best Sound: Leandro de Loredo — The Rescue: The Weight of the World; Gonzalo Matijas, Rubén Piputto, Matías Vilaro — The Extortion; Gustavo Pomerianec, Fernando Galucci, Adrián Rodríguez — En vos confío; Javier Stavropulos — Quiero volverme tiempo	Best Fiction Series: División Palermo; Barrabrava; Yosi, the Regretful Spy; El amor después del amor
