= 11th Platino Awards =

Ibero-American film awards ceremony for 2023

- Date: 20 April 2024
- Site: Gran Tlachco Theater, Riviera Maya, Mexico
- Hosted by: Esmeralda Pimentel; Majida Issa

Highlights
- Best Film: Society of the Snow
- Honorary Award: Cecilia Roth
- Best Actor: Enzo Vogrincic; Society of the Snow
- Best Actress: Laia Costa; Un amor
- Most awards: Film: Society of the Snow (6); Television: La mesías (2)
- Most nominations: Film: Society of the Snow (7); Television: Yosi, the Regretful Spy and División Palermo (4)

Television coverage
- Network: TNT; RTVE Play; La 2; Max

The 11th Platino Awards, presented by the Entidad de Gestión de Derechos de los Productores Audiovisuales (EGEDA) and the Federación Iberoamericana de Productores Cinematográficos y Audiovisuales (FIPCA), took place at Gran Tlachco Theater in Riviera Maya, Mexico, to recognize excellence in Ibero-American film and television of 2023.

The ceremony was hosted by Mexican actress Esmeralda Pimentel and Colombian actress Majida Issa. It was broadcast on TNT and Max for Latin America and RTVE Play and La 2 for Spain.

== Background ==
In October 2023, the Xcaret Park in Riviera Maya was announced as the venue for the 2024 edition of the awards, to be celebrated on 20 April 2024. It is the third time the ceremony took place in said venue as well as the first time in three years that the ceremony is not held in Spain.

The pre-selection of candidates was disclosed in January 2024 at Madrid's Casa de América. The shortlist of 20 candidates per category was read on 22 February 2024 by Ana Layevska, Blanca Guerra, Diego Calva, Eréndira Ybarra, Erik Hayser, and Sandra Echeverría during an event organised by Mexico's Cineteca Nacional. In March 2024, actress Cecilia Roth was announced as the recipient of the Honorary Platino Award in recognition of her "outstanding" career in the film industry.

The nominations were announced on 14 March 2024. In the film categories, drama film Society of the Snow led the nominations with seven, followed by Close Your Eyes and El conde, both with six. In the television categories, the series Yosi, the Regretful Spy and División Palermo both led the nominations with four, followed by Los mil días de Allende, 30 Coins and Love After Music, all with three each. Singers and musicians Ana Guerra, Ana Mena, Ángela Aguilar, David Bisbal, Diana Hoyos, Gerónimo Rauch, Majida Issa, Mariaca Semprún and Monsieur Periné, all performed at the ceremony.

Spanish film Society of the Snow received the most awards with five wins out of six nominations, including Best Ibero-American Film, Best Director and Best Actor. Other films with multiple wins were 20,000 Species of Bees with four and Robot Dreams with two. In the television categories, the Spanish series La mesías was the only series with multiple wins with two. Mentions to the plight of Argentine cinema condemning policy changes by the new Argentine administration were present in the ceremony.

== Award categories ==
The nominees are listed as follows:

=== Film ===
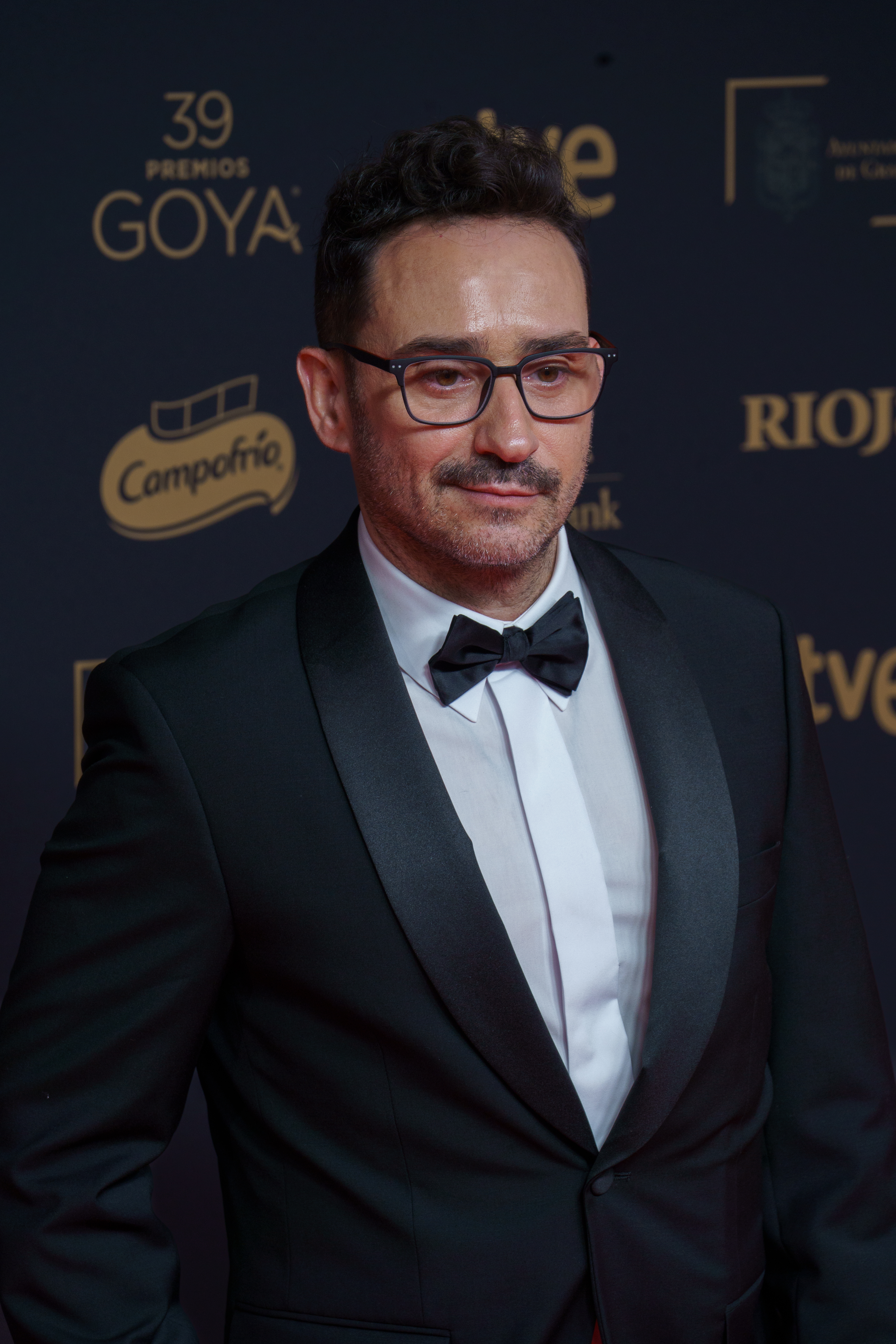
J. A. Bayona, Best Director winner.

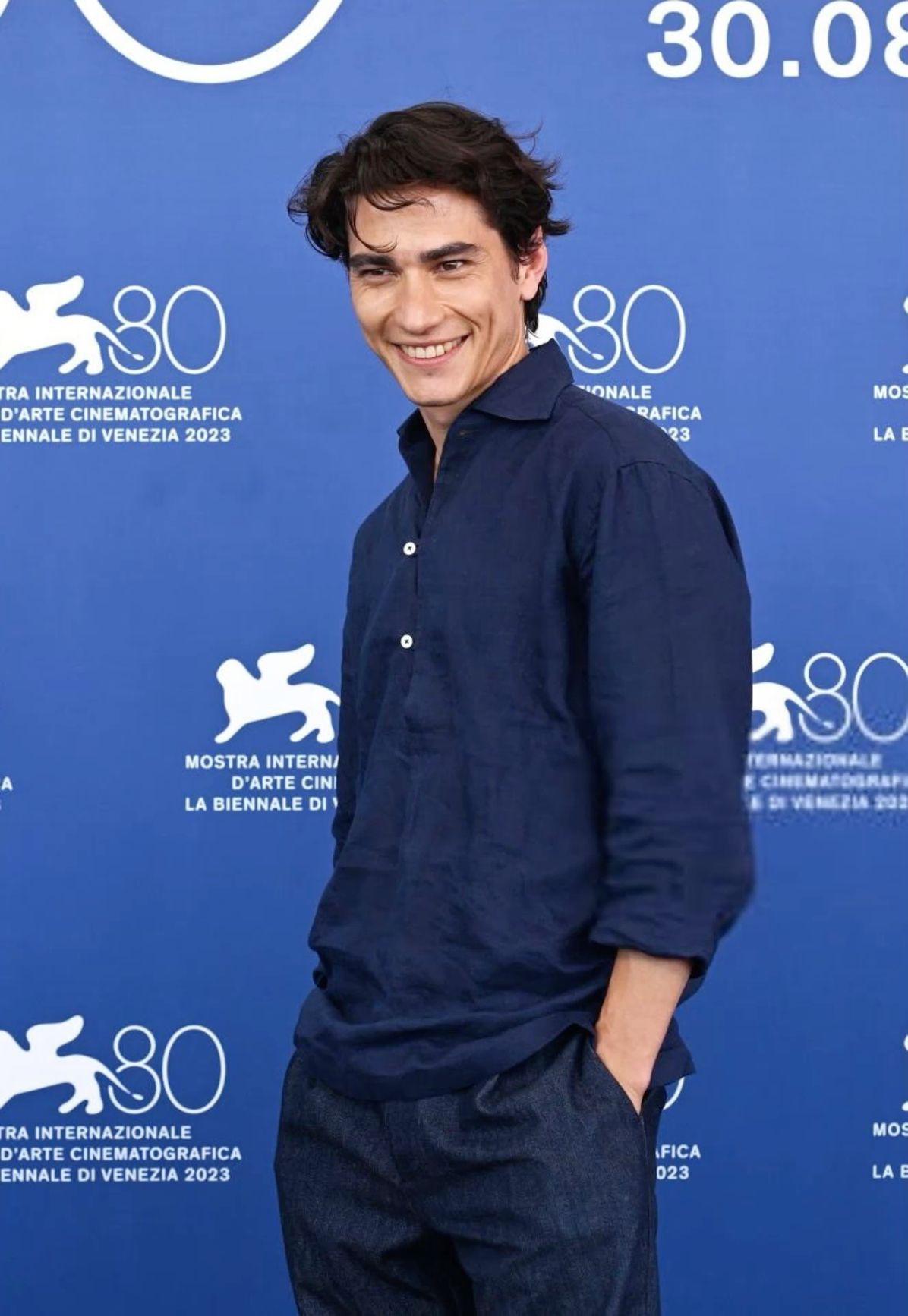
Enzo Vogrincic, Best Actor winner.

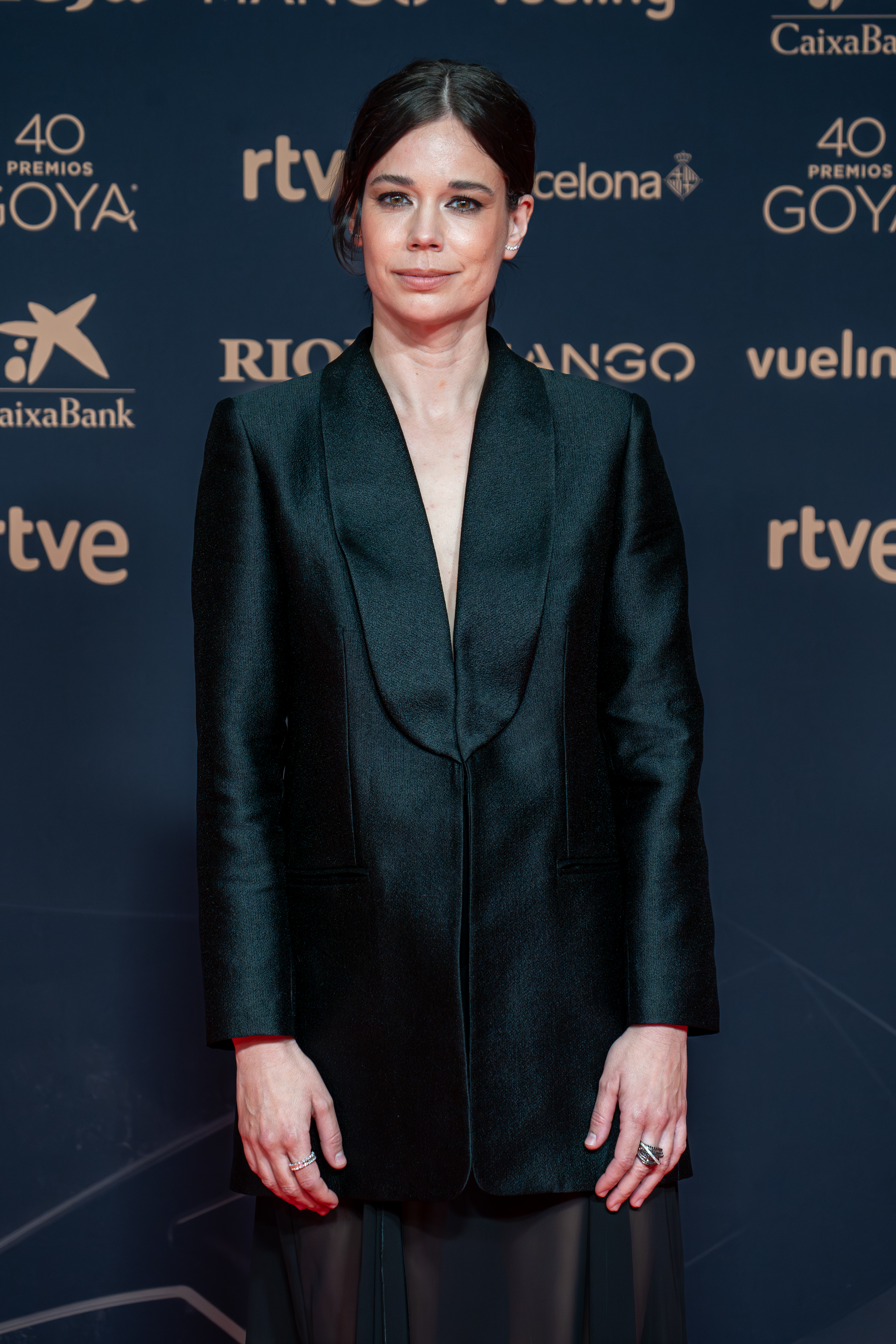
Laia Costa, Best Actress winner.

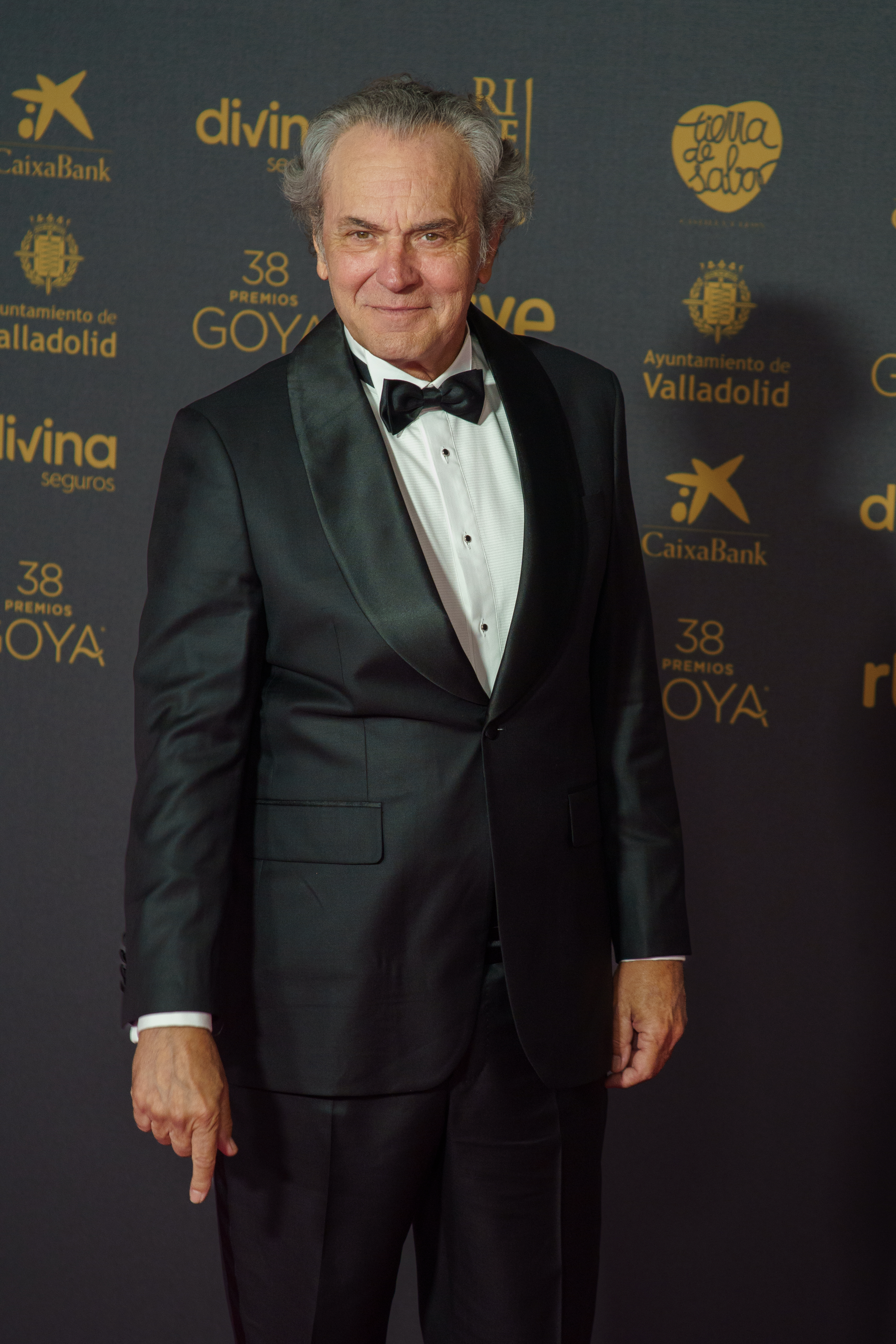
José Coronado, Best Supporting Actor winner.

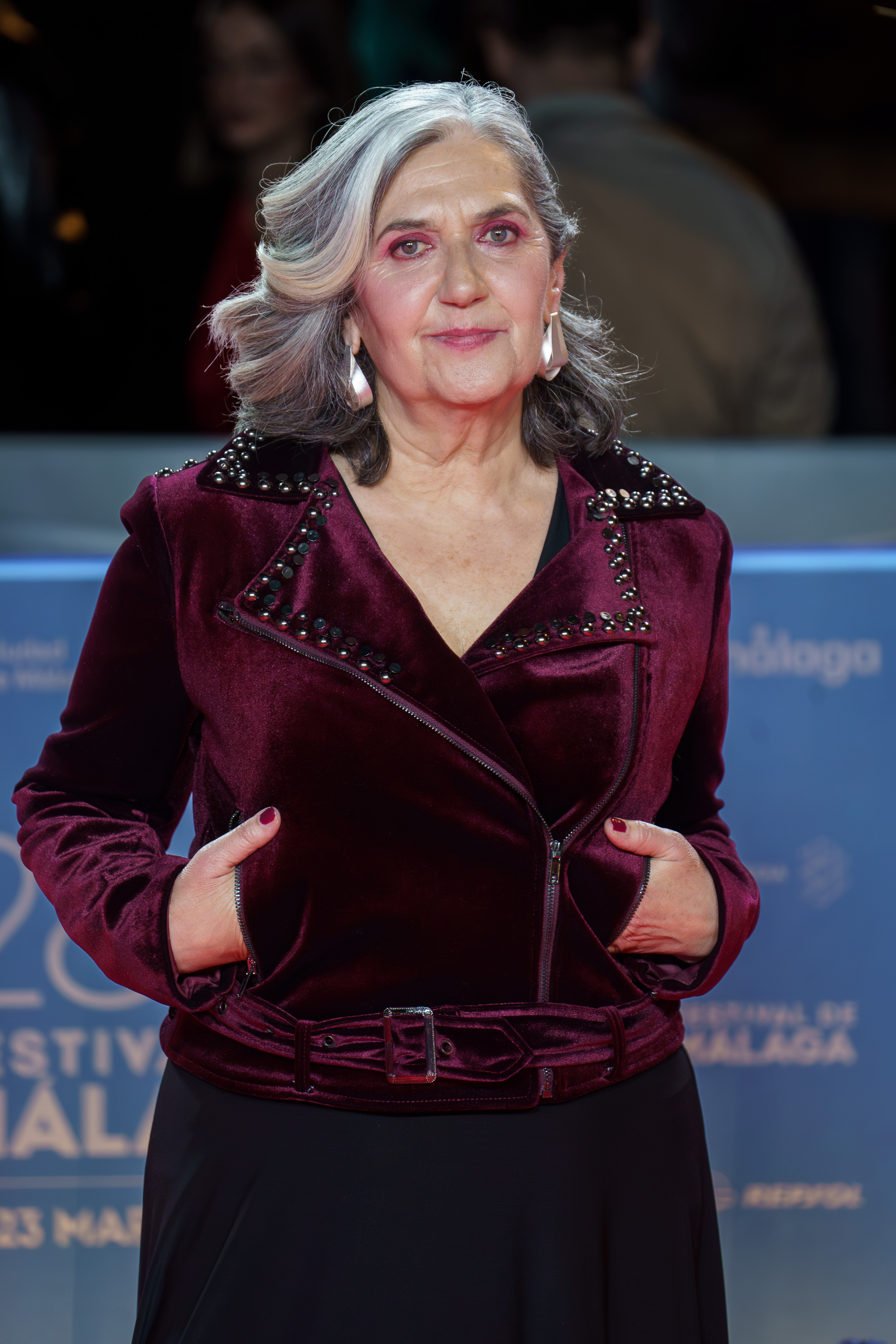
Ane Gabarain, Best Supporting Actress winner.

Best Ibero-American Film: Society of the Snow; Close Your Eyes; The Delinquents; Tótem	Best Director: J. A. Bayona – Society of the Snow; Isabel Coixet – Un amor; Lila Avilés – Tótem; Pablo Larraín – El conde
Best Actor: Enzo Vogrincic – Society of the Snow as Numa Turcatti; Damián Alcázar – The Monroy Affaire as Ronnie Monroy; David Verdaguer – Jokes & Cigarettes as Eugenio; Jaime Vadell – El conde as Augusto Pinochet; Marcelo Subiotto – Puan as Marcelo Pena	Best Actress: Laia Costa – Un amor as Nat; Carolina Yuste – Jokes & Cigarettes as Conchita; Dolores Fonzi – Blondi as Blondi; Lola Amores – Wild Woman as Yolanda; Malena Alterio – Something Is About to Happen as Lucía
Best Supporting Actor: José Coronado – Close Your Eyes as Julio Arenas; Leonardo Sbaraglia – Puan as Rafael Sujarchuk; Luis Bermejo – Un amor as casero; Matías Recalt – Society of the Snow as Roberto Canessa	Best Supporting Actress: Ane Gabarain – 20,000 Species of Bees as Lourdes; Alejandra Flechner – Puan as Doris; Ana Torrent – Close Your Eyes as Ana Arenas; Antonia Zegers – El conde as Jacinta
Best Screenplay: Estibaliz Urresola – 20,000 Species of Bees; Guillermo Calderón, Pablo Larraín – El conde –; Michel Gaztambide, Víctor Erice – Close Your Eyes; Rodrigo Moreno – The Delinquents	Best Original Score: Alfonso Vilallonga – Robot Dreams; Pascual Reyes, Juan Pablo Villa – Radical; Pedro Osuna– Blondi; Sergio de la Puente – The Fishbowl
Best Animated Film: Robot Dreams; They Shot the Piano Player; Sultana's Dream; Home Is Somewhere Else; Nayola	Best Documentary Film: The Eternal Memory; El juicio; La memoria del cine, una película sobre Fernando Méndez-Leite; Una jauría llamada Ernesto
Best Cinematography: Pedro Luque – Society of the Snow; Inés Duacastella, Alejo Maglio – The Delinquents; Simón Brauer, Tomás Astudillo – La piel pulpo; Valentín Álvarez– Close Your Eyes	Best Art Direction: Rodrigo Bazaes – El conde; Curru Garabal – Close Your Eyes; Julieta Dolinsky – Puan; Sebastián Orgambide –The Settlers
Best Editing: Andrés Gil, Jaume Martí – Society of the Snow; Adriana Martínez – Huesera: The Bone Woman; Carolina Siraqyan – The Eternal Memory; Manuel Ferrari, Nicolás Goldbart, Rodrigo Moreno – The Delinquents	Best Sound: Jorge Adrados, Oriol Tarragó, Marc Orts – Society of the Snow; Christian Giraudy, Omar Pareja – Huesera: The Bone Woman; Miguel Hormazábal – El conde; Pablo Isola – When Evil Lurks
Best Ibero-American Debut Film: 20,000 Species of Bees; Blondi; The Fishbowl; The Settlers; Simón; I Have Electric Dreams	Film and Values Education: 20,000 Species of Bees; The Eternal Memory; Puan; Radical
Best Ibero-American Comedy Film: Under Therapy; Los wánabis; Norma; Love & Revolution

==== Films with multiple nominations and wins ====
The following films received multiple wins:

Wins	Films
6	Society of the Snow
4	20,000 Species of Bees
2	Robot Dreams

The following films received multiple nominations:

Nominations	Films
7	Society of the Snow
6	Close Your Eyes
6	El conde
5	Puan
4	The Delinquents
4	20,000 Species of Bees
3	The Eternal Memory
3	Un amor
3	Blondi
2	Robot Dreams
2	Jokes & Cigarettes
2	Tótem
2	Radical
2	Huesera: The Bone Woman
2	The Settlers
2	The Fishbowl

=== Television ===
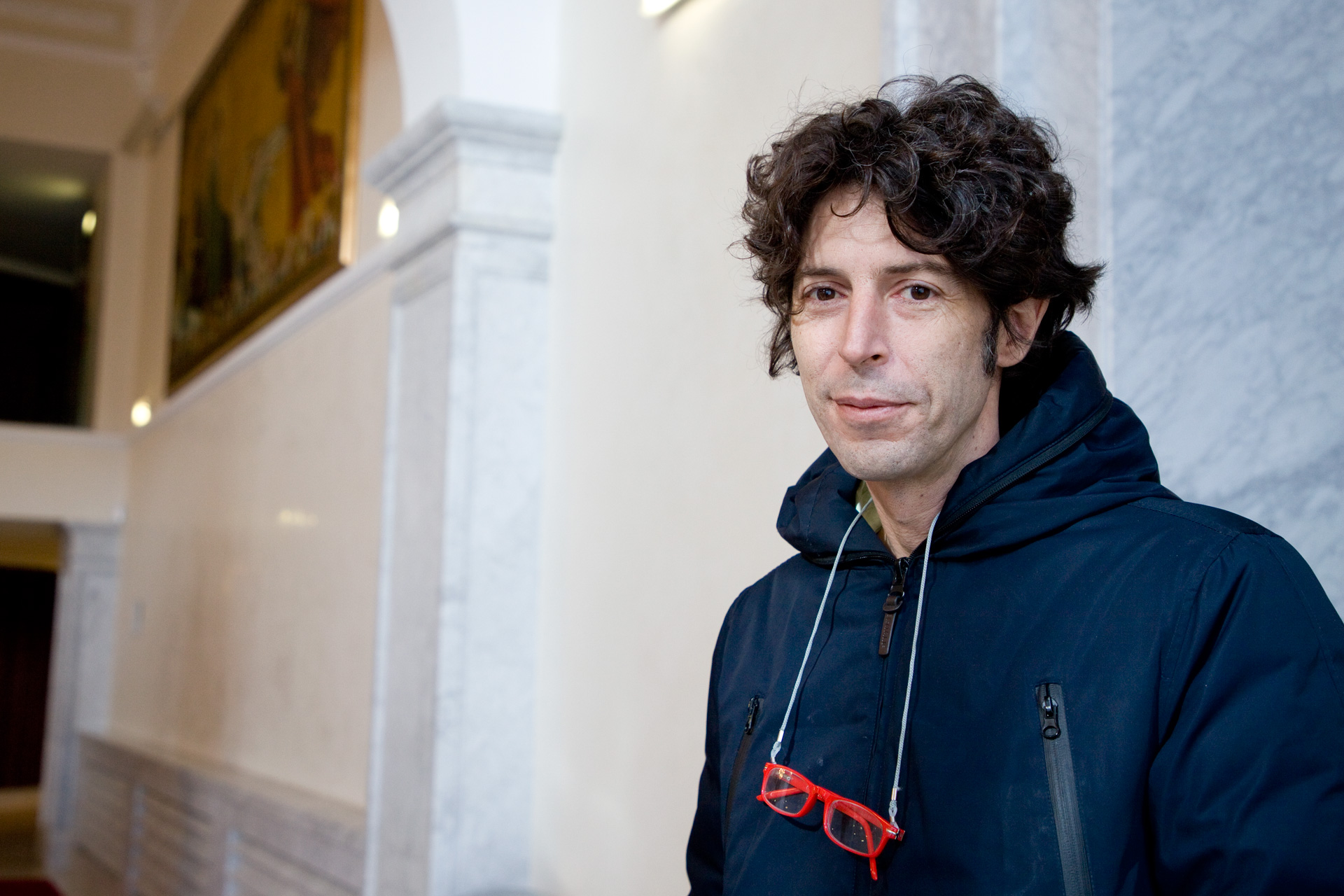
Andy Chango, Best Supporting Actor in a Miniseries or TV series winner.

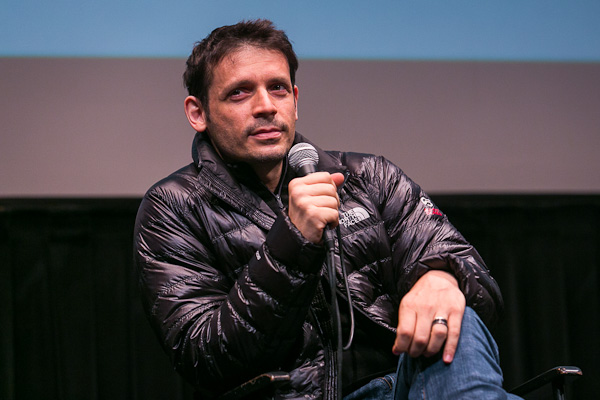
Daniel Burman, Best Series Creator winner.

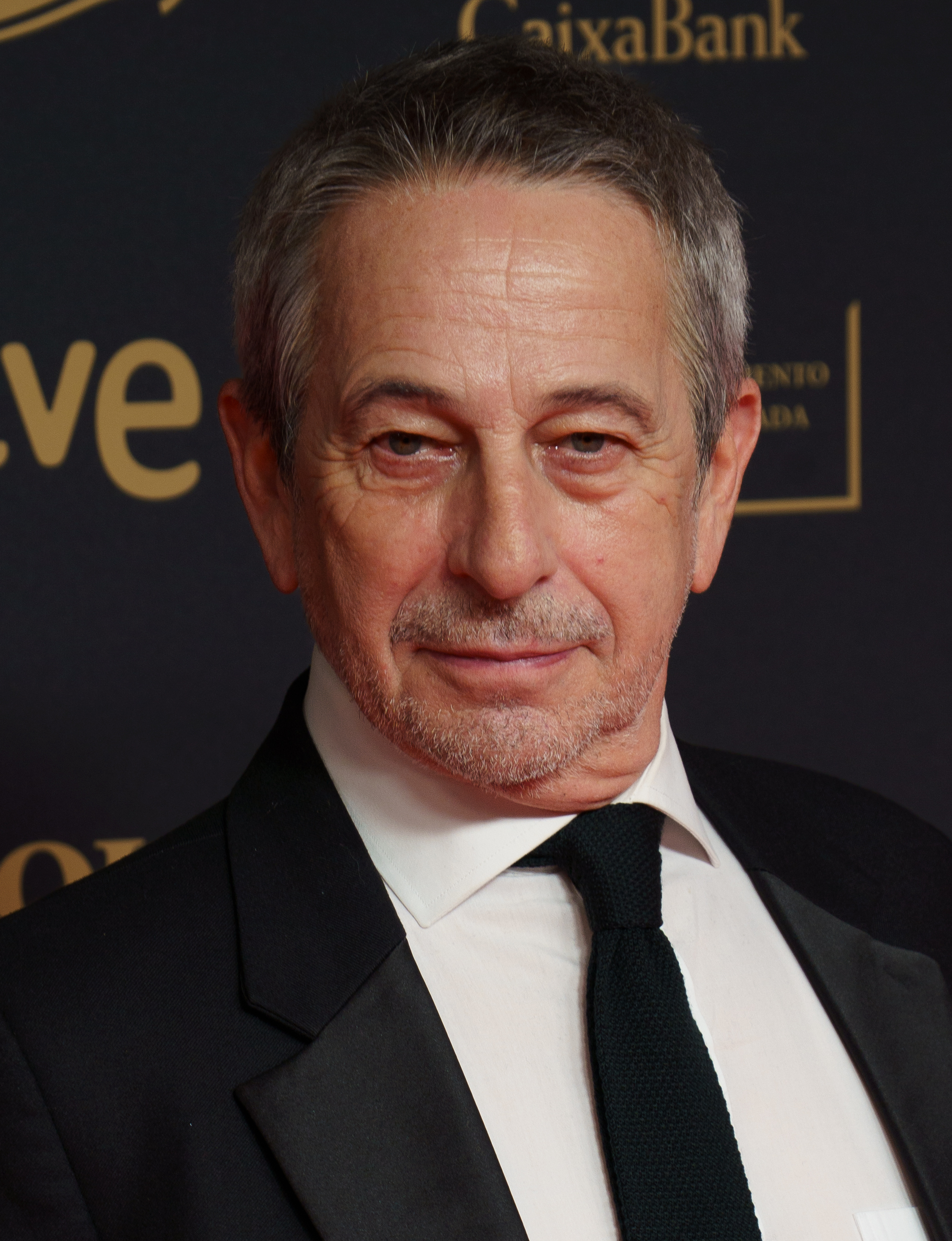
Alfredo Castro, Best Actor in a Miniseries or TV series winner.

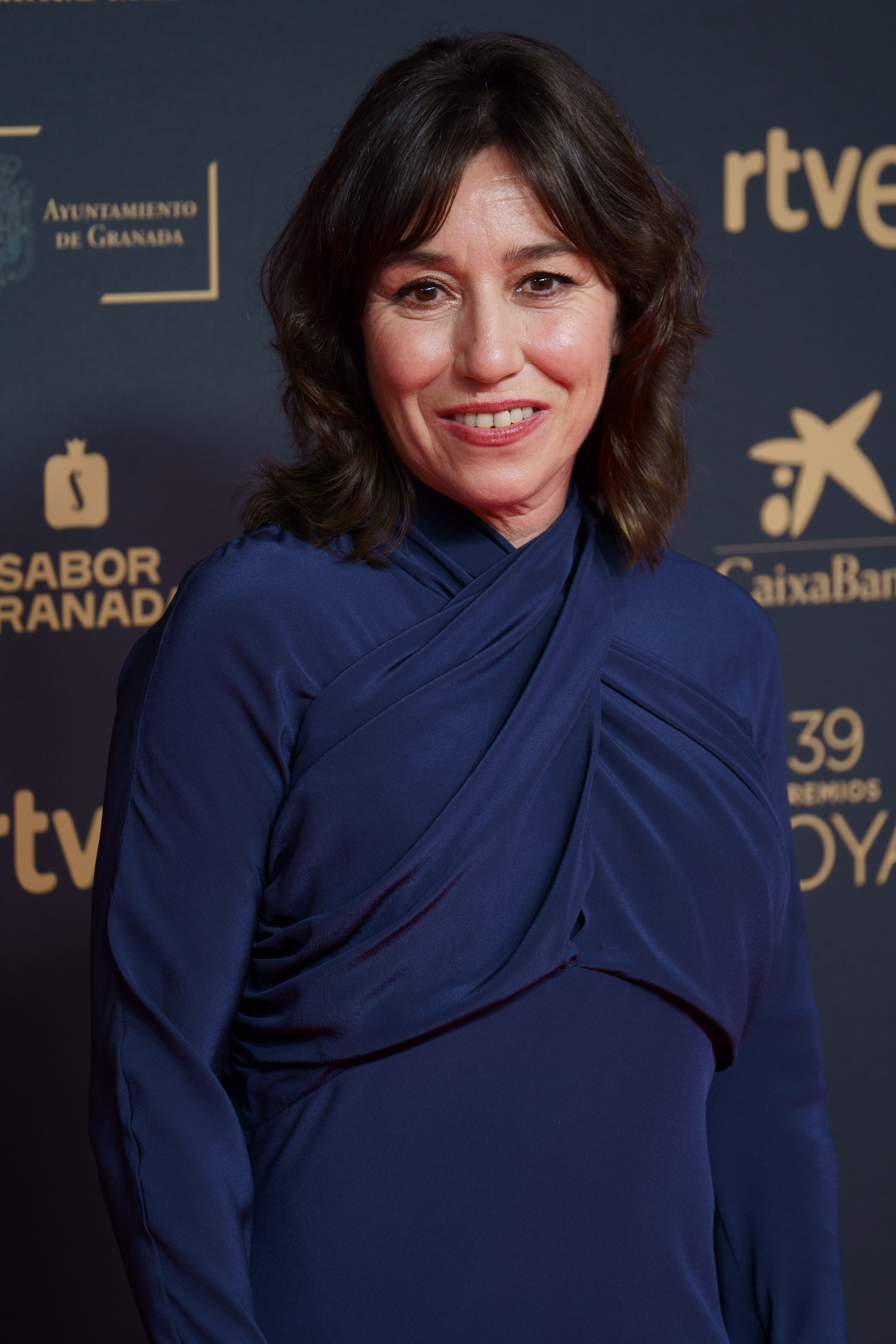
Lola Dueñas, Best Actress in a Miniseries or TV series winner.

Best Ibero-American Miniseries or TV series: Barrabrava; Burning Body; Yosi, the Regretful Spy; Allende, the Thousand Days	Best Series Creator: Daniel Burman — Yosi, the Regretful Spy; Álex de la Iglesia — 30 Coins; Juan Pablo Kolodziej — Love After Music; Santiago Korovsky — División Palermo
Best Actor in a Miniseries or TV series: Alfredo Castro — Allende, the Thousand Days as Salvador Allende; Gustavo Bassani — Yosi, the Regretful Spy as José Pérez / Yosi; Javier Cámara — Rapa as Tomás Hernández; Santiago Korovsky — División Palermo as Felipe Rozenfeld	Best Actress in a Miniseries or TV series: Lola Dueñas — La mesías as Montserrat; Aline Küppenheim — Allende, the Thousand Days as Hortensia Bussi Soto; Micaela Riera — Love After Music as Fabiana Cantilo; Úrsula Corberó — Burning Body as Rosa
Best Supporting Actor in a Miniseries or TV series: Andy Chango — Love After Music as Charly García; Daniel Hendler — División Palermo as Miguel Rossi; Emiliano Zurita — The Head of Joaquín Murrieta as Casey; Manolo Solo — 30 Coins as Cardinal Santoro	Best Supporting Actress in a Miniseries or TV series: Carmen Machi— La mesías as Montserrat; Minerva Casero — Yosi, the Regretful Spy as Dafne Menajem; Najwa Nimri — 30 Coins as Haruka; Pilar Gamboa — División Palermo as Sofía Vega

==== Series with multiple nominations and wins ====
The following series received multiple wins:

Wins	Series
2	La mesías

The following series received multiple nominations:

Wins	Series
4	Yosi, the Regretful Spy
4	División Palermo
3	Allende, the Thousand Days
3	30 Coins
3	Love After Music
2	Burning Body
2	La mesías

=== Platino Honorary Award ===
- Cecilia Roth

== Presenters and performers ==
The following individuals, listed in order of appearance, presented awards.

=== Presenters ===
Presenters
Name(s)	Role
Luisana Lopilato; Enzo Vogrincic	Presented the awards for Best Supporting Actor in a Miniseries or TV series and Best Supporting Actress in a Miniseries or TV series
Begoña Vargas; Cristo Fernández	Presented the award for Best Animated Film
Manolo Caro; Joaquín Furriel	Presented the award for Best Series Creator
Renata Notni; Juan Pablo Medina	Presented the award for Best Screenplay
Diego Calva; Yalitza Aparicio	Presented the awards for Best Supporting Actor and Best Supporting Actress
Alejandro Speitzer; Calle y Poché	Presented the award for Best Documentary
Nicolás Furtado; Pol Granch	Presented the award for Best Original Score
Adrián Solar; Sara Linares; Zurab Pololikashvili	Presented the award for Film and Values Education
Mina Serrano; Carlos Torres; Alberto Guerra; Gaby Espino	Presented the awards for Best Film Editing, Best Art Direction, Best Cinematography and Best Sound
Jorge López; Blanca Suárez	Presented the award for Best Comedy Film
Gabriel Leone; Mabel Moreno	Presented the awards for Best Actress in a Miniseries or TV series and Best Actor in a Miniseries or TV series
Carolina Ramírez; Manu Ríos	Presented the award for Best First Feature Film
Enrique Cerezo	Presented the Platino Honorary Award
Ana Claudia Talancón; Santiago Mitre	Presented the award for Best Director
Manny Pérez; Antonia Zegers	Presented the awards for Best Actor and Best Actress
Enrique Arce; Cristina Umaña	Presented the award for Best Miniseries or TV series
Alice Braga; Alfonso Herrera	Presented the award for Best Ibero-American Film

=== Performers ===
Artist(s)	Song(s)
Gerónimo Rauch Diana Hoyos	Opening Act
Monsieur Periné	"Nuestra Canción"
Ana Mena	"La Gata Bajo la Lluvia"
Angela Aguilar	"Obsesión"
Ana Guerra Mariaca Semprún Majida Issa	"La Bikina" "La Llorona" "México en la Piel"
David Bisbal	"Ajedrez" "Esclavo de sus Besos" "Bulería" "Ave María"
