= Silver Condor Award for Best First Film =

Annual Argentine film award

The Silver Condor Award for Best First Film (Spanish: Premio Cóndor de Plata a la mejor ópera prima), given by the Argentine Film Critics Association, awards the best first film each year.

== Winners ==
Year	Film	Director
1963	La cifra impar	Manuel Antín
1982	Momentos	María Luisa Bemberg
1985	Evita, quien quiera oír que oiga	Eduardo Mignogna
1987	La película del rey	Carlos Sorín
1992	Después de la tormenta	Tristán Bauer
1994	Tango feroz: la leyenda de Tanguito	Marcelo Piñeyro
1996	Patrón	Jorge Rocca
1997	Sotto Voce; Rapado	Mario Levín; Martín Rejtman
1998	La vida según Muriel	Eduardo Milewicz
1999	Pizza, birra, faso	Bruno Stagnaro and Israel Adrián Caetano
2000	Mundo grúa	Pablo Trapero
2001	Felicidades	Lucho Bender
2002	La Ciénaga	Lucrecia Martel
2003	Herencia	Paula Hernández
2004	Bar El Chino	Daniel Burak
2005	Buena vida delivery	Leonardo Di Cesare
2006	Cama adentro	Jorge Gaggero
2007	El Custodio	Rodrigo Moreno
2008	Las mantenidas sin sueños	Vera Fogwill
2009	Cordero de Dios	Lucía Cedrón
2010	El asaltante	Pablo Fendrik
2011	Rompecabezas	Natalia Smirnoff
2012	El estudiante	Santiago Mitre
2013	El último Elvis	Armando Bo
2014	Por un tiempo	Gustavo Garzón
2015	Los dueños	Agustín Toscano y Ezequiel Raduzky
2016	Ciencias naturales La Salada	Matías Lucchesi; Juan Martín Hsu
2017	La noche	Edgardo Castro
2018	La novia del desierto	Cecilia Atán and Valeria Pivato
2019	Familia sumergida La cama	María Alché; Mónica Lairana
2020	Las buenas intenciones	Ana García Blaya
