= Puan (film) =

- Theatrical release poster
- Directed by: María Alché; Benjamín Naishtat
- Screenplay by: María Alché; Benjamín Naishtat
- Produced by: Bárbara Sarasola-Day; Federico Eibuszyc; Bárbara Francisco Mendivil
- Starring: Marcelo Subiotto; Julieta Zylberberg; Alejandra Flechner; Cristina Banegas; Andrea Frigerio; Mara Bestelli; Leonardo Sbaraglia
- Cinematography: Hélène Louvart
- Edited by: Lívia Serpa
- Music by: Santiago Dolan
- Production companies: A Pasto; Pucará Cine; Infinity Hill; Pandora Filmproduktion; Atelier de Production; Kino Produzioni; Bubbles Project
- Distributed by: Digicine
- Release dates: 26 September 2023 (Zinemaldia); 5 October 2023 (Argentina)
- Running time: 109 minutes
- Countries: Argentina; Italy; France; Germany; Brazil
- Language: Spanish

Puan is a 2023 comedy-drama film directed and written by María Alché and Benjamín Naishtat. Its cast features Marcelo Subiotto, Julieta Zylberberg, Alejandra Flechner, Cristina Banegas, Andrea Frigerio, Mara Bestelli, and Leonardo Sbaraglia. It is an Argentine-Italian-French-German-Brazilian international co-production.

== Plot ==
The plot tracks a political philosophy lecturer of the university on the Puan street of Buenos Aires whose prospects for taking the vacant chair of deceased professor Caselli are threatened by the return of a former colleague back from Germany.

== Cast ==
- Marcelo Subiotto as Marcelo Pena
- Julieta Zylberberg
- Alejandra Flechner as Doris
- Cristina Banegas
- Andrea Frigerio
- Mara Bestelli as Vicky
- Leonardo Sbaraglia as Rafael Sujarchuk
- Camila Peralta
- Héctor Bidonde
- Lali Espósito as Vera Mota
- Zulema Galperín as Amelia

== Production ==
The film is an Argentine-Italian-French-German-Brazilian co-production by A Pasto and Pucará Cine along with Infinity Hill, Pandora Filmproduktion, Atelier de Production, Kino Produzioni, and Bubbles Project.

== Release ==
The film entered the main competition of the 71st San Sebastián International Film Festival, making its debut on 26 September 2023. Distributed by Digicine, it opened in Argentine theatres on 5 October 2023.

== Reception ==
According to the American review aggregation website Rotten Tomatoes, Puan has a 90% approval rating based on 10 reviews from critics, with an average rating of 7.7/10.

Jessica Kiang of Variety deemed the film to be "a fleet-footed if sharply pointed existential-crisis comedy, shot with unobtrusive, naturalistic dynamism by Hélène Louvart".

Marcelo Stiletano of La Nación gave the film a 'very good' rating assessing that on the surface, the film works like a charm as a college-set madcap comedy, but it also is a tragicomedy.

Bartolomé Armentano of Rolling Stone considered that, in addition of the showcase of the cast, the film features another great achievement, that of "the accurate representation of university life and academic endogamy".

== Accolades ==
Year	Award	Category	Nominee(s)	Result	Ref.
2023	71st San Sebastián International Film Festival	Silver Shell for Best Leading Performance	Marcelo Subiotto	Won	
2023	71st San Sebastián International Film Festival	Best Screenplay	María Alché, Benjamín Naishtat	Won	
2023	29th Forqué Awards	Best Latin-American Film		Nominated	
2024	38th Goya Awards	Best Ibero-American Film		Nominated	
2024	11th Platino Awards	Best Actor	Marcelo Subiotto	Nominated	
2024	11th Platino Awards	Best Supporting Actor	Leonardo Sbaraglia	Nominated	
2024	11th Platino Awards	Best Supporting Actress	Alejandra Flechner	Nominated	
2024	11th Platino Awards	Best Art Direction	Julieta Dolinsky	Nominated	
2024	11th Platino Awards	Film and Values Education		Nominated	
2024	18th Sur Awards	Best Film		Nominated	
2024	18th Sur Awards	Best Director	María Alché, Benjamín Naishtat	Nominated	
2024	18th Sur Awards	Best Original Screenplay	María Alché, Benjamín Naishtat	Nominated	
2024	18th Sur Awards	Best Actor	Marcelo Subiotto	Won	
2024	18th Sur Awards	Best Supporting Actor	Leonardo Sbaraglia	Won	
2024	18th Sur Awards	Best New Actress	Camila Peralta	Nominated	
2024	18th Sur Awards	Best Original Score	Santiago Dolan	Won	
2024	66th Ariel Awards	Best Ibero-American Film		Nominated	

== See also ==
- List of Argentine films of 2023
