= The Extortion =

- Theatrical release poster
- Spanish: La extorsión
- Directed by: Martino Zaidelis
- Screenplay by: Emanuel Diez
- Produced by: Axel Kuschevatzky; Muriel Cabeza
- Starring: Guillermo Francella; Pablo A. Rago; Andrea Frigerio; Guillermo Arengo; Carlos Portaluppi; Alberto Ajaka; Mónica Villa
- Cinematography: Lucio Bonelli
- Edited by: Ariel Frajnd
- Music by: Pablo Borghi
- Production companies: 100 Bares; Cimarrón Cine; Infinity Hill; Particular Crowd
- Distributed by: Warner Bros. Pictures
- Release date: 6 April 2023
- Country: Argentina
- Language: Spanish

The Extortion (Spanish: La extorsión) is a 2023 Argentine thriller film directed by Martino Zaidelis from a screenplay by Emanuel Diez which stars Guillermo Francella alongside Pablo Rago and Andrea Frigerio.

== Plot ==
Veteran aircraft pilot Alejandro Petrossián, close to retirement, is blackmailed by the secret services after a manipulated medical test covering up Petrossián's partial hearing loss is leaked, thereby becoming a sort of courier in between the airports of Ezeiza and Barajas.

== Cast ==
- Guillermo Francella as Alejandro Petrossián
- Pablo Rago as Saavedra
- Andrea Frigerio as Carolina Guerrero
- Alberto Ajaka as Porchietto
- Carlos Portaluppi as Mario Aldana
- Mónica Villa as Rita Tirabosco
- Guillermo Arengo as Fernando Marconi
- Carla Pandolfi as Andrea Vitale

== Production ==
The screenplay was penned by Emanuel Diez. The film is a 100 Bares, Cimarrón Cine, Infinity Hill, and Particular Crowd production. It was shot on location at the Ezeiza and Barajas airports.

== Release ==
Distributed by Warner Bros. Pictures, the film was released theatrically in Argentina on 6 April 2023. It was the 2nd-most watched Argentine film in 2023 at the domestic box office, with 528,762 admissions.

== Accolades ==
Year	Award	Category	Nominee(s)	Result	Ref.
2024	18th Sur Awards	Best Supporting Actor	Pablo Rago	Nominated	
2024	18th Sur Awards	Best Original Score	Pablo Borghi	Nominated	
2024	18th Sur Awards	Best Editing	Ariel Frajnd	Nominated	
2024	18th Sur Awards	Best Sound	Gonzalo Matijas, Rubén Piputto, Matías Vilaro	Nominated	

== See also ==
- List of Argentine films of 2023
