= Blondi (film) =

- Theatrical release poster
- Directed by: Dolores Fonzi
- Screenplay by: Dolores Fonzi; Laura Paredes
- Produced by: Santiago Mitre; Dolores Fonzi; Agustina Llambí Campbell; Santiago Carabante
- Starring: Dolores Fonzi; Carla Peterson; Rita Cortese; Tito Rovito; Leonardo Sbaraglia
- Cinematography: Javier Juliá
- Edited by: Susana Leunda
- Music by: Pedro Osuna
- Production companies: La Unión de los Ríos; Setembro Cine; Gran Via Productions
- Distributed by: Digicine (ar); Karma Films (es)
- Release dates: 22 April 2023 (BAFICI); 1 June 2023 (Argentina); 3 July 2024 (Spain)
- Countries: Argentina; Spain; United States
- Language: Spanish

Blondi is a 2023 comedy-drama film directed, co-written, produced, and starred by Dolores Fonzi in her directorial debut feature.

== Plot ==
The plot follows the sibling-like relationship of single mother Rita with her 20-year-old son Mirko, as well with Blondi's other relatives Pepa (mother), Martina (elder sister), and Eduardo (brother-in-law).

== Cast ==
- Dolores Fonzi as Blondi Basile
- Toto Rovito as Mirko
- Carla Peterson as Martina
- Rita Cortese as Pepa
- Leonardo Sbaraglia as Eduardo

== Production ==
Blondi was written by Dolores Fonzi and Laura Paredes. An Argentine-Spanish-American co-production by La Unión de los Ríos, Setembro Cine and Gran Via Productions, it had the collaboration of Amazon Studios.

== Release ==
Blondi had its world premiere on 22 April 2023 at Cine Gaumont during the Buenos Aires International Festival of Independent Cinema (BAFICI). Distributed by Digicine, it was released theatrically in Argentina on 1 June 2023. The film was also presented in the 'Latin Horizons' section of the 71st San Sebastián International Film Festival on 24 September 2023. Distributed by Karma Films, it is set to be released theatrically in Spain on 3 July 2024.

== Reception ==
On the review aggregator website Rotten Tomatoes, 83% of 12 critics' reviews are positive, with an average rating of 7.5/10.

Ezequiel Boetti of Página|12 rated Blondi with 8 points, deeming it to be a film with "a minimal anecdote" but carrying "an emotional weight uncommon for Argentine cinema".

Alfonso Rivera of Cineuropa wrote that the film "[is] brimming with life, [is full of] hilarious dialogues and [features] a dedicated and marvelously harmonized cast".

Belén Vázquez Prieto of La Nación gave the film a 'very good' rating, writing that it displays "a genuine enthusiasm for storytelling and at the same time avoids the easy path of turning his characters into mere expressions of their ideas".

Nuria Vidal of Cinemanía rated the film 4 out of 5 stars, declaring it "a light, free, funny comedy that tackles very tough subjects" and in which what ends up dominating "is the feeling of optimism".

== Accolades ==
Year	Award	Category	Nominee(s)	Result	Ref.
2024	11th Platino Awards	Best Ibero-American Debut Film		Nominated	
2024	11th Platino Awards	Best Actress	Dolores Fonzi	Nominated	
2024	11th Platino Awards	Best Original Score	Pedro Osuna	Nominated	
2024	18th Sur Awards	Best Film		Nominated	
2024	18th Sur Awards	Best Debut Film		Won	
2024	18th Sur Awards	Best Director	Dolores Fonzi	Nominated	
2024	18th Sur Awards	Best Original Screenplay	Dolores Fonzi, Laura Paredes	Nominated	
2024	18th Sur Awards	Best Actress	Dolores Fonzi	Won	
2024	18th Sur Awards	Best Actor	Toto Rovito	Nominated	
2024	18th Sur Awards	Best Supporting Actress	Rita Cortese	Won	
2024	18th Sur Awards	Best Supporting Actress	Carla Peterson	Nominated	
2024	18th Sur Awards	Best New Actor	Toto Rovito	Won	
2024	18th Sur Awards	Best Cinematography	Javier Julia	Nominated	
2024	18th Sur Awards	Best Costume Design	Paula Kasakoff, Greta Ure	Nominated	
2024	18th Sur Awards	Best Art Direction	Micaela Saiegh	Nominated	
2024	18th Sur Awards	Best Makeup and Characterization	Angela Garacija, Malvina Mariani	Nominated	

== See also ==
- List of Argentine films of 2023
- List of Spanish films of 2024
