= A Mysterious World =

2011 film

- Directed by: Rodrigo Moreno
- Written by: Rodrigo Moreno
- Starring: Esteban Bigliardi
- Cinematography: Gustavo Biazzi
- Release date: 16 February 2011 (Berlinale)
- Running time: 107 minutes
- Country: Argentina
- Language: Spanish

A Mysterious World (Spanish: Un mundo misterioso) is 2011 Argentine drama film directed by Rodrigo Moreno. The film premiered In Competition at the 61st Berlin International Film Festival and was nominated for the Golden Bear.

== Cast ==
- Esteban Bigliardi as Boris
