= Guardia Urbana crime =

2017 murder in Barcelona, Spain

Murder of Pedro Rodríguez
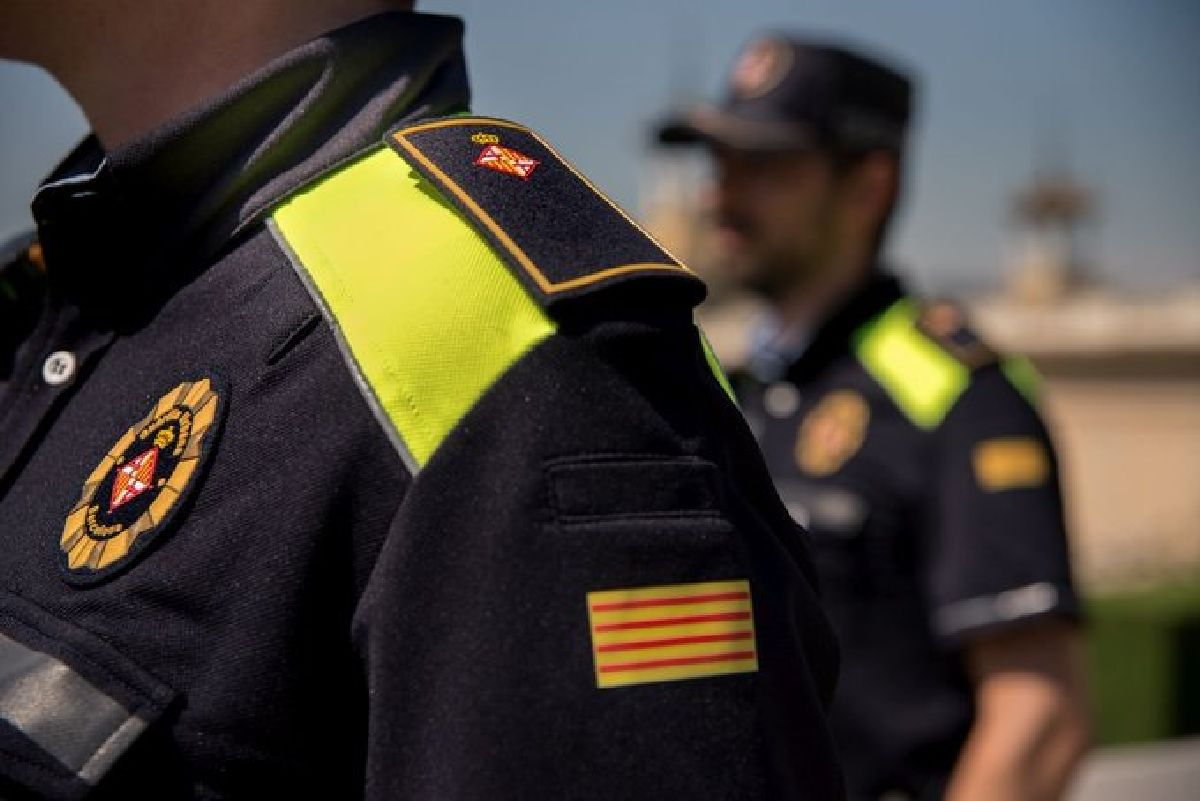
- Location: 41°12′36″N 1°40′25″E; Cubelles, Catalonia, Spain Spain
- Date: May 1, 2017
- Target: Pedro Rodríguez
- Attack type: Murder
- Weapon: Edged and bladed weapons
- Deaths: 1
- Perpetrators: Rosa Peral; Albert López
- Motive: Homicide

The "Guardia Urbana crime" is the name given in Spain to the murder of Pedro Rodríguez, a 38-year-old officer of the Guàrdia Urbana de Barcelona whose charred body was found on 4 May 2017 inside a burned-out car near the Foix Reservoir after a love triangle inside that organization went wrong.

== Previous problematic behaviour ==
All three members of the love triangle had been involved in major scandals within the Barcelona police force in the months leading up to the murder. Rosa Peral (coperpetrator of the crime) had reported being the victim of a case of revenge porn by a senior officer who was prosecuted for allegedly distributing an intimate photo of her, but he was ultimately acquitted in January 2018 by Criminal Court No. 17 of Barcelona.

Additionally, in 2014, Albert López (the other confessed perpetrator) had participated in the arrest of a man in Montjuïc who died during the process. At the time of the murder, the victim himself was suspended from duty for assaulting a motorcyclist on the Rabassada Road.

== Trial ==
The trial with a jury began on 3 February 2020. The victim’s partner, Rosa María Peral Viñuela (Badalona, 24 October 1983), and her lover, Albert López Ferrer (Badalona, 20 June 1981), both also officers of the Barcelona Guardia Urbana, were accused of having killed Rodríguez at home during the night of 1 May 2017 and of having hidden the body in the trunk of his car the following day and driving it to the Foix reservoir, where they burned it.

During the trial, the two defendants blamed each other. Peral claimed López had killed her boyfriend out of jealousy. López claimed Peral killed him after an argument and later asked for help in disposing of the body. The prosecution argued that both carried out a premeditated plan to murder Rodríguez so they could resume their romantic relationship. The prosecution sought 20 years in prison for López and 25 years for Peral for murder with malice aforethought, and in her case, with the aggravating factor of kinship.

By the end of March 2020, after six days of deliberations, eight out of ten jurors found Peral guilty and seven found López guilty of the murder of Pedro Rodríguez with malice aforethought. Peral and López were sentenced to 25 and 20 years in prison, respectively. Additionally, both were ordered to pay the victim's family €880,000 in compensation.

Of this amount, Rosa Peral has paid €1,655, while Albert López has paid €20. Although the crime was the same for both, Peral received five additional years due to the aggravating factor of kinship. Both defendants appealed the ruling, but were unsuccessful: the High Court of Justice of Catalonia and the Supreme Court of Spain upheld the sentence.

== Public reaction and cultural impact ==
The murder of Pedro Rodríguez quickly became one of the most high-profile criminal cases in Spain in the 2010s. The combination of a love triangle, betrayal within the police force, and the shocking nature of the crime captivated public attention and was widely discussed across all forms of media. Spanish newspapers, talk shows, and online platforms covered the case extensively, often emphasizing the personal and sensational aspects of the story. Media coverage of the case frequently emphasized Rosa Peral’s romantic and sexual relationships with multiple colleagues in the Guàrdia Urbana, which were portrayed by some outlets as indicative of promiscuity. These relationships, some of which were concurrent, became a focal point in both the public narrative and the trial itself, shaping perceptions of her character and motives — and adding a moral undertone or judgment to it from the media.

This intense media interest was fueled by a strong element of what in Spain is commonly known as morbo: a mix of morbid fascination and voyeurism toward the lurid details of the crime and the private lives and general behaviour or lifestyle of the accused, both of whom were police officers involved in a romantic and professional scandal. The case became a media frenzy comparable to the Alcàsser Girls case or the Wanninkhof-Carabantes case, prompting debates about media ethics and the limits of public curiosity.

== In popular culture ==
The case was featured in The Guardia Urbana Crime, a four-part docuseries released in January 2022, which was a Spanish-dubbed version of the TV3 program Crims, by Carles Porta i Gaset, covering some of the most shocking crimes in recent years.

In September 2022, it was announced that a miniseries inspired by the event would be created for the first time: Burning Body. The lead roles were played by actors Úrsula Corberó and Quim Gutiérrez, alongside José Manuel Poga and Isak Férriz. Filming began on 19 September 2022 in Barcelona, and the series premiered on Netflix on 8 September 2023.

In addition to extensive television and newspaper coverage, the case was also the subject of several podcasts and audio documentaries. One notable example is El crimen de la Guardia Urbana, an episode from the Spanish true crime podcast series ¿Hablas Miedo? II, written and narrated by Mona León Siminiani and produced by Audible Originals. The episode reconstructs the events surrounding the murder of Pedro Rodríguez, framing it as a story of jealousy, betrayal, and passion.
