= Mariano Grondona =

Argentine lawyer, sociologist, political scientist

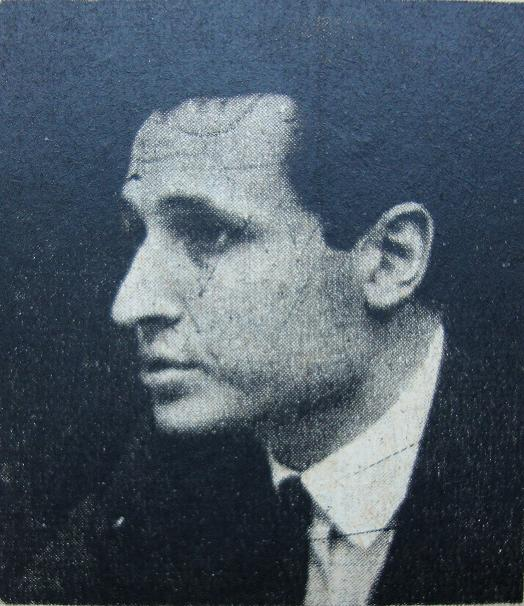
Mariano Grondona in 1964

Mariano Grondona (born 19 October 1932 in Buenos Aires) is an Argentine lawyer, sociologist, political scientist, essayist, and commentator. He has been a journalist for several decades, contributing to print media and television, and has authored numerous books. Additionally, he has held teaching positions in several universities, both in Argentina and abroad.

== As an academic ==
Grondona studied Law and Social Sciences at the University of Buenos Aires (UBA). He pursued postgraduate studies in Sociology at the University of Madrid and in Political Science at the Political Studies Institute of Madrid. Since 1984, he has been a professor of Political Law at UBA.

== Media career ==
Mr. Grondona wrote for and, in its final years, directed Visión:La Revista Latinoamericana, the most significant post-war hemispheric magazine, from 1978 to 1995. He served as the international news writer for the daily newspaper La Nación from 1987 to 1996. Later, he became a political op-ed writer for the same newspaper, a position he has held since 1996.

Since 1989, he has hosted his weekly TV program.

In 1997, he received the Platinum and Diamond Konex Award for Communication-Journalism and was awarded the Konnex Merit Diploma in the field of Political Analysis in 1987.

During the 2000s, he hosted two radio shows: Las claves del día and Pensando con Mariano Grondona.

== Political standing ==
Grondona's views are considered right-wing, with a strong Catholic element, contrasting with the more liberal but still conservative ideology of other right-wing opinion leaders, such as the late Álvaro Alsogaray. Regarding Argentine foreign policy, he supports alignment with the United States.

In the mid-1960s, Grondona supported the coup that brought dictator Juan Carlos Onganía to the presidency and subsequently held public office in his government. However, he grew disappointed with the outcome and was eventually dismissed. He stated that he "had tried to make a de Gaulle of Onganía, and got a Franco instead".

In the 1970s, Grondona was a supporter of presidents Héctor José Cámpora and Juan Perón. After Perón's death during his term, Grondona aligned with the policies of Isabel Perón's Welfare Minister, José López Rega, who was the founder of the Argentine Anti-Communist Alliance.

As Isabel Perón's government fell apart, Grondona advocated the participation of the military and welcomed the beginning of the National Reorganization Process in 1976. A non-authorized biography of Grondona, El Doctor, by Martín Sivak (2005), pointed out that he worked as an advisor of military junta member Brigadier Basilio Lami Dozo, on whose request he wrote a government programme titled Bases Políticas para la Reorganización Nacional (echoing Juan Bautista Alberdi's Bases and Points of Departure for the Political Organization of the Argentine Republic).

In his program "Hora Clave" on March 16, 2003, he declared about the dictatorship in Argentina from 1976 to 1983 that "The rational behavior, in any war, is to be on the side of the winners". On the day of former Chilean dictator Augusto Pinochet's death, he declared in the same program that "If Allende had stayed in power, Chile would have probably become a communist country", as well as "I can understand that someone that has a fascist ideology, will try to live by what he considers his "principles" [...], but what really disappointed me is the fact that he had bank accounts in Switzerland. That is intolerable".

== Bibliography ==
- Política y Gobierno, Buenos Aires, Columba, 1962.
- La Argentina en el Tiempo y el Mundo, Buenos Aires, Sudamericana, 1967.
- Los Dos Poderes, Buenos Aires, Emecé, 1973.
- La Construcción de la Democracia, Buenos Aires, Eudeba, 1973.
- Los Pensadores de la Libertad, Sudamericana, 1986.
- Bajo el imperio de las Ideas Morales, Buenos Aires, Sudamericana, 1988.
- Values and Development, Harvard University, Source Book, 1988.
- Toward a Theory of Development, Harvard University, Author's Workshop, 1990.
- El posliberalismo, Buenos Aires, Planeta, 1992.
- La corrupción, Buenos Aires, Planeta, 1994.
- La Argentina como vocación, Buenos Aires, Planeta, 1994.
- El mundo en clave, Buenos Aires, Planeta, 1996.
- Las condiciones culturales del desarrollo económico, Buenos Aires, Planeta, 1999.
- La realidad, Buenos Aires, Planeta, 2001.
- Estepas de una noche agitada, Buenos Aires, Planeta, 2016.
