= Carles Porta i Gaset =

Carles Porta
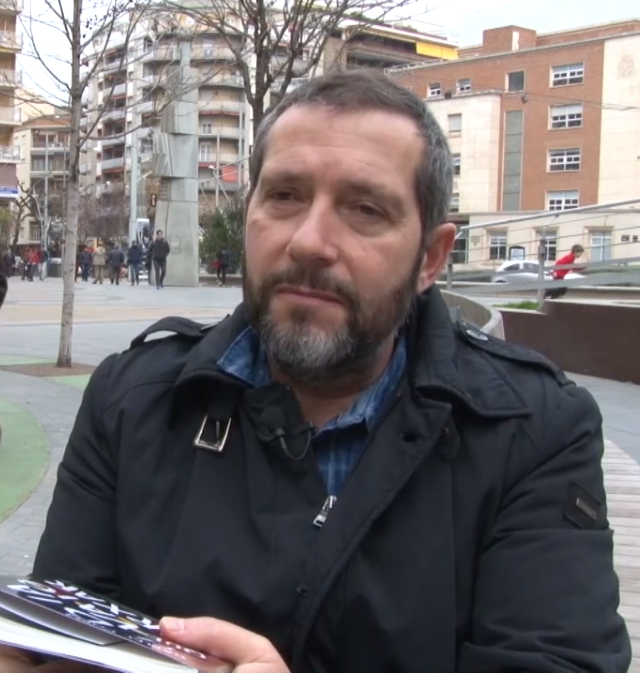
- Carles Porta in 2017
- Born: Carles Porta i Gaset; 19 November 1963 (age 62); Vila-sana, Pla d'Urgell, Catalonia, Spain
- Occupations: Journalist, producer, director, screenwriter, writer
- Years active: 1980s–present
- Employer(s): TV3, Catalunya Ràdio
- Known for: Narrative journalism, crime books, crime documentaries and crime podcasts.
- Notable work: Crims (TV and radio programs); Tor, tretze cases i tres morts; El segrest; ¿Por qué matamos?
- Awards: Ondas Award (2021); Zapping Award (2022); Godó Journalism Prize (2015); Pere Quart Prize for Humor and Satire (2010)

Carles Porta i Gaset (born 19 November 1963 in Vila-sana, Pla d'Urgell) is a Catalan journalist, producer, director, screenwriter and writer, specialized in crime journalism and investigation.

He obtained recognition in Catalonia and Spain for the success of his program Crims ("Crimes") on TV3 (as a TV program) and Catalunya Ràdio (as an audio program, or podcast), as well as for the podcasts Tor, tretze cases i tres morts, El segrest, both broadcast on Catalunya Ràdio, and "¿Por qué matamos?" in Audible.

His books Tor, tretze cases i tres morts (La Campana, 2005) and Li deien pare (Pòrtic, 2016) are also notable.

== Career ==
He began his career as a journalist at the newspaper Segre which covers the province of Lleida. In 1990 he joined TV3, working first at the Lleida delegation and later in the central news services and on 30 Minuts. He was part of teams of special correspondents covering wars such as the ones happened in Bosnia, Rwanda, Kosovo and the Middle East. While working at the same channel, he created and directed the program Efecte Mirall. In 2005 he burst onto the Catalan literary scene with the book Tor, tretze cases i tres morts, published by La Campana. Both critically—he was even called "the Catalan Truman Capote"—and among readers, Tor became a phenomenon in Catalonia, selling more than 50,000 copies and being translated into Spanish (Anagrama, 2006) and German (Berlin Verlag, 2007).

Between 2010 and 2016 he published the novel El club dels perfectes (La Campana) —winner of the Pere Quart Prize for Humor and Satire— and Fago. Si et diuen que el teu germà és un assassí in Catalan and Spanish (La Campana), which received the Huertas Clavería Award. In 2016 he released L'amic president (La Campana) and Li deien pare (Pòrtic/Península), which won the Godó Journalism Prize.

In 2017 he published the young adult novel El dia que vaig marxar (Fanbooks).

Through his production company Antàrtida, Porta produced programs such as Picalletres and Bocamoll, numerous reports. Then participated as producer, screenwriter, and director in the feature film inspired by Manuel de Pedrolo’s Mecanoscrit del segon origen, titled Segon Origen, originally to be directed by Bigas Luna before his death. He also directed the historical docufiction series Comtes, l'origen de Catalunya.

Porta has also become a prominent figure in the field of podcasts. He has created and narrated several acclaimed true-crime audio series, including Tor, tretze cases i tres morts, Crims and El segrest for Catalunya Ràdio. The latter tells the story of the kidnapping of pharmacist Maria Àngels Feliu Bassols in a 25-episode binaural audio series. He also collaborated with Podium Podcast on the Spanish-language series Le llamaban padre.

In March 2021 he published La farmacèutica with La Campana (Catalan) and Reservoir Books (Spanish), telling the story of Maria Àngels Feliu’s kidnapping with greater depth than the podcast version. In May 2021, he released a new Audible podcast, ¿Por qué matamos?, featuring the actor Luis Tosar, now in its seventh season. The Crims TV show also aired on Movistar+ as Crímenes (translated to Spanish from Catalan original, with two seasons.

In October 2021, Crims won the Ondas Award for Best Radio Program. That same year he also received the National Communication Award, and in 2022 he won the Zapping Awards for Best Entertainment Program and Best Presenter.

In 2022 he published his latest book, Crims. Llum a la foscor (La Campana) and Crímenes. Diez casos reales (Reservoir Books), a collection of cases from his TV and radio programs plus some unpublished stories.

== Tor murders ==
His work on the story of Tor, a very small village in the Pyrenees where several murders occurred over a mountain's ownership dispute, brought him the greatest public recognition. He first covered it for the TV program 30 minuts, but he soon became fascinated with the case and continued his investigation. Meeting many of the protagonists, he gathered enough material to write Tor: tretze cases i tres morts, a bestseller. In 2017, Porta stated he had gathered more evidence and claimed to have discovered the identity of Josep Montané’s killer, though he never revealed the name.

== Bibliography ==
=== Literary journalism ===
- 2005 – Tor. Tretze cases i tres morts (La Campana)
- 2012 – Fago. Si et diuen que el teu germà és un assassí (La Campana)
- 2016 – Li deien pare (Pòrtic)
- 2020 – Crims. Tot el que llegireu és real (La Campana). An expanded edition appeared in 2022.
- 2021 – La farmacèutica. 496 dies segrestada (La Campana)
- 2022 – Crims. Llum a la foscor (La Campana)
- 2022 – Crims. La noia de Portbou (La Campana)
- 2023 – Crims. Pecats Capitals (La Campana)
- 2024 – Tor. Foc encès (La Campana)

=== Young adult fiction ===
- 2010 – El club dels perfectes (La Campana)
- 2017 – El dia que vaig marxar (Fanbooks)

=== Non-fiction ===
- 2016 – L'amic president (La Campana)

== Filmography ==
- 1999 – La força del vi, documentary (30 minuts, TV3)
- 2015 – Segon origen, feature film (director, producer)
- 2017 – Comtes, miniseries (director)
- 2019–present – Crims, series (director, screenwriter, producer)
- 2023–present – Luz en la oscuridad, series (director, screenwriter, producer)
- 2024 – Tor, la muntanya maleïda, docuseries (director)

== Awards and recognition ==
- 2010 – Pere Quart Prize for Humor and Satire for El club dels perfectes.
- 2012 – Huertas Clavería Journalism Award for Fago.
- 2015 – Godó Journalism Prize for Li deien pare.
- 2022 – Zapping Award for Best Presenter for Crims.
- 2022 – Iris Award nomination for Best Direction for Crims.
