= History of Fear =

2014 film

- Directed by: Benjamín Naishtat
- Written by: Benjamín Naishtat
- Starring: Jonathan Da Rosa
- Release date: 9 February 2014 (Berlin)
- Running time: 79 minutes
- Country: Argentina
- Language: Spanish

History of Fear (Spanish: Historia del Miedo) is a 2014 Argentine drama film directed by Benjamín Naishtat. The film had its premiere in the competition section of the 64th Berlin International Film Festival.

== Cast ==
- Jonathan Da Rosa as Pola
- Tatiana Giménez as Tati
- Mirella Pascual as Teresa
- Claudia Cantero as Edith
- Francisco Lumerman as Camilo
- César Bordón as Carlos
- Valeria Lois as Beatriz
- Elsa Bloise as Amalia
- Edgardo Castro as Marcelo
