= Carlos Moreno (actor) =

Argentine actor and director

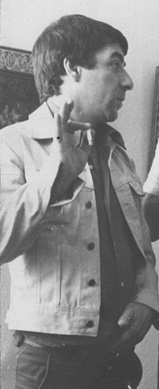
- Moreno in 1976
- Born: 29 August 1938; La Plata, Argentina
- Died: 9 March 2014 (aged 75); Buenos Aires, Argentina
- Occupation: Actor
- Children: Rodrigo Moreno

Carlos Moreno (29 August 1938 – 9 March 2014) was an Argentine actor. He primarily worked on movies and television shows. He was born in La Plata, Buenos Aires Province.

Moreno suffered a heart attack on 6 September 2013 and survived. On 9 March 2014, he suffered another heart attack, this time fatal, in Buenos Aires. He was 75 years old.
