= Rojo (film) =

2018 Argentine drama film

- Film poster
- Directed by: Benjamín Naishtat
- Written by: Benjamín Naishtat
- Produced by: Federico Eibuszyc; Barbara Sarasola-Day
- Starring: Darío Grandinetti; Andrea Frigerio; Alfredo Castro
- Cinematography: Pedro Sotero
- Edited by: Andrés Quaranta
- Music by: Vincent van Warmerdam
- Production companies: Bord Cadre Films; Desvia Productions; Ecce Films
- Release date: September 10, 2018 (TIFF)
- Running time: 109 minutes
- Countries: Argentina; Brazil; France; Netherlands; Germany; Belgium; Switzerland
- Language: Spanish

Rojo is a 2018 mystery thriller drama film, directed by Benjamín Naishtat and released in 2018. Set in the 1970s, the film stars Darío Grandinetti as Claudio Morán, a lawyer who becomes slowly enmeshed in the culture of silent bourgeois complicity around the strange unexplained enforced disappearances of political dissidents in the months leading up to the 1976 Argentine coup d'état.

The cast also includes Andrea Frigerio, Alfredo Castro, Diego Cremonesi, Laura Grandinetti, Susana Pampin, Rudy Chernicoff, Claudio Martinez, Mara Bestelli and Rafael Federman.

== Distribution ==
The film premiered in the Platform Prize program at the 2018 Toronto International Film Festival. and had its Argentine premiere on October 26

It secured an international distribution deal in 2018, and was released internationally in various territories including the United States, the United Kingdom and France in 2019.

== Reception ==
On review aggregator website Rotten Tomatoes, the film holds an approval rating of 96% based on 52 reviews, with an average rating of 7.3/10.

== Awards ==
Award	Date of ceremony	Category	Recipient(s)	Result	Ref(s)
San Sebastián International Film Festival	2018	Silver Shell for Best Director	Benjamín Naishtat	Won	
San Sebastián International Film Festival	2018	Silver Shell for Best Actor	Darío Grandinetti	Won	
San Sebastián International Film Festival	2018	Best Cinematography	Pedro Sotero	Won	
Argentine Film Critics Association	2019	Best Director	Benjamín Naishtat	Won	
Argentine Film Critics Association	2019	Best Actor	Darío Grandinetti	Won	
Argentine Film Critics Association	2019	Best Supporting Actor	Diego Cremonesi	Won	
Premios Sur	2019	Best Film	Federico Eibuszyc, Barbara Sarasola-Day, Benjamín Naishtat	Won	
Premios Sur	2019	Best Director	Benjamín Naishtat	Won	
Premios Sur	2019	Best Actor	Darío Grandinetti	Won	
Premios Sur	2019	Best Supporting Actor	Diego Cremonesi	Nominated	
Premios Sur	2019	Best Supporting Actor	Claudio Martinez	Nominated	
Premios Sur	2019	Best Supporting Actress	Andrea Frigerio	Nominated	
Premios Sur	2019	Best Original Screenplay	Benjamín Naishtat	Won	
Premios Sur	2019	Best Costume Design	Jam Monti	Nominated	
Premios Sur	2019	Best Editing	Andrés Quaranta	Won	
Premios Sur	2019	Best Sound	Fernando Ribero	Won	

== See also ==
- List of Argentine films of 2018
