= Almost Happy (TV series) =

2020 Argentine TV series

- Casi feliz
- Genre: Comedy
- Written by: Sebastián Wainraich
- Directed by: Hernán Guerschuny
- Starring: Sebastián Wainraich; Natalie Pérez; Santiago Korovsky
- Country of origin: Argentina
- Original language: Spanish
- No. of seasons: 2
- No. of episodes: 18

Production
- Running time: 22-28 minutes
- Production company: HC Films

Original release
- Network: Netflix
- Release: 1 May 2020 – 13 April 2022

Almost Happy (Spanish: Casi feliz) is an Argentine comedy television series directed by Hernán Guerschuny, written by Sebastián Wainraich and starring Sebastián Wainraich, Natalie Pérez and Santiago Korovsky. The plot revolves around the radio host Sebestián Wainraich and his personal and professional life.

It premiered on Netflix on May 1, 2020. Season 2 was released on April 13, 2022.

== Cast ==
- Sebastián Wainraich
- Natalie Pérez
- Santiago Korovsky
- Hugo Arana
- Adriana Aizemberg
- Peto Menahem

== Episodes ==
=== Season One ===
No.	Title	Directed by	Written by	Original release date
1	"Capítulo 1"	Unknown	Unknown	1 May 2020
2	"Capítulo 2"	Unknown	Unknown	1 May 2020
3	"Capítulo 3"	Unknown	Unknown	1 May 2020
4	"Capítulo 4"	Unknown	Unknown	1 May 2020
5	"Capítulo 5"	Unknown	Unknown	1 May 2020
6	"Capítulo 6"	Unknown	Unknown	1 May 2020
7	"Capítulo 7"	Unknown	Unknown	1 May 2020
8	"Capítulo 8"	Unknown	Unknown	1 May 2020
9	"Capítulo 9"	Unknown	Unknown	1 May 2020
10	"Capítulo 10"	Unknown	Unknown	1 May 2020

=== Season Two ===
No. overall	No. in season	Title	Directed by	Written by	Original release date
11	1	"Permiso para volver"	Unknown	Unknown	13 April 2022
12	2	"Dios Mio"	Unknown	Unknown	13 April 2022
13	3	"Actuar para vivir"	Unknown	Unknown	13 April 2022
14	4	"Beso"	Unknown	Unknown	13 April 2022
15	5	"Happy Happy"	Unknown	Unknown	13 April 2022
16	6	"Linea de 3"	Unknown	Unknown	13 April 2022
17	7	"Un Rio nos Separa"	Unknown	Unknown	13 April 2022
18	8	"Mamá"	Unknown	Unknown	13 April 2022

== Release ==
Almost Happy was released on 1 May 2020 on Netflix.
