= Glaxo (film) =

- Directed by: Benjamín Naishtat
- Written by: Benjamín Naishtat; Hernán Ronsino
- Based on: Glaxo by Hernán Ronsino
- Produced by: Benjamin Domenech; Santiago Gallelli; Berta Marchiori; Matias Roveda; Rodrigo Teixeira
- Starring: Lali Espósito; Esteban Lamothe; Marcelo Subiotto
- Cinematography: Pedro Sotero
- Production companies: RT Features; Rei Pictures
- Release date: 11 September 2026 (TIFF)
- Running time: 106 minutes
- Countries: Argentina; Brazil
- Language: Spanish

Glaxo is a 2026 drama film directed by Benjamín Naishtat, co-written with Hernán Ronsino and based on the same name novel by Hernán Ronsino. A co-production of Argentina and Brazil, it follows four young men living in a small Argentinian town which is home to a Glaxo pharmaceutical factory, whose lives and relationships begin to unravel after a retired police officer and his wife move to town.

The film had its world premiere in the Special Presentations section of the 2026 Toronto International Film Festival on 11 September.

== Cast ==
- Lali Espósito
- Marcelo Subiotto
- Esteban Lamothe
- Esteban Bigliardi
- Alan Sabbagh
- Manu Fanego
- Pablo Turturiello
- Martin Armendariz

== Production ==
Principal photography took place between October and late November of 2025.

== Release ==
The film premiered in the Special Presentations program at the 2026 Toronto International Film Festival on 11 September. It was also selected for the main competition of the 74th San Sebastián International Film Festival. In October 2026, it will compete at the 2026 BFI London Film Festival in official competition.
