= Porno y helado =

Argentine comedy television series

- Genre: Comedy
- Created by: Martín Piroyansky
- Starring: Martín Piroyansky; Sofía Morandi; Ignacio Saralegui
- Composers: Diego Rodríguez; Martín Bosa
- Country of origin: Argentina
- Original language: Spanish
- No. of seasons: 2
- No. of episodes: 14

Production
- Executive producers: Mariano Kohan; Mariano Varela
- Producers: Lucas Vivo García Lagos; Roberto Vivo
- Cinematography: Germán Nocella
- Editors: Karen Antunes; Lucía Garibaldi; Santiago Parysow; Geraldina Rodríguez
- Running time: 28–38 minutes
- Production companies: Navajo Films; Claxson; Salado

Original release
- Network: Amazon Prime Video
- Release: 11 March 2022 – present

Porn and Ice Cream (Spanish: Porno y helado) is an Argentine comedy television series created by Martín Piroyansky for Amazon Prime Video that premiered on March 11, 2022. It stars Piroyansky, Ignacio Saralegui and Sofía Morandi.

Filmed in Uruguay, the series stars a cast of Argentine and Uruguayan actors. In October 2022, it was renewed for a second season which premiered on September 20, 2024.

== Premise ==
Pablo (Martín Piroyansky) is an immature 30-year-old man who, together with his best friend Ramón (Ignacio Saralegui), who is not doing very well in life, decide to form a fake rock band with Cecilia (Sofía Morandi), a young scammer. After the release of their first hit inspired by watching pornography and eating ice cream, they manage to become popular. However, his lie soon gets out of control.

== Cast ==
=== Recurring ===
- Martín Piroyansky as Pablo
- Ignacio Saralegui as Ramón
- Sofía Morandi as Cecilia
- Eliseo Barrionuevo as Nacho
- Javier Niklison as Claudio
- Santiago Talledo as Segundo
- Gabriela Iribarren as Graciela
- Josefina Trías as Virginia
- Daniel Pérez as Haroldo
- Ernesto Liotti as Beto
- Vicente Varela as Santiago
- Matías Singer as Horacio Madariaga
- Bruno Pereyra as Bajista
- Jimena Márquez as Silvina

=== Guest ===
- Susana Giménez as Roxana
- Favio Posca as Picky Valeroso
- Pablo Tate as Joaquín
- Néstor Guzzini as Pereyra
- Humberto de Vargas as Sergio Vieira
- Laila Reyes as Noemí
- Santiago Korovsky as Juan Cruz "Spider" Vieira
- Jimena Anganuzzi as Enriqueta
- Roberto Suárez as Omar Quartirolo
- Horacio Camandule as Sandro
- Fernando Amaral as Bermúdez
- Julieta Spinelli as Olivia Vieira
- Myriam Gleijer as Elsa
- Hugo Bardallo as Ismael García Lagos
- Diego Delgrossi as Inspector Gómez
- Enzo Vogrincic as Franco
- Emilia Díaz as Leticia

== Production ==
=== Development ===
In January 2021, the Salado studio announced that pre-production of the series had begun, with Martín Piroyansky as creator, screenwriter and director. In March of the same year, Amazon ordered the production of eight episodes, which would be produced together with Navajo Films and Claxson.

=== Filming ===
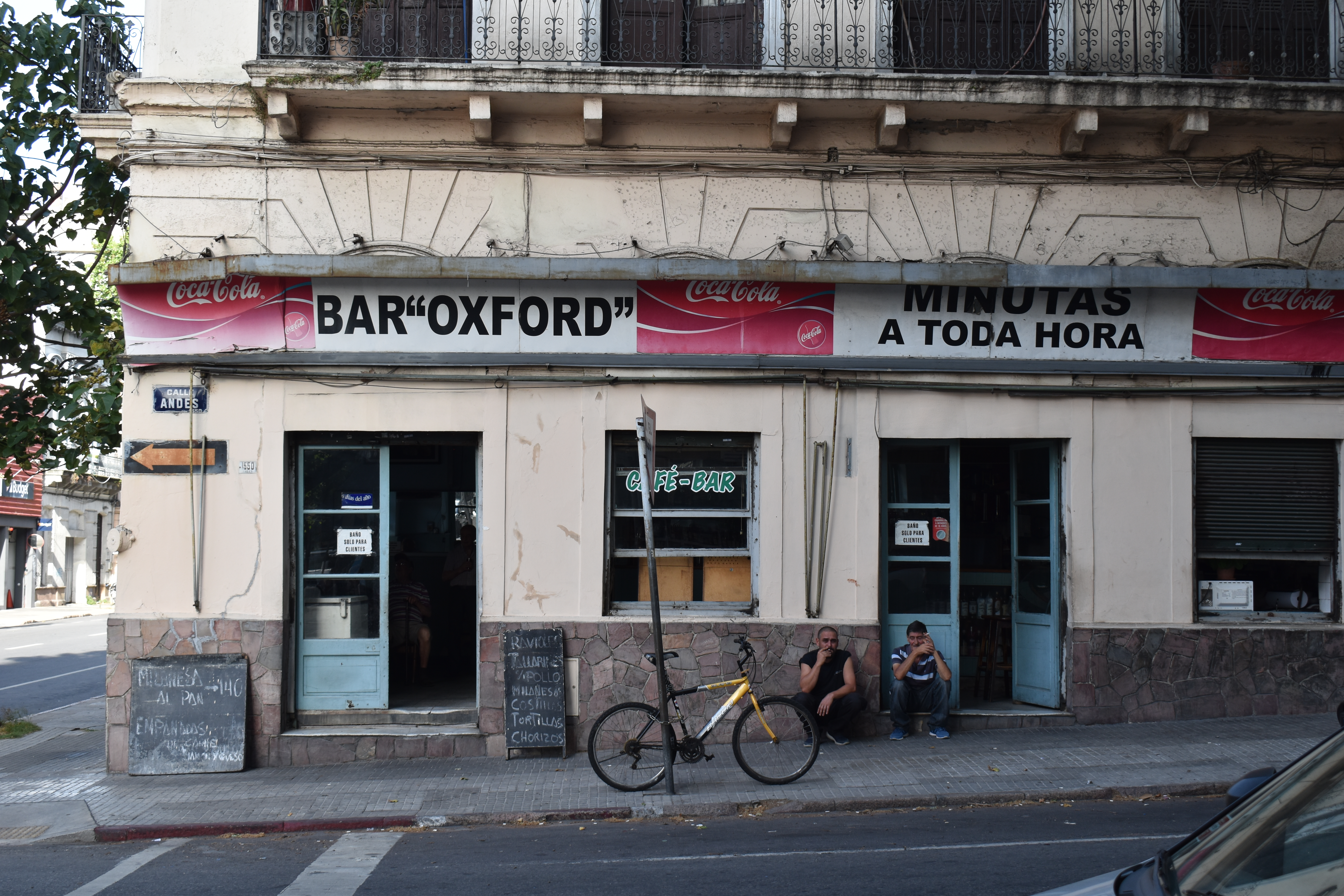
Bar Oxford, Montevideo

Filming of the series took place in Uruguay. In February 2021, shooting began in Montevideo. The Oxford Bar in the central area was depicted as the "Bar de los Taxistas" in the series. In March, filming began in Punta del Este.
