= Televisión Registrada =

Televisión Registrada, also known as TVR, is a television show that was produced by Diego Gvirtz's company Pensado para Televisión. The show debuted on June 5, 1999 on America TV and was hosted by humorists Fabian Gianola and Claudio Morgado for seven years.

TVR was a weekly newscast that deals with everything that happens on television, with a humorous touch. It also covered political events in Argentina and the world. Most people consider that its producer and editors have leftist leanings.

From 2011 to 2015, the show was hosted by Pablo Rago and journalist Gabriel Schultz and aired on Canal 9 on Saturdays at 10:00 pm.

== Origins ==
From 1998 to 2004, TVR was hosted by Morgado and Gianola. In 2005, the latter announced that he would take leave and there was a change of hosts. Jose Maria Listorti and Gabriel Schultz were hired to fill the positions, and till 2010 it was hosted by Sebastián Wainraich and Gabriel Schultz.

== Awards ==
=== Nominations ===
- 2013 Martín Fierro Awards
  - Best general interest
