= Kidnapping of Maria Àngels Feliu =

1992–1994 kidnapping in Catalonia, Spain

- Maria Àngels Feliu (center) shortly after her release from captivity, surrounded by police officers and journalists in Girona, March 1994.
- Location: 42°10′N 2°29′E; Olot, Catalonia, Spain
- Date: November 20, 1992 – March 27, 1994
- Attack type: Kidnapping
- Perpetrators: Antoni Guirado; Ramon Ullastre; Montserrat Teixidor; Josep Lluís Paz García; Sebastià Comas Baroy
- Motive: Ransom

The kidnapping of Maria Àngels Feliu was a high-profile abduction that took place in Olot, Catalonia, Spain. Feliu, a Catalan pharmacist and daughter of a local industrialist, was held captive for 492 days between 20 November 1992 and 27 March 1994 and then was liberated without physical injury but with long-term psychological trauma and PSTD. It remains the longest non-terrorist kidnapping in Spain.

She was the daughter of the owner of the textile company Hijos de J. Bassols S.A., commonly known as Bassols, a prestigious linen and home-fabric manufacturer founded in the 18th century. The Feliu family was considered well-off in Olot, a fact that reportedly motivated the kidnappers to kidnap her and ask for a ransom.

== Kidnapping ==
On the evening of 20 November 1992, after closing her pharmacy in Olot and having a drink with her sister, Feliu was ambushed by three or four people in an underground car park and forced into a car. She was transported in the trunk of two different vehicles to Sant Pere de Torelló (Osona), where she was imprisoned in a small, damp cupboard measuring roughly 1.6 metres high, 1.5 metres wide and 1.6 metres deep. The space contained only a mattress, and for the first seven weeks she lived without light. According to later testimony, she spent the early days without food.

At the time of her abduction, Feliu had three children aged between two and five. The case caused nationwide shock, and the Spanish media closely followed developments until her release. Early reports indicated that the kidnappers demanded a ransom of about 200 million pesetas.

After 492 days of captivity, her guard, Sebastià Comas Baroy (known as “Iñaki”), released her at a gas station in Lliçà de Vall (Vallès Oriental) with two 100-peseta coins and one 25-peseta coin. There, Feliu bought a Coca-Cola and called the authorities to announce her freedom.

== Trial and sentences ==
Five people were convicted for the kidnapping:

1. Antoni Guirado (former municipal policeman of Olot).
2. Ramon Ullastre (former security guard from Sant Pere de Torelló).
3. Montserrat Teixidor (Ramon's wife).
4. Josep Lluís Paz García (alias "Pato").
5. Sebastià Comas Baroy (alias "Iñaki"), the man who eventually freed her.

They received prison sentences ranging from five to seventeen years. On 20 November 2009, coinciding with the 17th anniversary of the kidnapping, Comas Baroy was released after serving more than eight years in prison.

== Legacy ==
The case has been described as one of the most shocking crimes in modern Catalonia. It has been covered in numerous books, documentaries and podcasts, including Carles Porta's 2021 book La farmacèutica and the audio series El segrest on Catalunya Ràdio.
