= The Rescue: The Weight of the World =

2023 drama film

- Directed by: Daniela Goggi
- Written by: Daniela Goggi; Andrea Garrote
- Starring: Rodrigo de la Serna
- Cinematography: Fernando Lockett
- Music by: Pablo Borghi
- Release date: September 2, 2023 (Venice)
- Countries: Argentina; United States
- Language: Spanish

The Rescue: The Weight of the World (Spanish: El rapto) is a 2023 political thriller film co-written and directed by Daniela Goggi. Based on the best-selling novel El Salto de Papá by Martín Sivak, it had its world premiere in the Orizzonti section at the 80th Venice International Film Festival and was later screened as a Special Presentation at the 48th Toronto Film Festival. It premiered on Paramount+ on 3 November 2023.

== Cast ==
- Rodrigo de la Serna as Julio Levy
- Julieta Zylberberg as Silvia
- Jorge Marrale as Elías Levy
- Germán Palacios as Miguel Levy
- Andrea Garrote as Alicia

== Awards ==
The film won three Argentine Academy of Cinematography Arts and Sciences Awards, for best adapted screenplay, best art direction and best sound.
