= The Delinquents (2023 film) =

2023 Argentine heist comedy-drama film by Rodrigo Moreno

- Promotional release poster
- Spanish: Los delincuentes
- Directed by: Rodrigo Moreno
- Written by: Rodrigo Moreno
- Produced by: Ezequiel Borovinsky
- Starring: Daniel Elías; Esteban Bigliardi
- Cinematography: Alejo Maglio; Inés Duacastella
- Edited by: Manuel Ferrari; Nicolás Goldbart; Rodrigo Moreno
- Production companies: Wanka Cine; Les Films Fauves; Sancho&Punta; Jirafa Films; Jaque Productora; Rizoma Films
- Distributed by: MUBI; MACO Cine; Magnolia Pictures International
- Release dates: 18 May 2023 (Cannes); 26 October 2023 (Argentina)
- Running time: 190 minutes
- Countries: Argentina; Brazil; Chile; Luxembourg
- Language: Spanish
- Box office: $313,531

The Delinquents (Spanish: Los delincuentes) is a 2023 heist comedy-drama film written and directed by Rodrigo Moreno. Starring Daniel Elías and Esteban Bigliardi, it is a co-production between Argentina, Brazil, Chile and Luxembourg.

It had its world premiere in the Un Certain Regard section at the 76th Cannes Film Festival on 18 May 2023. It was chosen as the Argentine entry for Best International Feature Film at the 96th Academy Awards.

== Synopsis ==
Morán works as a clerk in a bank in Buenos Aires. He is as good as invisible to his colleagues. Over dinner with his colleague Román, Morán tells him that he stole exactly $650,000, which is exactly double what he would have made until his retirement. He plans to turn himself in, but not before offering Román to split the money if he agrees to hide it for the duration of his incarceration.

== Cast ==
- Daniel Elías as Morán
- Esteban Bigliardi as Román
- Margarita Molfino as Norma
- Germán de Silva as Del Toro and Garrincha
- Laura Paredes as Laura Ortega
- Mariana Chaud as Marianela
- Cecilia Rainero as Morna
- Javier Zoro Sutton as Ramón
- Gabriela Saidón as Flor
- Adriana Aizemberg as Bank Client

== Production ==
The Delinquents was produced by Ezequiel Borovinsky of Wanka Cine (Argentina), co-produced by Les Films Fauves (Luxembourg), Sancho&Punta (Brazil), Jirafa Films (Chile), Jaque Productora (Argentina) and Rizoma Films (Argentina).

== Release ==
The film was selected to be screened in the Un Certain Regard section of the 76th Cannes Film Festival, where it had its world premiere on 18 May 2023. In April 2023, Magnolia Pictures International acquired worldwide and US sales rights to the film. In May 2023, following the film's Cannes premiere, MUBI negotiated a deal to theatrically release the film in North America, United Kingdom, Latin America and other countries. It was also invited to the 27th Lima Film Festival in the Competition fiction section, where it was screened on 10 August 2023. Following screenings at the 2023 Toronto International Film Festival and 2023 New York Film Festival. It was also invited at the 28th Busan International Film Festival in 'World Cinema' section and was screened on 6 October 2023.

MUBI gave the film a limited theatrical release in the United States on 18 October 2023. The film was theatrically released in Argentina on 26 October 2023, distributed by MUBI in collaboration with MACO Cine.

== Reception ==
=== Critical response ===
On Rotten Tomatoes, the film holds an approval rating of 86% based on 73 reviews, with an average rating of 7.8/10. The site's critics consensus reads: "Breaking through the genre wall, The Delinquents is an astute existential heist movie that will reward patient viewers with a humorous fable about freedom." On Metacritic, the film has a weighted average score of 85 out of 100, based on twenty critic reviews, indicating "universal acclaim".

Reviewing the film following its Cannes premiere, Peter Bradshaw of The Guardian awarded it five out of five stars, predicting it to be a future "cult classic".

=== Accolades ===
Award	Date of ceremony	Category	Recipient(s)	Result	Ref.
Cannes Film Festival	26 May 2023	Un Certain Regard	Rodrigo Moreno	Nominated	
Chicago International Film Festival	22 October 2023	Gold Hugo	The Delinquents	Nominated	
Chicago International Film Festival	22 October 2023	Silver Hugo	The Delinquents	Won	
Film Fest Gent	21 October 2023	Grand Prix for Best Film	The Delinquents	Won	
Lima Film Festival	18 August 2023	Best Picture	The Delinquents	Nominated	
Lima Film Festival	18 August 2023	Best Director	Rodrigo Moreno	Won	
Lima Film Festival	18 August 2023	International Critics' Jury Award - Best Film	The Delinquents	Won	
Lima Film Festival	18 August 2023	APRECI Award for Best Film - Honorable Mention	The Delinquents	Won	
Platino Awards	20 April 2024	Best Ibero-American Film	The Delinquents	Nominated	
Platino Awards	20 April 2024	Best Screenplay	Rodrigo Moreno	Nominated	
Platino Awards	20 April 2024	Best Cinematography	Inés Duacastella, Alejo Maglio	Nominated	
Platino Awards	20 April 2024	Best Film Editing	Manuel Ferrari, Nicolás Goldbart, Rodrigo Moreno	Nominated	
San Sebastián International Film Festival	30 September 2023	Zabaltegi-Tabakalera Prize	The Delinquents	Nominated	

== See also ==
- Hardly a Criminal, 1949 Argentine film with similar plot
- List of Argentine films of 2023
- List of submissions to the 96th Academy Awards for Best International Feature Film
- List of Argentine submissions for the Academy Award for Best International Feature Film
