= Santiago Korovsky =

Argentine actor and director

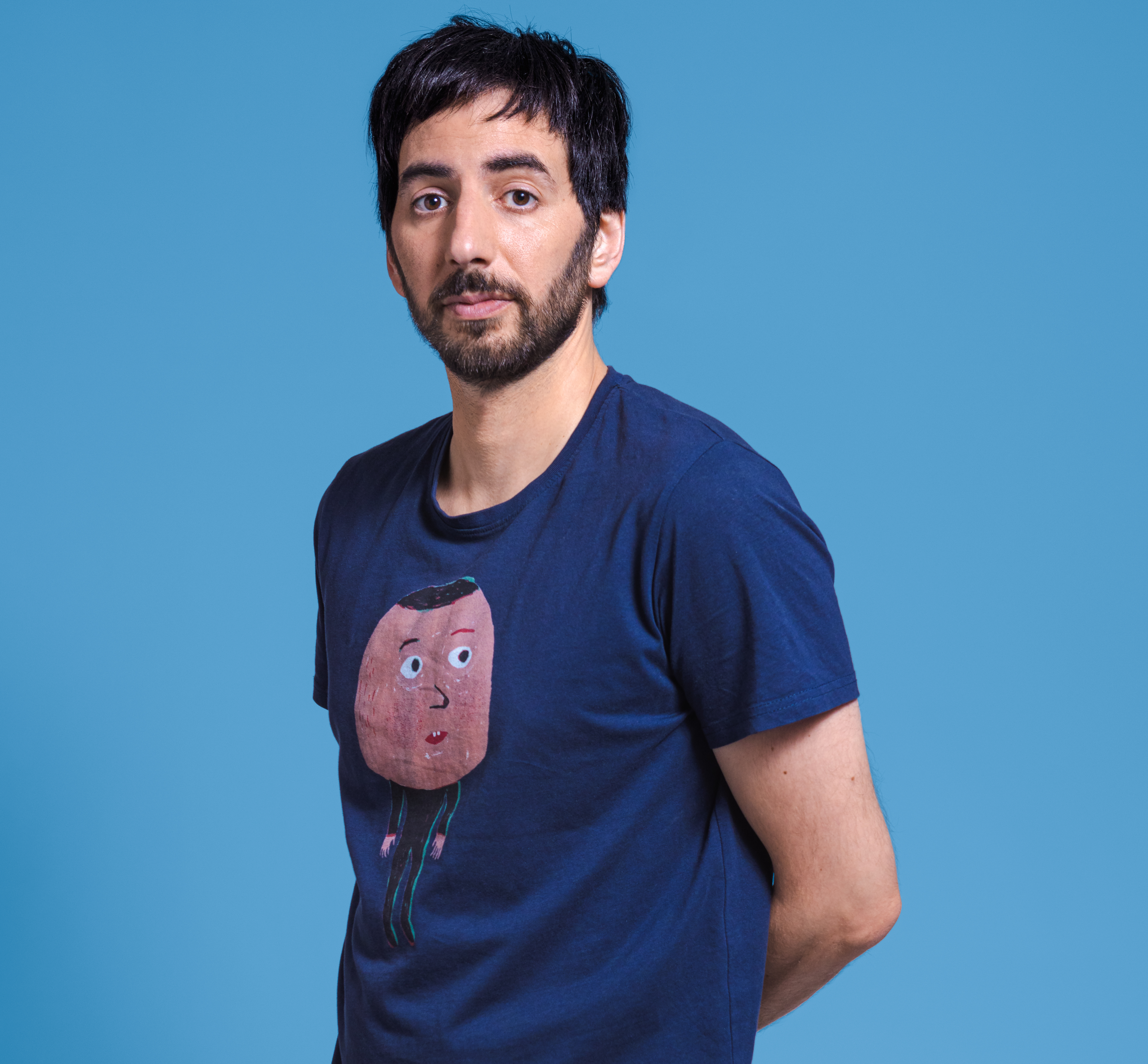
- Korovsky in 2022
- Born: 26 February 1985 (age 41); Buenos Aires, Argentina
- Education: University of Buenos Aires
- Occupations: Actor, director, screenwriter
- Years active: 2012–present

Santiago Korovsky (born 26 February 1985) is an Argentine actor, director and screenwriter.

== Early life ==
Korovsky was born on 26 February 1985 in Buenos Aires into a Jewish Argentine family. His mother was a schoolteacher and writer. His uncle, Ernesto Korovsky, is a screenwriter known for his work in telenovelas such as Son amores, Graduados and Sos mi vida.

He studied social communication at the University of Buenos Aires Faculty of Social Sciences. In his youth he played basketball at Club Náutico Hacoaj, dropping out of the programme when he turned 23.

== Career ==
Korovsky began his career as a filmmaker with the documentary Salir a escena (2012), which earned critical acclaim and numerous awards.

Korovsky further expanded his filmography with short films such as Pasión oriental, El año pasado en Mardelplá, and Myriam y Mauricio, as well as the web series Algo de Carlos.

In addition to directing, Korovsky established himself as an actor, appearing in productions such as Casi feliz, Porno y helado, El reino, Tiempo libre, and Periodismo Total.

Korovsky achieved his greatest success with the Netflix comedy División Palermo (in English, "Community Squad"), which premiered in 2023 to both audience and critical acclaim. The series became a cultural phenomenon in Argentina, spending five consecutive weeks in the country's Top 10. It earned numerous accolades, including the International Emmy for Best Comedy and seven Cóndor de Plata Awards, among them Best Comedy Series, Best Direction, Best Lead Actor, and Best Original Screenplay. The show also received a Premio Sur for Best Fictional Series and a Platino Award for Best Series Actor.

In December 2023, he was declared a "Distinguished Personality" of Buenos Aires by the city's legislature.

== Filmography ==
Year	Title	Role	Notes
2012	Salir a escena	—N/a	Director and producer
2013	El año pasado en Mardelplá		Short film; actor and director
2014	Tiempo libre	Carlos	Web series
2017	Pasión oriental	Felipe	Short film; actor, screenwriter and director
2017	El Galán de Venecia	Carlos	Web series
2018	Mi obra maestra	Mateo	
2018	All Inclusive	Marcos	
2019	Barrilete cósmico	Marcos	Web series
2020	Casi feliz	Sombrilla	Web series
2021	El reino	Ramiro Calderale	
2022	Porno y helado	Juan Cruz "Spider" Vieira	Guest appearance
2023	División Palermo	Felipe	Actor, director and producer
