= Ana García Blaya =

Argentine film director

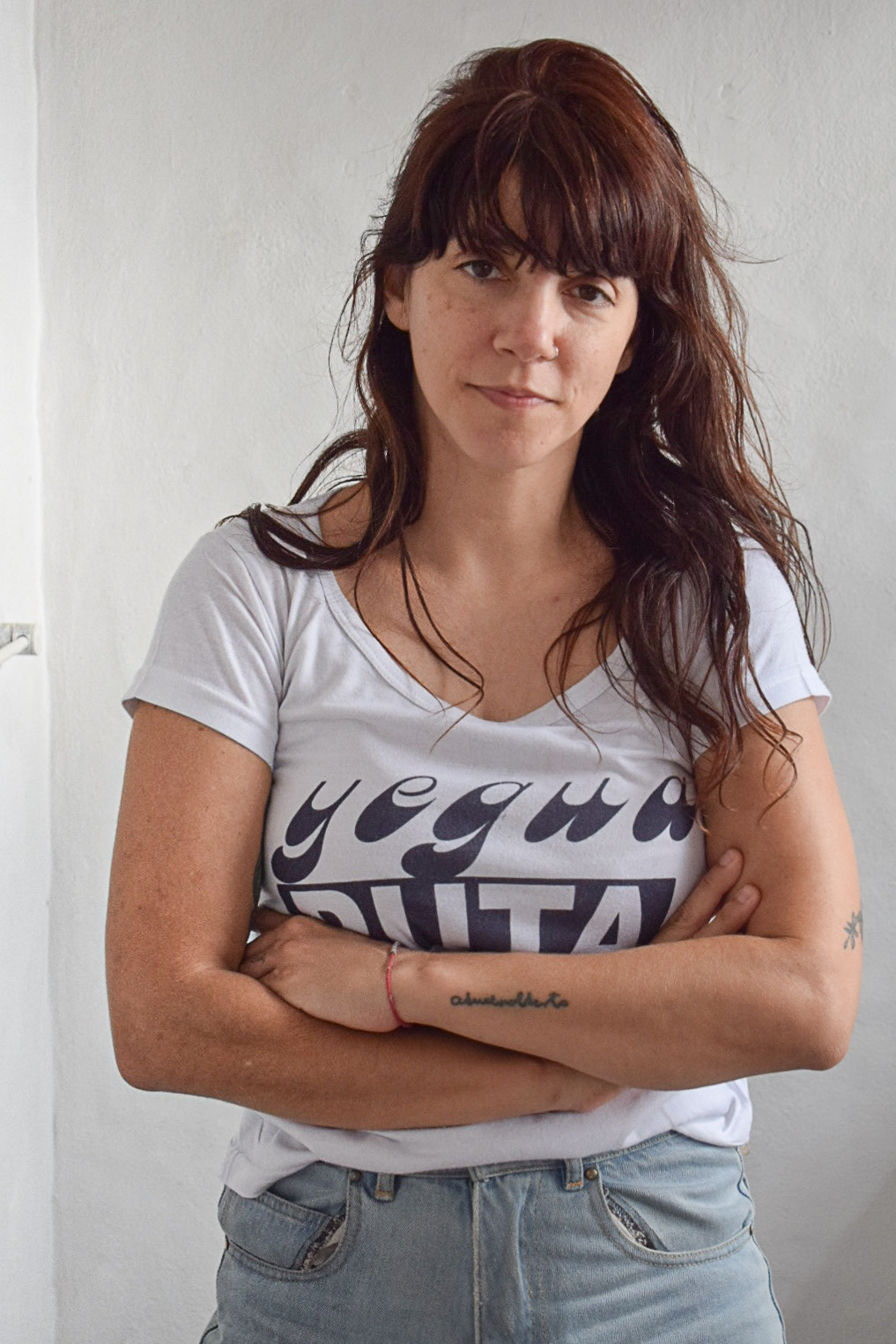
- (2021)
- Born: November 18, 1979 (age 46); Buenos Aires, Argentina
- Education: University of Buenos Aires
- Occupation: Film director
- Notable work: La Uruguaya

Ana García Blaya (born, Buenos Aires, November 18, 1979) is an Argentine film director.

== Biography ==
She studied Communication Sciences at the University of Buenos Aires (UBA). In 2015 she began working as a screenwriter with Pablo Solarz and in 2017, she was the winner of the National Institute of Cinema and Audiovisual Arts (INCAA) competition.

In 2019, she premiered her first film, Las buenas intenciones, which participated in the Toronto International Film Festival, San Sebastián International Film Festival, and Mar del Plata International Film Festival.

In 2022, she won the award for best direction in the international competition of the Mar del Plata International Film Festival with her second feature film, La Uruguaya, based on the novel of the same name by Pedro Mairal. This is the first production of Orsai Audiovisuales. To carry out the production of the film, thousands of people collectively organized to finance it and thus become "producing partners", making aesthetic and artistic decisions and participating in the entire process from the very beginning.

== See also ==
- Silver Condor Award for Best First Film
- 24th Busan International Film Festival
- 2019 Toronto International Film Festival
