= Martín Sivak =

Argentine journalist and writer

Martín Sivak is an Argentine journalist and author. His non-fiction books include works on the Bolivian Presidents Juan José Torres, Hugo Banzer and Evo Morales.

== Books ==
- Evo Morales: The Extraordinary Rise of the First Indigenous President of Bolivia (2010), Palgrave Macmillan.
- Jefazo: Retrato Intimo De Evo Morales (2008)
- El Doctor: Biografia No Autorizada de Mariano Grondona (2005), Aguilar. Biography of Mariano Grondona
- El dictador elegido: Biografía no autorizada de Hugo Banzer Suárez (2001), Plural Editores.
- El Asesinato De Juan José Torres: Banzer Y El Mercosur De La Muerte (1997), Ediciones Colihue SRL.
