= The Uruguayan =

The Uruguayan is a 2022 film directed by Ana García Blaya. It is produced by the Orsai Community (Comunidad Orsai in Spanish) led by Argentine author Hernán Casciari and Christian «Chiri» Basilis. It's the film adaptation of Pedro Mairal's "The Uruguayan" novel published in 2016, which achieved remarkable commercial success.

The film was financed through crowdfunding.

== Plot ==
The film tells the story of Lucas Pereyra, an Argentine author who travels to Uruguay for the day to buy US dollars with an advance he received for a book that he hadn't yet delivered. In Montevideo he agreed to secretly meet Magalí Guerra, based on fond memories of a prior visit. His plans don't go as expected.

== Production ==
To finance the film production, the Community released six thousand bonds at a unit price of 100 dollars each, and all members were allowed to buy up to 200 bonds each, thus becoming associate producers. The film profits will be distributed proportionally with all associate producers based on their number of bonds. All bonds were purchased within the first two months, and the film was fully financed before any other production first steps, including producer, film director or any other staff was employed or selected.

Community Orsai launched at the start of the production a website and a mobile app to which only associate producers and staff could log in; in it, creative discussions take place, creative polls are run, and associate producers can join video calls where staff discuss production topics, such art direction, script, and finance.

There is a weekly podcast featuring interviews, production news featuring cast members, and live streaming sessions with the staff. Frequently associate producers can join video calls via Zoom between staff and cast, and associate producers were allowed to join the production as extras during the shooting, furthering the unique production approach to this film.

== Staff ==
Ana García Blaya is the film director. She has received numerous accolades for her first work Las buenas intenciones, having received awards at film festivals such as La Habana, Toronto and San Sebastián. The director asked to join the production in the same way that associate producers did, with her fees being paid fully in movie bonds.

Filming took place in Buenos Aires and Montevideo, the same locations as in the book the film is based on.

An associate producer set up the contact with cinematographer César Charlone who joined Florencia Mamberti as cinematographer for the scenes shot in Uruguay.

The main cast members were selected via an open casting process among the Orsai Community, featuring web voting based on videos posted in Instagram. After multiple rounds of casting, 9 couples were chosen as finalists. A real-time voting via the Orsai app selected Sebastián Arzeno and Fiorella Bottaioli as main leads.

== Cast ==
- Sebastián Arzeno as Lucas Pereyra.
- Fiorella Bottaioli as Magalí Guerra.
- Gustavo Garzón as Enzo.
- Jazmín Stuart as Catalina.
- Josefina Gali as Lara.
