= Andrea Frigerio =

Argentine actress (born 1961)

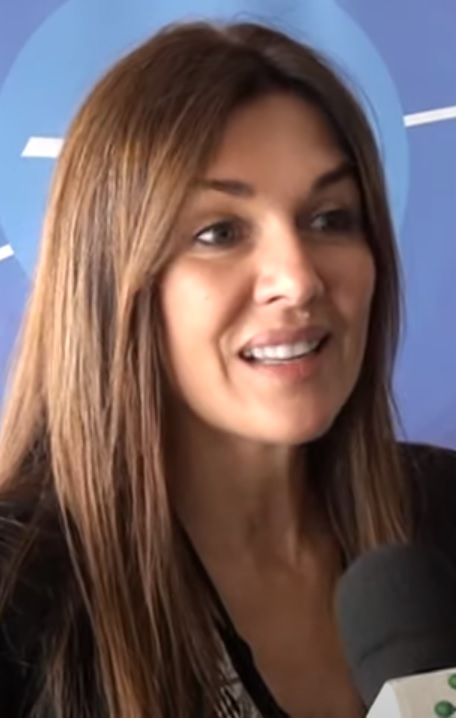
- Frigerio in 2014
- Born: Andrea Luisa Mitchelstein; August 30, 1961 (age 64); Buenos Aires
- Years active: 1989-present
- Notable work: Belleza Emocional, Argentina, tierra de amor y venganza, The Distinguished Citizen, The Last Runway

Andrea Luisa Mitchelstein, better known as Andrea Frigerio (born August 30, 1961 in Buenos Aires) is an Argentine actress, television presenter, former model and author.

== Career ==
She began her professional career as a model. In 1989, she began working as a television presenter, leading "Twelve plus one". In 1996 she participated in a segment of Videomatch, a program run by Marcelo Tinelli, running the hidden cameras. In 1998, Mitchelstein did a prerecorded program, "Viva la Diferencia", a game program that was a success.

As a television actress, she was one of the leads on the successful humor program, broadcast by Telefe during 2001 and 2002, with Guillermo Francella. In 2003 she made special appearances on the comedy Son Amores, and made appearances on the comedy Los Roldán in 2004 and 2005. In the theater, she played in various works, such as "Una Eva y Dos Salames", Money Money, Taxi and others. In 2007, she began working on the broadcast channel, America TV, as host of a question and answer show called "Do you know more than a 5th grader?". In 2007, she hosted every morning of "Hello America" on the Fox Sports channel. In 2009, she made a special appearance on the comedy, The Successful Pells, broadcast by Telefe.

Andrea was the face of several beauty brands for some time.

In 2019 she launched her first book Belleza Emocional (Emotional Beauty) and starred on Argentina, tierra de amor y venganza (Argentina, Land of Love and Revenge, sometimes shortened as "ATAV") where she played the main villain Madama Ivonne.

== Featured Jobs ==
- Doce más uno (1989)
- Despertar al país (1991)
- Desfiles Roberto Giordano (1994)
- Videomatch (1996)
- Viva la Diferencia (1998)
- Al que le toca, le toca (2001)
- Poné a Francella (2001 - 2002)
- Mar del Plata Moda Show (2002)
- Una Eva y dos Salames (2003)
- Bingo con Rodolfo Ranni (2003)
- Money Money (2004)
- Los Roldán (2004 - 2005)
- Taxi (2005)
- ¿Sabes más que un chico de 5 grado? (2007)
- Hola América (since 2007)
- Los Exitosos Pells (2009)
- The Distinguished Citizen (2016)
- Desearás al hombre de tu hermana (2017)
- Rojo (2018)
- My Masterpiece (2018)
- The Last Runway (2018)
- Solo el Amor (2018)
- Argentina, tierra de amor y venganza (2019)
- The Extortion (2023)
- Amor sin sentido (2023)
