= Pablo Rago =

Argentine actor (born 1972)

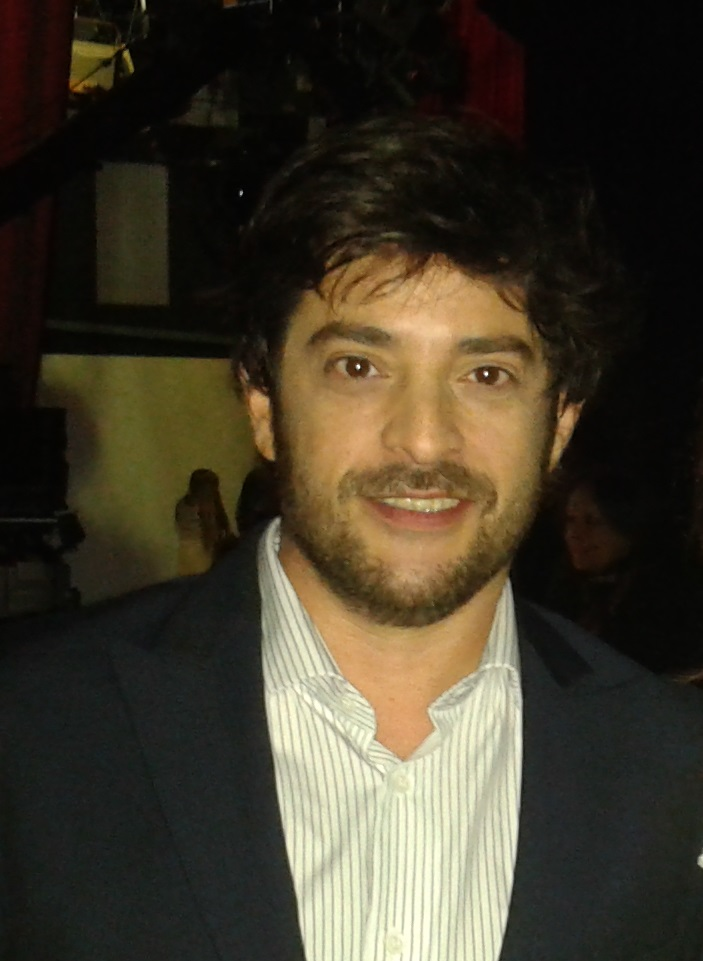
- Rago in 2014
- Born: September 24, 1972 (age 53); Buenos Aires
- Occupations: Actor; Theatre director
- Years active: 1985 - present

Pablo Rago (Spanish pronunciation: [ˈpaβlo ˈraɣo]; born September 24, 1972, in Buenos Aires) is an Argentine actor. He has acted in the films The Official Story (as a child actor) and The Secret in Their Eyes; both Argentine films have won the Academy Award for Best Foreign Language Film, and he has acted in many other films and productions.

== Works ==
=== Film ===
- 1978: Las travesuras de Cepillo
- 1982: Últimos días de la víctima (Bruno Külpe)
- 1983: Gracias por el fuego (Ramón Budiño niño)
- 1985: The Official Story (son of Enrique)
- 1995: La pasión de Mitjans
- 1996: El mundo contra mí
- 1999: El mar de Lucas (Facundo Denevi)
- 2001: Déjala correr (René)
- 2002: Apasionados (Roberto)
- 2004: Próxima salida (Daniel)
- 2005: El buen destino (David)
- 2007: La mujer rota (Juan)
- 2008: Yo soy sola (Pablo)
- 2008: La leyenda (Juan Manuel Migliardi)
- 2009: 100% lucha, el amo de los clones
- 2009: The Secret in Their Eyes (Morales)
- 2009: La última vuelta (under production)
- 2010: Manuel Belgrano (Manuel Belgrano)
- 2013: Underdogs (Capi)
- 2015: No Film
- 2017: You Only Live Once
- 2020: The Heist of the Century
- 2023: The Extortion

=== Theater ===
==== Actor ====
- 1995: Yepeto
- 1998: Perla
- 1999: La reina de la belleza
- 2001: Pingüinos
- 2002: Hombre y superhombre
- 2003: Romeo y Julieta
- 2004: La prueba
- 2006: Extraña pareja
- 2008: Extraña pareja

==== Director ====
- 2006: Extraña pareja

=== Television ===
- 1977: Mi hermano Javier
- 1977: 13 historias de amor (Canal 13)
- 1979: Novia de vacaciones (Canal 13)
- 1980: Dónde pueda quererte (Canal 11)
- 1980: Rosa de lejos (ATC)
- 1981: Especiales de Alejandro Doria (ATC)
- 1984: Historia de un trepador (Canal 13)
- 1986: Por siempre amigos (Canal 13)
- 1987-1990: Clave de sol (Canal 13)
- 1990-1993: Amigos son los amigos (Telefé and Canal 9)
- 1994: Inconquistable corazón (Canal 9)
- 1994-1995: Alta comedia (Canal 9)
- 1995: Por siempre mujercitas (Canal 9)
- 1996: Sueltos (Canal 13)
- 1997: Los hermanos Pérez Conde (Canal 9)
- 1998: Gasoleros (Canal 13)
- 1999: El hombre (Canal 13)
- 2000: Primicias (Canal 13)
- 2001: Los buscas de siempre (Azul TV)
- 2002: Kachorra (Telefé)
- 2003: Resistiré (Telefe)
- 2004: Mosca y Smith (Telefé)
- 2005: Conflictos en red (Telefé)
- 2005: Algo habrán hecho por la historia argentina, playing Mariano Moreno (Telefe)
- 2006: Vientos de agua (Canal 13)
- 2006: Mujeres asesinas (Canal 13)
- 2008: Mujeres asesinas (Italia)
- 2008: Todos contra Juan (Telefe)/(América)
- 2009: Enseñame a vivir (Canal 13)
- 2010: Botineras (Telefé)
- 2011–present: Television Registrada (Canal 9) (co-host)
