= División Palermo =

Argentine TV series (2023-2025)

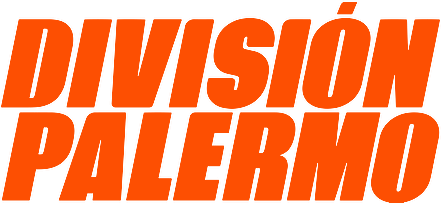
- Spanish: División Palermo
- Genre: Comedy
- Created by: Santiago Korovsky
- Written by: Santiago Korovsky; Ignacio Sánchez Mestre; Florencia Percia; Martín Garabal; Mariana Wainstein; Ignacio Gaggero; Martina López Robol
- Directed by: Santiago Korovsky; Diego Núñez Irigoyen
- Starring: Santiago Korovsky; Daniel Hendler; Pilar Gamboa; Marcelo Subiotto; Martín Garabal; Charo López
- Country of origin: Argentina
- Original language: Spanish
- No. of seasons: 2
- No. of episodes: 14

Production
- Producers: Nicolás Goldar Parodi; Analía Castro; Diego Copello
- Production location: Buenos Aires, Argentina
- Cinematography: Román Kasseroller
- Editors: Nicolás Goldbart; Ana Remón
- Production companies: K&S Films

Original release
- Network: Netflix
- Release: 17 February 2023 – 17 July 2025

Community Squad (Spanish: División Palermo) is an Argentine comedy television series created by Santiago Korovsky. Produced by K&S Films and distributed by Netflix, the series centers around a group of people who represent social minorities and are hired to form a neighbourhood protection guard.

The series criticizes tokenism in organizations through a screenplay that resignifies offensive humor to place judgment on companies and governments that discriminate against minorities.

The title of the series is taken from the Buenos Aires neighbourhood of Palermo. In September 2024, it was announced as a nominee for the 52nd International Emmy Awards. It finally won the award in November of the same year.

== Premise ==
A marketing campaign to clean up the image of the metropolitan police security forces creates a division of the Urban Guard composed of minorities. The recruiters (Subiotto and Hendler, the latter with a prosthetic arm) select a trans woman (Licciardi), a girl in a wheelchair (Gamboa), a blind man (Bogarín), an elderly deaf man (Marticorena), a Little person (Cuevas), a Bolivian immigrant (Condori Sangalli) and the protagonist Felipe Rosenfeld (Korovsky), because he is Jewish.

== Cast ==
=== Main ===
- Santiago Korovsky as Felipe Rozenfeld
- Daniel Hendler as Miguel Rossi
- Pilar Gamboa as Sofía Vega
- Marcelo Subiotto as Julio García Reynoso
- Martín Garabal as Esteban Vargas
- Charo López as Paloma Palo Gutiérrez
- Julio Marticorena as Bernardo Romero Zimmerman
- Valeria Licciardi as Vivianne
- Facundo Bogarín as Edgardo Torres
- Nilda Sindaco as Betty
- Hernán Cuevas as Johnny De Moraes
- Renato Condorí Sangalli as Mario Quispe Gonzales

=== Recurring and guest ===
- Carlos Belloso as Dogo
- Alan Sabbagh as Gabriel Kermann
- Iair Said as Ariel Kermann
- Fabián Arenillas as Daniel Rozenfeld
- Gabriela Izcovich as Adriana Rozenfeld
- Agustín Rittano as Franco Palacios
- Sergio Prina as Sergio Núñez
- Camila Peralta as Paula Pauli Martínez
- Mike Amigorena as Luis Mansardi
- Daniela Korovsky as Julieta Rozenfeld
- Valeria Lois as Carolina Pozzo
- Rafael Spregelburd as Osvaldo
- Chang Sung Kim as Chino
- Sang Min Lee as Chang-Cho
- Alicia Labraga as Judith

== Reception ==
=== Critical response ===
Santiago García of Infobae wrote: ‘The series knows how to find a way to laugh with the minorities without disrespecting them. That humour that people no longer dare to make or that can often lead to someone being cancelled. There is something healthy and luminous in being able to recover those jokes about things that affect us and that we live with on a daily basis. The real integration is that everyone can be part of the comedy. And most importantly, it is a really funny comedy’.

Mikel Zorrilla of Espinof highlighted ‘[the] ability [of the series] to play with different archetypes that in another time would have served as the basis for jokes that did not go beyond the offensive -and the particular ability of the comedian in question to put his personal stamp on them’.

Alejandro Modarelli, from Página/12, says that División Palermo poses ‘a social and cultural debate on freedom of speech’ in whose plot the Urban Guard is ‘made up of freaks hired in the neoliberal city as cosmetic instruments of the actual repressive policies’. The writer points out the intention of reflecting ‘the astuteness of the right wing politicians when they claim to be liberal, in its eagerness to hide difference under an export carpet or to instrument it, uncritically, as objects of consumption in the cultural markets’.

=== Accolades ===
Community Squad received 20 nominations for the Silver Condor, the Argentine most important awards for films and television series. It won 7 of them, including "Best Comedy and/or Musical Series", "Best Director" and "Best Original Screenplay".

It also received 4 nominations for the Platino Awards, the most relevant Ibero-American awards; and won an International Emmy Awards as Best Comedy Series.

Community Squad received 5 nominations for the 2024 Premios Aura.
