= Benjamín Naishtat =

Argentine film director and screenwriter

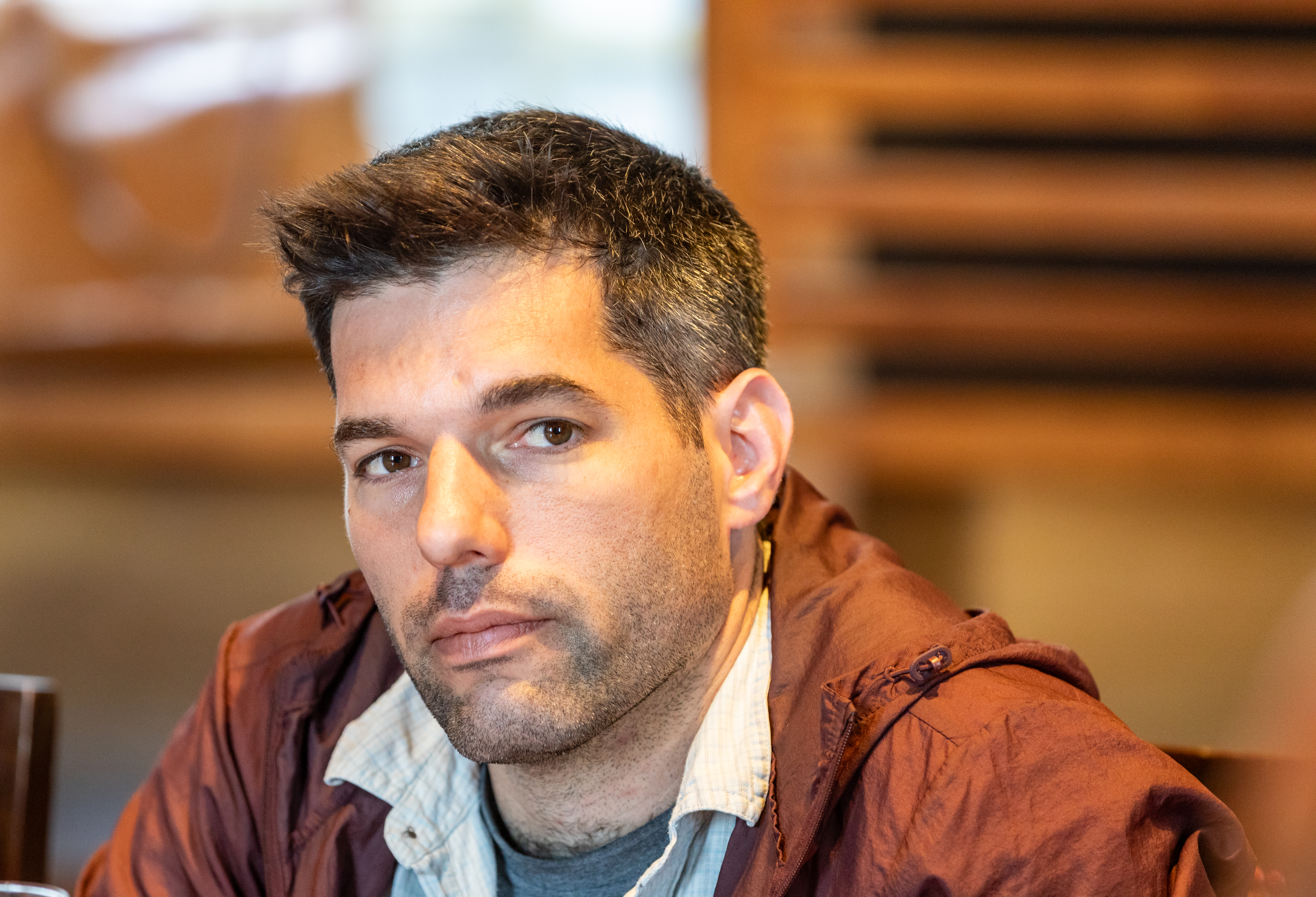
- Naishtat in 2023
- Born: 1986 (age 39–40); Buenos Aires, Argentina
- Years active: 2000s–present

Benjamín Naishtat (born 1986) is an Argentine film director and screenwriter.

His debut feature film History of Fear (Historia del miedo) premiered in 2014 at the 64th Berlin International Film Festival.

He followed up with The Movement (El movimiento), which premiered at the 68th Locarno Film Festival in 2015.

In 2018 his film Rojo premiered at the 2018 Toronto International Film Festival. The film, about the months leading up to the 1976 Argentine coup d'état, won awards from the San Sebastián International Film Festival, the Argentine Film Critics Association, and the Premios Sur.

Puan, co-directed with María Alché, premiered at the 71st San Sebastián International Film Festival in 2023.

His newest film, Glaxo, is slated to premiere at the 2026 Toronto International Film Festival.

== Filmography ==
- History of Fear (Historia del miedo) - 2014
- The Movement (El movimiento) - 2015
- Rojo - 2018
- Puan - 2023
- Glaxo -2026
