= Rodrigo Moreno =

Argentine filmmaker (born 1972)

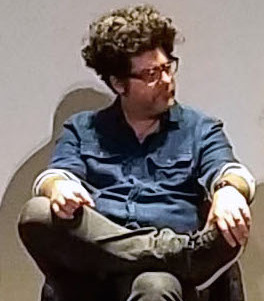
Rodrigo Moreno in 2019, at a screening of 'La Loi du marché'.

Rodrigo Moreno (born October 1972) is an Argentinian film director and screenwriter.

According to Joel Poblete, who writes for cinema magazine Mabuse, Moreno is one of the members of the so-called "New Argentine Cinema" which began c. 1998.

== Biography ==
Born in Buenos Aires, Moreno is the son of actors Adriana Aizenberg and Carlos Moreno. He studied cinema and graduated from the directing program at the Universidad del Cine, Buenos Aires, and has been teaching directing and screenplay writing there since 1996.

In 1993, he wrote and directed his first short film, Nosotros, which won best film at the Bilbao International Festival of Documentary and Short Films.

His 2006 film The Minder (Spanish: El Custodio) is the first film feature he directed alone. His 2011 film A Mysterious World premiered In Competition at the 61st Berlin International Film Festival and was nominated for the Golden Bear.

In February 2025, Moreno joined the competition jury at the 75th Berlin International Film Festival, presided over by Todd Haynes.

== Filmography ==
- Nosotros (1993) (Short: 8 min.)
- Mala época (1998) (co-directed)
- El descanso (2002) (co-directed)
- The Minder (2006)
- R.D. Kell's The signal (2007) TV film (co-directed)
- A Mysterious World (2011)
- Reimon (2012)
- The Delinquents (2023)

== Awards ==
Wins

- Mar del Plata Film Festival: FIPRESCI Prize Best Latin-American Film; for Mala época. For its original conception that combines various aspects of contemporary life expressing the young filmmakers point of view; Special Mention, for Mala época; 1998.
- Toulouse Latin America Film Festival: Audience Award; for Mala época; 1999.
- Sundance Film Festival: NHK Award, for The Minder (Latin America); 2005.
- Berlin International Film Festival: Alfred Bauer Prize, for El Custodio; 2006.
- Bogota Film Festival: Golden Precolumbian Circle; Best Director; Best Film; for El Custodio; 2006.
- Lleida Latin-American Film Festival: ICCI Screenplay Award, for El Descanso; 2003.
- Donostia-San Sebastián International Film Festival: Horizons Award; Special Mention; for El Custodio; 2006.
- Film Fest Gent: Grand Prix; for Los delincuentes; 2023.

Nominations

- Torino International Festival of Young Cinema: Prize of the City of Torino Best Film; International Feature Film Competition; for Mala época; 1998.
- Argentine Film Critics Association Awards: Silver Condor; Best First Film; for Mala época (2000).
- Buenos Aires International Festival of Independent Cinema: Best Film; for El Descanso; 2001.
- Argentine Film Critics Association Awards: Silver Condor; Best First Film; for El Descanso; (2003).
- Berlin International Film Festival: Golden Berlin Bear; for El Custodio; 2006.
