= Norberto's Deadline =

- Release poster
- Directed by: Daniel Hendler
- Written by: Daniel Hendler
- Produced by: Daniel Burman; Sebastian Aloi; Micaela Solé
- Starring: Fernando Amaral; César Troncoso; Eugenia Guerty; Roberto Suárez
- Cinematography: Arauco Hernández
- Edited by: Andrés Tambornino
- Music by: Maximiliano Silveira
- Production companies: Cordón Films; Aeroplano
- Release date: August 7, 2010 (Locarno International Film Festival)
- Running time: 89 minutes
- Countries: Uruguay; Argentina
- Language: Spanish

Norberto's Deadline (Spanish: Norberto apenas tarde) is a 2010 comedy-drama film written, co-produced and directed by Daniel Hendler in his directorial debut. It follows Norberto, who after being fired, tries his luck as a real estate agent, putting off telling his wife. His new boss recommends that he attend a personal assertiveness course to overcome his timidity and he starts studying acting at a beginners’ workshop. While preparing the 3-monthly show, while he fails in his endeavours to behave credibly towards his clients and his wife, what he does discover is a tremendous ability to lie to himself.

== Description ==
Uruguayan actor Daniel Hendler makes his feature filmmaking debut with this portrayal of Norberto (Fernando Amaral), a dissatisfied man who discovers a zest for acting and the theatre. Set in Hendler’s hometown of Montevideo, the film follows Norberto as his life is renewed by the discovery of an unknown talent.

Recently fired from his job at an airline, Norberto tries his hand at real estate. When the new boss criticizes his timidity and recommends that he attend a course in personal affirmation, Norberto opts for a theatre class instead and immediately discovers a passion for it. But he hides it from his wife and even begins lying to his peers. His attitude continues to harden until his wife leaves him. With his new-found liberty, this complex man must find a way to move forward.

Amaral’s portrayal of Norberto was noted for its realism, precision, and comedic timing. In one scene, Norberto attempts to sell an apartment occupied by an elderly couple whose children want them to leave. While showing the property to prospective tenants, he repeatedly directs the couple into the kitchen to keep them out of sight. Amaral’s performance combines comedic elements with a sympathetic portrayal of the situation.

Hendler knows the habits and quirks of actors inside out, and brings that authenticity to his story of a man in the process of becoming a performer. A film about the revelation of embracing one’s creativity, Norberto's Deadline also explores the complications of aspiring to achieve international success in a small country with few resources.

== Director ==
Daniel Hendler was born in Montevideo, Uruguay and is an actor, writer and director. He has acted in numerous Argentine productions, most notably in the films of Daniel Burman, including Waiting for the Messiah (2000), Every Stewardess Goes to Heaven (2002), Lost Embrace (2004) and Family Law (2006). He also made the short films Perro Perdiddo (co-director, 2002) and Cuarto de Hora (2004). Norberto's Deadline (2010) is his feature writing and directing debut.

== Accolades ==
The European premiere was in the Locarno International Film Festival, in the section Cineasti del Presente.

The movie won the award Televisión Española, in the section Cine en Construcción. It also participated in the 58th Edition 2010 of the San Sebastián International Film Festival, in the section Horizontes Latinos. San Sebastian (Donostia in Euskera) is traditionally one of the biggest events on the Latin American movie calendar. In addition to the titles screened in the Official Selection and Zabaltegi-New Directors, it brings a specific selection of films from Latin America, unreleased in Spain, and competing for the Horizontes Award, that carries a cash prize of 35.000 euros.

The North American premiere took place in the Toronto International Film Festival, at the Discovery programme.
