= Adriana Aizemberg =

Argentine actress (1938–2025)

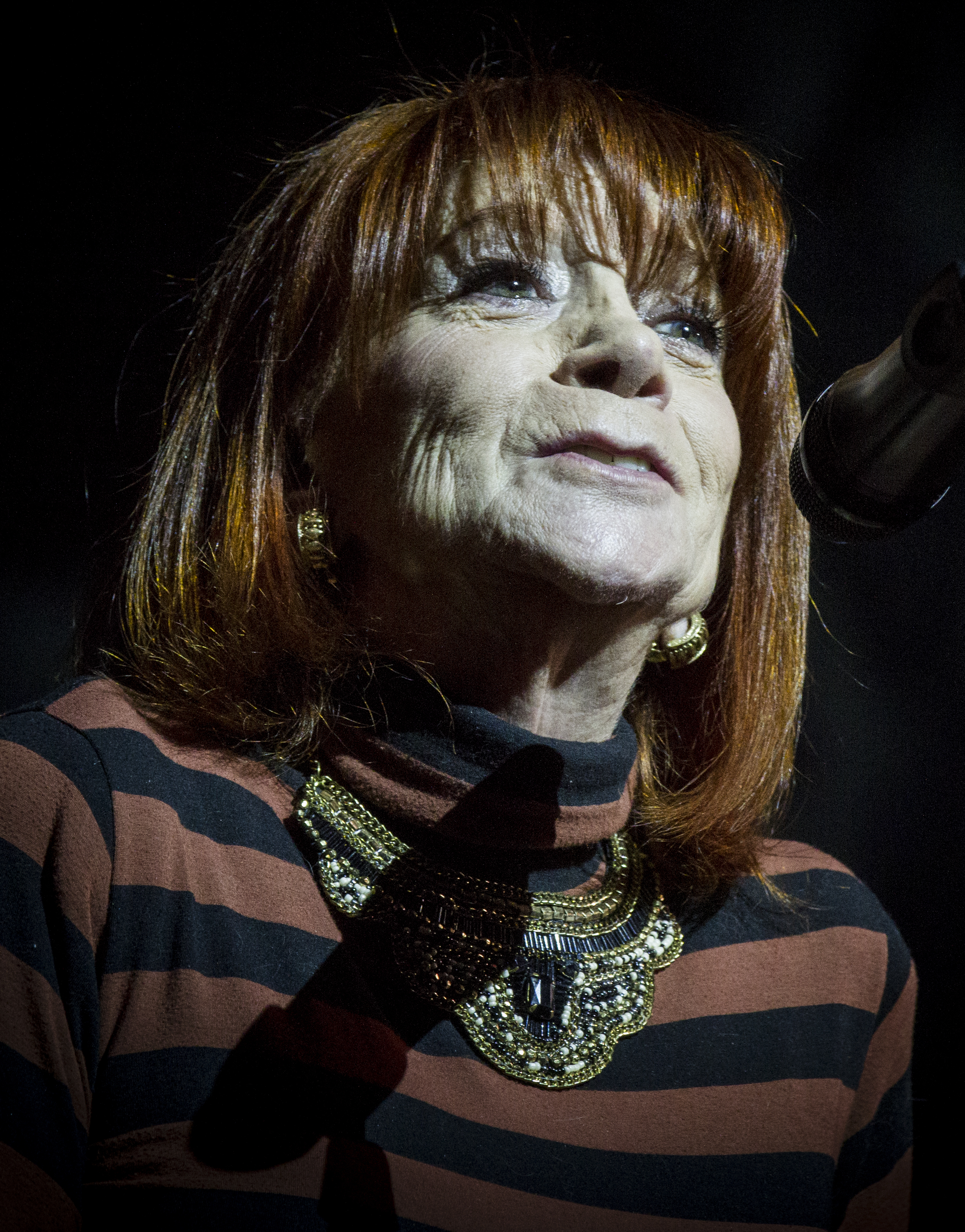
Aizenberg in 2017

Adriana Aizemberg (1 December 1938 – 29 September 2025) was an Argentine actress of stage and screen. Originally introduced to the arts through the Fray Mocho theater group in her youth, she began her professional acting career in theater productions in Buenos Aires. Aizemberg made her film debut in 1966 and went on to have a career in cinema, with her performances in Daniel Burman's Lost Embrace (2004).

== Early life ==
Adriana was born in Santa Fe on 1 December 1938. Her influence on art began when her father, a dentist, hosted a theater group, Teatro Popular Fray Mocho, in their house. Then, she moved to Buenos Aires to study at Escuela del Fray Mocho.

== Career ==
Her career began when she stepped in to replace a cast member in Historias para ser contadas, a production directed by Osvaldo Dragún. Following this, theater actress Lydé Lisant and San Telmo theater director Carlos Gorostiza recruited her to star in Eugene O'Neill's ¡Ah, soledad!.

Aizemberg appeared in film from 1966, making her debut in Todo sol es amargo. She returned to acting in film 9 years later, in La Raulito, directed by Lautaro Murúa. She also acted in 2004 Daniel Burman film Lost Embrace alongside Uruguayan actor Daniel Hendler, and in ''A través de tus ojos in the role of Nilda in 2006. In 2010, she returned to acting in theater by starring in El misterio de dar, a play directed by Griselda Gambaro at Teatro Nacional Cervantes.

== Death ==
Aizemberg died on 29 September 2025, at the age of 86.

== Personal life ==
She was married to actor Carlos Moreno. Their son is director Rodrigo Moreno.

== Partial filmography ==
=== Film ===
- El ABC del amor (1967)
- La Raulito (1975) aka Little Raoul
- Plata dulce (1982) aka Easy Money
- Sostenido en La menor (1986)
- Revancha de un amigo (1987)
- Mundo grúa (1999) aka Crane World
- La venganza (1999) aka The Revenge
- Buenos Aires 100 kilómetros (2004)
- 18-J (2004) "Mitzvah" Episode
- El Abrazo partido (2004) aka Lost Embrace
- Ropa sucia (2005)
- A través de tus ojos (2006)
- Derecho de familia (2006) aka Family Law
- Mazel Tov (2025)

=== Television ===
- El Mundo de Gasalla (1990) TV series
- Poliladron (1994-96) TV series also known as Cops and Robbers
- Vulnerables (1999) TV series
- 0800 no llames (2005) mini TV series
- Amas de Casa Desesperadas (2006-07) TV series
- Los exitosos Pells (2008) TV series
