= Emiliano Torres =

Argentine film director, screenplay writer and producer

Emiliano Torres (born December 5, 1971, in Buenos Aires) is an Argentine film director, screenplay writer and producer.

In 1991 he graduated from the Fundación Universidad del Cine of Buenos Aires and completed his degree in filmmaking, oriented towards directing. His generation was the first to graduate from institution.

Since 1996 he has been working as assistant director and screenwriter in many national and international films shot in South America and in Europe. In the last years he has worked with European film directors such as Marco Bechis, Miguel Courtois and Emanuele Crialese, than others.

El Invierno (The Winter) is his first feature film as a director.

== Filmography ==
Director

- The Winter (2016) a.k.a. El invierno

Writer

- The Winter (2016) a.k.a. El invierno
- Esperando al mesías (2000) a.k.a. Waiting for the Messiah
- Todas las azafatas van al cielo (2002) a.k.a. Every Stewardess Goes to Heaven
- Whisky Romeo Zulu (2004)

Cinematographer

- Muñeco (2003)

Assistant director

- Ejercicios de Memoria (2015)
- Los Inocentes (2013)
- Corazón de León (2013)
- Amor a mares (2012)
- Operación E (2012)
- Verdades Verdaderas, La vida de Estela (2011)
- Terraferma (2011)
- También la Lluvia (2010) a.k.a. Even the Rain
- A Woman (2010)
- Lucky Luke (2009)
- Papá por un día (2009)
- Nuevomondo (2006) a.k.a. Golden Door
- Géminis (2005)
- El Juego de la verdad (2004)
- Whisky Romeo Zulu (2004)
- Todas las azafatas van al cielo (2002) a.k.a. Every Stewardess Goes to Heaven
- Figli (2001)
- Gallito Ciego (2001)
- Esperando al mesías (2000) a.k.a. Waiting for the Messiah
- Río escondido (1999)
- Garage Olimpo (1999)
- Dibu 2: La venganza de Nasty (1998)
- Plaza de almas (1997)
- Moebius (1996)

Second director

- Moebius (1996)

== Awards ==
- Argentores Latinamerican Prize 2013: Best Film Screenplay for "El Invierno".
- Raymundo Gleyzer Award - Argentine Institute of Cinema: Best film project for "El Invierno" 2013.
- Opera Prima Award - Argentine Institute of Cinema: Best film project for "El Invierno" 2014.
- Special Jury Award / 64º San Sebastián International Film Festival - Official Selection.
- Best Film French Critics Award / Biarritz Film Festival - Official Selection.
- Best First Film / 38º International Film Festival La Habana, Cuba.
- Best Film / 1st Macao Film Festival.
- Film in Progress Award / Cinélatino Rencontres de Toulouse 2016.
- Special Award Ciné Plus / Cinélatino Rencontres de Toulouse 2016.
- Balance de Oro Award / Pantalla Pinamar 2017.
- Signis Award / Pantalla Pinamar 2017.
- DAC Award (Directores Argentinos Asociados), Graba 01, Mendoza, 2017.
- Asociación Críticos Argentinos Award, Festival Graba 01, Mendoza, 2017.
- Argentores Award, 2017.
- INCAA TV Award, 2017.
