= BD Cine =

BD Cine ("Burman Dubcovsky Cine") is a film production company in Buenos Aires, Argentina.

The firm was formed in 1995 by producer/director Daniel Burman and producer Diego Dubcovsky.

According to film critic Joel Poblete, who writes for Mabuse, a cinema magazine, Daniel Burman and Diego Dubcovsky are two of the members of the New Argentina Cinema which began c. 1998.

== Filmography ==
- Plaza de almas (1997)
- Un Crisantemo Estalla en Cinco Esquinas (1998)
- Garage Olimpo (1999)
- Esperando al Mesías (2000)
- Le Loup de la côte Ouest (2002)
- Todas Las Azafatas Van Al Cielo (2002)
- Nadar solo (2003)
- Lesbianas de Buenos Aires (2004)
- 18-J (2004)
- El Abrazo Partido (2004)
- The Motorcycle Diaries (2004)
- Como un avión estrellado (2005)
- Un Año sin amor (2005)
- Chicha tu madre (2006)
- Derecho de Familia (2006)
- Tesis sobre un homicidio (2013)
