= Todas las azafatas van al cielo =

2002 Argentine/Spanish comedy drama film

- Theatrical release poster
- Directed by: Daniel Burman
- Written by: Daniel Burman; Emiliano Torres
- Produced by: Pablo Bossi; Pedro D'Angelo; Diego Dubcovsky; José María Morales
- Starring: Alfredo Casero; Ingrid Rubio; Emilio Disi; Valentina Bassi; Norma Aleandro
- Cinematography: Ramiro Civita
- Edited by: Alejandro Chomski; Ana Díaz Epstein; Miguel Pérez
- Music by: Víctor Reyes
- Production company: BD Cine
- Distributed by: Buena Vista International
- Release dates: March 21, 2002 (Argentina); April 5, 2002 (Spain)
- Running time: 93 minutes
- Countries: Argentina; Spain
- Language: Spanish

Todas las azafatas van al cielo (Every Stewardess Goes to Heaven) is a 2002 Argentine and Spanish comedy drama film directed by Daniel Burman and written by Burman and Emiliano Torres. The picture was produced by Pablo Bossi, Pedro D'Angelo, Diego Dubcovsky and José María Morales. It features Alfredo Casero as Julián and Ingrid Rubio as the air hostess Teresa.

The metaphorical romantic comedy-drama is about a widowed ophthalmologist and a free-spirited airline flight-attendant (who the director believes seems to hold a certain fascination in western culture).

== Plot ==
The story tells of Julián (Alfredo Casero), an overweight ophthalmologist who is emotionally upset due to the unexpected death of his flight-attendant wife and of Teresa (Ingrid Rubio) a free-spirited young stewardess who is unhappy in love and fearful that she is pregnant. Julián makes the decision to travel to the Ushuaia, Tierra del Fuego, where he and his wife first met, in order to scatter his wife's ashes and to follow his wife in death.

At the end of a cold ski lift ride, Julián meets Teresa when they both attempt suicide at the same time by standing out in the snow. Instead of tragedy, they decide get a warm drink and begin to grow to like each other. After spending the night together, they depart. Teresa is a bit upset that she's late for work and blames Julián. She tries to get back to work but has problems because of terrorist threats at the airport. Julián, crashes his rental car but survives and spends a long time in the hospital recovering. He starts to appreciate life again and tries to find Teresa. Fate pushes them back together.

== Cast ==
- Alfredo Casero as Julián
- Ingrid Rubio as Teresa
- Emilio Disi as Álvarez
- Valentina Bassi as Lili
- Verónica Llinás as nurse
- Kayne Di Pilato as Camila
- Norma Aleandro Teresa's mother
- Rodolfo Samsó as pilot
- Nazareno Casero as bellboy
- Daniel Hendler as taxi driver
- José Fabio Sancinetto as pharmacist
- Catalina Rautenberg as model
- Dolores Trull as model

== Background ==
The film was shot in Buenos Aires and Ushuaia, Tierra del Fuego, Argentina. The title in Spanish is an untranslatable pun: Cielo means both "sky" and "heaven," and the Spanish script has plenty of fun with the ambiguity.

== Distribution ==
The film was first featured in Argentina on March 21, 2002. It screened in sixteen countries worldwide. The motion picture premiered in Spain on April 5, 2002 and in Portugal June 2002, where it won an award at the Festróia Film Festival.

It was presented at various film festivals, including: the Helsinki International Film Festival, Finland; the Warsaw Film Festival, Poland; the Gent International Film Festival, Belgium; the Bergen International Film Festival, Norway; the Newport Beach Film Festival, Newport Beach, California; and others.

== Critical reception ==
Reviewer Fred Thom, writing for the La Plume Noir, liked the look of the film, and wrote, "The director multiplies allegories, making the stewardess an angel whose wings would be those of a plane while the hospital shown to us like a corridor towards another life. The images pass slowly, posed and quiet, supported by an atmospheric soundtrack, making Every Stewardess Goes To Heaven a visually bewitching work."

Film critic Neil Young liked the film and wrote, "Burman aims to craft a frothy lampoon of people whose are fine in the air, hopeless on the ground. While some of the aeroplane-terrorism jokes may seem somewhat awkward post-9/11, it’s hard to avoid being carried along: like the cobbled-together plane we keep hearing about through the film, this may be a slightly ungainly and enterprise, but it gets quite nimbly from A to B."

Jonathan Holland, critic for Variety magazine, liked the film and its quirky themes, writing "A delightful, offbeat romance that combines melancholy and mirth in just the right amounts, Daniel Burman's Every Stewardess Goes to Heaven is a worthy addition to the list of acclaimed pics that have emerged from Argentina recently, as well as a fine followup to Burman's multiple prize-winning (but very different) Waiting for the Messiah (1999). Ingrid Rubio, a sometimes shaky screen presence to date, finds her feet in this sentimental but intelligent story with quirky yet believable characters and stunning polar-circle settings. Charming fable about how people whom life has turned cold must learn to warm up again was well received at the Berlin fest, and further such showings are likely, though that's less than the movie deserves."

Yet, Robert Hunter, writing for The Hollywood Reporter magazine, thought the film was a "diverting but lackluster romancer" and the story needed the visuals to make it interesting. He wrote, "[T]his flight of fancy needs every glimpse of the location's glaciers, soaring white peaks and stormy skies."

== Awards ==
Wins

- Festróia - Tróia International Film Festival: Golden Dolphin; Daniel Burman; 2002.
- Santa Fe Film Festival: Luminaria Award; Best Latino Film; 2002.
- Newport Beach Film Festival: Best Director; Daniel Burman; 2003.

Nominations

- AFI Film Festival: Grand Jury Prize; 2002.
