= Atzmus (band) =

Argentine fusion rock band

- Origin: Buenos Aires, Argentina
- Genres: Rock, nu metal
- Years active: 2008–2020
- Labels: Sony Music
- Members: Eliezer Barletta; Emanuel Cohenca; Damian Merluccio
- Past members: Gonzalo Benas; Sebastian Castro Cobucci; Javier Portillo; Josué Arrúa
- Website: atzmus.com

Atzmus was an Argentine fusion rock band which specialized in spiritual themes. In line with lead vocalist Eliezer Barletta, its musical genre could be characterized as nu metal, despite being difficult to define. Some also classify it as "melodic industrial rock". In reference to their melodies, Rolling Stone magazine noted how their music was reminiscent of some Middle Eastern music. They have a small following in Spain, Mexico, Italy, Russia and the United States.

== Name ==
Atzmus is a kabbalistic concept which refers to the ineffable and undefinable essence of the Godhead. According to band members, the name was chosen out of a "feeling" that the music they composed together was undefinable, as they as musicians came from very different musical backgrounds and styles.

== Themes ==
The songs are written from a spiritual and sometimes mystical perspective. Barletta stated that the connection between rock and spirituality is "the constructive rebelliousness of not accepting the concealment of Divinity in the world". He is a Haredi Jew of the Chabad branch of Hassidism and regards Menachem Mendel Schneerson as his spiritual teacher. In this respect, towards the end of one song (No corras más) a recording of a rebbe's speech can be heard. Most lyrics are written by Barletta, with only a few exceptions (such as Estar en vos by Portillo). This is the reason why the language of the lyrics is strongly influenced by Jewish religious tradition, despite the band not being composed only of Jews. Originally, in Barletta's words, it was just a coming together of four musicians from different religious or spiritual backgrounds. Two of them were Orthodox Jews (Barletta and Cohenca), the other two were Evangelical Christians. However, the group never focused on their religious differences but on making music together. Nevertheless, the Jewish element is prevalent, as Hebrew terms are often heard in their lyrics, such as Baruch haBa (masculine for "welcome"), Beit HaMikdash (Holy Temple), tzadikim (Jewish "saints"), and Yesh Me'ayin (Jewish concept for creatio ex nihilo). Having been an object of confusion, Barletta explained he is not a rabbi nor a seminarist. Barletta's Haredi fashion, this use of Hebrew terms, and kabbalistic imagery led many to label Atzmus as Jewish. There is even a literal quote from the Mishnah in No corras más: "Who is strong? One who overpowers his inclinations" (Avot 4:1).

In consonance with Hassidic teachings, the first song of Ciudad de luz is a Belarusian nigun called Nye Zhuritze Chlopzi ("Don't Worry, Fellows") which was traditionally sung by Hassidim on their road to the city of Lyubavichi (Lubavitch in Yiddish). Social researcher Damián Setton asserted that kabbalistic topics arise from the knowledge Barletta acquired through his conversion to Judaism. Setton also suggested that Estar en vos (Being in you) is the most 'Evangelical' song in their repertoire, thought the band finds such a description restrictive. They said that Estar en vos could be understood as a love song on the one hand, and on the other as a song that talks about the need of being in connection with God. Such connection, they argued, is an experience that exceeds religious categorizations. "[N]o one imposes anything on anyone. Sometimes we think that to develop concepts of union or peace between men we have to think all the same, believe all the same, but peace is not homogeneity... There may be men without religion but men can not [be] without love, because the basis and foundation of the world is love. And for that, as musicians we make songs with lyrics that invite reflection and inner development." Barletta has said that they look for a common thread in their songs and albums to bring about a "conceptual work".

Barletta reported that Ciudad de luz album has a "native sound, very white lyrics which reflect the purpose of existence from a Hassidic perspective of life and the worlds". More importantly, he gave a series of interviews in which he explained the meaning of several lyrics from Ciudad de luz. In the case of Jardines de fuego ("Gardens of Fire") he made it clear that it referred to the Jewish teaching that when a Torah scroll is written, both the black letters and the leather (considered white) are conveying a message. The "message" is not only in the written letters, but in the spaces between them. This means, he continued, that not only what is revealed is good for us, but also those hidden things that are judged as bad because we do not yet understand them, as we are unable to see the concealed love present in them. This is how "pain also makes us grow," as the lyrics go. Besides, Juntos al este is a reference to the construction of the Third Temple in Jerusalem, also known by its Hebrew name Beit HaMikdash. In the end, Barletta claimed this album is "the story of the soul in search of her Creator".

In reference to what the song (and its homonymous clip) Ser Humano meant, Barletta answered it is the struggle of man facing its defects. The ability of being born again, not giving up until reaching something. "It is impossible," he continued, "that a physical being have no defects. The thing is not running away or hiding from them. Nor giving up. It is about facing the fact that they exist and work until outdoing yourself. It can feel uneasy at first, but it is a divine path at the end of the day."

== Members ==
- Eliezer Barletta – lead vocalist (2008–present)
- Emanuel Cohenca – guitar (2008–present)
- Damian Merluccio – drums (2016–present)

=== Past members ===
- Gonzalo Benas – bass (2016–2018)
- Sebastian Castro Cobucci – bass (2016)
- Javier Portillo – bass (2008–2016)
- Josué Arrúa – drums (2008–2016)

== Discography ==
- Ciudad de luz [City of Light] (2009)
1. Nigun (02:06)
2. Ciudad de luz (03:18)
3. Vuelve a empezar (03:19)
4. El 10 del 7 (03:03)
5. Sombre hombros de gigantes (03:53)
6. Jardines de fuego (04:00)
7. Juntos al este (03:24)
8. Un mundo nuevo (03:59)
9. Purificándote (02:55)
10. Estar en vos (03:02)
11. La última generación (03:21)
12. Hijo del vientre (04:03)
- No hay mundo sin amor [There is No World Without Love] (2013)
1. Evolución (03:12)
2. Dulce mar (03:30)
3. No corras más (03:24)
4. Contra la corriente (03:)
5. No hay mundo sin amor (03:59)
6. Conexión directa (03:23)
7. Pan (04:20)
8. No es cuestión de suerte (03:32)
9. Armonía (03:05)
10. Lágrimas para crecer (04:09)
11. Volver a Tzión (03:35)
12. Todos somos uno (02:49)
- Ser humano Lado A [Being Human A-Side] (2015)
1. Ser humano (04:35)
2. Zombies (03:26)
3. Resistir y seguir (03:52)
4. Insurgente (03:53)

The band is presently working on "Más humano" [More human]. Most of their songs can be downloaded for free from Atzmus' official site.

== Filmography ==
They made an appearance in 2012 Daniel Burman's film La suerte en tus manos, with Barletta portraying a rabbi.
