= Ramiro Civita =

Argentine cinematographer (born 1966)

- Born: 16 December 1966 (age 59); Buenos Aires, Argentina
- Other names: Ramiro Aisenson
- Occupation: Cinematographer
- Years active: 1994–present

Ramiro Civita (born 16 December 1966) is an Argentine cinematographer (sometimes credited as Ramiro Aisenson) who has been active since 1994 and primarily made documentaries and feature films in Argentina, Spain, and Italy, working with directors such as Fernando León de Aranoa, Daniel Burman, and Silvio Soldini. For his camera work on the Italian mystery thriller The Girl by the Lake, directed by Andrea Molaioli, Civita was nominated for several film awards and won the David di Donatello for Best Cinematography.

== Filmography ==
=== Film ===
- Buenos Aires Vice Versa (1996)
- Bajo un mismo techo (1996)
- El Juguete rabioso (1998)
- Fin de siglo (1998)
- Siesta (1998)
- Garage Olimpo (1999)
- Waiting for the Messiah (2000)
- Sailing Home (2001)
- Saluzzi - Ensayo para bandoneon y tres hermanos (2001)
- ¿Sabés nadar? (2002)
- Todas las azafatas van al cielo (2002)
- La Quimera de los héroes (2003)
- Ciudad de Dios (2003)
- Whisky Romeo Zulu (2004)
- Lost Embrace (2004)
- Princesas (2005)
- Real, la película (2005)
- Hermanas (2005)
- Fuerza aérea sociedad anónima (2006)
- Family Law (2006)
- The Girl by the Lake (2007)
- Days and Clouds (2007)
- Amador (2010)
- Bota (2014)
- The Man Who Bought the Moon (2018)

=== Television ===
- Lavelli (1996)
- The Suitor (2001)
- Pacto de silencio (2004)
