= List of Argentine films of 2017 =

A list of Argentine-produced and co-produced feature films released in Argentina in 2017.

== Films ==
Release date	Title (Domestic title)	Cast & Crew	Co-production	Ref.
19 January	Black Snow (Nieve negra)	Martín Hodara (dir.), Ricardo Darín, Leonardo Sbaraglia, Laia Costa, Dolores Fonzi, Federico Luppi	AR-ES	
13 April	The Lighthouse of the Orcas (El faro de las orcas)	Gerardo Olivares (dir.), Maribel Verdú, Joaquín Furriel	AR-ES	
30 March	The Lost Brother (El otro hermano)	Israel Adrián Caetano (dir.), Daniel Hendler, Leonardo Sbaraglia	AR-UY-ES-FR	
8 June	The Bar (El bar)	Álex de la Iglesia (dir.), Blanca Suárez, Mario Casas, Carmen Machi, Alejandro Awada, Terele Pávez		
15 June	You Only Live Once (Solo se vive una vez)	Federico Cueva (dir.), Peter Lanzani, Luis Brandoni, Pablo Rago, Eugenia Suárez, Santiago Segura, Gerard Depardieu, Hugo Silva	AR-ES	
6 July	Ten Days Without Mom (Mamá se fue de viaje)	Ariel Winograd (dir.), Diego Peretti, Carla Peterson		
17 August	The Summit (La cordillera)	Santiago Mitre (dir.), Ricardo Darín, Dolores Fonzi, Érica Rivas	AR-ES-FR	
28 September	Zama	Lucrecia Martel (dir.), Daniel Giménez Cacho, Lola Dueñas, Matheus Nachtergaele, Juan Minujín, Rafael Spregelburd	AR-BR-ES	
	Pinamar	Federico Godfrid (dir.), Lautaro Churruarín, Juan Grandinetti, Violeta Palukas, Agustín Pardella		
