= Jorge D'Elía =

Argentine actor and playwright

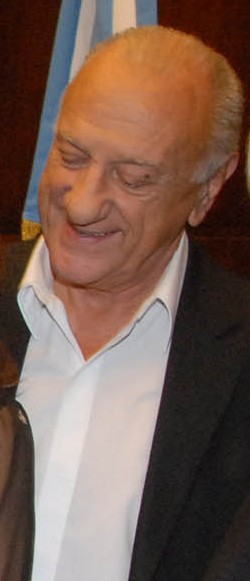
- Born: April 28, 1938 (age 87); La Plata, Argentina
- Children: Federico D'Elía

Jorge D'Elía (born April 28, 1938 in La Plata, Argentina) is an Argentine film and television actor, as well as a playwright. He is mostly known for his recurring role in the television series Los simuladores (2002–2004), which starred his son Federico D'Elía.

== Filmography (partial) ==
- El Fondo del mar (2003) aka The Bottom of the Sea
- Guaschos (2004)
- El Abrazo partido (2004) aka Lost Embrace
- El Aura (2005) aka The Aura
- Un Día (2006)
- 7th Floor (2013)

== Television (partial) ==
- Los Simuladores (2002) aka Pretenders
- El Precio del poder (2002)
- Locas de amor (2004)
- Sálvame María (2005)
- Hechizada (2006)
