= Empty nest =

Empty nest can refer to:

- Empty nest syndrome, experienced by parents when children move away from their parents' house
- Empty Nest, an American television show
- Empty Nest (film), a 2008 Argentine drama film
