= Emilio Disi =

Argentine actor (1943–2018)

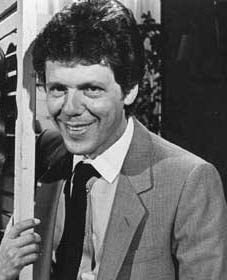
Disi in the 1980s

Emilio Disi (2 August 1943 – 14 March 2018) was an Argentine actor.

Born Emilio Roberto Parada, he was active from 1968 to 2017. In 2002, he appeared in Daniel Burman's film Todas las azafatas van al cielo. Disi appeared in a number of TV series. His last performance was in 2017. He died of lung cancer, aged 75, in 2018.

== Filmography ==
- Soy tu karma (2017)
- Muerte en Buenos Aires (2014)
- Querida, voy a comprar cigarillos y vuelvo (2011)
- "Dinamitados" (2004 TV Series) .... Various
- "Tercer tiempo" (2003 TV Series)
- "099 Central" (2002 TV Series) .... Fausta Brigade 099 (International: English title)
- Todas las azafatas van al cielo (2002) .... Señalero
- "Iturralde, Los" (2000 TV Series) .... Emilio Iturralde
- "Susana Giménez" (1998 TV Series .... Emilio (unknown episodes)
- "Rompeportones" (1998 TV Series)
- "Stress" (1990 TV Series) .... Emiliano
- Locuras del extraterrestre, Las (1988)
- Pilotos más locos del mundo, Los (1988)
- Matamonstruos en la mansion del terror, Los (1987)
- Bañeros más locos del mundo, Los (1987) .... Emilio
- Brigada explosiva contra los ninjas (1986) .... Emilio
- Búsqueda, La (1985) .... Hermano del jefe
- Telo y la tele, El (1985)
- Reyes del sablazo, Los (1984)
- La Aventura explosiva (1977)
- Golpes bajos, Los (1974)
- "Me llaman Gorrión" (1972 TV Series) .... Gaona (unknown episodes)
- "Tobogán, El" (1971 TV) .... Héctor
- "Alta comedia: El avaro" (1971 TV) .... Flecha
- "¡Robot!" (1970; TV miniseries)
- Fuiste mía un verano (1969)
- Somos los mejores (1968)
