= César Lerner =

Film score composer

César Lerner is a film composer.

He works in the cinema of Argentina.

César Lerner frequently collaborates and performs with Marcelo Moguilevsky. Based in Buenos Aires the Lerner Moguilevsky Dúo plays jazz- and tango-influenced klezmer. The duo accompanied Pope Francis on his visit to Israel in 2014.

== Filmography ==
- Nueve reinas (2000) aka Nine Queens
- Esperando al mesías (2000) aka Waiting for the Messiah
- Aquellos niños (2003)
- El abrazo partido (2004) Lost Embrace
- Derecho de familia (2006) aka Family Law
- Rancho Aparte (2007)
- Cohen Vs. Rossi (1998)
- Lea y Mira dejan su huella (2018)
- La Experiencia Judía - de Basavilbaso a Nueva Amsterdam (2019)
