= Ronald Melzer =

- Born: 17 December 1956; Montevideo, Uruguay
- Died: 24 June 2013 (aged 56)
- Other occupation: Film critic, Film producer, Sports journalist, Public accountant

Domestic
Years	League	Role

Ronald Melzer (December 17, 1956, in Montevideo – June 24, 2013, in Montevideo) was a Uruguayan film critic, film producer, sports journalist, football referee, and public accountant. He played a crucial role in both the cinematic and sports journalism fields in Uruguay, leaving a lasting impact on national culture.

== Early life and career ==
Ronald Melzer was born in 1956 in Uruguay. His passion for cinema and sports journalism led him to become a well-respected critic and columnist. Throughout his career, he contributed to major publications such as El Observador and Brecha, where he wrote extensively about both film and football.

== Contributions to film and television ==
Melzer was one of Uruguay’s most respected film critics. His work went beyond reviewing movies—he sought to preserve and promote Uruguayan cinema as an essential part of the country's cultural heritage. His critiques often delved into the philosophical and sociopolitical implications of films, making him a distinctive voice in the field.

He was also a football analyst who contributed to discussions about the evolution of the sport in Uruguay. Through his columns, he dissected football tactics, player performances, and the broader influence of the sport on society. His writings showcased a balance between admiration for the game and critical insight into its development.

== Influence in Uruguayan cinema ==
Melzer founded and directed Video Imagen Club, an influential video rental store specializing in classic cinema, for 28 years until his death. This videoclub became a crucial space for a generation of Uruguayan filmmakers, including Juan Pablo Rebella, Pablo Stoll, and Daniel Hendler. Through Video Imagen Club, Melzer introduced young filmmakers to a diverse range of films, shaping their creative perspectives and fostering a deep appreciation for cinema.

Additionally, he founded Videograma, a VHS publishing company dedicated to classic films. This later evolved into BuenCine Producciones, a film distribution and production company that played a key role in the Uruguayan film industry.

== Legacy and impact ==
Melzer was widely regarded as a "guardian of Uruguayan cinema," a title that reflected his lifelong dedication to film preservation and criticism. His contributions were recognized by colleagues and cultural institutions in Uruguay. He was known for his meticulous approach to film analysis and his commitment to maintaining high journalistic standards.

On June 24, 2013, Ronald Melzer died, leaving behind a legacy of cultural and sports journalism. His death was widely mourned in Uruguay, with tributes published in El Observador, Brecha, and other media outlets that acknowledged his lasting impact on film criticism and sports analysis.
