= The Lost Brother =

- Theatrical release poster
- Spanish: El otro hermano
- Directed by: Israel Adrián Caetano
- Screenplay by: Nora Mazzitelli; Israel Adrián Caetano
- Based on: Bajo este sol tremendo by Carlos Busqued
- Produced by: Natacha Cervi; Hernán Musaluppi
- Starring: Leonardo Sbaraglia; Daniel Hendler
- Cinematography: Julián Apezteguía
- Edited by: Pablo Barbieri
- Music by: Iván Wyzsogrod
- Production companies: Rizoma; Oriental Features; Mod Producciones; Gloria Films
- Release dates: 10 March 2017 (MFF); 30 March 2017 (Argentina); 12 April 2017 (Uruguay)
- Countries: Argentina; Uruguay; Spain; France
- Language: Spanish

The Lost Brother (Spanish: El otro hermano) is a 2017 thriller drama film directed by Israel Adrián Caetano based on the novel Bajo este sol tremendo by Carlos Busqued which stars Leonardo Sbaraglia and Daniel Hendler.

== Plot ==
Upon the murder of his mother and brother, unemployed Cetarti returns to his hometown of Lapachito in the Chaco, aiming to collect the insurance for his relatives' deaths and start off a new life in Brazil. He comes across psychopathic Duarte.

== Cast ==
- Daniel Hendler as Javier Cetarti
- Leonardo Sbaraglia as Duarte
- Alejandra Flechner as Eva
- Alian Devetac as Danielito
- Ángela Molina as Marta
- Pablo Cedrón as Enzo

== Release ==
The film was presented at the 2017 Miami Film Festival. It also screened at the 20th Málaga Film Festival on 19 March 2017. Argentine and Uruguayan theatrical release dates were programmed for, respectively, 30 March 2017 and 12 April 2017.

== Production ==
The film is an Argentine-Uruguayan-Spanish-French co-production by Rizoma alongside Oriental Features, MOD Producciones and Gloria Films. It had backing from INCAA, ICAU, ICAA, Ibermedia, and CNC's Aide aux Cinémas du Monde. Shooting locations included San Antonio de Areco, in the province of Buenos Aires.

== Reception ==
Jonathan Holland of The Hollywood Reporter considered the film to be "an enjoyably grungy item about moral turpitude in the Argentine backwoods".

María Fernanda Mugica of La Nación gave the film a 'very good' rating, describing it as "nihilistic film that plunges the viewer for almost two hours into hopeless darkness".

Pablo O. Scholz of Clarín also gave The Lost Brother a 'very good' score, pointing out that it is a film with which "the best Caetano is back".

== Accolades ==
Year	Award	Category	Nominee(s)	Result	Ref.
2017	20th Málaga Film Festival	Silver Biznaga for Best Actor	Leonardo Sbaraglia	Won	
2018	66th Silver Condor Awards	Best Film		Nominated	
2018	66th Silver Condor Awards	Best Director	Israel Adrián Caetano	Nominated	
2018	66th Silver Condor Awards	Best Adapted Screenplay	Israel Adrián Caetano, Nora Mazzitelli	Nominated	
2018	66th Silver Condor Awards	Best Actor	Leonardo Sbaraglia	Won	
2018	66th Silver Condor Awards	Best Supporting Actress	Alejandra Flechner	Nominated	
2018	66th Silver Condor Awards	Best Supporting Actor	Alian Devetac	Nominated	
2018	66th Silver Condor Awards	Best Cinematography	Julián Apezteguía	Nominated	
2018	66th Silver Condor Awards	Best Editing	Pablo Barbieri	Won	
2018	66th Silver Condor Awards	Best Original Score	Iván Wyszogrod	Nominated	
2018	66th Silver Condor Awards	Best Sound	Catriel Vildosola	Nominated	
2018	66th Silver Condor Awards	Best Makeup and Hairstyles	Dolores Giménez	Nominated	
2018	12th Sur Awards	Best Adapted Screenplay	Israel Adrián Caetano, Nora Mazzitelli	Nominated	
2018	12th Sur Awards	Best Actor	Leonardo Sbaraglia	Nominated	
2018	12th Sur Awards	Best Supporting Actor	Pablo Cedrón	Won	
2018	12th Sur Awards	Best Cinematography	Julián Apezteguía	Nominated	

== See also ==
- List of Argentine films of 2017

== Bibliography ==
- Setton, Roman Pablo (2018). "El otro hermano, animalidad, razón utilitaria y política como pilares constructivos del noir en la actualidad". Alea: Estudos Neolatinos. 20 (1). Rio de Janeiro: 110–124. doi:10.1590/1517-106X/2018201110124. hdl:11336/98146.
