= Bottom of the Sea =

- Theatrical release poster
- Directed by: Damián Szifrón
- Written by: Damián Szifrón
- Produced by: Sebastián Aloi; Nathalie Cabiron; Damián Cukierkorn
- Starring: Daniel Hendler; Dolores Fonzi; Gustavo Garzón
- Cinematography: Lucio Bonelli
- Edited by: Nicolás Goldbart
- Music by: Guillermo Guareschi
- Release date: 11 March 2003 (Argentina)
- Running time: 105 minutes
- Country: Argentina
- Language: Spanish

Bottom of the Sea (Spanish: El fondo del mar) is a 2003 Argentine comedy-drama thriller film written and directed by Damián Szifrón and starring Daniel Hendler, Dolores Fonzi and Gustavo Garzón. It was produced by Sebastián Aloi, Nathalie Cabiron, and Damián Cukierkorn. The associate producers were Diana Frey and Guillermo Otero.

The story deals with jealousy and the maturity required for a person to overcome it.

== Synopsis ==
A slightly neurotic architecture student, Ezequiel Toledo (Daniel Hendler), drops by his girlfriend Ana's (Dolores Fonzi) apartment and finds a man named Aníbal (Gustavo Garzón) hiding under her bed. Aníbal retires quietly without knowing of Ezequiel's discovery, and Ana does not mention him at all. Ezequiel begins to suspect Ana and jealousy fills him. He decides to follow Aníbal, whom he's sure is having an affair with Ana. This is the start of a night's odyssey for Ezequiel, who trails his suspect and starts to gather small details about his life and identity. At one point Ezequiel sets fire to Aníbal's car and threatens his life. The events spiral even more as Ezequiel is later followed by Ana.

== Cast ==
- Daniel Hendler as Ezequiel Toledo
- Dolores Fonzi as Ana
- Gustavo Garzón as Aníbal
- Ramiro Agüero as Altclas
- Ignacio Mendi as Rolandelli
- José Palomino Cortez as Máximo
- Rafael Filipelli as Filipelli
- Mercedes Halfon as Voz en el teléfono
- Diego Peretti as Cómico 1
- Alejandro Fiore as Cómico 2
- Gabriel Fernández as Joven Arquitecto
- Daniel Valenzuela as Valenzuela
- Claudio Rissi as Taxista

== Distribution ==
The film was first presented at the Mar del Plata Film Festival at the March 11, 2003. It opened wide in Argentina on August 28, 2003.

The film has been screened at some film festivals, including: the Toulouse Latin America Film Festival, France; the Latin America Film Festival, Poland; the Lleida Latin-American Film Festival, Spain; the Donostia-San Sebastián International Film Festival, Spain; and others.

== Critical reception ==
Critic Gustavo J. Castagna, reporting from the Mar del Plata Film Festival for FIPRESCI liked the film, and wrote, "El fondo del mar is clearly directed to the box office crowds when made through the use of mixed genres, but it does not fall into any false intents; closer to the aesthetics of Fabian Bielinsky's Nine Queens, El fondo del mar shows that a cinema made with pleasure and formal rigor is still possible."

Neil Young thought the film was an "unassuming but very likeable little comedy with dramatic touches...writer-director makes a very old set-up seem fresh, funny and surprising." Yet, Young thought director Damián Szifrón lost his way at the end.

== Awards ==
Wins

- Clarin Entertainment Awards: Clarin Award Best Film Actor, Gustavo Garzón; Best Film Director, Damián Szifron; Best Film; Best Film Screenplay, Damián Szifron; 2003.
- Mar del Plata Film Festival: Audience Award, Damián Szifron; Best Ibero-American Film, Damián Szifron; FIPRESCI Prize - Special Mention Best Latin-American Film, Damián Szifron; 2003.
- Donostia-San Sebastián International Film Festival: Horizons Award - Special Mention, Damián Szifron, 2003.
- Argentine Film Critics Association Awards: Silver Condor; Best Supporting Actor, Gustavo Garzón; 2004.
- Lleida Latin-American Film Festival: Best Actor, Daniel Hendler; Best First Work, Damián Szifron; 2004.

Nominations

- Argentine Film Critics Association Awards: Silver Condor, Best Actor, Daniel Hendler; Best Art Direction, Mariela Rípodas and Lucia Onofri; Best Cinematography, Lucio Bonelli; Best Director, Damián Szifron; Best Film; Best First Film, Damián Szifron; Best Original Screenplay, Damián Szifron; Best Sound, Jesica Suarez, Marcos De Aguirre and Fernando Soldevila; Best Supporting Actress, Dolores Fonzi; 2004.
