= The Tenth Man (2016 film) =

2016 film

- Film poster
- Directed by: Daniel Burman
- Written by: Daniel Burman
- Starring: Dan Breitman
- Distributed by: Buena Vista International
- Release date: 11 February 2016
- Running time: 80 minutes
- Country: Argentina
- Languages: Spanish; Hebrew

The Tenth Man (Spanish: El rey del Once) is a 2016 Argentine drama film directed by Daniel Burman. It was shown in the Panorama section at the 66th Berlin International Film Festival.

== Cast ==
- Dan Breitman as Mumi Singer
- Elisa Carricajo as Mónica
- Elvira Onetto as Susy
- Alan Sabbagh as Ariel
- Adrián Stoppelman as Mamuñe
- Julieta Zylberberg as Eva
