= Lost Embrace =

2004 film

- Theatrical release poster
- Spanish: El abrazo partido
- Directed by: Daniel Burman
- Written by: Marcelo Birmajer; Daniel Burman
- Produced by: Diego Dubcovsky; Daniel Burman
- Starring: Daniel Hendler; Jorge D'Elia; Adriana Aizemberg
- Narrated by: Daniel Hendler
- Cinematography: Ramiro Civita
- Edited by: Alejandro Brodersohn
- Music by: César Lerner
- Production companies: BD Cine; Paradise Films; Classic; Wanda Vision
- Distributed by: Distribution Company Sudamericana (Arg.); Océan Films (Fra.); Istituto Luce (Ita.); Wanda Vision (Spa.)
- Release dates: February 9, 2004 (Germany); March 25, 2004 (Argentina)
- Running time: 100 minutes
- Countries: Argentina; France; Italy; Spain
- Languages: Spanish; Korean; Lithuanian; Yiddish

Lost Embrace (Spanish: El abrazo partido) is a 2004 comedy-drama film directed by Daniel Burman and written by Burman and Marcelo Birmajer. The film features Daniel Hendler, Adriana Aizemberg, Jorge D'Elía, among others.

The film was Argentina's official selection for the 2004 Academy Award for Best Foreign Language Film, though it was not nominated.

The comedy-drama tells of Ariel Makaroff, the grandson of Holocaust-era Polish refugees, who is currently on a complex search for his personal and cultural identity.

It is the second of a semi-autobiographical trilogy by Burman, preceded by Waiting for the Messiah (2000) and followed by Family Law (2006), and also starring Hendler.

== Plot ==
The episodes in the life of a Jewish family in the Once neighborhood of Buenos Aires and the other shopkeepers in a low-rent commercial gallery are depicted in the story.

The narrator, Ariel Makaroff (Daniel Hendler), is the son of Sonia Makaroff (Adriana Aizemberg) who was deserted by her husband (Jorge D'Elía) when he went to Israel in 1973 to fight in the Yom Kippur War. Yet, the father is in touch with Sonia via telephone weekly and supports Ariel and his brother Joseph (Sergio Boris). Sonia runs a lingerie shop in the gallery.

Ariel is a young man in a hurry without much of a sense of direction. He's having an affair with Rita (Silvina Bosco), an older woman, pines for his former girlfriend Estella (Melina Petriella), and fantasizes of emigrating to Poland, where his family came from during World War II.

He carps at his grandmother (Rosita Londner) for immigration documents that will support his claim to Polish citizenship as he wants to become "European." This forces his grandmother to remember her memories of Holocaust Poland.

Ariel also visits the rabbi in order to get documents. One of them has been cut in a corner and the rabbi explains: "So, no one can use it again." - "Oh! Like circumcision!", Ariel retorts.

At one point, the shop owners organize a race against another group of merchants. They hope to earn a cash purse and fix up the exterior of their gallery and install air conditioning.

Other characters include: a large Italian family whose noisy arguments drown out the radios in their radio repair shop; a quiet Korean couple who run a feng shui boutique; Mitelman (Diego Korol) who runs a travel agency, but which is really a front for currency smuggling; and a solitary stationer named Osvaldo (Isaac Fajm).

Right before the big race his father suddenly shows up in Buenos Aires. His mother confesses to Ariel that his father left Argentina and the family because she had a brief affair with Osvaldo, the retailer next door. It was a one time thing and did not mean anything but it ruined the marriage. Ariel finally gets to hear his father's side of the story: he could not get over the fact that his mother had betrayed him with Osvaldo. Elías can finally enfold his son in a long-overdue embrace, and Ariel embraces his father as well in the closing moments of the film.

The grandmother sings a klezmer song over the closing credits.

== Cast ==
- Daniel Hendler as Ariel Makaroff, a young man desperately on a complex search for his personal and cultural identity. He's upset at his father abandoned him and his family in the early 1970s.
- Adriana Aizemberg as Sonia Makaroff, wants to get on with her life, and seems to have forgiven her former husband. She runs "Elías Creations" at the Gallery and loves to dance to Jewish folk songs with her boyfriend Marcos.
- Sergio Boris as Joseph Makaroff, is absorbed in his business, which involves importing novelties and maintaining elaborate feuds.
- Diego Korol as Mitelman, is Ariel's best friend who's too fascinated by his Lithuanian secretary to think about anything else.
- Silvina Bosco as Rita, runs the internet shop and seduces Ariel every chance she gets.
- Rosita Londner as abuela de Ariel, who fled Poland during World War II with her husband. She's also a talented singer who gave up singing after she came to Argentina.
- Isaac Fajm as Osvaldo, is the owner of a stationery store. We find out late in the film that he had a brief affair with Sonia Makaroff.
- Jorge D'Elía as Elías Makaroff, the father of the Makaroff family who left for Israel in the early 1970s, ostensibly to fight in the Yom Kippur War.
- Melina Petriella as Estela
- Atilio Pozzobon as Saligani Papá
- Mónica Cabrera as Saligani Mamá
- Franco Tirri as Saligani Hijo
- Luciana Dulizky as Saligani Hija
- Eloy Burman as Saligani Bebé
- Juan José Flores Quispe as Ramón
- Catalina Cho as Ho Kim
- Pablo Kim as Kim
- Wolfrans Hecht as Polish consul
- Salo Pasik as Marcos

== Background ==
Lost Embrace is part of a loose trilogy of films. The other two are: Waiting for the Messiah (2000) and Family Law (2006). All were written and directed by Burman and star Daniel Hendler. They are largely autobiographical, dealing with the life of a young Jew in contemporary Buenos Aires.

=== Title ===
The name of the film in Spanish is an intentional pun: abrazo means "embrace" and does not make sense followed by partido "broken" or "gone," but the idiom a brazo partido, literally "with a broken arm," means "to fight forcefully, strenuously." It could also be understood as "the halved hug," that is, an incompleted hug or made with just one arm.

== Distribution ==
The film was first featured at the Berlin International Film Festival on February 9, 2004. It opened in Argentina on March 25, 2004.

The film screened in many film festivals, including: the Helsinki International Film Festival, Finland; the Warsaw Film Festival, Poland; the Pusan International Film Festival, South Korea; the Chicago International Film Festival, United States; the Bangkok World Film Festival, Thailand; the São Paulo International Film Festival, Brazil; the London Film Festival, UK; and others.

The film was released in Argentina on VHS and DVD by Argentina Video Home under license from Distribution Company on July 3, 2004; with English, Portuguese and Spanish subtitles and extras. It was re-issued on DVD by SBP on March 13, 2013, with the same specifications besides the removal of Portuguese subtitles.

== Critical reception ==
Lost Embrace garnered mostly positive reviews from film critics. On review aggregate website Rotten Tomatoes, the film holds an overall 83% approval rating based on 48 reviews, with a rating average of 6.7 out of 10. The site's consensus is: "A low-key but charming tale that will put a smile on your face." At Metacritic, which assigns a weighted mean rating out of 0–100 reviews from film critics, the film has a rating score of 70 based on 23 reviews, classified as a generally favorably reviewed film.

Film critic A. O. Scott, film critic for The New York Times, liked the direction of the film, writing, "Lost Embrace never feels strenuous or overdone. The tenderness of the family drama at its center, and the deep, hard-to-articulate feelings of a son for his enigmatic father and his heroically patient mother, emerge with a charming haphazardness. The sly artfulness is apparent only in retrospect. This is a small movie about a small world, but its modesty is part of what makes it durable and satisfying."

Kenneth Turan, film critic for the Los Angeles Times, liked the films direction and wrote, "Director (and co-writer) Burman displays an assured but intimate filmmaking style, at once casual, playful and idiosyncratic. With key sections of the film related by Ariel in voice-over, it's also a style that fosters complicity and connection with a central character who otherwise might not be a personal favorite."

Peter Keough, critic for the Boston Phoenix, also liked Burman's direction, though at times he said the film felt a bit derivative, and wrote, "Burman captures with an affection and an irony that match François Truffaut's, though his stylistic mannerisms can seem a little imitative."

The Boston Globe film critic, Wesley Morris, was impressed by the comedy, and wrote, "Lost Embrace has a novelist's human touch. Were it a book, it would go somewhere on the shelf with Jonathan Safran Foer and early Philip Roth. It also possesses traces of early Jean-Luc Godard and his wit with characters, as well as some of Wes Anderson's random silliness. But unlike in Godard and Anderson, an emotional undercurrent runs beneath this movie, and Burman makes that feel good without feeling strained."

== Awards ==
=== Wins ===
- Bangkok World Film Festival: Best Film; 2004.
- Berlin International Film Festival: Silver Berlin Bear; Best Actor, Daniel Hendler; Jury Grand Prix, Daniel Burman; 2004.
- Lleida Latin-American Film Festival: Best Director; Best Film; ICCI Screenplay Award, Marcelo Birmajer and Daniel Burman; 2004.
- Clarín Awards: Best Film; Best Film Screenplay, Daniel Burman and Marcelo Birmajer; Best Supporting Film Actress, Adriana Aizemberg; 2004.
- Argentine Film Critics Association Awards: Silver Condor; Best Supporting Actress, Adriana Aizemberg; 2005.

=== Nominations ===
- Berlin International Film Festival: Golden Berlin Bear, Daniel Burman; 2004.
- Mar del Plata Film Festival: Best Film, Daniel Burman; 2004.
- Argentine Film Critics Association Awards: Silver Condor, Best Actor (Mejor Actor Protagonico), Daniel Hendler; Best Director (Mejor Director), Daniel Burman; Best Editing (Mejor Compaginación), Alejandro Brodersohn; Best Film (Mejor Película); Best Music (Mejor Música), César Lerner; Best New Actress (Mejor Revelación Femenina), Rosita Londner; Best Screenplay, Original (Mejor Guión Original de Ficción), Marcelo Birmajer and Daniel Burman; Best Supporting Actor (Mejor Actor de Reparto), Jorge D'Elía; 2005.
