= Family Law (film) =

2006 film

- Theatrical release poster
- Directed by: Daniel Burman
- Written by: Daniel Burman
- Produced by: Diego Dubcovsky; José María Morales; Marc Sillam
- Starring: Daniel Hendler; Arturo Goetz; Julieta Díaz; Adriana Aizemberg
- Narrated by: Daniel Hendler
- Cinematography: Ramiro Civita
- Edited by: Alejandro Parysow
- Music by: César Lerner
- Production companies: BD Cine; Wanda Vision; Classic; Paradis Films
- Distributed by: Distribution Company (Arg.); Océan Films (Fra.); Wanda Vision (Spa.)
- Release dates: 10 February 2006 (Germany); 16 March 2006 (Argentina)
- Running time: 102 minutes
- Countries: Argentina; France; Italy; Spain
- Language: Spanish

Family Law (Spanish: Derecho de familia) is a 2006 comedy-drama film, written and directed by Daniel Burman.

The picture was produced by Diego Dubcovsky, José María Morales, and Marc Sillam, and co-produced by Amedeo Pagani. Family Law was Argentina's official submission for the 2004 Academy Award for Best Foreign Language Film.

It is the third of a semi-autobiographical trilogy by Burman, preceded by Waiting for the Messiah (2000) and Lost Embrace (2004), and also starring Hendler.

== Plot ==
The film tells the story of Ariel Perelman (Daniel Hendler). While he has an easygoing lifestyle, he's trying to find his way in life in Buenos Aires, Argentina. He works at a university as a law professor. The film begins with a long narration of the way things stand in his life. He describes his father, Bernardo Perelman (Arturo Goetz), in detail. Perelman, as he's known, is a popular public defender who meets his clients where they work or in restaurants so he can determine what they are "all about." Most of his clients are generally poor. He's very close to his secretary (Adriana Aizenberg) since his wife died fifteen years ago. Work fills Perelman's days, and Ariel is astonished by his energy.

After lusting after Sandra (Julieta Díaz), an attractive woman who takes his class, Ariel decides to chase her and takes the Pilates class she teaches. Not much happens until Sandra is sued for teaching Pilates without the approval of the company who hold the rights to teach Pilates in Argentina. Ariel (known as Perelman to Sandra) reaches out to his father for help and wins the lawsuit.

In the process, Sandra falls in love with the younger Perelman and they marry. She begins to decorate their home for a few years and they have a child they name Gastón (Eloy Burman), who is a quite charming young boy.

Ariel's university building is shut down for a month because it had collapsed, and he is given some time off. However, he doesn't share this news with his wife. During this time his father starts spending some quality time with Ariel, which makes him think something must be wrong. Ariel is asked by the Swiss kindergarten school Gastón attends to participate in a play and swim classes with the other fathers. Ariel first rebels but gives in.

The film ends with his father's death and burial and a long introspective look at Ariel Perelman's life in his 30s.

== Cast ==
- Daniel Hendler as Ariel Perelman
- Arturo Goetz as Bernardo Perelman
- Eloy Burman as Gastón Perelman
- Julieta Díaz as Sandra
- Adriana Aizemberg as Norita
- Jean Pierre Reguerraz as uncle Eduardo Perelman
- Dmitry Rodnoy as Germán
- Luis Albornoz as Echechuny
- Darío Lagos as uncle Mamuñe
- Damián Dreizik as Damidjian
- Gerardo del Águila as Peruano (Peruvian)

== Background ==
Derecho de familia is part of a loose trilogy of films. The other two are: Esperando al mesías (2000) and El abrazo partido (2004). All were written and directed by Burman and star Daniel Hendler. They are largely autobiographical, dealing with the life of a young Jew in contemporary Buenos Aires.

Like the characters in the film, Burman's own father was a lawyer and he also went to law school.

Eloy Burman who plays Gastón Perelman is the young son of director Daniel Burman.

== Distribution ==
The film was first presented at the Berlin International Film Festival on 10 February 2006. It was first screened in Argentina on 16 March 2006 at the Mar del Plata Film Festival. It opened wide in Argentina on 23 March 2006.

The film was shown at various film festivals, including: the Toulouse Latin America Film Festival, France; the Moscow Film Festival, Russia; the Karlovy Vary Film Festival, Czech Republic; the Edinburgh Film Festival, Scotland; the Helsinki International Film Festival, Finland; Films From The South Festival, Norway; the Chicago International Film Festival, USA; the Warsaw Film Festival, Poland; and others.

The film was released on DVD in Argentina on 7 July 2006 by Argentina Video Home.

== Reception ==
=== Critical response ===
Family Law garnered mostly positive reviews from critics. On review aggregate website Rotten Tomatoes, the film holds an overall 73% approval rating based on 41 reviews, with a rating average of 6.7 out of 10. The site's consensus is: "What Family Law lacks in overt drama and conflict, it more than makes us with warm performances and smart, sharp dialogue." At Metacritic, which assigns a weighted mean rating out of 0–100 reviews from film critics, the film has a rating score of 66 based on 18 reviews.

Jonathon Holland of Variety magazine liked the storyline, and wrote, "A deft, witty and emotionally rewarding study of a thirtysomething man in his roles as father and son, Daniel Burman's intensely personal "Family Law" completes his fatherhood trilogy. The second installment, "Lost Embrace", won the Silver Bear at Berlin in 2004. Again featuring an outstanding Daniel Hendler (best actor in 2004) and a script that fuses sharp observation with the intimacy of a lightly rewritten autobiography, pic effortlessly takes the viewer through a range of thoughts and moods. Fans of "Embrace" might lament the relative absence of social context this time, but pic's multiple merits should consolidate helmer's [sic] burgeoning offshore reputation."

The senior film writer at the San Francisco Chronicle, Ruthe Stein, liked the comedy drama's screenplay, the direction and acting, writing, "Family Law—a subtly perceptive charmer that was Argentina's entry for a best foreign film Oscar and might have been nominated in a less competitive year—is in no particular hurry to get where it's going...Although Hendler and Goetz don't really look alike, they manage to convey a family resemblance in their mannerisms, particularly the erect way they carry themselves, as if they're somebody...Aizemberg works wonders. You get the sense from her radiance that the secretary has always had a thing for her boss. His wife's death allowed her to finally express it physically, and she's overjoyed by their intimacy...Ultimately this is a movie about a son's discovery of the man he knows mostly as a father. It's a serious subject handled with humor—not the ha-ha kind, but the hard laughter that comes from recognizing parts of yourself in the Perelmans."

Critics Frederic and Mary Ann Brussat, of the website Spirituality and Practice like the film and wrote, "Family Law explores in a realistic and touching way the emotional barriers that often block intimate conversation between fathers and sons...It's easy today to send e-mails and faxes anywhere in the world, yet we rarely speak to those who live in our neighborhood. We have cellular telephones and pagers, yet we spend very little time in deep conversation with those in our immediate family. This strange phenomenon is depicted very poignantly in this snappy and satisfying film from Argentina written and directed by Daniel Burman. We were very impressed with his Lost Embrace about a father and son reunion after years apart. This one also deals with a father and son relationship."

=== Awards ===
Wins

- Mar del Plata Film Festival: Audience Award; Best Ibero-American Film; SIGNIS Award; all for Daniel Burman; 2006.
- Clarín Entertainment Awards: Clarín Award Best Film Screenplay, Daniel Burman; Best Supporting Film Actress, Adriana Aizemberg; 2006.
- Argentine Film Critics Association Awards: Silver Condor, Best Director, Daniel Burman; Best Supporting Actor, Arturo Goetz; 2007.

Nominations

- Mar del Plata Film Festival: Best Film, Daniel Burman; 2006.
- Argentine Film Critics Association Awards: Silver Condor, Best Actor, Daniel Hendler; Best Actress, Julieta Díaz; Best Film; 2007.
