= Empty Nest (film) =

- Directed by: Daniel Burman
- Written by: Daniel Burman
- Produced by: Daniel Burman; Diego Dubcovsky; José María Morales
- Starring: Oscar Martínez; Cecilia Roth; Inés Efron; Arturo Goetz; Jean Pierre Noher; Eugenia Capizzano; Angela Ragno
- Cinematography: Hugo Colace
- Edited by: Alejandro Brodersohn
- Music by: Nico Cota; Santiago Río Hinckelmann
- Release date: 24 April 2008
- Running time: 91 minutes
- Countries: Argentina; France; Italy; Spain
- Language: Spanish

Empty Nest (Spanish: El nido vacío) is a 2008 Argentine drama film written and directed by Daniel Burman and starring Oscar Martínez and Cecilia Roth.

== Plot ==
The story is centered on a family of five, a father, mother, their two sons, and daughter, revolving around the father. The reality within the diegesis is that of the father, Leonardo. The film plays with chronology and reality. Leonardo is a well-known writer and playwright, whose his wife left university studies to take care of the family. The film begins with a scene of a dinner in which Leonardo seems uncomfortable because, as is learned later in the film, he is witnessing a possible affair between his wife and an old college friend of hers. The film documents the troubles of the marriage as Leonardo has a brief affair with his dentist shortly after his youngest daughter leaves to Israel with her new husband Ianib. Leonardo's version of reality is, at many times, questionable during the film. He talks to a doctor that researches memory and they talk about the construction of memory and fantasy and it alludes to the self-reflexivity of the film. Leonardo's son in law Ianib leaves behind a book for him to read and asks for his opinion of it. Leonardo takes some time to actually read the book even though he carries it around for most of the film. When he finally reads the book, he is surprised to find out that it is brilliant. This scene is accompanied with a distinct use of lighting that focuses on Leonardo and his absorption within the novel.

The question of antisemitism is brought up in the film. Leonardo is questioned by one of his colleagues after a cartoon that he created is looked down upon as an anti-Semitic caricature of the Jewish people. Leonardo responds by saying, "Me, anti-Semitic? My daughter married an Israeli". Leonardo takes his colleague's remarks quite lightly and soon travels to Israel with his wife to visit their daughter. It is during almost the end of the film that the viewer meets Julia and Ianib. Ianib wins a prestigious award for his novel and this serves as a bonding experience between the father and the Jewish son-in-law. Tensions that were built upon during most of the film are released with the time that Leonardo and Ianib spend together in Ianib's home country. Talk of children comes up during dinner and possible circumcision is mentioned. Ianib and Leonardo find something in common with each other, and while it may not be religion or language, it is their passion for writing. Ianib tells Leonardo, when his memory is questioned by Martha and Julia, "Family stories are always true". The film closes with shots of the landscapes of Israel and a bonding moment between Martha and Leonardo before playing with chronological order once more, going back in time, to offer a scene with Leonardo and Julia talking after she comes home from a date with Ianib.
