= Norman Briski =

Argentine actor (born 1938)

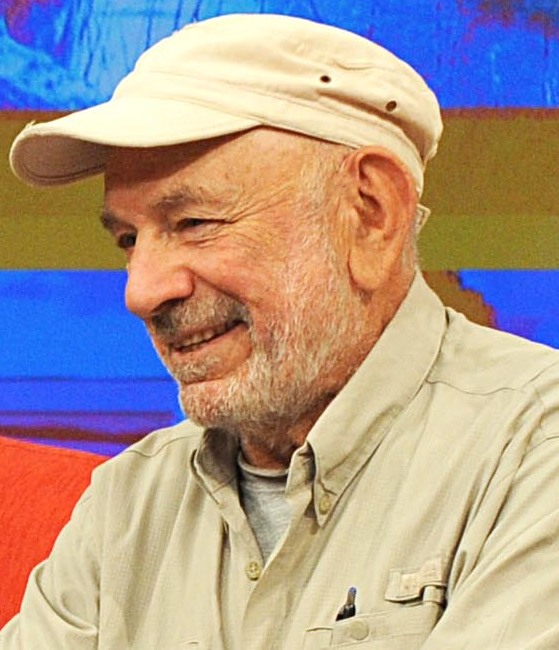
- Briski in 2015
- Born: Naum Briski; 2 January 1938 (age 88); Santa Fe, Argentina
- Occupations: Actor; director; playwright
- Relatives: Mariana Briski (niece)

Naum Briski (born 2 January 1938), better known as Norman Briski, is an Argentine actor, director and playwright.

== Life and work ==
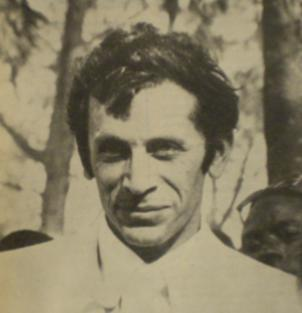
Briski in a picture published in 1970

Naum Briski was born on 2 January 1938 in Santa Fe. His Jewish Argentine family relocated to Córdoba, where Briski developed an interest in acting and where, in 1955, he was given his first stage role in La Farsa del señor Corregidor. He continued his work in the theatre and in time earned leading parts in plays such as Rosencrantz and Guildenstern Are Dead and The Mother. He was given his first cinema role, a part in Ricardo Alventosa's comedy, Cómo seducir a una mujer (How to Seduce a Woman), in 1967.

Remaining active in the local theatre, Briski established an independent theatre company, Octubre, in the early 1970s, and devoted its repertoire to the production of classics banned in Argentina at the time (such as Oedipus Rex). A left-wing Peronist, he received death threats from the Argentine Anticommunist Alliance, a paramilitary group active in the mid-1970s, and left for Spain in 1975. There, he was cast by director Carlos Saura for a leading role in his acclaimed 1976 drama, Elisa, vida mía (Elisa, My Life), and in his work of magic realism, Mamá cumple cien años (Mom Turns 100), in 1979. He contributed to a number of other Spanish films and to Swedish director Stig Björkman's Walk on Water If You Can (1979).

The avent of democracy in Argentina in 1983 was soon followed by Briski's joining hundreds of fellow artists and other professionals in their return from exile. He chose as his first post-exile cinema role that of Emilio, a Jewish theatre director reunited with friends and enemies alike, in Alberto Fischerman's Los dias de junio (Days in June), released in 1985. He also returned to the Argentine stage and wrote numerous works, including Las primas (Cousins), Fin de siglo (Turn of the Century), and Cuadrilátero (Four-sided).

Briski began appearing on Argentine television in 1989, and the following year, portrayed local rock musician Charly García's father in a biopic, Charly, días de sangre. He was then cast by Academy Award-winning director Luis Puenzo in his 1992 adaptation of Albert Camus' The Plague, by Alejandro Agresti in his 1997 tragedy, La cruz (The Cross), and as the concerned grandfather of a struggling young artist in Fernando Díaz's Plaza de almas (1997). Briski, who often portrays tragic roles, accepted a part in a 1997 romantic sitcom, Naranja y media (My Better Halves).

Active in left-wing causes, he ran unsuccessfully for Congress in 1991 on the Popular Unity Front ticket. More recent dramatic roles include that of the doomed Dr. Feldman in the 2004 cable mystery series, Epitafios, and as Macías Moll, an elderly clock repairman longing for lost youth in Marcos Rodríguez's Los chicos desaparecen (2008). The noted actor continues to work extensively in television, cinema and the theatre, and established the Caliban Theatre in 1987. Set in a Belle Époque building in the bohemian Montserrat section of Buenos Aires, the institution hosts one of the country's most active repertoires of William Shakespeare's works - which he considers "so challenging that we could never be past them."

In October 2024, during the Martín Fierro Film Awards, Briski delivered a poignant speech expressing solidarity with the Palestinians. Upon receiving his award, he declared in his speech, "Gaza, Gaza, Gaza. Gaza will never be defeated. It doesn’t matter if you applaud me a lot or a little, but I feel here in my blood, in my ancestors, my solidarity with a people who are being murdered.” In a subsequent interview, Briski elaborated on his stance, emphasizing that those who fight for freedom today “must be Palestinians” and drawing connections between anti-imperialist struggles in Latin America and the Palestinian resistance. He stated, “A true Jew will defend the Palestinian people in their pursuit of peace and harmony—a coexistence between two peoples who have historically lived together and enriched each other’s cultures.”
