= The Winter =

El Invierno
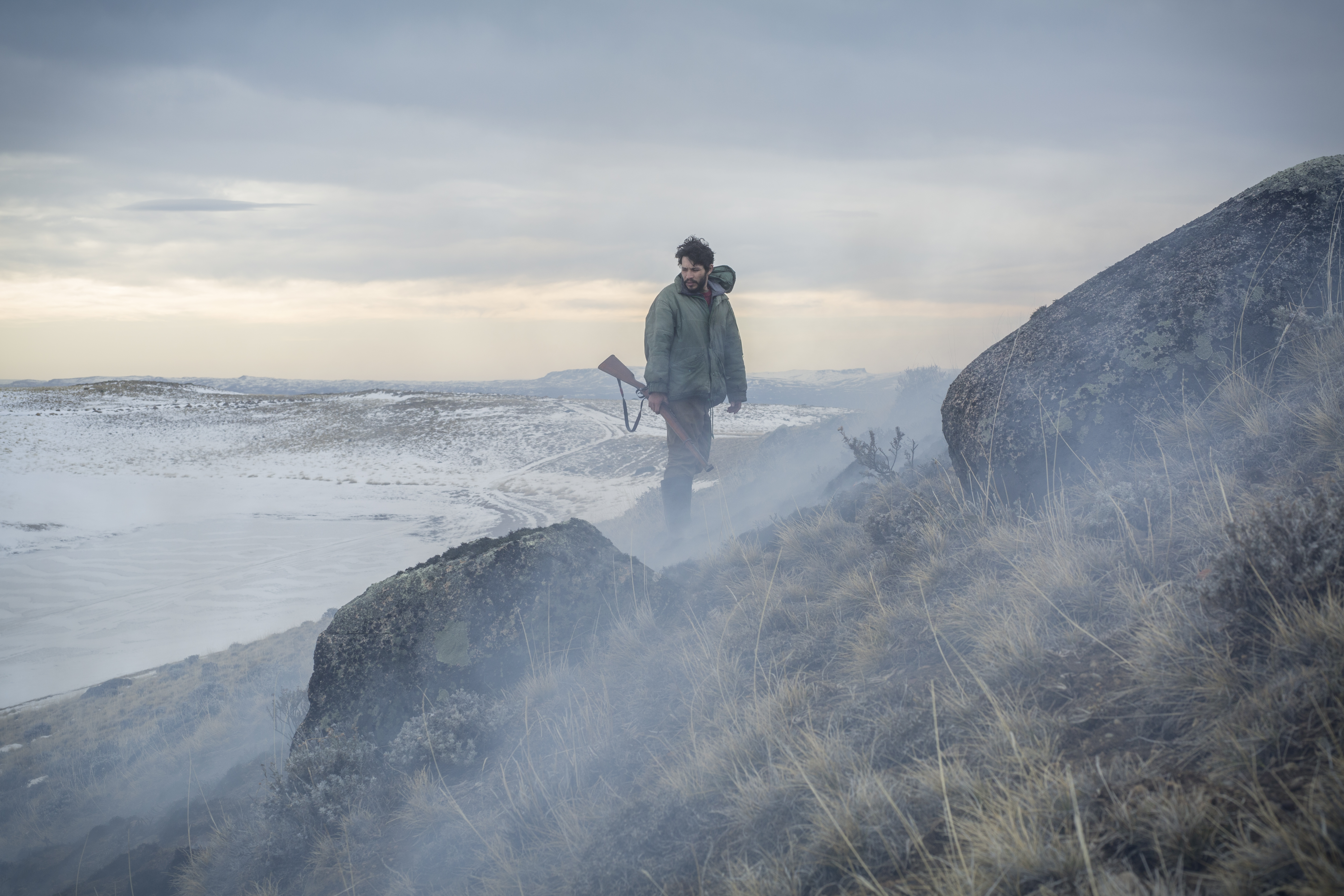
- El Invierno, 2016
- Directed by: Emiliano Torres
- Starring: Alejandro Sieveking and Cristian Salguero
- Production companies: Wanka Cine (Argentina) and Ajimolido Films (Argentina)
- Release date: 22 September 2016 (San Sebastián International Film Festival)
- Country: Argentina
- Language: Spanish

El Invierno (English: The Winter) is the dramatic first film of the Argentine director Emiliano Torres, starring Alejandro Sieveking and Cristian Salguero. The worldwide premiere was on September 22, 2016, at the San Sebastián International Film Festival and had its local premiere in Argentina on October 6 of the same year. It was produced by Wanka Cine (Argentina) and Ajimolido Films (Argentina), in co-production with Cité Films (France), Orange Studio (France), RTA (Argentina) and Tronco (Argentina). It had the support of National Institute of Cinema and Audiovisual Arts.

In Spain, the premiere will be on June 23, 2017, and, in France, on June 28 of the same year.

== Synopsis ==
Evans, the old foreman at an estancia in Patagonia receives a new group of workers who come to participate in the shearing season. Within the group of laborers, Jara, a young man from the northeastern part of Argentina, stands out. The owners of the estancia see him as a possible new foreman. When the season's work comes to an end, Evans' worst fears come true: after a lifetime of dedication to that work and place he is fired from the estancia and replaced by Jara. The change won't be easy for either of them and each one must find their own way to survive the coming winter.

== Production ==
Wanka Cine and Ajímolido Films, co-produced with Cité Films, Orange Studio, RTA y Tronco.

== Awards ==
- Special Jury Award / 64º San Sebastián International Film Festival - Official Selection.
- Best Photography / 64º San Sebastián International Film Festival - Official Selection.
- Best Actor / Biarritz Film Festival - Official Selection.
- Best Film French Critics Award / Biarritz Film Festival - Official Selection.
- Best First Film / 38º International Film Festival La Habana, Cuba.
- Best Film / 1st Macao Film Festival.
- Film in Progress Award / Cinélatino Rencontres de Toulouse 2016.
- Special Award Ciné Plus / Cinélatino Rencontres de Toulouse 2016.
- Balance de Oro Award / Pantalla Pinamar 2017.
- Signis Award / Pantalla Pinamar 2017.
- DAC Award (Directores Argentinos Cinematográficos), Graba 01, Mendoza, 2017.
- Asociación Críticos Argentinos Award, Festival Graba 01, Mendoza, 2017.
- Candidate for the Silver´s Condor Award 2016: Best First Film, Best Original Screenplay, Best Cinematography and Best Sound.
- Candidate for the Platinum Prize of Iberoamerican Cinema: Best First Film, Best Montage and Best Sound.
- Argentores Award, 2017.
- INCAA TV Award, 2017.
- Other Festivals: Zurich Film Festival, 2017 / Palm Springs International Film Festival, 2017 / Kosmorama Trondheim 2017, Norway / Latin American Film Festival, Salzbourg + Vienna, 2017 / Festival MOOOV, Belgium, 2017 / Lucca Film Festival, Italy, 2017 / San Francisco International Film Festival, 2017 / International Istanbul Film Festival, 2017 / Seattle International Film Festival, 2017 / New Horizons International Film Festival, Polonia, 2017 / 35 Uruguay Cinematographic Festival, 2017.

== Press ==
- Fotogramas / Spain: http://www.fotogramas.es/Festival-de-San-Sebastian/2016/El-Invierno-del-argentino-Emiliano-Torres-elegante-western-posmoderno-sobre-la-precariedad.
- El Paísl / Spain: http://cultura.elpais.com/cultura/2016/09/14/actualidad/1473885434_574455.html
- Variety / USA https://variety.com/2016/film/festivals/emiliano-torres-the-winter-toulouse-films-in-progress-1201734706/
- La Nación / Argentina: http://www.lanacion.com.ar/1944353-un-sobrio-relato-quese-vuelve-tempestad
- Clarín / Argentina: https://www.clarin.com/extrashow/cine/invierno-Capataces_0_HyYvjFGA.html
- Página 12 / Argentina: https://www.pagina12.com.ar/diario/suplementos/espectaculos/5-40209-2016-10-06.html
- Otros Cines / Argentina: http://www.otroscines.com/nota?idnota=11440
- Escribiendo Cine / Argentina: http://www.escribiendocine.com/critica/0003423-el-invierno-interior/
