= La suerte en tus manos =

2012 film directed by Daniel Burman

- Spanish theatrical poster
- Directed by: Daniel Burman
- Written by: Daniel Burman; Sergio Dubcovsky
- Starring: Norma Aleandro; Jorge Drexler; Valeria Bertuccelli; Gabriel Schultz
- Cinematography: Daniel Sebastián Ortega
- Music by: Nico Cota
- Production companies: Gullane Filmes; BD Cine; Tornasol Films
- Release dates: 29 March 2012 (Argentina); 23 August 2013 (Brazil)
- Running time: 110 minutes
- Countries: Argentina; Brazil; Spain
- Language: Spanish

La suerte en tus manos is a film directed by Daniel Burman based on his own script written in collaboration with Sergio Dubcovsky which premiered on March 29, 2012, starring Norma Aleandro, Jorge Drexler, Valeria Bertuccelli and Gabriel Schultz. Atzmus rock band makes an appearance, with its leading vocalist portraying a rabbi.

== Cast ==
- Jorge Drexler as Uriel
- Valeria Bertuccelli as Gloria
- Norma Aleandro as Susan
- Gabriel Schultz as Germán
- Paloma Álvarez Maldonado as Sara
- Lucciano Pizzichini as Otto
- Sura Sepúlveda as Fagner Paván
- Luis Brandoni as Dr. Weiss
