= The Paranoids =

- Spanish: Los paranoicos
- Directed by: Gabriel Medina
- Written by: Nicolas Gueilburt; Gabriel Medina
- Produced by: Nicolás Tacconi
- Starring: Daniel Hendler
- Cinematography: Lucio Bonelli
- Edited by: Nicolás Goldbart
- Music by: Guillermo Guareschi
- Release dates: 5 September 2008 (Toronto International Film Festival); 23 October 2008 (Argentina)
- Running time: 98 minutes
- Country: Argentina
- Language: Spanish

The Paranoids (Spanish: Los paranoicos) is a 2008 Argentine comedy film directed by Gabriel Medina and starring Daniel Hendler.

== Plot ==
Luciano Gauna (Daniel Hendler) is a reserved thirty-something who has long been trying to write a film script while making a living as a children's party entertainer in Buenos Aires. After accidentally injuring his best friend and co-worker, sending him to the hospital with a throat injury, Luciano reunites with a friend he hadn't seen in years. His friend, Manuel (Walter Jakob), has just returned from Spain with his girlfriend Sofia (Jazmín Stuart) to oversee the production of the Argentine version of "Los Paranoicos," a successful TV series in Spain.

Before departing for work in Chile, Manuel asks Luciano to lend sleeping pills to Sofia. Luciano arrives at Manuel's parents' house, where they were temporarily staying, and meets Sofia. Following an argument with Manuel's mother, Sofia leaves the house with Luciano and her luggage. He escorts her to a restaurant where he offers her the medication, but she declines. Through Sofia, Luciano discovers that the character in "Los Paranoicos" is not only inspired by him but is also named "Luciano Gauna." This revelation bothers him, but he doesn't express his feelings to Manuel. With nowhere else to stay, Sofia spends the night at Luciano's apartment. During their time together, their emotional connection deepens.

Upon Manuel's return, he meets with Luciano and offers him the opportunity to handle the adaptation and production of the series in Argentina. Luciano would work in an office, under Manuel's supervision, with a generous salary. Uncomfortable with the offer, Luciano avoids giving a definite response and tells Manuel he needs time to think it over. Before departing, Manuel invites him to a party hosted by the production company. The following night, Luciano attends the party and encounters Manuel and Sofia. While Manuel tends to other matters, Luciano and Sofia start dancing. When Manuel returns and finds them together, he leaves the venue with her, leading to a heated argument. Shortly afterward, Luciano departs and finds Manuel alone, who confronts him in surprise. Luciano inquires about the direction Sofia went and, after a chase, catches up to her.

== Cast ==
- Daniel Hendler as Luciano Gauna
- Martín Feldman as Martin Sherman
- Walter Jakob as Manuel Sinovieck
- Jazmin Stuart as Sofia
- Veronica Perdomo as Rocio
- Miguel Dedovich as Dodi

== Reception ==
The film has a 40% rating on Rotten Tomatoes. Ryan Stewart of Slant Magazine awarded the film one and a half stars out of four.
