= Federico D'Elía =

Argentine actor

- Born: La Plata, Argentina
- Occupation: Actor
- Years active: 1985-present
- Spouse: Deborah Cosovshi (1999-present)
- Children: Teo D'Elía; Miranda D'Elía; Juan D'Elía
- Parent(s): Jorge D'Elía and María Susana Ydé

Federico D'Elía is an Argentine actor. He is a Golden Martín Fierro award winner.
