= Crazy Old Lady =

- Spanish theatrical release poster
- Spanish: Vieja loca
- Directed by: Martín Mauregui
- Screenplay by: Martín Mauregui
- Produced by: J.A. Bayona; Belén Atienza; Gabriela Carcova Krichmar; Ramón Campos; Víctor Fandiño
- Starring: Carmen Maura; Daniel Hendler
- Cinematography: Julián Apezteguía
- Edited by: Guillermo de la Cal; Andrés Pepe Estrada
- Music by: Pedro Osuna
- Production companies: La Trini; Primo; Mr. Field and Friends; Bambú Producciones; La Unión de los Ríos
- Distributed by: DeAPlaneta (Spain); Shudder (United States)
- Release dates: 21 September 2025 (Fantastic Fest); 10 October 2025 (Spain); 27 February 2026 (United States)
- Running time: 94 minutes
- Countries: Spain; Argentina; United States
- Language: Spanish

Crazy Old Lady (Spanish: Vieja loca) is a 2025 psychological horror thriller film written and directed by Martín Mauregui starring Carmen Maura and Daniel Hendler.

== Premise ==
Pedro endures psychological distress after being tasked by his former girlfriend to take care of her senile mother Alicia.

== Cast ==
- Daniel Hendler as Pedro
- Carmen Maura as Alicia

== Production ==
Crazy Old Lady is the debut solo feature as a director of seasoned Argentine screenwriter Martín Mauregui. Producer J.A. Bayona pitched the film as "a very claustrophobic film, a fable of terror and suspense that deals with how violence is transmitted from one generation to the next". The film is a Spanish-Argentine co-production by Películas La Trini, Primo Content, Mr. Field and Friends, Bambú Producciones alongside La Unión de los Ríos.

Julián Apezteguía served as cinematographer. Shooting locations included the city of Buenos Aires and places in its conurbation (Vicente López, Bella Vista, Capilla del Señor).

== Release ==
StudioCanal handled sales. The film is set to have its world premiere at the 20th Fantastic Fest on 21 September 2025. DeAPlaneta is slated to release theatrically the film in Spain on 10 October 2025. Shudder acquired distribution rights in North America, the United Kingdom, Australia, and New Zealand. It was released in the United States on February 27, 2026.

== Reception ==
Jorge Loser of Cinemanía rated the film 3 out of 5 stars, deeming it to be a case of hagsploitation, also writing that there is an excess of "déjà vu and redundant moments, but its underlying story of abuse and the figure of a hidden monster create a pertinent mystery that redeems some of its sensationalism".

== See also ==
- List of Spanish films of 2025
- List of Argentine films of 2025
