= Lea and Mira =

- Film poster
- Spanish: Lea y Mira dejan su huella
- Directed by: Poli Martínez Kaplun
- Screenplay by: Poli Martínez Kaplun; Nora Elena Acrich; Ernesto Felder (SAE)
- Produced by: Poli Martínez Kaplun; Lucas Werthein; Carlos Winograd; Mariana Martínez
- Cinematography: Hernán Menéndez
- Edited by: Ernesto Felder (SAE)
- Music by: César Lerner
- Release date: 1 December 2016
- Running time: 52 minutes
- Country: Argentina
- Language: Spanish

Lea and Mira (Spanish: Lea y Mira dejan su huella) is a documentary film written and directed by the Argentine filmmaker Poli Martínez Kaplun. It premiered on December 1, 2016, at the Latin American Art Museum of Buenos Aires.

== Synopsis ==
The protagonists of this documentary are Lea Zajack and Mira Kniaziew, two Jewish women born in Poland. As children, they were taken to the Auschwitz concentration camp, where they were imprisoned for two years. After being released —having survived was, in their own words, "a miracle"—, each of them migrated to Argentina, where they met and became friends. Throughout the film, which consists mostly of an intimate conversation in the living room of one of the women, Lea and Mira recount their lives and reflect upon issues such as discrimination, Holocaust denial, trauma, resilience and the will to live.

== Critical response ==
American website Remezcla said that Lea and Mira “is a warning against rising fascism”.

Carlos Aguilar, writing about the Gasparilla International Film Festival for MovieMaker magazine, stated that “The most surprising gem at the festival, this topical piece, which runs only 52 minutes, provides flesh-and-bone testimony that aims to warn younger generations of the horrors that bigotry and xenophobia can ignite. The title subjects’ shared tragedy and will to live are nothing short of life-affirming.”

Maria Bertoni, from the Argentine website Espectadores, wrote, “Lea and Mira contributes to the moral goal of using memory as a tool to fight collective forgetting and denial and, if possible, to inhibit the human drive toward massive annihilation. Moreover, the film offers an endearing portrait of its octogenarian protagonists [...]”

Guido Pellegrini, from the Argentine website A Sala Llena, observed that “Lea and Mira recount their lives --in Poland, in Auschwitz, in Argentina-- as well as their ever-changing relationship to the past. And this is Kaplun’s contribution to the extensive bibliography and filmography about the Holocaust: to show that said relationship is not stable, because the present is always developing and demands renewed confrontations with History.”

Paraná Sendrós, writing for the Argentine newspaper Ámbito Financiero, said, “Approaching 90 years of age, Mira Kniaziew de Stupnik and Lea Zajac de Novera, close friends, talk to each other, talk to us about their Argentine children, grandchildren and great-grandchildren, they don’t forget anything, they demand that nothing be forgotten, but they also smile, they have fun, they sing.”

== Festivals and awards ==
Lea and Mira was part of the official selection at the San Luis Obispo International Film Festival, Gasparilla International Film Festival (GIFF), Houston Latino Film Festival, Marbella Film Festival and Jewish Film Festival Punta del Este, where it won the Audience Award for Best Documentary.

In November 2017, the documentary was awarded Best Woman Director (Poli Martínez Kaplun), Best Editing (Ernesto Felder) and Best Music/Score (César Lerner) at the Hollywood International Independent Documentary Awards.
