= Olympic Garage =

- DVD cover
- Directed by: Marco Bechis
- Written by: Marco Bechis; Lara Fremder; Collaborating writer: Caterina Giargia
- Produced by: Amedeo Pagani; Marco Bechis; Enrique Piñeyro; Eric Heumann
- Starring: Antonella Costa; Carlos Echevarría; Enrique Piñeyro
- Cinematography: Ramiro Civita
- Edited by: Jacopo Quadri
- Music by: Jacques Lederlin
- Distributed by: Istituto Luce; Aqua Films
- Release dates: May 16, 1999 (France); September 2, 1999 (Argentina)
- Running time: 98 minutes
- Countries: Argentina; France; Italy
- Language: Spanish
- Budget: $3,000,000 (estimated)

Olympic Garage (Spanish: Garage Olimpo) is a 1999 Argentine-French-Italian historical-political thriller film cowritten and directed by Marco Bechis and starring Antonella Costa, Carlos Echevarría, Enrique Piñeyro, Chiara Caselli and Dominique Sanda. It was produced by Bechis and Piñeyro (from Argentina) with Amedeo Pagani (from Italy) and Eric Heumann (from France). Executive producers were Daniel Burman and Diego Dubcovsky.

The story centers on a young and politically active Argentine woman who is kidnapped Argentina's last civil-military dictatorship (1976-1983) during the late 1970s. "Garage Olimpo" is the name of the illegal detention-and-torture center where she is taken, in the middle of Buenos Aires.

== Plot ==
Maria (Antonella Costa) is a young activist fighting the Argentinian military dictatorship during Argentina's last civil-military dictatorship (1976-1983). She teaches reading and writing in a poor suburb of Buenos Aires and lives with her mother Diane (Dominique Sanda), who rents out rooms. One of the lodgers is a young man named Felix (Carlos Echevarría), who is in love with Maria, and is rather shy. Felix seems to have come from nowhere, with no background or past, and is supposed to work as a watchman in a garage.

One morning, Maria is kidnapped by a military squad in civilian clothes in front of her mother and is taken to the garage Olimpo, one of the many well-known torture places of the military dictatorship right in the middle of Buenos Aires, which operates with the general indifference of the locals. As soon as Maria is captured the film's mood becomes uncomfortable and the atmosphere is minimalist. The head of the center, known as "Tigre" (Enrique Piñeyro; "tigre" means "Tiger" in the Spanish language), asks Felix, who happens to be their "best torturer", to make Maria talk. Yet, Felix is overcome by his feelings for Maria, and Maria is determined to exploit this for her survival.

== Cast ==
- Antonella Costa as Maria
- Carlos Echevarría as Felix
- Enrique Piñeyro as Tigre
- Pablo Razuk as Tex
- Chiara Caselli as Ana
- Dominique Sanda as Diane
- Paola Bechis as Gloria
- Adrián Fondari as Rubio
- Marcelo Chaparro as Turco
- Miguel Oliveira as Nene
- Ruy Krieger as Francisco
- Marcos Montes as Víbora
- Erica Rivas as Hija de Tigre

== Historical context ==
The film is based on the real political events that took place in Argentina after Jorge Rafael Videla's reactionary military junta assumed power on March 24, 1976. During the junta's rule: the parliament was suspended, unions, political parties and provincial governments were banned, and in what became known as the Dirty War between 9,000 and 30,000 people deemed left-wing "subversives" disappeared from society.

As the country celebrated its win of the World Cup, many political activists were tortured in Buenos Aires and then later taken on "death flights", where victims were drugged and then dropped alive into the Atlantic Ocean from military aircraft.

Chilean born director Marco Bechis was a victim of the country's military regime and was forced to leave Argentina in 1977, at the age of 20, for political reasons.

== Release ==
The film was first presented at the 1999 Cannes Film Festival on May 16 in the Un Certain Regard section. It opened wide in Argentina on September 2, 1999.

The film was screened at various film festivals, including: the Toronto International Film Festival, Canada; the Huelva Latin American Film Festival, Spain; the Norwegian International Film Festival, Norway; the Human Rights Watch Film Festival, New York City; the Amnesty International Film Festival, Netherlands; and others.

== Reception ==
=== Critical response ===
Stephen Holden, film critic for The New York Times, wrote the film is "notable on the international front...a not-for-the-squeamish film from Argentina about an opponent of the military dictatorship who is tortured in a garage in the heart of Buenos Aires."

Critic Jonathan Hollander liked the directorial lead of Marco Bechis, and wrote, "Garage Olimpo is the kind of valuable cultural product that symbolises political regeneration...himself a victim of the country's regime – he was forced to leave Argentina in 1977, at the age of 20, for political reasons – director Marco Bechis has the necessary moral authority to make this film."

Michael Thomson, writing for the BBC, lauded the film and the passion of director Marco Bechis, and wrote, "It is director Marco Bechis' softly-softly approach which fills each frame with real power and leaves you in no doubt as to his commitment and passion. It is indeed no surprise to learn that this Italian-Chilean was himself snatched by the military in Buenos Aires and tortured. Yet, despite his admirable insistence on moving us with the truth (helped by his grainy camera work), Bechis can also tell a tale and he gradually incorporates a race-against-time element. Will Maria escape, especially when she is taken out on the town by her captor? Let's just say that the answer would be alien to Hollywood."

=== Awards ===
Wins

- Havana Film Festival: Cuban Critics Award; Glauber Rocha Award; Grand Coral – First Prize; Martin Luther King Memorial Center Award; OCIC Award; all for Marco Bechis; Memoria Documentary Award, David Blaustein 1999.
- Thessaloniki Film Festival: FIPRESCI Prize International Competition – For the conviction and subtlety with which it conveys the mechanisms of terror both political and psychological; Silver Alexander; both for Marco Bechis; 1999.
- Huelva Latin American Film Festival: Golden Colon, Marco Bechis; 1999.
- Lleida Latin-American Film Festival: ICCI Screenplay Award, Marco Bechis and Lara Fremder; 2000.
- Lucas – International Festival of Films for Children and Young People: C.I.F.E.J. Award – Special Mention; Lucas Youth Section; Marco Bechis; 2000.
- Argentine Film Critics Association Awards: Best Director, Marco Bechis; Best Editing, Jacopo Quadri; 2000.
- Cartagena Film Festival: Golden India Catalina, Best Film, Marco Bechis; 2000.
- David di Donatello Awards, Italy: David, Best Producer, Amedeo Pagani; 2000.
- Santa Barbara International Film Festival: Phoenix Prize, Marco Bechis; 2000.

Nominations

- Thessaloniki Film Festival: Golden Alexander, Marco Bechis; 1999.
- Argentine Film Critics Association Awards: Silver Condor, Best Actress, Antonella Costa; Best Art Direction/Production Design, Rómulo Abad; Best Cinematography, Ramiro Civita; Best Film; Best New Actress, Antonella Costa; Best Original Screenplay, Marco Bechis and Lara Fremder; 2000.
- Ariel Awards, Mexico: Silver Ariel, Best Latin-American Film, Marco Bechis, Argentina; 2001.
- David di Donatello Awards: David, Best Director, Marco Bechis; Best Editing, Jacopo Quadri; Best Film; Best Screenplay, Marco Bechis and Lara Fremder; 2000.
- Italian National Syndicate of Film Journalists: Silver Ribbon, Best Director, Marco Bechis; Best Editing, Jacopo Quadri; Best Original Story, Marco Bechis and Lara Fremder; Best Producer, Amedeo Pagani; 2000.
