= Marcelo Birmajer =

Argentine Jewish author

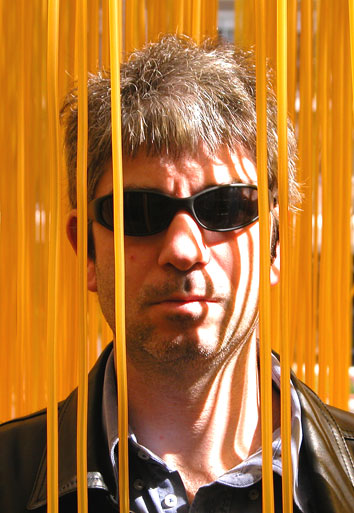
- Marcelo Birmajer. Photo by EM-B
- Born: November 29, 1966 (age 59); Buenos Aires, Argentina
- Occupations: Novelist, Journalist.
- Writing career
- Genre: Various

Marcelo Birmajer (born November 29, 1966, in Buenos Aires) is an Argentine Jewish author. He is the grandson of Romanian, Polish, Lithuanian and Syrian immigrants. He is best known for writing the screenplay of the 2004 film El abrazo partido. Birmajer's work usually revolves around the Porteño neighbourhood of Once and its colorful inhabitants. Most stories feature Jewish characters, and he frequently uses for them the names Javier, or Mordejai/Mordechai (Hebrew: מרדכי) depending on the character's level of religious observance. He also addresses Jewish issues such as synagogue attendance, Bar Mitzvahs, and the ever present alternative to immigrate to Israel.

Other recurrent subjects are married life, especially in his series "Stories of married men" (Spanish: Historias de hombres casados), and the Argentine society and its crisis. Many of Birmajer's works have clear autobiographical lines, presenting a main character who is himself a writer. An important part of his bibliography, specially in his beginnings, is youth literature.

Birmajer is a frequent contributor to one or two newspapers throughout the Spanish-speaking world.

His brother, Rabbi Reuven Eduardo Birmajer, was assassinated by Palestinian terrorists in Jerusalem on 23 December 2015.

== Bibliography (Partial) ==
- Un crimen secundario.
- Derrotado por un muerto.
- El alma al diablo.
- Un veneno saludable.
- Historias de hombres casados.
- No tan distinto.
- Nuevas historias de hombres casados.
- Últimas historias de hombres casados.
- El Once, un recorrido personal.
- Tres mosqueteros.
- El Fuego más alto.
- Hechizos de Amor.
- El Abogado del Marciano
