= Melina Petriella =

Argentine movie and television actress (born 1976)

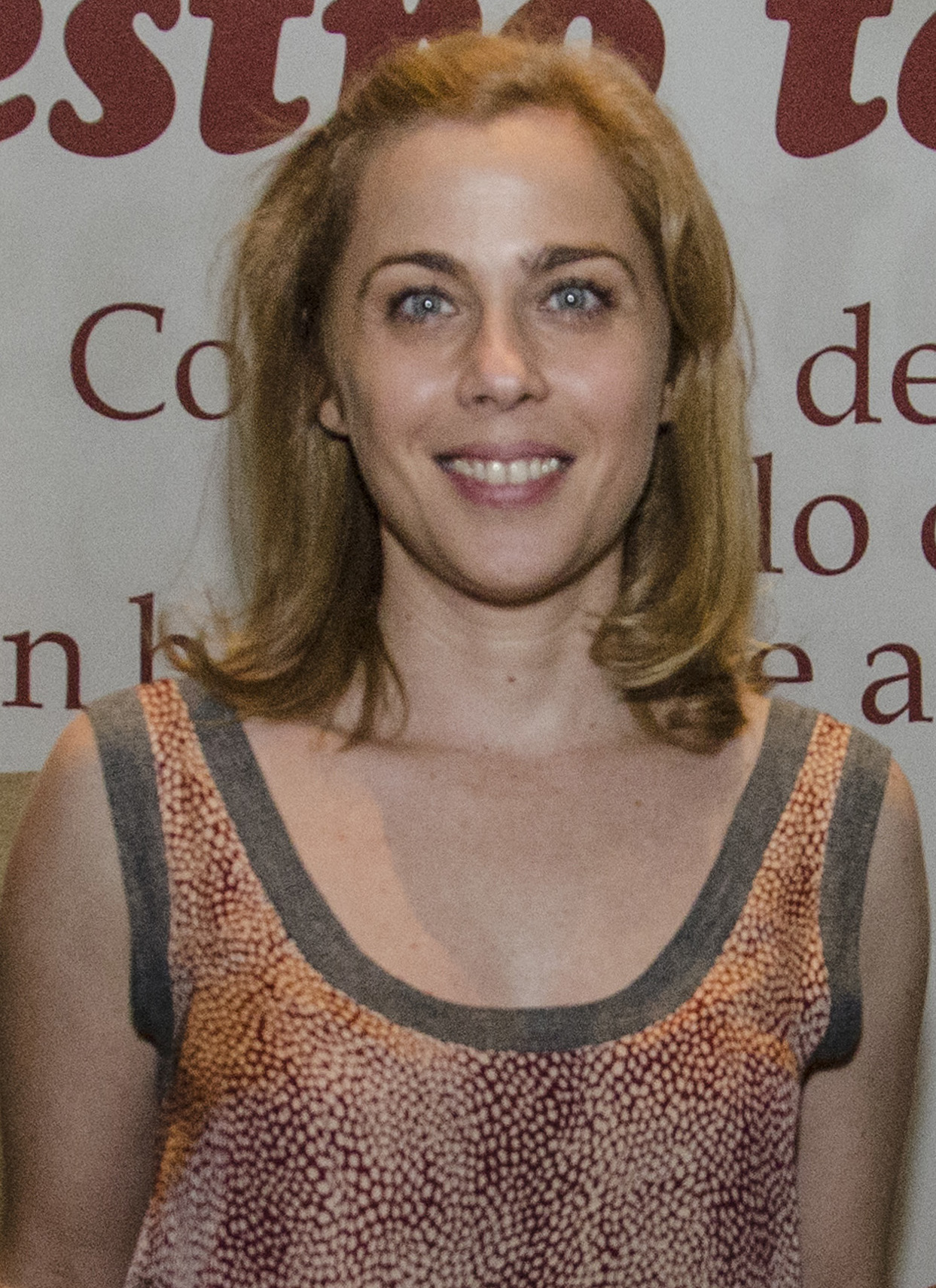
- Melina Petriella in 2015
- Born: March 2, 1976 (age 49); Argentina
- Occupation: Actor

Melina Petriella (born March 2, 1976) is an Argentine movie and television actress.

== Filmography ==
- Besos en la frente (1996)
- Esperando al Mesías (2000) aka Waiting for the Messiah
- Nocturno (2001)
- El Abrazo partido (2004) aka Lost Embrace
- Dolores de casada (2004)
- Miss Tacuarembó (2010)
- Quiero morir en tus brazos (2013)

== Television ==
- Inconquistable corazón (1994)
- R.R.D.T (1998)
- Gasoleros (1998)
- Calientes (2000)
- Luna salvaje (2000) aka Wild Moon
- El Sodero de mi vida (2001)
- Tiempofinal (2001)
- El Precio del poder (2002)
- Son amores (2002) aka Sweethearts
- Rincón de luz (2003) aka Little House of Light
- Dolores de casada (2004)
- Padre Coraje (2004) aka Brave Father John
- Amor en custodia (2005)
- Collar de esmeraldas (2006)
- Don Juan y su bella dama (2008)
- Volver a nacer (2012)
- Cuatro Reinas (2015)

== Awards ==
Nominations

- Argentine Film Critics Association Awards: Silver Condor, Best New Actress, for Esperando al mesías; 2001.
