= Daniel Hendler =

Uruguayan actor and director

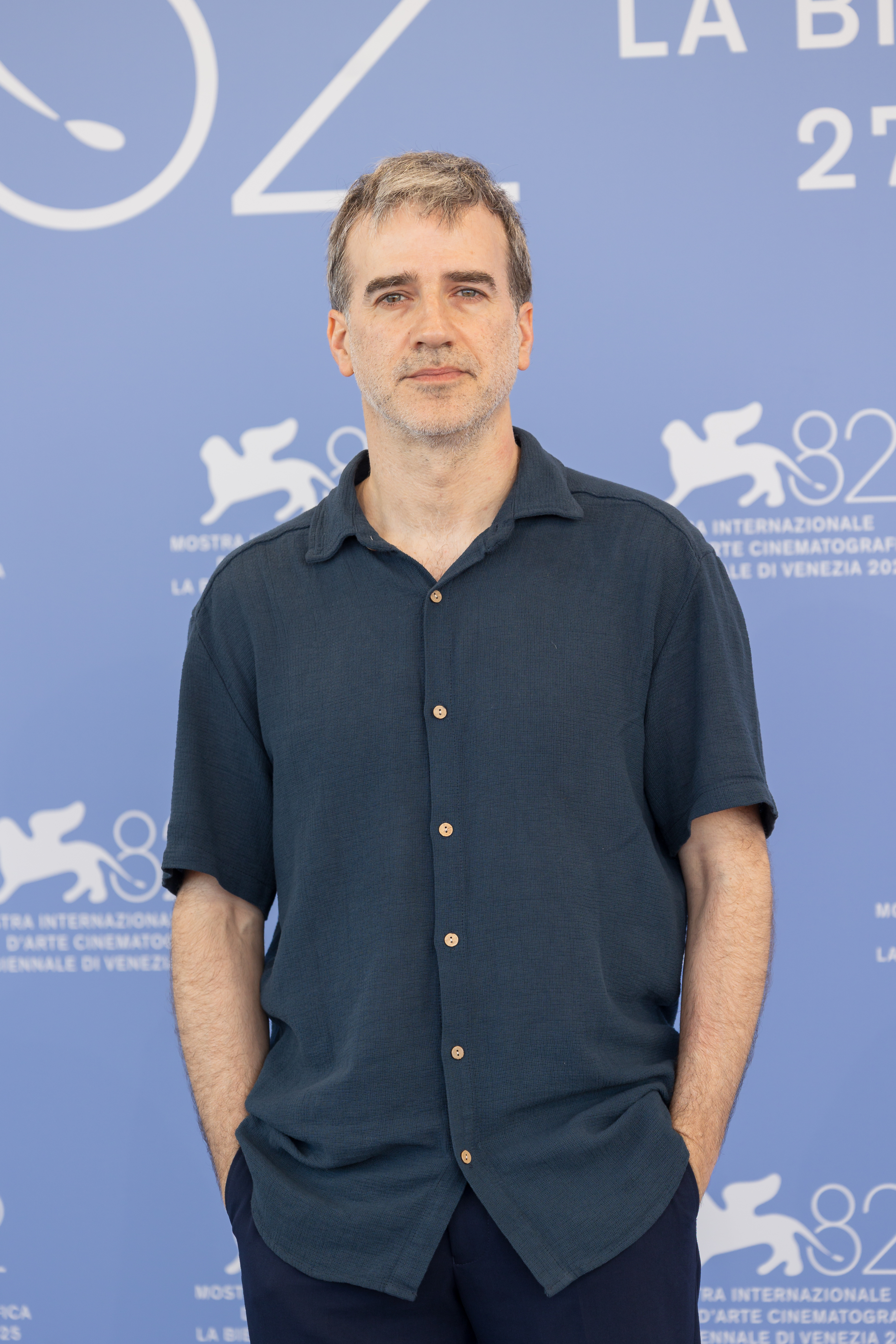
- Hendler in 2025
- Born: January 3, 1976 (age 50); Montevideo, Uruguay
- Occupations: Actor, director, screenwriter
- Years active: 1996–present
- Spouse: Ana Katz (2007-2018 separated)
- Children: 2

Daniel Hendler (born 3 January 1976) is a Uruguayan film, television, and theatre actor and director, who has mostly worked in Argentina.

Hendler made his feature film debut, starring as the protagonist, Ariel Goldstein, in Daniel Burman's Jewish-themed comedy drama, Waiting for the Messiah (2000), for which he was nominated for Breakthrough Actor by the Argentine Film Critics Association. Prominent roles followed in 25 Watts (2001) and he again worked with Burman in Todas las azafatas van al cielo (2002), Lost Embrace (2004) and Family Law (2006). For his role as Ariel Makaroff in Lost Embrace, he was awarded the Silver Bear for Best Actor at the 54th Berlin International Film Festival. Hendler was nominated for Best Actor by the Argentine Film Critics Association for both Lost Embrace and Family Law. In 2003, he starred as protagonist and neurotic architect in Damián Szifron's film, Bottom of the Sea, receiving a nomination for Best Actor from the Argentine Film Critics Association.

Prominent roles followed in The Paranoids (2008), Phase 7 and the box office smash, Mi primera boda (2011). In 2012, he starred in the telenovela, Graduados, which became a phenomenon in Argentina. He reunited with Burman for Argentina's first original Netflix series, Edha (2014).

He later starred in The Lost Brother (2017) and The Intruder (2020). He starred in two seasons of the acclaimed Netflix comedy series, División Palermo (2023-2025) by Santiago Korovsky.

He made his debut as screenwriter and director with the film Norberto's Deadline in 2010. He has since written and directed A Loose End (2025) and 27 Nights (2025).

Hendler is part of the generation of actors who revitalized the Uruguayan cinema with films like 25 Watts, and is one of the regular actors of the so-called New Argentine Cinema.

== Early life ==
Hendler was born in Montevideo, Uruguay in 1976, to a Jewish family. He was raised in the Buceo, Pocitos and Cordón neighborhoods. His father was a merchant and his mother a keen theatergoer. He attended the Jewish school Escuela Integral and played basketball at Hebraica Macabi.

Atypically, he had two bar mitzvah ceremonies because his parents were separated since he was five years old. While he's Jewish, he's not religious and does not believe in God. At 14, he began doing theater with some friends.

He was assistant professor and head of drama at the Catholic University of Uruguay in Montevideo. In 1994, he started to train in acting. He, with a number of friends, created the theatre group "Acapara el 522" (Here-stops the 522), a sort of inside joke and pun where the bus line stop in his hometown. They appeared at the "Youth Contest of Theater in Montevideo", competing with over a hundred plays, and won, "Since then, we made five works, of which three were written and directed by me, another by a friend, and the other by Leo Maslíah, who is like a friend of the group," said Hendler. During his time in "Acapara el 522," he was linked with musician and writer Leo Maslíah, with whom he made a literary workshop, adapted one of his stories, and was directed in the play Abulimia. He also made some short films with Pablo Stoll and Juan Pablo Rebella.

Hendler spent almost five years in the University of Architecture of Montevideo, plus some other years of theatrical training. First, he wanted to be an actor, then musician (studied guitar for several years), then architect, but finally decided on acting. One of his first experiences as an actor was in the play Rompiendo códigos.

Among his main influences he mentions Roberto Jones, Roberto Fontana, Walter Reyno, Jorge Bolani, Pablo Stoll, and Juan Pablo Rebella.

== Career ==
In 2001, he won the award for Best Actor for the Uruguayan movie 25 Watts in the Buenos Aires International Festival of Independent Cinema, "It was a very nice prize, maybe the prettiest of all, but I don't know what it meant in my career, maybe nothing. What meant a lot was the movie, having worked in 25 Watts was important for me and my career," said Hendler. In 25 Watts, Hendler plays a youngster from a quiet neighborhood of Montevideo who wanders without a clear direction while at the same time has to study for a test of Italian and has a crush on his tutor. Filmed in 2000 with a very low budget, the film revitalized the Uruguayan film and aided by the awards received in Europe (Best Film at the International Film Festival Rotterdam) marked the beginning of a new stage in the film scene of that country. Almost ten years after its release, Hendler said in an interview, "It was a novelty to see a Uruguayan movie that didn't submit the mate, the Palacio Salvo, and the promenade as a justification for being, was a story of some neighborhood guys."

Although he had already starred in several short and feature films, he became known in Argentina for the ads of Telefónica, a telecommunications company, in 2002, playing Walter, a character by which would be recognized for several years later. Subsequently, Hendler won the Silver Bear for Best Actor in the Berlin International Film Festival for his work in Lost Embrace and Best Actor in the Lleida Latin-American Film Festival for Bottom of the Sea. In Bottom of the Sea (2003), Hendler plays a paranoid architecture student who pursues his girlfriend's psychoanalyst suspecting she's being unfaithful.

"There's a part that I like, no doubt, because if not, I wouldn't be involved in acting. What happens is that the popularity that comes to you is not always what you expect: you wanna be greeted when you feel like it. But I never suffered that, because I've never exceed the line of massive popularity. It is difficult to learn that the more love, the more shade. That is, there is no ideal popularity, we must assume it, in the same way that many people will love you, many people will reject you."

— Hendler on popularity

Hendler is regular in the Daniel Burman's works. In addition to his brief role in Every Stewardess Goes to Heaven (playing a taxi driver), he has worked in Waiting for the Messiah (2000), Lost Embrace (2004), and Family Law (2005). In those three films his characters are named "Ariel", considered Burman's alter ego; this is most noticeable in Lost Embrace, where Hendler plays a young Jew who research his Polish ancestry to get a passport and emigrate to Europe, as did the director in real life. On the question, Hendler said, "I don't feel I'm Burman's alter ego."

Burman and Hendler met each other in 1998 when the first was visiting Uruguayan theatres with director Marco Bechis looking for an actor for Garage Olimpo. They went to see actor Walter Reyno, and in the same play, entitled The amateur, was Hendler. After Hendler performance, they did a casting in a bar with a digital camera, with Burman playing a Jew and Hendler a Nazi. Finally he didn't get the role for Garage Olimpo, but months later Burman called him to make Waiting for the Messiah.

In 2007, The Paranoids was released with Hendler playing Luciano, a hermit and repressed children's parties entertainer who is based on film's director Gabriel Medina, who met Hendler during the filming of Bottom of the Sea. The New York Times' critic Stephen Holden wrote, "Yet for all his infuriatingly neurotic self-sabotage, Mr. Hendler makes Luciano such a lovable loser that you root for him to get over himself." while Boxoffice wrote, "Hendler captures the heart of Luciano's anxieties: his fear of success."

Following The Paranoids, Hendler made his first incursion on television appearing on an episode of the series Mujeres Asesinas ("Killer Women"), and in 2008 was seen on the comedy series Aquí no hay quien viva, playing a lazy janitor named Roman. "I wanted to bring myself to do television and, as time passed, not having traveled that path was increasingly weighing on me," said Hendler in an interview for Clarín.

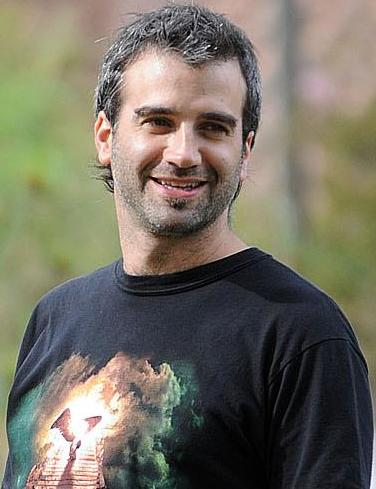
Hendler filming Graduados in 2012.

His first work as writer and director was Norberto's Deadline (2010), about a shy and unemployed salesman named Norberto who start to study acting to gain confidence on himself. As screenwriter, he had previously collaborated on the script for Daniel Burman's El nido vacío (2008). The film was filmed in Uruguay and produced by both countries from the Río de la Plata, "The crew that I chose is my 'dream team'; it's the people I dreamed to work with, beyond nationality, and ended up being a very mixed team, a mixture from Uruguay and Argentina," said Hendler. He had never studied filmmaking before, he says, "Many times we begin with the assumption that the problem of film is on the technical knowledge, but the technical rules are the quickest to learn and the least you use. Experience in the use of certain resources is what gives you the possible solutions or shortcuts at the time of transporting to the screen what you imagined. The more knowledge you have, the easier you reach it, but 'the truths' about cinematic technique are the easiest to solve as a director. There were things I already knew how to do, and some others I didn't, and depend on what you're looking in each movie." By 2003, Hendler had started writing an ensemble story called "The Day Ends at 10," he dismissed the story but the characters were kept for another ensemble film, "The Move", which included a character named Norberto, a role that started to have more and more prominence, until the story finally became Norberto's Deadline.

Daniel Hendler played the character Andrés Goddzer in the 2012 telenovela Graduados, which proved a big success. He received a Tato Award and a Martín Fierro award for his work.

In addition to his work in film and TV, Hendler is also a stage actor, "That's where I think I feel more comfortable, where I feel that you're a real actor. On television and in film, you play to be an actor, but in theatre you're there, with all your implements," he said.

== Personal life ==
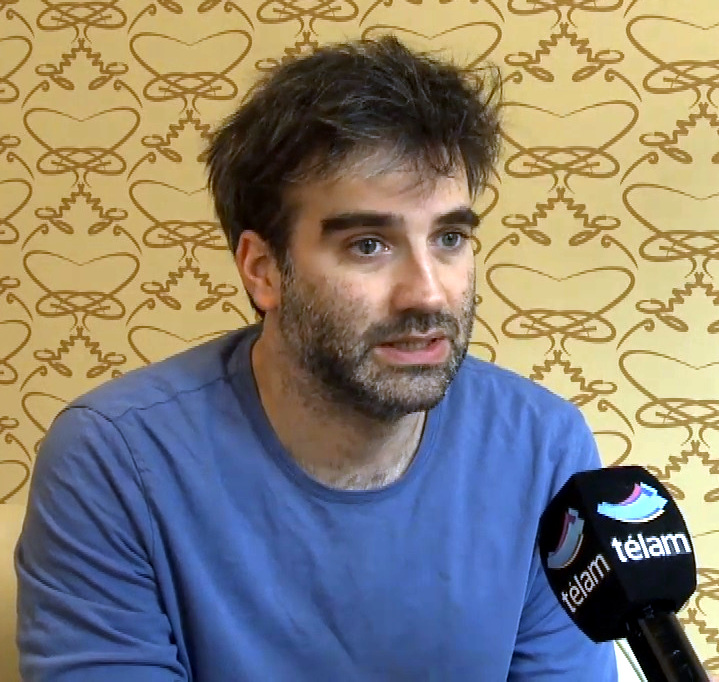
Hendler in 2014.

Hendler married Argentine film director Ana Katz in 2007, they have since separated. The couple have two children together. He moved from Montevideo to Buenos Aires, and divides his time between Parque Centenario and Montevideo. He has not taken Argentine citizenship.

== Filmography ==
=== Films ===
Year	Title	Role	Notes
2000	Waiting for the Messiah	Ariel Goldstein	
2001	25 Watts	Leche	
2001	Todas las azafatas van al cielo	Taxista	
2001	Sábado	Martín	
2001	El ojo en la nuca	Diego	Short film.
2002	No sabe no contesta	David	
2003	Bottom of the Sea	Ezequiel Toledo	
2004	Lost Embrace	Ariel Makaroff	
2004	Whisky	Martín, the younger husband	
2005	Los suicidas	Daniel	
2005	Queens	Óscar	
2006	La Perrera	Estudiante en hogar	
2006	Una novia errante	Miguel	
2006	Cara de queso —mi primer ghetto—	Vercovich	
2006	Family Law	Ariel Perelman	
2008	La ronda	Pedro	
2008	The Paranoids	Luciano Gauna	
2009	Cabeça a prêmio	Dênis	
2011	Phase 7	Coco	
2011	Los Marziano	Francisco Peirú	
2011	Mi primera boda	Adrián	
2012	Between Valleys	Carlos	
2013	Vino para robar	Sebastián	
2014	Edifício Tatuapé Mahal	Javier Juarez Garcia (voice)	Short film
2015	My Friend from the Park	Gustavo	
2015	Hijos nuestros		
2017	El otro hermano	Javier Cetari	
2017	Severina	Amigo 1	
2019	The Moneychanger	Humberto Brause	
2019	The Sleepwalkers	Sergio	
2020	The Intruder	Leopoldo	
2022	Virus-32	Luis	
2022	El sistema K.E.OP/S	Fernando	
2022	Pequeña flor	José	
2022	Lunáticos	Víctor	
2024	The Silence of Marcos Tremmer	Dr. Alejandro Tremmer	
2025	Astronaut	Nicolás	
2025	27 Nights	Leandro Casares	
2025	Crazy Old Lady	Pedro	
2025	Quase Deserto	Benjamín	

=== Television ===
- Mujeres en Rojo: Despedida (2003)
- Sin código (2004) (uncredited)
- Epitafios (2004) (miniseries)
- Aquí no hay quien viva (2008)
- Mujeres Asesinas (2008)
- Para vestir santos (2010)
- Cuando me sonreís (2011)
- Los únicos (2011)
- Televisión x la inclusión (2011)
- Graduados (2012)
- 100 días para enamorarse (2018)
- Pequeña Victoria (2019-2020)
- División Palermo (2023-2024)
- Los mufas, suerte para la desgracia (2025-present)

=== Director ===
- Norberto's Deadline (2010) (written by)
- A Loose End (2025)
- 27 Nights (2025)

== Awards and nominations ==
Year	Award / Festival	Category	Work	Result
1996	Cutcsa Prize – 13th Young Theatre Showcase	Special distinction for text and visual proposal	Crímenes y Resfríos	Won
2000	Premios Morosoli	Silver Morosoli (theatre work)	—	Won
2000	Clarín Awards	Breakthrough Actor	Waiting for the Messiah	Won
2001	Buenos Aires International Independent Film Festival (BAFICI)	Best Actor	25 Watts	Won
2001	Asociación de Críticos de Cine del Uruguay (ACCU)	Best Actor	25 Watts	Won
2001	Argentine Film Critics Association	Breakthrough Actor	Waiting for the Messiah	Nominated
2002	Clermont-Ferrand International Short Film Festival	Innovation Award	Perro perdido	Won
2002	Huesca International Film Festival	Best New Director	Perro perdido	Won
2004	Lleida Latin-American Film Festival	Best Actor	Bottom of the Sea	Won
2004	Berlin International Film Festival	Silver Bear for Best Actor	Lost Embrace	Won
2004	Toulouse Latin American Film Festival	Tribute Award	—	Won
2004	Argentine Film Critics Association	Silver Condor Award for Best Actor	Bottom of the Sea	Nominated
2004	Clarín Awards	Best Actor	Lost Embrace	Nominated
2005	Argentine Film Critics Association	Silver Condor Award for Best Actor	Lost Embrace	Nominated
2006	Argentine Academy of Cinematography Arts and Sciences Awards	Best Actor	Family Law	Nominated
2007	Argentine Film Critics Association	Silver Condor Award for Best Actor	Family Law	Nominated
2008	Biarritz International Festival of Latin American Cinema	Best Actor	The Paranoids	Won
2009	Lima Film Festival	Best Actor	The Paranoids	Won
2009	San Sebastián International Film Festival	TVE Award	Norberto’s Deadline	Won
2010	Premios Morosoli	Silver Morosoli – Moving Image	—	Won
2010	Locarno International Film Festival	Golden Leopard – Filmmakers of the Present	Norberto’s Deadline	Nominated
2011	Mexico City International Film Festival	Best Screenplay	Norberto’s Deadline	Won
2011	BAFICI	SIGNIS Award	Norberto’s Deadline	Won
2011	BAFICI	Best Film	Norberto’s Deadline	Nominated
2011	Lume International Film Festival	Best Film	Norberto’s Deadline	Nominated
2012	Tato Awards	Best Actor in Fiction	Graduados	Won
2012	Argentine Film Critics Association	Best Ibero-American Film	Norberto’s Deadline	Nominated
2013	Martín Fierro Awards	Best Actor in a Telenovela	Graduados	Won
2016	ACCU Awards	Best Director	El candidato	Nominated
2016	ACCU Awards	Best Screenplay	El candidato	Nominated
2016	ACCU Awards	Career Achievement Award	—	Won
2017	BAFICI	Best Film	El candidato	Nominated
2017	Miami International Film Festival	Best Director	El candidato	Won
2017	Havana Film Festival New York	Best Screenplay	El candidato	Won
2018	Argentine Film Critics Association	Best Ibero-American Film	El candidato	Nominated
2021	Argentine Film Critics Association	Best Supporting Actor	The Intruder	Nominated
2025	Argentine Film Critics Association	Silver Condor Award for Best Film	A Loose End	Nominated
2025	Martín Fierro Awards	Best Actor in a television series	Los mufas, suerte para la desgracia	Nominated
2026	Argentine Film Critics Association	Silver Condor Award for Best Actor	27 Nights	Nominated
2026	Argentine Film Critics Association	Silver Condor Award for Best Adapted Screenplay	27 Nights	Nominated
