= Carlos Busqued =

Argentine writer (1970–2021)

Carlos Busqued (1970 – March 29, 2021) was an Argentine writer, radio producer, engineer and university professor in the Department of Engineering at the University of Córdoba.

== Early life ==
Carlos Sebastián Busqued was born in the city of Presidencia Roque Sáenz Peña, province of Chaco, Argentina, in 1970. He lived there until the age of fifteen, when he moved to the city of Córdoba and finished his high school education. In Córdoba, he studied mechanical engineering, graduated and tried to study Literature, but dropped out just a few months after starting it. Between 2006 and 2007, he settled in the city of Buenos Aires.

=== Work in radio, literature and teaching ===
Busqued taught at the Universidad Tecnológica Nacional de Buenos Aires, in addition to traveling twice a month to the city of Córdoba to give classes there. He was also a member of the Executive Committee of EDUTECNE, the publishing house of the UTN. As a radio producer, he produced the radio programs El otoño en Pekín, Vidas Ejemplares and Prisionero del Planeta Infierno, besides having collaborated in the magazine El Ojo con Dientes and in the last issue of the magazine Cerdos y Peces.

As a writer, Busqued published in 2009 his first book, the novel Bajo este sol tremendo, in the Spanish publishing house Anagrama. It was a semi-finalist for the Herralde Prize in 2008, translated into English, Italian, French and German; and later made into a film by Israel Adrián Caetano in 2017, under the title El otro hermano. Nine years later, in 2018, the writer published his second and last book, the non-fiction novel Magnetizado. At the beginning of 2019, Busqued faced a court case for sexual abuse after being denounced by a woman at the Domestic Violence Office of the city of Buenos Aires. Following this, a perimetral restraining order was imposed on the writer, to which he responded with a prohibition of mutual contact towards the complainant after she had contacted him, in May 2019. Finally, after the complainant was given the possibility of advancing a criminal action and Busqued had denounced that the facts did not occur, the case was filed.

=== Death ===
Busqued died at his home in the neighborhood of San Cristóbal, Buenos Aires, on March 29, 2021, at the age of fifty, due to a heart attack. After his death, several writers, Internet users and public figures expressed their grief through social networks.

=== Works ===
Bajo este sol tremendo (2008) Magnetizado: una conversación con Ricardo Melogno/ Magnetized: Conversations with a Serial Killer (2018 Sp, 2020 Eng.) Borderline Carlito (2024)
