= Daniel Burman =

Argentine film director and producer (born 1973)

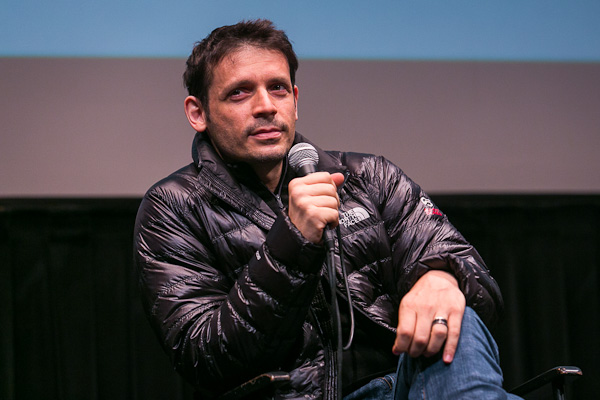
- Burman at Lincoln Center's Walter Reade Theater, January 2013.
- Born: Daniel Burman; August 29, 1973 (age 52); Buenos Aires, Argentina
- Occupations: Film director, screenwriter and film producer
- Years active: 1995–present
- Children: Eloy Burman

Daniel Burman (born 29 August 1973, in Buenos Aires) is an Argentine film director, screenplay writer, and producer.

According to film critic Joel Poblete, who writes for Mabuse, a cinema magazine, Daniel Burman is one of the members of the so-called "New Argentina Cinema", which began circa 1998. In fact, film critic Anthony Kaufman, writing for indieWIRE, said Burman's A Chrysanthemum Burst in Cincoesquinas (1998) has been cited as the beginning of the "New Argentine Cinema" wave.

== Biography ==
Burman is of Polish-Jewish descent, and he was born and raised in Buenos Aires. He holds both Argentine and Polish citizenship, like his films' character, Ariel. He studied law before changing to audiovisual media production.

In 1995, he launched his own production company together with Diego Dubcovsky, BD Cine (Burman and Dubcovsky Cine). Burman is also a founding member of the Academy of Argentine Cinema.

His loose trilogy of films, Esperando al Mesías (2000), El Abrazo Partido (2004), and Derecho de Familia (2006), were all written and directed by Burman and star Uruguayan actor Daniel Hendler. They are largely autobiographical, dealing with the life of a young neurotic Jew in contemporary Buenos Aires.

He frequently collaborates with other Argentine Jews, notably writer and klezmer musician Marcelo Birmajer, and César Lerner. His comedic touches often bring comparison to Woody Allen, a comparison Burman is quick to reject. He said, "It's not a measurable comparison. But I'm very happy with it. I admire him more than anyone else in the world."

Burman's films have been featured in many film festivals around the world. El abrazo partido (2003) took the Grand Jury Prize at the Berlin International Film Festival, as well as best actor for Hendler. Burman was co-producer of the successful 2004 film, The Motorcycle Diaries, as well as Garage Olimpo (1999).

== Opinions on filmmaking ==
In an interview with Brian Brooks, who writes for indieWIRE.com, an online community of independent filmmakers and aficionados, Burman discussed his approach to filmmaking. He said: "I don't have goals when I make a film, except to create the story I wanted to tell as faithfully as possible, and that the sensations that provoked me to tell the story are also caused when reading the script."

"I don't love film in itself; it's not like I was debating the merits of using different types of camera-work, like traveling shots. I love film because it's a story-telling tool," he said in an interview he did for TimesSquare.com.

== Interconnections between films ==
It is arguable that the loose trilogy of films — Esperando al Mesías (2000), El Abrazo Partido (2003), and Derecho de Familia (2006) — happen in the same "universe". The three share common traits: They are written and directed by Burman and all star Daniel Hendler in the title role as a young Jew. Additionally, several actors and actresses appear twice in the films. Because Hendler's characters share similar traits (they are all named Ariel: Ariel Goldstein, Ariel Makaroff and Ariel Perelman respectively) and because some characters from one film seem to appear in another, the trilogy is usually considered as happening in the same universe

Several continuity changes show that the three Ariels are different people: In the first movie, Ariel's father is a restaurant owner, and his mother dies; in the second film, his father has been long gone, and his mother tends to a small shop; in the third movie, his father dies in the film, and his mother has been long dead. However, a character named Estela from the first film appears in the second, and is both times played by Melina Petriella. This at least connects the first two movies to the same universe. Additionally, Juan José Flores Quispe appears in the second and third movie as "Ramón". Although his character, unlike Estela, varies from film to film, this suggests that the second and third film also share the same universe and, thus, the trilogy itself is set in the same storyline, with the "Ariel persona" showing either different aspects of the same character or simply being a mere coincidence.

== Filmography ==
=== Producer ===
- El Crimen del Cacaro Gumaro (2014) a.k.a. "The Popcorn Chronicles"
- The Man Who Bought the Moon (2018)

=== Director ===
- ¿En qué estación estamos? (1992, short)
- Post data de ambas cartas (1993, short)
- Help o el pedido de auxilio de una mujer viva (1994, short)
- Niños envueltos (1995, short)
- Un Crisantemo Estalla en Cinco Esquinas (1998) a.k.a. A Chrysanthemum Burst in Cincoesquinas
- Esperando al Mesías (2000) a.k.a. Waiting for the Messiah
- Todas Las Azafatas Van Al Cielo (2002) a.k.a. Every Stewardess Goes to Heaven
- El Abrazo Partido (2004) a.k.a. Lost Embrace
- 18-J (2004)
- Derecho de Familia (2006) a.k.a. Family Law
- Encarnación (2007)
- El nido vacío (2008)
- Brother and Sister (2010)
- La suerte en tus manos (2012)
- Mystery of Happiness (2014)
- The Tenth Man (2016)
- Transmitzvah (2024)

==== Television ====
- La pista (1997)
- Un cuento de Navidad (2002)
- Yosi, the Regretful Spy (2022)

== Awards ==
- Bangkok World Film Festival: Best Film; El Abrazo partido; 2004.
- Berlin International Film Festival: Silver Berlin Bear; Jury Grand Prix; for El Abrazo partido; 2004.
- Clarin Entertainment Awards: Clarin Award Best Film Screenplay; for Derecho de familia; 2006.
- Clarin Entertainment Awards: Won Clarin Award Best Film Screenplay; for El Abrazo partido; 2004.
- Festróia - Tróia International Film Festival: Golden Dolphin; for Todas las azafatas van al cielo; 2002.
- Havana Film Festival: Best Unpublished Screenplay; for El abrazo partido; 2002.
- Havana Film Festival: Won Grand Coral, Third Prize; for Esperando al mesías; 2000.
- Lleida Latin-American Film Festival: Best Director; Best Film; ICCI Screenplay Award; all for El Abrazo partido; 2004.
- Lleida Latin-American Film Festival: Best Film; for El Esperando al mesías 2001.
- Mar del Plata Film Festival: Audience Award; Best Ibero-American Film; SIGNIS Award; all for Derecho de familia; 2006.
- Santa Fe Film Festival: Luminaria Award; Best Latino Film; for Todas las azafatas van al cielo; 2002.
- Sochi International Film Festival: FIPRESCI Prize; for Un Crisantemo estalla en cinco esquinas; 1998.
- Sundance Film Festival: NHK Award; for Every Stewardess Goes to Heaven (Latin America); 2001.
- Valladolid International Film Festival: FIPRESCI Prize; for Esperando al mesías; For an honest, both realistic and symbolic depiction of human hopes in Buenos Aires nowadays; 2002.
