= Waiting for the Messiah =

2000 Argentine/Spanish/Italian comedy drama film

- Theatrical release poster
- Spanish: Esperando al mesías
- Directed by: Daniel Burman
- Written by: Daniel Burman; Emiliano Torres
- Produced by: Luis Ángel Bellaba; Enrique Piñeyro
- Starring: Héctor Alterio; Daniel Hendler; Imanol Arias; Stefania Sandrelli; Chiara Caselli; Enrique Piñeyro; Melina Petriella; Gabriela Acher
- Cinematography: Ramiro Civita
- Edited by: Verónica Chen
- Music by: César Lerner; Marcelo Moguilevsky
- Production companies: Astrolabio Producciones; Classic Films; BD Cine
- Distributed by: Primer Plano Film Group (Argentina); Amanda Films (Spain)
- Release dates: May 25, 2000 (Argentina); January 26, 2001 (Spain)
- Running time: 97 minutes
- Countries: Spain; Italy; Argentina
- Languages: Spanish; Yiddish

Waiting for the Messiah (Spanish: Esperando al mesías) is a 2000 Argentine comedy drama film directed by Daniel Burman. The film stars Daniel Hendler as the protagonist, Ariel Goldstein, marking Hendler's feature film debut. He is joined in the cast by Enrique Piñeyro, Héctor Alterio, Melina Petriella, Stefania Sandrelli, Imanol Arias and Dolores Fonzi, among others. Set in 1999 in Once, a Jewish neighbourhood in Buenos Aires, it focuses on a young man torn between his devotion to traditional family ties, to marry a Jewish woman and run the family business, and his desire for a different lifepath.

The film was theatrically released in Argentina on 25 May 2000 and had its North American premiere at the 2000 Toronto International Film Festival on September 14. It was a critical success among Argentine and international reviewers. Critics praised the casting and use of Jewish themes.

It is the first of a semi-autobiographical trilogy by Burman, followed by Lost Embrace (2004) Family Law (2006), and also starring Hendler.

== Plot ==
The picture tells of Ariel (Daniel Hendler), a post-production video editor, a young man who is torn between his devotion to traditional family ties and the desire for something different, and, of Santamaría (Enrique Piñeyro) an older bank employee who suddenly finds his life in complete turmoil.

Santamaria is unexpectedly fired from his bank job due to the world's stock market shocks. His wife takes this event as an opportunity to get rid of him and put him out on the street. Forced to make a small living returning stolen wallets, Santamaria finds some hope in Elsa, a bathroom attendant (Stefania Sandrelli) who is waiting for her husband to be released from prison.

Ariel is very much against the restraints of a future that will see him take over his elderly father's (Héctor Alterio) restaurant and marry an Argentine Jewish girl (Melina Petriella). At the same time, Ariel is also infatuated with a bisexual gentile co-worker, Laura (Chiara Caselli).

== Cast ==
- Daniel Hendler as Ariel Goldstein
- Enrique Piñeyro as Santamaría
- Héctor Alterio as Simón
- Melina Petriella as Estela
- Stefania Sandrelli as Elsa
- Chiara Caselli as Laura
- Gabriela Acher as Sara
- Imanol Arias as Baltasar
- Dolores Fonzi as Any
- Edda Bustamante as Mujer trampa
- Tajma Minoru as Oriental
- Juan José Flores Quispe as Ramón
- Eduardo Wigutow as Moshé Levin
- Beatriz Thibaudin as Anciana
- Sandra Sandrelli as Santa
- Dan Adaszko as Albino 1
- Ariel Adaszko as Albino 2

== Background ==
The title alludes to the Jewish belief of "waiting for the Messiah"; in this case, characters are shown at first to be inactive and dormant, until death and crisis forces them to take action and reevaluate their lives.

== Distribution ==
The film opened wide in Argentina on May 25, 2000.

It received its North American premiere at the 2020 Toronto International Film Festival on September 14, 2000. It was later screened at the Palm Springs International Film Festival on January 12, 2001.

It was released theatrically in Spain on January 26, 2001.

== Reception ==
Deborah Young praised the film in Variety: "Considered one of the best Argentine films of the season, “Messiah” handles ethnicity lightly and affectionately, making Jewishness one of many parallel universes that coexist in a tricky urban environment." Young praised the casting: "Burman keeps things moving with help from a well-chosen cast. It’s easy to identify with Hendler as the restless son, Petriella as a Jewish homebody and Caselli (who directs short films herself) as an unconventional vid filmer."

In 2021, the British Film Institute recognised the film as pivotal in heralding the New Argentine Wave.

=== Awards ===
Wins

- Valladolid International Film Festival, Spain: Critics Association Award; FIPRESCI Prize: For an honest, both realistic and symbolic depiction of human hopes in Buenos Aires today; 2000.
- Havana Film Festival: Grand Coral Third Prize; Cuba; 2000.
- Buenos Aires International Festival of Independent Cinema: Special Award to Enrique Piñeyro for his Acting Performance; Argentina; 2000.
- Biarritz Film Festival: Audience Award; France; 2000.
- Argentine Film Critics Association Awards: Silver Condor; Best Music, César Lerner and Marcelo Moguilevsky; 2001.
- Lleida Latin-American Film Festival: Best Film; Daniel Burman; 2001.

Nominations

- Bratislava International Film Festival: Grand Prix, Daniel Burman; 2000.
- Thessaloniki Film Festival: Golden Alexander, Daniel Burman; 2000.
- Valladolid International Film Festival: Golden Spike, Daniel Burman; 2000.
- Argentine Film Critics Association Awards: Silver Condor, Best Director, Daniel Burman; Best Film; Best New Actor, Daniel Hendler; Best New Actress, Melina Petriella; Best Original Screenplay, Daniel Burman and Emiliano Torres; Best Supporting Actress, Stefania Sandrelli; 2001.

== See also ==
- List of Argentine films of 2000
- List of Spanish films of 2001
