= A Través de Tus Ojos =

Studio album by Los Bukis
- Released: October 18, 1991
- Recorded: July – October 1991
- Genre: Grupero
- Length: 39:16
- Label: Fonovisa
- Producer: Marco Antonio Solís

Los Bukis chronology
Y Para Siempre (1989)	A Través de Tus Ojos (1991)	Quiéreme (1992)

Singles from A Través de Tus Ojos
- 1. "Mi Deseo"; 2. "Dos"; 3. "Chiquilla Bonita"

Professional ratings
Review scores
Source	Rating
Allmusic	3/5 stars

A Través de Tus Ojos (Eng.: "Through Your Eyes") is the thirteenth studio album released by Los Bukis on October 18, 1991. It received a Grammy Award nomination for Best Latin Pop Album.

Currently, this album is unavailable on streaming services in the United States.

== Track listing ==
All songs written and composed by Marco Antonio Solís

No.	Title	Length
1.	"Después de un Adiós"	4:17
2.	"Alla Tú"	3:07
3.	"Dime Que No Te Perdi"	4:02
4.	"Chiquilla Bonita"	4:48
5.	"Que Puedo Hacer Por Ti"	4:33
6.	"Dos"	3:08
7.	"A Través de Tus Ojos"	3:14
8.	"Mi Deseo"	4:04
9.	"No Te des Por Vencido"	3:32
10.	"Mi Ironía"	4:17

== Personnel ==
- Marco Antonio Solís – vocals, rhythm guitar
- Joel Solis – lead guitar
- Roberto Guadarrama – keyboards
- Eusebio "El Chivo" Cortez – bass
- Jose "Pepe" Guadarrama – percussion and additional keyboards
- Pedro Sanchez – drums

== Charts ==
Chart (1991)	Peak position
US Latin Pop Albums (Billboard)	4
