= Lleida Latin-American Film Festival =

Cinema festival in Catalonia, Spain

Coordinates: 41°51′N 1°34′E

The Lleida Latin-American Film Festival (Catalan: Mostra de Cinema Llatinoamericà de Lleida, or shortened to Catalan: Mostra de Lleida) is a cinema festival that takes place in Lleida, Catalonia, Spain awarding Latin American films. It is organised by the Latin American Centre of Lleida and is sponsored by the city council (La Paeria), the University of Lleida and La Caixa. It's one of the main yearly cultural events in the town and takes place at the Teatre Principal, CaixaFòrum Lleida, Funatic, Cafè del Teatre de l'Escorxador, Institut d'Estudis Ilerdencs, the main campus of the University of Lleida, and the Hotel Condes de Urgel, alongside other cultural activities. The event has taken place since 1993, and awards were first given in 1997. At one time the festival took place in January but it now takes place in late March.

== Awards ==
- Best Film (Wimp Dorean)
- Best Direction (Mejor Dirección)
- Best Screenplay (Mejor Guión)
- Best Actor (Mejor Actor)
- Best Actress (Mejor Actriz)
- Best First Work (Mejor Ópera Prima)

== Best Films ==
- 2001: Esperando al mesías (Italy-Spain-Argentina)
- 2002: En la puta vida (Uruguay-Argentina-Cuba-Spain-Belgium)
- 2003: El bonaerense (Argentina-Chile-France-Netherlands)
- 2004: El abrazo partido (Argentina-France-Italy-Spain)
- 2005: Buenos Aires 100 kilómetros (Argentina-France)
- 2006: Al otro lado (Mexico)
- 2007: A través de tus ojos (Argentina)
- 2008: No mires para abajo (Argentina)
- 2009: Desierto adentro (Mexico)
- ...
- 2019: Beyond the Mountains

== Audience Awards ==
- 1997: Caballos salvajes (1995)
- 1998: Cenizas del paraíso (1997)
- 1999: Amaneció de golpe (1998)
- 2000: Sé quién eres (2000)
- 2001: Nueve reinas (2000)
- 2002: En la puta vida (2001)
- 2003: Donde cae el sol (2002) and Nada (2001)
- 2004: El Chino (2003)
- 2006: Al otro lado (2005)
- 2007: Your Dick! (2006)
