= Diego Dubcovsky =

Argentine film producer

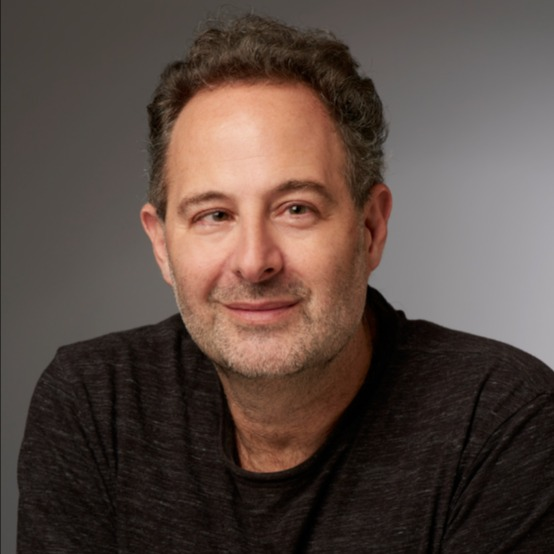
Diego Dubcovsky

Diego Dubcovsky (born 1967 in Buenos Aires) is an Argentine film producer.
