= List of Spanish films of 1992 =

A list of Spanish-produced and co-produced feature films released in Spain in 1992. The domestic theatrical release date is favoured.

== Films ==
Release		Title (Native title)	Cast & Crew	Ref.
J A N U A R Y	3	Belle Époque	Director: Fernando Trueba Cast: Penélope Cruz, Miriam Díaz-Aroca, Gabino Diego, Fernando Fernán Gómez, Michel Galabru, Ariadna Gil, Agustín González, Chus Lampreave, Mary Carmen Ramírez, Maribel Verdú	
J A N U A R Y	24	Pink Sauce (Salsa rosa)	Director: Manuel Gómez Pereira Cast: Verónica Forqué, Maribel Verdú, Juanjo Puigcorbé, José Coronado	
F E B R U A R Y	26	Vacas	Director: Julio Medem Cast: Emma Suárez, Carmelo Gómez, Ana Torrent, Manuel Blasco, Klara Badiola, Cándido Uranga	
F E B R U A R Y	28	A Woman in the Rain (Una mujer bajo la lluvia)	Director: Gerardo Vera Cast: Ángela Molina, Antonio Banderas, Imanol Arias	
M A R C H	20	The Long Winter (El largo invierno)		
M A Y	8	Makinavaja, el último choriso	Director: Carlos Suárez Cast: Andrés Pajares, Jesús Bonilla, Mario Pardo	
S E P T E M B E R	4	Jamón jamón	Director: Bigas Luna Cast: Penélope Cruz, Javier Bardem, Jordi Mollà, Stefania Sandrelli, Anna Galiena, Juan Diego	
S E P T E M B E R	5	Dream of Light (El sol del membrillo)		
S E P T E M B E R	11	Club Virginia Orchestra (Orquesta Club Virginia)	Director: Manuel Iborra Cast: Jorge Sanz, Antonio Resines, Santiago Ramos, Enrique San Francisco, Emma Suárez, Juan Echanove	
S E P T E M B E R	18	The Fencing Master (El maestro de Esgrima)	Director: Pedro Olea Cast: Alberto Closas, Assumpta Serna, Joaquim de Almeida, José Luis López Vázquez, Miguel Rellán, Omero Antonutti	
S E P T E M B E R	18	Too Much Heart (Demasiado corazón)	Director: Eduardo Campoy Cast: Victoria Abril, Manuel Bandera, Pastora Vega, Mónica Molina	
O C T O B E R	8	1492: Conquest of Paradise (1492: la conquista del paraíso)	Director: Ridley Scott Cast: Gérard Depardieu, Sigourney Weaver, Fernando Rey, Armand Assante, Loren Dean	
O C T O B E R	9	Después del sueño	Director: Mario Camus Cast: Carmelo Gómez, Antonio Valero, Lluís Homar, Eulàlia Ramon, Judit Mascó, Carlos Hipólito, Ana Belén, Fernando Rey, Fiorella Faltoyano	
O C T O B E R	16	The Anonymous Queen (La reina anónima)	Director: Gonzalo Suárez Cast: Carmen Maura, Marisa Paredes, Juanjo Puigcorbé, Jesús Bonilla, Cristina Marcos, Pepa López, Kiti Mánver	
O C T O B E R	30	A Place in the Word (Un lugar en el mundo)	Director: Adolfo Aristarain Cast: Cecilia Roth, Federico Luppi, Gastón Batyi, José Sacristán, Leonor Benedetto, Rodolfo Ranni	
N O V E M B E R	6	The Sow (La marrana)	Director: José Luis Cuerda Cast: Alfredo Landa, Antonio Resines, Manuel Alexandre, Fernando Rey, Cayetana Guillén Cuervo El Gran Wyoming, Agustín González	
D E C E M B E R	11	El beso del sueño	Director: Rafael Moreno Alba Cast: Maribel Verdú, Juan Diego, Eusebio Poncela, Tony Isbert, Valentín Paredes, Agustín González, Manuel Alexandre	

== See also ==
- 7th Goya Awards
