= List of Uruguayan submissions for the Academy Award for Best International Feature Film =

Best International Feature Film submissions from Uruguay

Highlights
- Debut: 1992
- Submissions: 26
- Nominations: 1
- Oscar winners: none

Uruguay has submitted films for the Academy Award for Best International Feature Film (Note: The category was previously named the Academy Award for Best Foreign Language Film, but this was changed to the Academy Award for Best International Feature Film in April 2019, after the Academy deemed the word "Foreign" to be outdated.) since 1992. The award is handed out annually by the United States Academy of Motion Picture Arts and Sciences to a feature-length motion picture produced outside the United States that contains primarily non-English dialogue. Cinemateca Uruguaya has been submitting the country's films.

As of 2026, Uruguay was nominated only once, for A Place in the World (1992), but the film was disqualified following the minimal Uruguayan creative input in the production.

== Submissions ==
The Academy of Motion Picture Arts and Sciences has invited the film industries of various countries to submit their best film for the Academy Award for Best International Feature Film since 1956. The International Film Feature Committee oversees the process and reviews all the submitted films. Following this, they vote via secret ballot to determine the five nominees for the award.

At the 65th Academy Awards, A Place in the World (1992) directed by Adolfo Aristarain was nominated representing Uruguay, marking the country's first submission. But soon after a controversy quickly began when stories began circulating that the film had minimal Uruguayan artistic input, being actually shot by an Argentine filmmaker in Argentina, with the plot set in Argentina, and the cast and crew primarily from Argentina. The film was also in the running (and finished in second place) to represent Argentina, and represented the country at the Golden Globe Awards and eventually went on to win Best Picture at the Argentinian National Film Awards (the Asociación de Críticos Cinematográficos de Argentina) Ultimately, AMPAS disqualified the film and removed it from the Oscar final ballot.

Uruguay took a hiatus of almost ten years, and rejoined the submission process only in 2001, and it's submitting films regularly ever since.

Alma Mater (2005), was announced but was not on the official AMPAS list, and did not screen for the Academy. The same scenario happened nearly twenty years later with The Door Is There (2024), which was also not on the official final list of the Academy.

All films were produced primary in Spanish. Below is a list of the films that have been submitted by Uruguay for review by the Academy for the award by year and the respective Academy Awards ceremony.

Year (Ceremony)	Film title used in nomination	Original title	Director(s)	Result
1992 (65th)	A Place in the World	Un lugar en el mundo	Adolfo Aristarain	Nominated But Disqualified
2001 (74th)	In This Tricky Life	En la puta vida	Beatriz Flores Silva	Not nominated
2002 (75th)	The Last Train	El Último tren	Diego Arsuaga	Not nominated
2003 (76th)	Seawards Journey	El Viaje hacia el mar	Guillermo Casanova	Not nominated
2004 (77th)	Whisky		Juan Pablo Rebella and Pablo Stoll	Not nominated
2005 (78th)	Alma Mater		Álvaro Buela	Not On Official List
2007 (80th)	The Pope's Toilet	El Baño del Papa	Cesar Charlone and Enrique Fernandez	Not nominated
2008 (81st)	Kill Them All	Matar a Todos	Esteban Schroeder	Not nominated
2009 (82nd)	Bad Day to Go Fishing	Mal día para pescar	Álvaro Brechner	Not nominated
2010 (83rd)	A Useful Life	La vida útil	Federico Veiroj	Not nominated
2011 (84th)	The Silent House	La casa muda	Gustavo Hernández Ibañez	Not nominated
2012 (85th)	The Delay	La demora	Rodrigo Plá	Not nominated
2013 (86th)	Anina		Alfredo Soderguit	Not nominated
2014 (87th)	Mr. Kaplan		Álvaro Brechner	Not nominated
2015 (88th)	A Moonless Night	Una noche sin luna	Germán Tejeira	Not nominated
2016 (89th)	Breadcrumbs	Migas de pan	Manane Rodriguez	Not nominated
2017 (90th)	Another Story of the World	Otra historia del mundo	Guillermo Casanova	Not nominated
2018 (91st)	A Twelve-Year Night	La noche de 12 años	Álvaro Brechner	Not nominated
2019 (92nd)	The Moneychanger	Así habló el cambista	Federico Veiroj	Not nominated
2020 (93rd)	Alelí		Leticia Jorge	Not nominated
2021 (94th)	The Broken Glass Theory	La teoría de los vidrios rotos	Diego Fernández	Not nominated
2022 (95th)	The Employer and the Employee	El empleado y el patrón	Manolo Nieto	Not nominated
2023 (96th)	Family Album	Temas propios	Guillermo Rocamora	Not nominated
2024 (97th)	The Door Is There	Hay una puerta ahí	Facundo Ponce de León and Juan Ponce de León	Not on the final list
2025 (98th)	Don't You Let Me Go	Agarrame fuerte	Ana Guevara and Leticia Jorge	Not nominated
2026 (99th)	A Loose End	Un cabo suelto	Daniel Hendler	Pending

== Shortlisted Films ==
Every year since 2014, except in 2019, Uruguay has announced a list of finalists that varied in number over the years (from 2 to 8 films) before announcing its official Oscar nominee. The following films have been shortlisted by the Uruguayan National Institute of Cinema and Audiovisual:

Year	Films
2014	23 Seconds · At 60 km/h · Kites on the Walls · Maracaná · The Militant · Solo · Zanahoria
2015	Tan frágil como un segundo · Your Parents Will Come Back
2016	Clever · Dolphins Go East · The Modern
2017	Get the Weed · Home Team · The Lost Brother · Night Watch
2018	Agridulce · La flor de la vida
2020	Carmen Vidal Female Detective · Porn for Newbies · Window Boy Would Also Like to Have a Submarine
2021	The Employer and the Employee · Hilda's Short Summer
2022	9 · Bosco
2023	Amores pendientes · Milonga · That Breath
2024	Don't You Let Me Go · Pepe's Dreams - Movement 2052 · The Snow Between Us · Working Lights
2025	Dogs · The Fable of the Tortoise and the Flower · Keep Coming Back · Panchopalooza · Ponsonbyland · The Silence of Marcos Tremmer

== See also ==
- List of Academy Award winners and nominees for Best International Feature Film
- List of Academy Award-winning foreign language films
