= Anina (film) =

2013 film

- Film poster
- Directed by: Alfredo Soderguit
- Written by: Federico Ivanier; Alfredo Soderguit; Germán Tejeira; Julián Goyoaga; Alejo Schettini
- Based on: Anina Yatay Salas by Sergio López Suárez
- Produced by: Julián Goyoaga; Germán Tejeira; Lina Rizo; Jhonny Hendrix
- Starring: Federica Lacaño
- Edited by: Julián Goyoaga; Germán Tejeira
- Music by: Bruno Boselli; Gastón Otero; Guillermo Pesoa
- Animation by: Alejo Schettini; Ignacio De Marco; Felipe Echeverría; Valentina Echeverría; Santiago Germano; Diego González; Richard McDaniel; Rodolfo Moncada; Marcelo Montaldo; Daniel Morales; Pablo Praino; Claudia Prezioso; Romy Cuevas; Elián Stolarsky; Denisse Torena; Yuli Velasco; Gustavo Wenzel
- Production companies: Palermo Estudio; Raindogs Cine; Antorcha Films
- Release dates: 12 February 2013 (Berlinale); 19 April 2013 (Uruguay)
- Running time: 80 minutes
- Countries: Uruguay; Colombia
- Language: Spanish

Anina is a 2013 animated comedy film written and directed by Alfredo Soderguit. It was adapted by Federico Ivanier from the children's novel by Sergio López Suárez. The film was selected as the Uruguayan entry for the Best Foreign Language Film at the 86th Academy Awards, but it was not nominated.

== Plot ==
Anina Yatay Salas is a pensive redhead who really does not like her name, with each part of it being palindrome. Her peers always ridicule her about this, especially Anina’s arch-enemy Yisel. When these two get into a playground fight one day they are sent to the school head who disciplines them with a nerve-racking punishment: they are both given a sealed black envelope which they are not allowed to open for an entire week. Haunted by nightmares, the days drag by endlessly for Anina. She and her inquisitive best friend try to devise all sorts of ways to discover what is inside the envelope. Gradually, Anina begins to realize that not only does Yisel share her fate: she also has much bigger problems to contend with than Anina. Tentatively, the two rivals begin to get to know each other. Narrated by the voice of the young protagonist, the film is able to follow Anina’s thought processes and provide an insight into her emotional world. Anina’s day-dreams are not always about her troubles and woes – they also reflect her awakening feelings of love.

== Cast ==
Character	Spanish voice actor	English voice actor
Anina Yatay Salas	Federica Lacaño	
Mother of Anina	María Mendive	
Father of Anina	César Troncoso	
The Director	Cristina Morán	
Tota	Petru Valensky	
Pocha	Roberto Suárez	

=== Other Spanish-language voice actors ===
- Federica Lacaño (Anina)
- María Mendive (Anina's mother)
- César Troncoso (Anina's father)
- Cristina Morán (director)
- Petru Valensky (Tota)
- Roberto Suárez (Pocha)
- Gimena Fajardo (teacher Águeda)
- Florencia Zabaleta (teacher Aurora)
- Guillermina Pardo (Florencia)
- Lucía Parrilla (Yisel)
- Marcel Keoroglian (César)
- Pedro Cruz Garza (Yonatan)
- Ana González Olea (Anina's grandmother)
- Claudia Prezioso (Pablo)
- Sthephany Sánchez González (TV Actress)
- Coco Legrand (Hairdresser)
- Edgar Pedraza Piña (TV Announcer)
- Julian Goyoaga (TV Announcer)
- Jhonny Hendrix Hinestroza (Perianto)
- Stefano Tononi (Italian film actress)
- Carla Moscatelli (Italian film actress)
- Denisse Torena (Chorus1)
- Claudia Prezioso (Chorus2)
- Mariale Ariceta (Chorus3)
- Alejó Schettini (Chorus4)
- Alfredo Soderguit (Chorus5)
- Germán Tejeira (Chorus6)
- Julian Goyoaga (Chorus 7)
- Niños de Giraluna (Schoolchildren)

== Awards and nominations ==
- 2014, Iris Award, won best work of the year in cinema

=== Nominations ===
- 2015, Nickelodeon Kids' Choice Awards Mexico Nomination for best film
- 2014, Platino Awards, Best Animated Film and Best Ibero-American Co-production.
- 2013, Premio Ariel Nomination for best Ibero-American film, nomination.
- 2013, Cartagena Film Festival, best film and best director, nomination.
- 2013, Buenos Aires International Festival of Independent Cinema Nomination by public vote.

== See also ==
- List of submissions to the 86th Academy Awards for Best Foreign Language Film
- List of Uruguayan submissions for the Academy Award for Best Foreign Language Film
