= Too Much Heart =

- Spanish: Demasiado corazón
- Directed by: Eduardo Campoy
- Screenplay by: Agustín Díaz Yanes
- Starring: Victoria Abril; Manuel Bandera; Pastora Vega; Mónica Molina; Manuel Gil
- Cinematography: Alfredo Mayo
- Edited by: Luis Manuel del Valle
- Music by: Mario de Benito
- Production companies: Cartel; Sogetel; Flamenco Films
- Release dates: 17 September 1992 (Madrid); 18 September 1992 (Spain)
- Country: Spain
- Language: Spanish

Too Much Heart (Spanish: Demasiado corazón) is a 1992 Spanish thriller drama film directed by Eduardo Campoy from a screenplay by Agustín Díaz Yanes which stars Victoria Abril in a dual role and Manuel Bandera alongside Pastora Vega, Mónica Molina and Manuel Gil.

== Plot ==
The plot follows two identical twins, Clara and Ana (one being very cold and calculating, contrasting to her very shy and sentimental twin), who move to the province of Cádiz and both fall romantically for a live wire man.

== Cast ==
- Victoria Abril as Clara / Ana
- Manuel Bandera
- Pastora Vega
- Mónica Molina
- Manuel Gil

== Production ==
The screenplay was penned by Agustín Díaz Yanes. The film is a Cartel, Sogetel, and Flamenco Films production. It was shot in the province of Cádiz from October to November 1991. Shooting locations included the Club Social Las Redes in El Puerto de Santa María.

== Release ==
The film received a pre-screening in Madrid on 17 September 1992, and was theatrically released on 50 theatres on 18 September 1992.

== Reception ==
Augusto Martínez Torres of El País deemed the film to be "an attractive melodrama with twins", displaying a "well-constructed" story, consistent characters, as well as good-sounding dialogue, with the director managing to provide the necessary harmony to the whole.

== Accolades ==
Year	Award	Category	Nominee(s)	Result	Ref.
1993	7th Goya Awards	Best Supporting Actress	Pastora Vega	Nominated	
1993	7th Goya Awards	Best Special Effects	Lee Wilson	Nominated	

== See also ==
- List of Spanish films of 1992
