= Federico Veiroj =

Uruguayan film director and producer (born 1976)

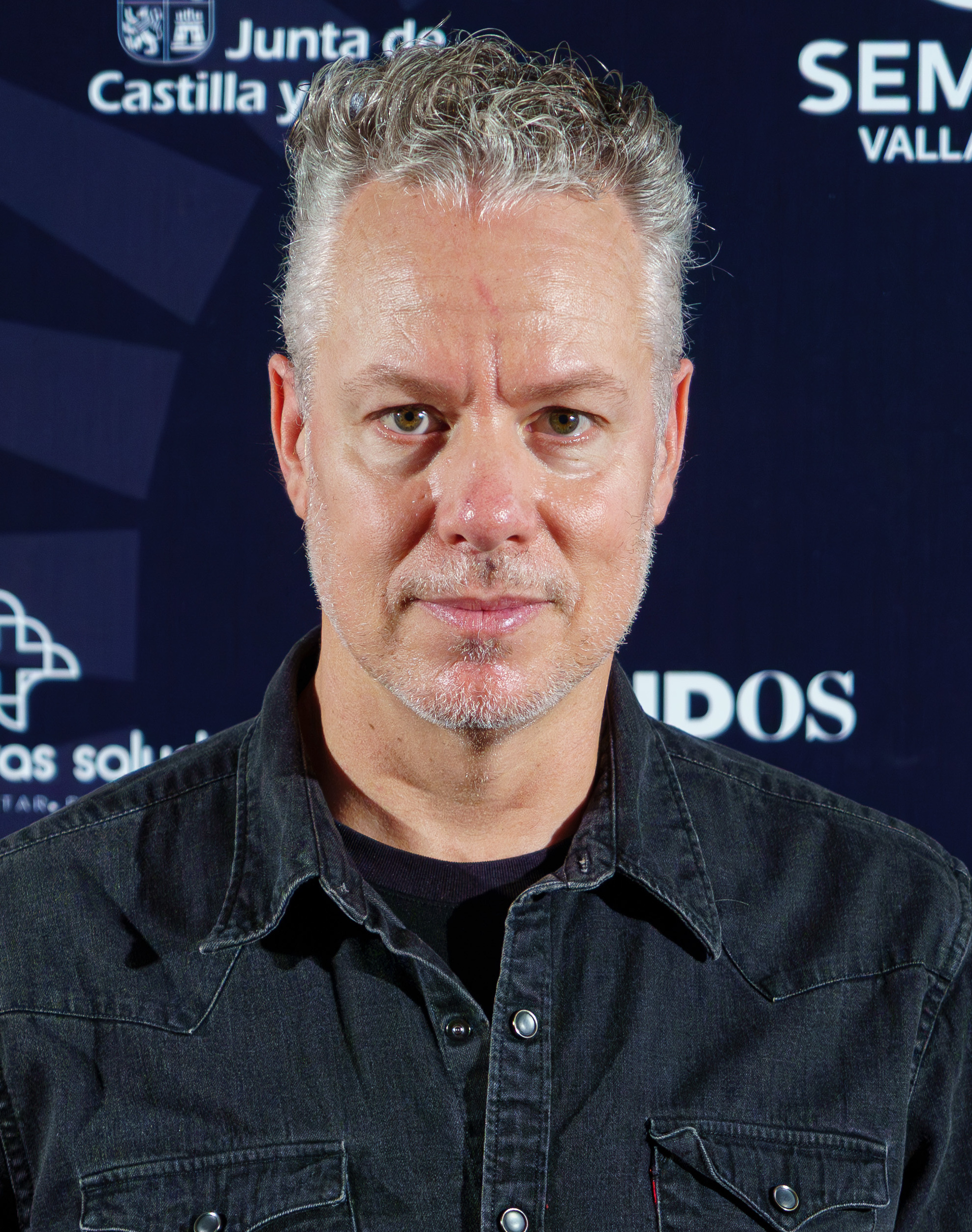
- Federico Veiroj at the 2025 Valladolid International Film Festival
- Awards: Fraternity Award

Federico Veiroj (born 1976 in Montevideo) is a Uruguayan film director, screenwriter, producer, and actor.

Veiroj studied communications at the UCUDAL. Two of his films have been submitted for the Academy Award for Best International Feature Film.

== Filmography ==
As director

- The Moneychanger (2019)
- Belmonte (2018)
- The Apostate (2015)
- A Useful Life (2010)
- Acne (2008)

As screenwriter

- Belmonte (2018)
- The Apostate (2015)
- A Useful Life (2010)
- Acne (2008)

As actor

- 25 Watts (2001) as Gerardito

== Awards ==
- 2018: Best Script – Mar del Plata International Film Festival, for Belmonte
- 2015: FIPRESCI Award – San Sebastián International Film Festival, for The Apostate
- 2010: Coral Award – Havana Film Festival, for A Useful Life
- 2010: Best Director – Valdivia International Film Festival, for A Useful Life
- 2010: Fraternity Award granted by B'nai B'rith Uruguay
