= A Place in the World (film) =

1992 film by Adolfo Aristarain

- Theatrical Poster
- Spanish: Un lugar en el mundo
- Directed by: Adolfo Aristarain
- Written by: Adolfo Aristarain; Alberto Lecchi; Kathy Saavedra
- Produced by: Adolfo Aristarain; Osvaldo Papaleo
- Starring: Federico Luppi; Cecilia Roth; José Sacristán
- Cinematography: Ricardo DeAngelis
- Edited by: Eduardo López
- Music by: Emilio Kauderer
- Distributed by: Transmundo Films
- Release dates: 9 April 1992 (Argentina); 30 October 1992 (Spain)
- Running time: 120 minutes
- Country: Argentina
- Language: Spanish

A Place in the World (Spanish: Un lugar en el mundo) is a 1992 Argentine drama film co-written, co-produced and directed by Adolfo Aristarain, and starring Federico Luppi. It stars José Sacristán, Federico Luppi, Leonor Benedetto and Cecilia Roth.

The movie won numerous awards and was also nominated for the Academy Award for Best International Feature Film; however, it was declared ineligible and removed from the final ballot because it had been submitted by Uruguay, which had exercised insufficient artistic control over the film. It is the only film so far to have been disqualified from this category after it secured a nomination.

In a survey of the 100 greatest films of Argentine cinema carried out by the Museo del Cine Pablo Ducrós Hicken in 2000, the film reached the 14th position. In a new version of the survey organized in 2022 by the specialized magazines La vida útil, Taipei and La tierra quema, presented at the Mar del Plata International Film Festival, the film reached the 34th position.

== Plot ==
The film opens with Ernesto returning to his childhood town, Santa Rosa del Conlara, in Argentina, after many years. Through his narration, we're transported back to a specific moment of his youth, initiating the story with a flashback that spans most of the movie. At the age of eleven, Ernesto adored riding horses and racing them alongside trains. He also assisted his father in teaching at a makeshift school in their home. His father, Mario, was a wool trader who had established a cooperative to improve the economic conditions of the farmers. Meanwhile, his mother, Ana, served as the town's doctor.

Ernesto encounters Hans, a Spanish geologist supposedly hired by Andrada, the town's mayor, to search for oil. However, it's later revealed that Hans is working for a multinational corporation aiming to build a hydroelectric dam. Andrada's true intention is to purchase the farmers' land cheaply before the state acquires it for the dam's construction. Hans becomes close to the family, sharing stories and forming a bond. He teaches geology at Mario's school and imparts his knowledge to Ernesto, who is fascinated by rocks.

Ernesto falls for Luciana, but her father forbids their relationship, leading to clandestine meetings. When the cooperative members, influenced by Andrada's threats, agree to sell their wool at lower prices, Mario takes drastic action by burning the wool shed to rally them to fight for better conditions. Mario informs Ernesto that he and Ana will move to Buenos Aires for his education, while he chooses to remain behind, feeling tethered to the town.

As the multinational corporation commences dam construction and Hans departs for Spain, Ana decides they will stay another year to seek a solution. The movie concludes with Ernesto standing at his father's grave, reflecting on his journey and vowing to find his place in the world.

== Cast ==
- José Sacristán as Hans
- Federico Luppi as Mario
- Leonor Benedetto as Nelda
- Cecilia Roth as Ana
- Rodolfo Ranni as Andrada
- Hugo Arana as Zamora
- Gastón Batyi as Ernesto
- Lorena del Río as Luciana
- Mario Alarcón as Juan

== Critical reception ==
Critic Mick LaSalle, film critic for the San Francisco Chronicle, liked the film and wrote, "A Place in the World is a sensitive, beautifully made coming-of-age story, set against a backdrop of Argentine politics played out on a local scale. Featuring a cast of strong characters, all driven by their deepest beliefs and passions, this is that rare case of a film that's not just lovely -- it's lively, too."

Film critic James Berardinelli wrote, "The acting is uniformly strong, with all the principal and secondary performers delivering believable portrayals. Celia (sic: Cecilia) Roth is especially worthy of mention for the emotion she projects through her eyes. She and Federico Luppi are perfectly matched. A Place in the World offers a frank, somewhat unusual view of the relationships that form families and communities. Although the film has a lot more meat to chew on than that, the issues presented by A Place in the World would not generate the same degree of interest without the characters who argue about and live them. It's hard to deny the effectiveness of this marriage between personalities and ideology where neither eclipses the other."

== Oscar controversy ==
A Place in the World, which was registered for the Golden Globes as an entry from Argentina alone, was originally submitted in the fall of 1992 to Argentina's Oscar selection committee as a possible contender. However, the committee chose (by one vote) to submit The Dark Side of the Heart instead. A Place in the World's director Adolfo Aristarain then asked Antonio Mercader, Uruguay's Minister of Education and Culture, to submit the film as a Uruguayan entry. After the minister refused, Aristarain took the matter to Manuel Martinez Carril, director of the Cinematheque of Uruguay, who agreed to sponsor the film for submission to the Academy's foreign-language film committee.

When the nominations were announced by the Academy on February 17, 1993, A Place in the World was initially included among the five nominees, and was presented as a Uruguayan submission. However, a week later, the Academy launched an investigation after it was revealed that the film was almost entirely Argentine with minimal input from Uruguayan artists. It was disqualified three days later, with the Academy saying it was essentially an Argentine production and that this violated the Academy's rules which require that there be "substantial filmmaking input from the country that submits the film". There have only been a small number of times in the Academy's history that a film was disqualified after being nominated. One previous case was that of the documentary Young Americans (1967), which had won the Academy Award for Documentary Feature but was later ruled ineligible after it was revealed that it had opened theatrically prior to the Academy's eligibility period. The disqualification of A Place in the World was all the more unusual as the Academy decided not to replace it with another film, leaving only four films in competition.

Aristarain, who argued that the film was an international co-production between Uruguay and Argentina, contested the Academy's decision, and filed suit in the United States District Court for the Central District of California on March 4. Aristarain cited the precedents set by Black and White in Color (1976), Le Bal (1983) and Dangerous Moves (1984), all of which were French productions but which were submitted, respectively, by Ivory Coast, Algeria and Switzerland. After the judge determined that, while in the past Academy procedures may have been lax, the organization had essentially followed its rules, Aristarain decided not to take the case to appeal, as ballots were already being mailed to voters and the awards ceremony was about to take place.

Because of the controversy surrounding A Place in the World's disqualification, the Academy adopted in the summer of 1993 new guidelines aimed at clarifying its eligibility rules for the Foreign Language Film category, and especially at making more specific the role played by each crew member. It is also worth mentioning that in its November 2001 press release listing the foreign language submissions to the 74th Academy Awards, the Academy announced that a film from Uruguay (In This Tricky Life) had "qualified this year for the first time", thereby omitting any mention of A Place in the World.

== Awards ==
Wins

- San Sebastian Film Festival: Golden Seashell, Adolfo Aristarain; OCIC Award, Adolfo Aristarain; 1992.
- Nantes Three Continents Festival: Audience Award, Adolfo Aristarain; 1992.
- Goya Awards: Best Foreign Film in Spanish Language; 1993.
- Argentine Film Critics Association Awards: Silver Condor, Best Actor, Federico Luppi; Best Actress, Cecilia Roth; Best Director, Adolfo Aristarain; Best Film; Best Music, Emilio Kauderer; Best New Actor, Gaston Batyi; Best Original Screenplay, Adolfo Aristarain, Alberto Lecchi, and Kathy Saavedra; Best Supporting Actor, José Sacristán; 1993.
- Fribourg International Film Festival: Audience Award, Adolfo Aristarain; 1993.
- Gramado Film Festival: Golden Kikito, Best Latin Film, Adolfo Aristarain; 1993.
- Ondas Awards: Film Award, Best Director, Adolfo Aristarain; 1993.

== See also ==
- List of Argentine films of 1992
- List of Spanish films of 1992
- List of submissions to the 65th Academy Awards for Best Foreign Language Film
- List of Uruguayan submissions for the Academy Award for Best Foreign Language Film
