= 7th Goya Awards =

- Date: 13 March 1993
- Site: Palacio de Congresos de Madrid
- Hosted by: Imanol Arias

Highlights
- Best Film: Belle Époque
- Best Actor: Alfredo Landa; The Sow
- Best Actress: Ariadna Gil; Belle Époque
- Most awards: Belle Époque (9)
- Most nominations: Belle Époque (17)

Television coverage
- Network: TVE

The 7th Goya Awards were presented in Madrid, Spain on 13 March 1993. The gala was hosted by Imanol Arias.

Belle Époque won the award for Best Film.

== Winners and nominees ==
=== Major award nominees ===
Best Film: Belle Époque; The Fencing Master; Jamon Jamon	Best Director: Fernando Trueba – Belle Époque; Bigas Luna – Jamon Jamon; Pedro Olea – The Fencing Master
Best Actor: Alfredo Landa – The Sow; Jorge Sanz – Belle Époque; Javier Bardem – Jamon Jamon	Best Actress: Ariadna Gil – Belle Époque; Penélope Cruz – Jamon Jamon; Assumpta Serna – The Fencing Master
Best Supporting Actor: Fernando Fernán Gómez – Belle Époque; Gabino Diego – Belle Époque; Enrique San Francisco – Club Virginia Orchestra	Best Supporting Actress: Chus Lampreave – Belle Époque; Mary Carmen Ramírez – Belle Époque; Pastora Vega – Too Much Heart
Best Original Screenplay: Belle Époque – Rafael Azcona, José Luis García Sánchez and Fernando Trueba; Jamon Jamon – Cuca Canals and Bigas Luna; Vacas – Julio Médem and Michel Gaztambide	Best Adapted Screenplay: The Fencing Master – Antonio Larreta, Pedro Olea, Arturo Pérez-Reverte and Francisco Prada; The Greek Labyrinth – Rafael Alcázar and Manuel Vázquez Montalbán; I Get Off at the Next Stop, What About You? – Adolfo Marsillach
Best Spanish Language Foreign Film: A Place in the World • Argentina; Like Water for Chocolate • Mexico; Shoot to Kill • Venezuela	Best European Film: Indochine • France; Hidden Agenda • UK; Riff-Raff • UK
Best New Director: Vacas – Julio Médem; Mutant Action – Álex de la Iglesia; Sublet – Chus Gutiérrez

=== Other award nominees ===
Best Cinematography: Belle Époque – José Luis Alcaine; Jamon Jamon – José Luis Alcaine; The Fencing Master – Alfredo F. Mayo; The Sow – Hans Burmann	Best Editing: Belle Époque – Carmen Frías; The Fencing Master – José Salcedo; Mutant Action – Pablo Blanco
Best Art Direction: Belle Époque – Juan Botella; The Fencing Master – Luis Vallés; Mutant Action – José Luis Arrizabalaga	Best Production Supervision: Mutant Action – Esther García; Belle Époque – Cristina Huete; The Fencing Master – Antonio Guillén Rey
Best Sound: Club Virginia Orchestra – Julio Recuero, Gilles Ortion, Enrique Molinero and José Antonio Bermúdez; Belle Époque – Georges Prat and Alfonso Pino; Jamon Jamon – Miguel Rejas and Ricard Casals	Best Special Effects: Mutant Action – Olivier Gleyze, Yves Domenjoud, Jean-Baptiste Bonetto, Bernard Andre Le Boette, Emilio Ruiz and Hipólito Cantero; Vacas – Reyes Abades; Too Much Heart – Lee Wilson
Best Costume Design: The Fencing Master – Javier Artiñano; Belle Époque – Lala Huete; The Anonymous Queen – Yvonne Blake	Best Makeup and Hairstyles: Mutant Action – Paca Almenara; Belle Époque – Ana Ferreira and Ana Lorena; The Fencing Master – Romana González and Josefa Morales
Best Fictional Short Film: El columpio; Huntza; Oro en la pared	Best Documentary Short Film: Primer acorde; Manualidades
Best Original Score: The Fencing Master – José Nieto; Belle Époque – Antoine Duhamel; Vacas – Alberto Iglesias

== Honorary Goya ==
- Imanol Arias
