= The Life Jacket Is Under Your Seat =

- Spanish: El chevrolé
- Directed by: Leonardo Ricagni
- Written by: Leonardo Ricagni; Pato López; Nestor Piñón
- Produced by: Pablo Behrens
- Starring: Jorge Esmoris; Rubén Rada; Leo Maslíah; Hugo Fattoruso; Pastora Vega; Pipo Cipolatti; Tabaré Rivero; Augusto Mazzarelli; Petru Valensky
- Cinematography: Horacio Maira
- Edited by: F. Guariniello; F. Rossi
- Music by: Mario Grigorov
- Release date: 1999
- Running time: 94 min
- Countries: Uruguay, Argentina
- Language: Spanish

The Life Jacket is Under Your Seat (Spanish: El chevrolé) is a 1999 Uruguayan comedy film directed by Leonardo Ricagni, with a screenplay by pato Lopez, based on the novel El regreso del gran Tuleque by Mauricio Rosencof.

== Background ==
The script of the film is based on the novel El regreso del gran Tuleque by Mauricio Rosencof. The film's name is based on the mispronounced name of an authentic Chevrolet car, transformed into a peddler car, which appears in the main scenes.

A key musical feature is the tamboriles. Other musical tunes heard in the soundtrack are from El Peyote Asesino, La Abuela Coca, Plátano Macho, and Hot Jam Band. The postproduction of the sound was performed at Twickenham Film Studios.

The film was nominated for best screenplay at the Argentina Film Critics Association Awards.

== Cast ==
- Jorge Esmoris
- Rubén Rada
- Leo Maslíah
- Hugo Fattoruso
- Pastora Vega
- Pipo Cipolatti
- Tabaré Rivero
- Augusto Mazzarelli
- Petru Valensky
