= 2010 Havana Film Festival =

32nd Havana Film Festival
- Location: Havana, Cuba
- Founded: 1978
- Festival date: 2–12 December 2010
- Website: http://www.habanafilmfestival.com

The 32nd annual Havana Film Festival took place in Havana, Cuba, from 2 December to 12 December 2010.

== Festival line-up ==
=== Feature films ===
==== Films in competition ====
English title	Original title	Director(s)	Country
—N/a	Los Labios	Santiago Loza	Argentina
It's Your Fault	Por Tu Culpa	Anahí Berneri	Argentina; France
Carancho		Pablo Trapero	Argentina
The invisible look	La mirada invisible	Diego Lerman	Argentina; Germany; Spain
—N/a	Como esquecer	Malu de Martino	Brazil
—N/a	Sonhos roubados	Sandra Werneck	Brazil
The Life of Fish	La Vida de los Peces	Matías Bize García	Chile
Post mortem		Pablo Larraín	Chile; Germany; Mexico
—N/a	Casa Vieja	Lester Hamlet	Cuba
—N/a	Larga Distancia	Esteban Insausti	Cuba
—N/a	José Martí: El Ojo del Canario	Fernando Pérez	Cuba; Spain
—N/a	Boleto al Paraiso	Gerardo Chijona	Cuba; Spain
Chicogrande		Felipe Cazals	Mexico
On Childhood	De la infancia	Carlos Carrera González	Mexico
The Good Herbs	Las Buenas Hierbas	María Novaro	Mexico
Summer of Goliath	El Verano de Goliath	Nicolás Pereda	Mexico; Canada; Netherlands
Tarata		Fabrizio Aguilar	Peru
—N/a	Jean Gentil	Laura Amelia Guzmán; Israel Cárdenas	Dominican Republic; Mexico
A Useful Life	La vida útil	Federico Veiroj	Uruguay
—N/a	Des-autorizados	Elia K. Schneider	Venezuela
Habana Eva		Fina Torres	Venezuela; Cuba

==== Films out of competition ====
English title	Original title	Director(s)	Country
Lula, The Son of Brazil	Lula, o filho do Brasil	Fábio Barreto	Brazil

=== First feature ===
English title	Original title	Director(s)	Country
—N/a	El Pasante	Clara Picasso	Argentina
—N/a	Sin retorno	Miguel Cohan	Argentina; Spain
—N/a	Rompecabezas	Natalia Smirnoff	Argentina
—N/a	180°	Eduardo Vaisman	Brazil
—N/a	5xFavela, Agora por Nós Mesmos	Wagner Novais	Brazil
Besouro		João Daniel Tikhomiroff	Brazil
—N/a	No olho da rua	Rogério Corrêa	Brazil
Drama		Matias Lira	Chile
Lucia		Niles Jamil Atallah Gonsalves	Chile
—N/a	Retratos en un mar de mentiras	Carlos Gaviria	Colombia
The Colours of the Mountain	Los colores de la montaña	Carlos César Arbeláez	Colombia; Panama
Of Love and Other Demons	Del Amor y otros Demonios	Hilda Hidalgo	Costa Rica; Colombia
Cold Water from the Sea	Agua fría de mar	Paz Fabrega	Costa Rica; France; Mexico; Spain
—N/a	Afinidades	Jorge Perugorría	Cuba; Spain
—N/a	La Bodega	Ray Figueroa	Guatemala
Alamar		Pedro González-Rubio	Mexico
Leap Year	Año Bisiesto	Michel Rowe	Mexico
Abel		Diego Luna	Mexico
Martha		Marcelino Islas Hernández	Mexico
October	Octubre	Diego Vega; Daniel Vera	Peru; Spain
Norberto's Deadline	Norberto apenas tarde	Daniel Hendler	Uruguay; Argentina
Hermano		Marcel Rasquin	Venezuela

== Awards ==
=== Coral ===
- Best Feature Film:
  - First prize: A Useful life by Federico Veiroj
  - Second prize: Post Mortem by Pablo Larraín
  - Third prize: The Good Herbs by María Novaro
  - Special Jury prize: The Invisible Look by Diego Lerman
- Best Directing: Pablo Larraín for Post Mortem
- Best Screenplay: Pablo Larraín and Mateo Iiribarren for Post Mortem
- Best Actor: Alfredo Castro for Post Mortem
- Best Actress: Antonia Zegers for Post Mortem
- Best Cinematography: Damián García for Chicogrande
- Best Art Direction: Erick Grass for José Martí: el Ojo del Canario
- Best Editing: Eliane Katz for It's Your Fault
- Best Original Music: Santiago Chávez and Judith de León for The Good Herbs
- Best Soundtrack: Raúl Locatelli and Daniel Yafalián for A Useful Life
- Best First Feature:
  - First prize: Alamar by Pedro González-Rubio
  - Second prize: October by Diego Vega and Daniel Vega
  - Third prize: Of Love and Other Demons by Hilda Hidalgo
  - Special Jury prize: Hermano by Marcel Rasquin

=== FRIPESCI ===
- Best Feature Film: Post Mortem by Pablo Larraín
