= Leo Maslíah =

Uruguayan musician, humorist and writer (born 1954)

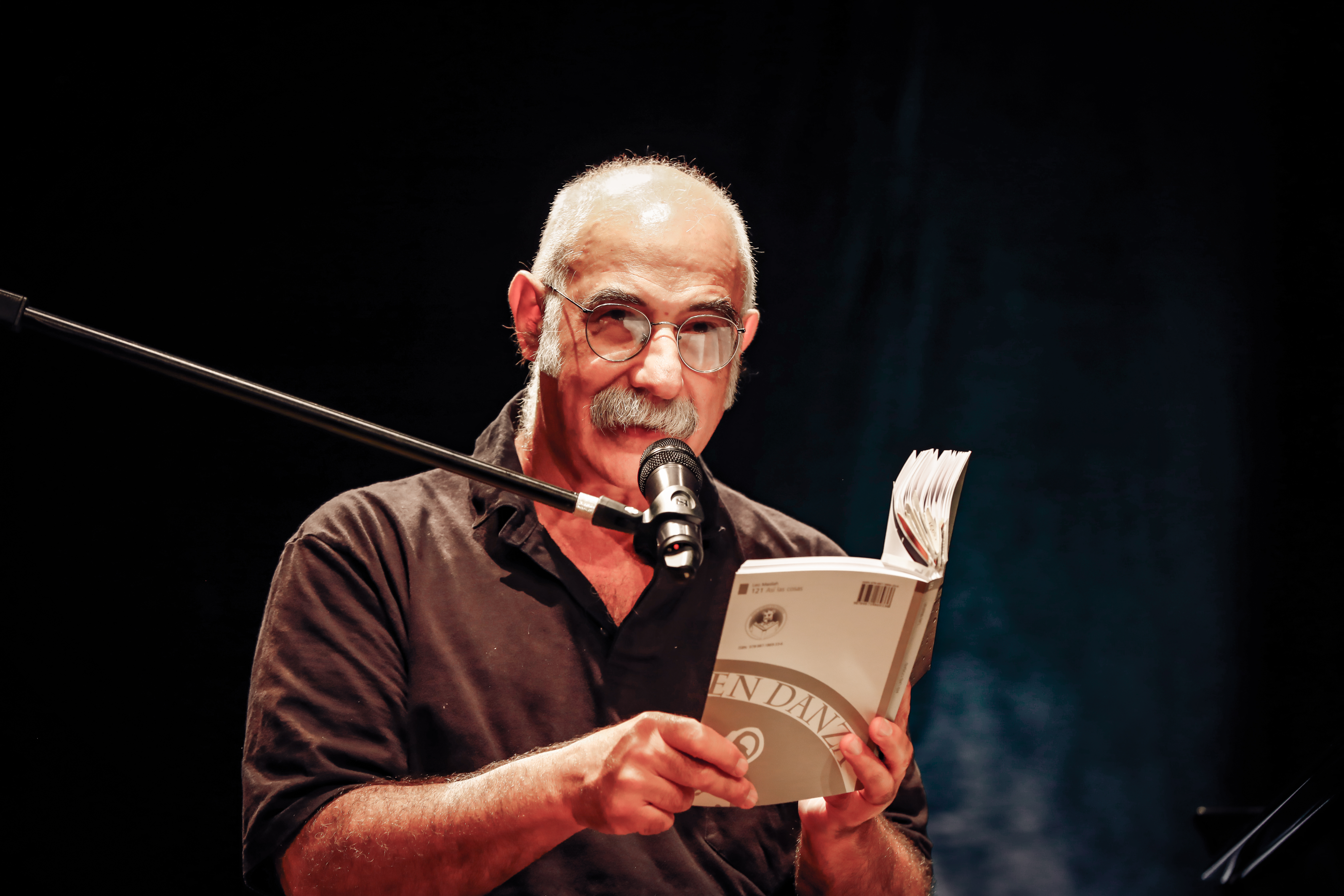
- Leo Masliah (2023)
- Born: July 26, 1954; Montevideo, Uruguay
- Occupations: musician, humorist and writer
- Awards: Premio Morosoli
- Website: Leo Maslíah

Leo Maslíah (born 1954) is a Uruguayan musician, humorist and writer.

Born in 1954 in Montevideo, he started writing and composing in 1978, usually incorporating humour in his works.

After a considerable success in the Uruguayan underground movement, he successfully disembarked in Buenos Aires, Argentina in 1982. He slowly gained popularity, had concerts in Chile, Peru, Cuba, Brazil, Paraguay and Spain among others.

His music resists classification. It results from an original mix of personal experiments, popular music, classical composition - including electroacoustic materials - and jazz. He often bases his pieces on the minimalistic repetition of short elements. His lyrics include frequent puns. Overall, his production adopts a tone both ironic and critical, always intelligent and witty, sometimes nihilistic. He recorded more than 40 albums, most of them released in Uruguay and Argentina. In 2003 his opera "Maldoror" was performed in the Teatro Colón.

He also wrote over 40 books with novels, short stories and plays. 10 of his plays were taken to theater. The Konex Foundation of Argentina awarded him "Merit for humour in literature" in 1994.

== Artistic activity ==
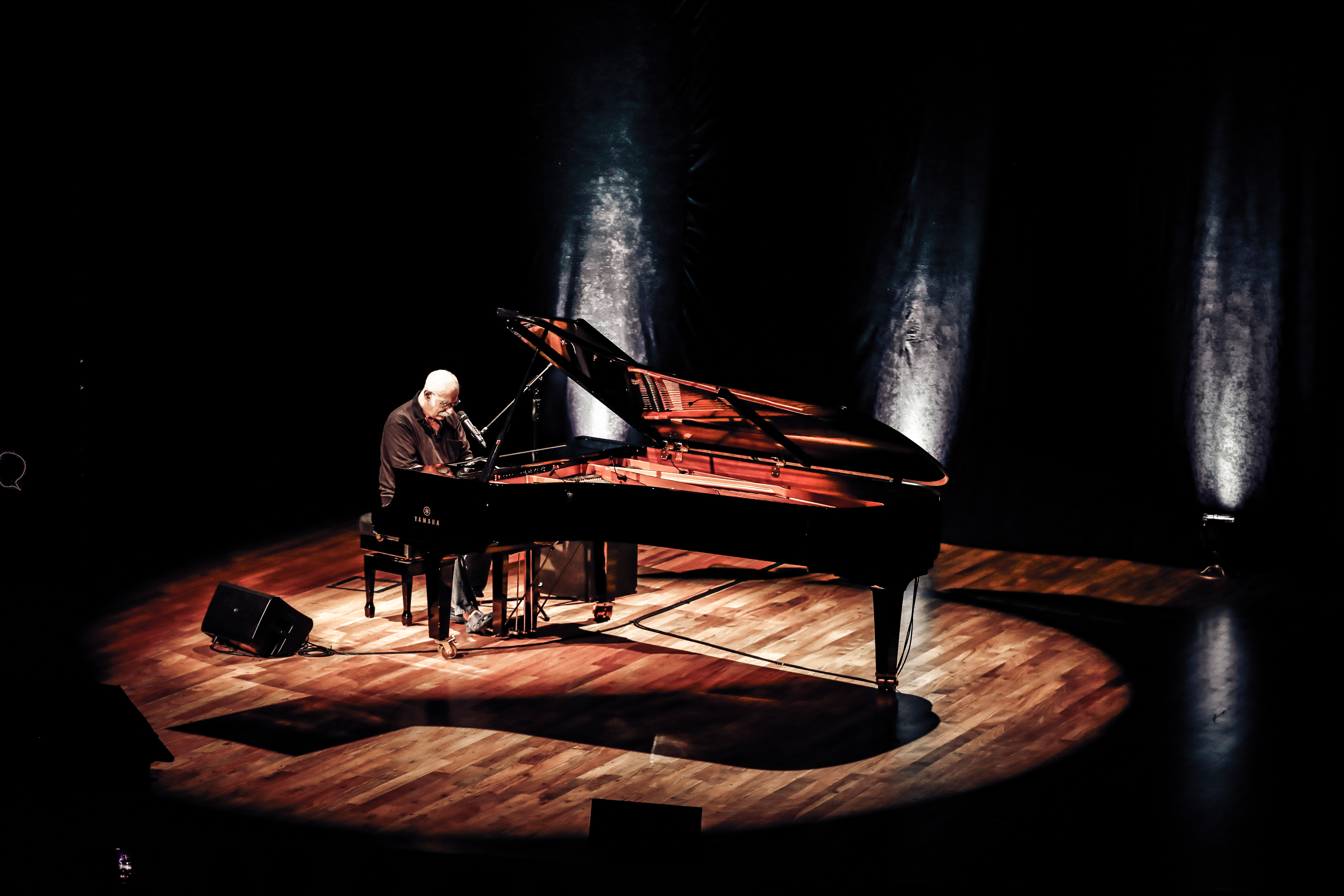
Masliah in Buenos Aires, 2023.

He was born on July 26, 1954, in Montevideo. He studied piano with Bertha Chadicov and Wilser Rossi, harmony with Nydia Pereyra Lisaso, organ with Manuel Salsamendi, and composition with Coriún Aharonián and Graciela Paraskevaídis. He appeared for the first time in public in 1974 as an organ soloist performing a Haendel concerto. As of 1978 he develops an intense activity as author and performer of popular music, having performed in many countries of South America and Europe.

In 1981 his electroacoustic composition "Llanto" was included in the programming of the annual festival of the International Society of Contemporary Music (SIMC) held in Brussels, Belgium. Uruguayan orchestras perform several of his symphonic works. His chamber works are part of the repertoire of some national and foreign performers. In 1994 he was distinguished by the Konex Foundation of Argentina among the hundred best figures of Argentine letters of the decade 1984–1994.

In June 2003, his opera Maldoror, based on the book Los cantos de Maldoror by the Count of Lautréamont (the famous French poet Isidore Ducasse born in Uruguay), was premiered (and several performances were performed) at the Teatro Colón in the city of Buenos Aires. In 1998 he received the Morosoli Award in recognition of his career in popular music, and in 2012 the Uruguayan Ministry of Education and Culture's annual music award in the jazz/fusion/Latin category for his composition "Algo Ritmo" .

As a composer and performer of music of the so-called "cult" genre, he participated in concerts and recordings of contemporary music from Uruguay, Argentina and other countries. He also edited, as a soloist, more than 40 record works. Trees won in 2008, in Argentina, the Gardel Award for the best instrumental album and Leo Maslíah plays Bach in 2020 the award for the best classical music album. Leo Maslíah also published nearly 40 books, including novels, collections of short stories and plays. In 2019 he was the winner of the National Literature Awards with his work Literature with fences.

Several of his plays were premiered in Montevideo and/or Buenos Aires with staging by the author or other directors. His works Telecomedia and El mouse were awarded the prize of the Ministry of Education and Culture of Uruguay, in the "comedy" category, in 2000 and 2013.

== Discography ==
=== In Uruguay ===
- Cansiones barias (Ayuí / Tacuabé. 1980)
- Falta un vidrio (Ayuí / Tacuabé a/e31k. 1981)
- Recital especial (Ayuí / Tacuabé a/e40k. 1983)
- Canciones & negocios de otra índole (La Batuta. 1984)
- Extraños en tu casa (La Batuta. 1985)
- Leo Maslíah en español (Ayuí / Tacuabé a/e54k. 1986)
- Leo Maslíah y Jorge Cumbo en dúplex (Orfeo. 1987)
- Leo Maslíah en vivo (Ayuí / Tacuabé a/e65k. 1987)
- Buscado vivo (Variety)
- I lique roc (Orfeo. 1988)
- Leo Maslíah en el Teatro Circular con Liese Lange (Orfeo. 1989)
- El tortelín y el canelón (withHéctor De Benedictis) (Infantil) (Orfeo. 1989)
- Persianas (Orfeo. 1990)
- Sin palabras 1 (Ayuí / Tacuabé a/e92k. 1991)
- 13 años (Orfeo. 1991)
- Tortugas (Orfeo. 1993)
- Sin novedad (Recopilación) (Orfeo. 1993)
- No juegues con fuego porque lo podes apagar (Audio version of the play of the same name. Recorded in Montevideo in 1993. Perro Andaluz. 1993)
- Sin palabras 2 (Orfeo, Montevideo. 1994)
- Zanguango (Ayuí / Tacuabé ae161cd. 1996)
- Taddei-Maslíah (Ayuí / Tacuabé ae186cd. 1998)
- Canciones desoídas (Recopilación) (Ayuí / Tacuabé. 1999)
- Textualmente 1 (Perro Andaluz. 2001)
- Textualmente 2 (Perro Andaluz. 2002)
- Leo Maslíah en hispania (recorded de 1989 y 2002. Perro Andaluz, Montevideo. 2003)
- Improvisaciones (with Hernán Ríos. Perro Andaluz. 2003)
- Textualmente 3: el neoliberalismo y otros desfalcos (Perro Andaluz. 2004)
- Árboles (Perro Andaluz. 2005)
- Clásicos (Perro Andaluz. 2005)
- Irrestricto (recorded with Jorge Lazaroff en 1984. Perro Andaluz. 2006)
- Recital soplón (with the Montevideo Symphonic Band. Perro Andaluz. 2006)
- Contemporáneo (Menosata. 2007)
- Entreverados (with Carmen Prieto. Menosata. 2007)
- Piano (Menosata, 2008)
- Bases de diálogo (with Sandra Corizzo. Perro Andaluz. 2008)
- Cantanotas (con Lucía Gatti. Perro Andaluz PA 4850–2. 2011)
- La Orquestita (Perro Andaluz PA 5063–2. 2011)
- Música no alineada. (Perro Andaluz PA 5539–2. 2013)
- Leo Maslíah en 'Autores en vivo'. (DVD) (Perro Andaluz PA 5718–9. 2013)
- Leo Maslíah con banda. (DVD) (Perro Andaluz PA 5718–9. 2014)
- Luna sola. (Perro Andaluz PA 6125–2. 2014)
- Montevideo ambiguo (with Hugo Fattoruso. Montevideo Music Group 6450–2. 2015)
- Música y otras mentiras (with Andrés Bedó. Perro Andaluz PA 6868–2. 2016)
- Dos pequeños conciertos para piano (Perro Andaluz PA 6866–2. 2016

=== In Argentina ===
- Desconfíe del prójimo (RCA. 1985)
- Punc (RCA. 1987)
- Buscado vivo (Interdisc SLI 67.511. 1987)
- El tortelín y el canelón (with Héctor De Benedictis) (Infantil) (El Chancho Records. 1989)
- Tema de amor a María Julia (Barca. 1990)
- La mano viene pesada (Barca. 1991)
- Aunque voce nao acredite... Maslíah existe! (Recopilación) (Barca. 1994)
- Opera, castidad & yogur diet (Barca. 1995)
- Lo mejor de Leo Maslíah (Recopilación) (BMG. 1997)
- Zanguango (Polygram. 1998)
- Leo Maslíah y pico (World Music BA. 1999)
- Textualmente 1 (EPSA MUSIC. 2002)
- Textualmente 2 (EPSA MUSIC. 2003)
- Textualmente 3: el neoliberalismo y otros desfalcos (EPSA MUSIC. 2004)
- Clásicos (EPSA MUSIC. 2005)
- Árboles (EPSA MUSIC. 2007)
- Entreverados (Junto a Carmen Prieto. EPSA MUSIC. 2007)
- Bases de diálogo (con Sandra Corizzo. EPSA MUSIC. 2008)
- Jorge de la Vega por Leo Maslíah (with Lucía Gatti y Pablo Somma, Biblioteca Nacional del Argentina. 2010)
- 40 años (Club del Disco. 2018)
- Cine Mudo (Club del Disco. 2019)
- Leo Maslíah toca Bach (Club del Disco. 2019)
- Leo Maslíah en trío con Tato Bolognini y Marco Messina (Club del Disco. 2020)
- Electroacústico (Club del Disco. 2020)
- Jazz (Club del Disco. 2021)
- Últimas canciones (Club del Disco. 2021)

=== In other countries ===
- Leo Maslíah en el Café del Cerro (Alerce, Santiago de Chile. 1989)
- Eslabones (Big World Music, Nueva York. 2000)
- Textualmente 2 (18 Chulos Records, Madrid. 2002)

=== Reissues ===
- Canciones y negocios de otra índole (Ayuí / Tacuabé a/e56k. 1987)
- Extraños en tu casa (Ayuí / Tacuabé. a/e57k. 1987)
- Sin Palabras 2 (Perro Andaluz. 2001)
- No Juegues con fuego porque lo podés apagar (Perro Andaluz. 2001)
- Falta un vidrio / Recital especial (Ayuí / Tacuabé A/E 251, 2002)
- El tortelín y el canelón (con Héctor De Benedictis) (Infantil) (Perro Andaluz, 2002)
- El tortelín y el canelón (con Héctor De Benedictis) (Infantil) (EPSA MUSIC. 2003)
- Canciones & negocios de otra índole / Extraños en tu casa (Ayuí / Tacuabé A/E 313, 2007)

=== Videos ===
- Zanguango
- La Papafrita

== Filmography ==
- El chevrolé (1999)
- Qué absurdo es haber crecido (2000)

== Published books ==
Año	Título	ISBN	Editorial	Otros
1983	Hospital especial		Imago	Montevideo poemas y letras de canciones
1984	Un detective privado ante algunos problemas no del todo ajenos a la llamada "música popular"			cuadernos del TAMP Rosario, Argentina relato
1985	Historia transversal de Floreal Menéndez		Ediciones de la Flor	Argentina 2.ª edición: 1992 novela
1987	El show de José Fin		Ediciones de la Flor	Argentina; 2.ª edición: 1992 novela
1987	Teléfonos públicos		Monte Sexto	Montevideo cuentos
	Tres obras de teatro		Ediciones de Uno	Yoea, Montevideo teatro
1989	El lado oscuro de la pelvis	950-515-035-0	Ediciones de la Flor	Argentina, 2.ª edición: 1992 novela
1990	La tortuga		Ediciones de la Flor	Argentina; 2.ª edición: 1992 cuentos
1991	Tarjeta roja	950-515-122-5	Ediciones de la Flor	Argentina novela
1991	Zanahorias	9974-32-001-1	Ediciones Trilce	Montevideo novela
1991	Pastor de cabras perfectas		Senda	Bahía Blanca, Argentina poesía
1992	La mujer loba ataca de nuevo	9789871489169	Yoea	Montevideorelatos
1992	El animal que todos llevamos dentro	950-515-126-8	Ediciones de la Flor	Argentina cuentos
1993	El triple salto mortal	950-515-130-6	Ediciones de la Flor	Argentina cuentos
1993	Mentirillas	9505155743	Arca	Montevideo novela
1994	El gentilhombre		Yoea	Montevideo relatos
1994	La miopía de Rodríguez	950-515-138-1	Ediciones de la Flor	Argentina cuentos
1994	La extraordinaria aventura de Arthur Gordon Pam		Yoea	Montevideo relatos
1995	La décima pista	950-515-145-4	Ediciones de la Flor	Argentina novela
1996	La buena noticia	950-515-153-5	Ediciones de la Flor	Argentina cuentos
1997	Ositos	950-515-159-4	Ediciones de la Flor	Argentina novela
1997	Signos		Aymara	Montevideo novela
1998	No juegues con fuego porque lo podés apagar	9505155638	Ediciones de la Flor	Argentina
1999	Líneas	9505151721	Ediciones de la Flor	Argentina novela
2000	Carta a un escritor latinoamericano y otros insultos	950-515-178-0	Ediciones de la Flor	Argentina cuentos
2001	Telecomedia y otras teatreces	9505151845	Ediciones de la Flor	Argentina
2002	Servicio de Habitación	9505155700	Ediciones de la Flor	Argentina novela
2002	Estatutos	9974766095	Cauce Editorial	Montevideo novela
2003	Horóscopos y otras sentencias	9505151888	Ediciones de la Flor	Argentina cuentos
2004	Libretos	950-515-193-4	Ediciones de la Flor	Argentina novela
2005	Mentirillas seguido de El Lado Oscuro de la Pelvis	950-515-574-3	Ediciones de la Flor	Argentina novelas
2005	No juegues con fuego porque lo podés apagar	950-515-563-8	Ediciones de la Flor	Argentina reedición
2005	El oráculo	9974-7805-3-5	Perro andaluz ediciones	Coescrito con Sanopi. Uruguay cuentos ilustrados.
2006	Tres idiotas en busca de una imbécil y otras piezas	9505154380	Ediciones de la Flor	Argentina teatro
2008	Cuentos impensados	978-9974-96-476-1	Menosata	Uruguay cuentos
2010	La mujer loba ataca de nuevo	9789871489169	Ediciones Godot	Argentina cuentos
2010	El crucero Yarará	9789871489190	Ediciones Godot	Argentina novela
2011	Cuentos de Pompeyo	978-987-1489-26-8	Ediciones Godot	Argentina cuentos
2012	Fábulas, parábolas y paradojas	978-9974-8313-7-7	Criatura Editora	Uruguay cuentos
2013	Así las cosas	978-9974-99-038-8	Menosata	Uruguay poesía
2013	Diccionario privado	978-9974-8360-7-5	Criatura editora	Uruguay diccionario
2014	Sagrado Colegio	978-9974-8452-7-5	Criatura Editora	Uruguay novela
2014	Crucigramas	978-9974-8361-2-9	Perro andaluz ediciones	Coescrito con Sanopi. Uruguay cuentos ilustrados.
2014	El último dictador y la primera dama / El ratón	978-9974-8419-7-0	Criatura editora	Uruguay teatro
2015	El bobo del pueblo y otras incorrecciones	978-9974-8503-9-2	Criatura editora	Uruguay cuentos
2017	Literatura con vallas		Criatura Editorial	Uruguay cuentos
