= Ana Guevara and Leticia Jorge =

Uruguayan film directors and screenwriters

Ana Guevara
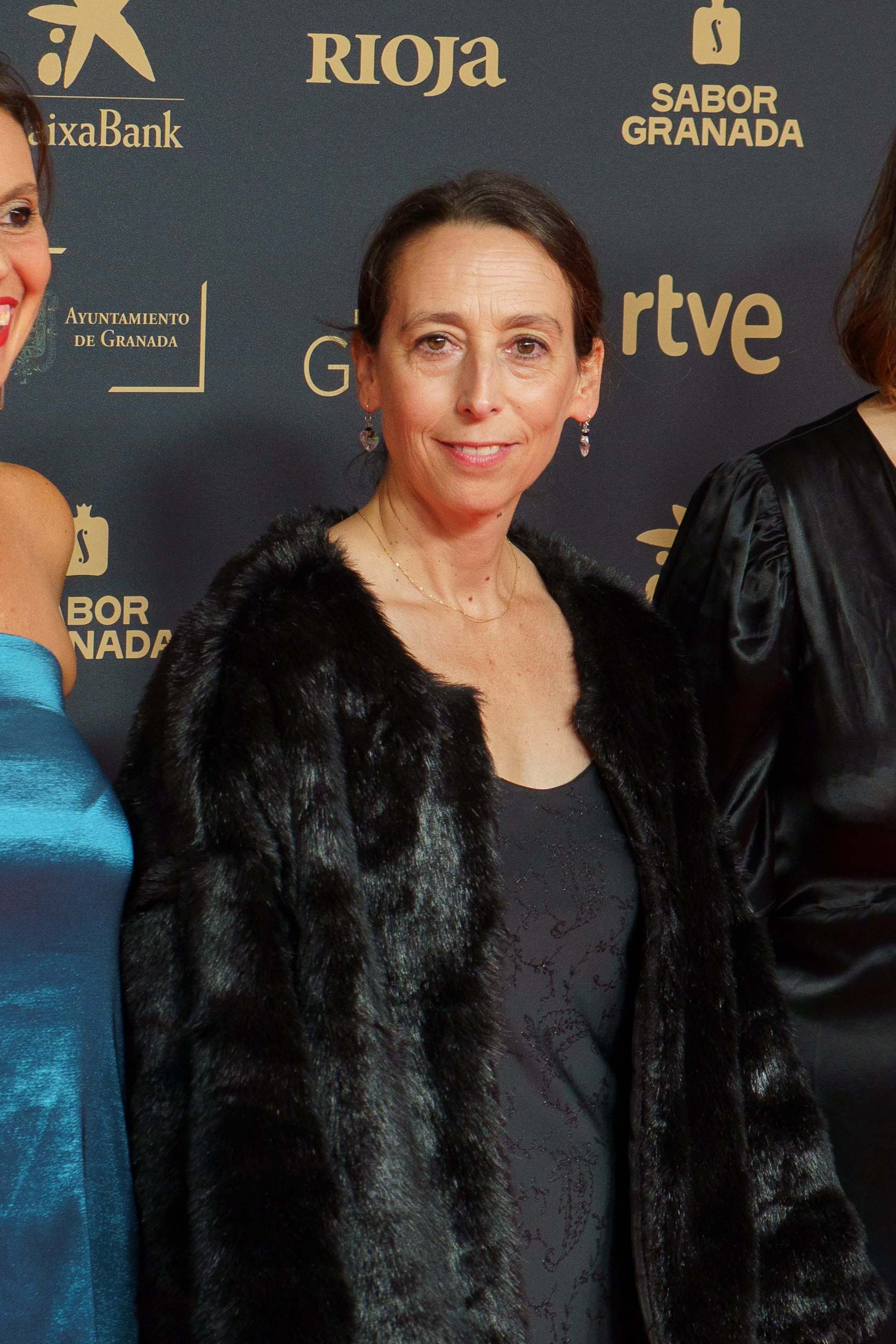
- Born: 1980; Montevideo
- Occupation: Film director, screenwriter

Leticia Jorge
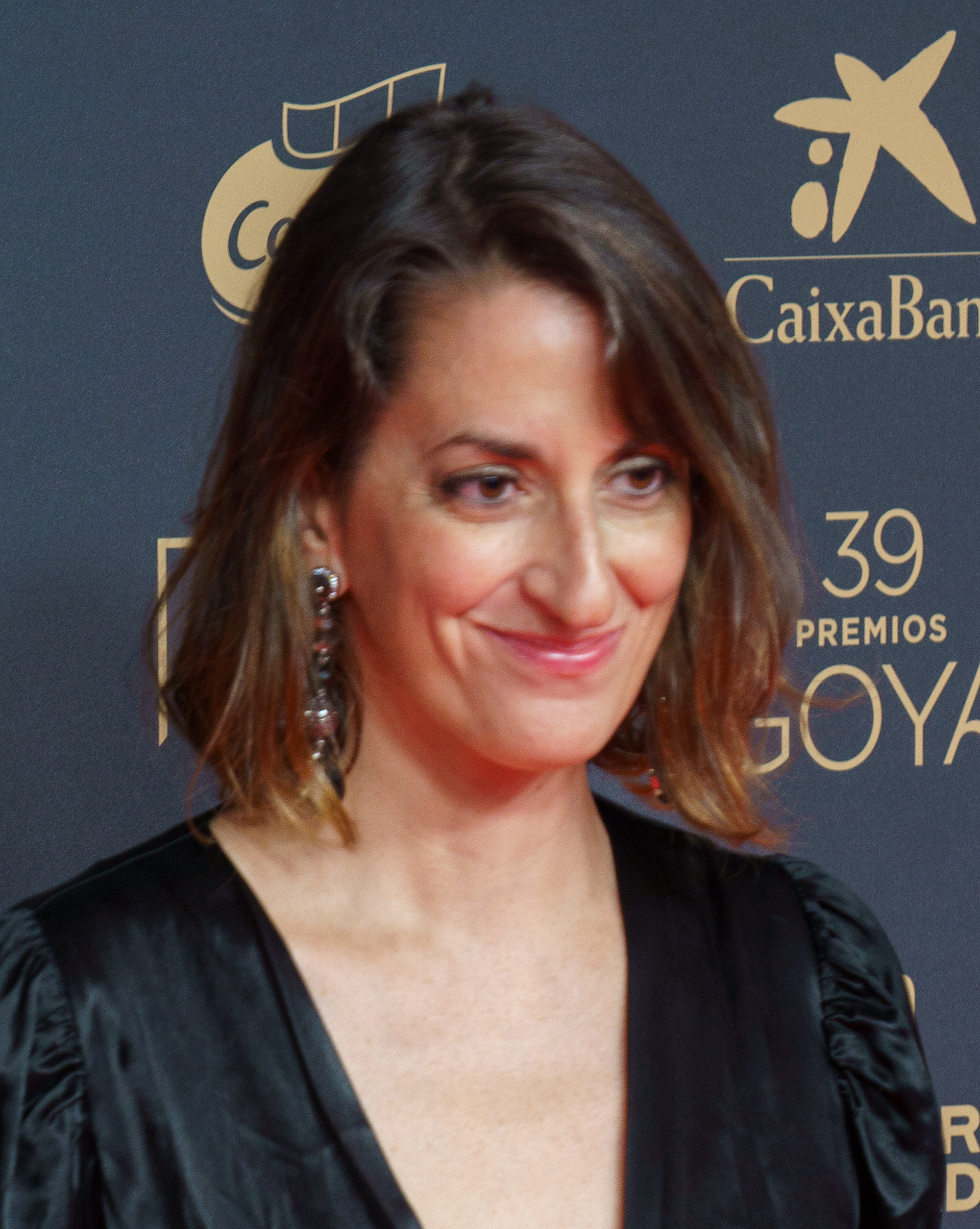
- Born: 1981; Montevideo
- Occupation: Film director

Ana Guevara Pose (born 1980) and Leticia Jorge Romero (born 1981) are Uruguayan film directors and screenwriters. They have collaborated on a number of films, including the feature films Tanta agua ("So Much Water") (2013), Alelí (2019), and Agarrame fuerte ("Don't You Let Me Go") (2024).

Both women were born in Montevideo, Uruguay. They met and began collaborating while studying at the Catholic University of Uruguay.

Their first feature film, Tanta agua ("So Much Water") (2013), was written and directed by both women. The film features a chiropractor (Nestor Guzzini) attempting to bond with his two children (Malu Chouza and Joaquin Castiglioni) during a rainy vacation. It won the Knight Ibero-American Competition at the 30th Miami International Film Festival (MIFF). Alelí (2019) was a dark comedy written by both women and directed by Jorge. The titular house is the subject of infighting between three siblings (Néstor Guzzini, Mirella Pascual, and Romina Peluffo) following the death of the family patriarch. Alelí was Uruguay's submission for the Academy Award for Best International Feature Film. Agarrame fuerte ("Don't You Let Me Go") (2024), directed by both women, premiered at the Tribeca Festival. In the film, Adela (Chiara Hourcade) grapples with the death of her best friend, Elena (Vicky Jorge).

== Filmography ==
- El cuarto del fondo ("The Guest Room", short film) (2006)
- Corredores de verano ("Summer Runners", short film) (2009)
- Tanta agua ("So Much Water") (2013)
- 60 Primaveras ("60 Candles", short film) (2015)
- Alelí (2019)
- Agarrame fuerte ("Don't You Let Me Go") (2024)
