= A Moonless Night =

2014 film

- Promotional release poster
- Directed by: Germán Tejeira
- Written by: Germán Tejeira
- Starring: Roberto Suárez
- Release dates: 19 September 2014 (San Sebastián); 28 May 2015 (Uruguay)
- Running time: 78 minutes
- Countries: Uruguay; Argentina
- Language: Spanish

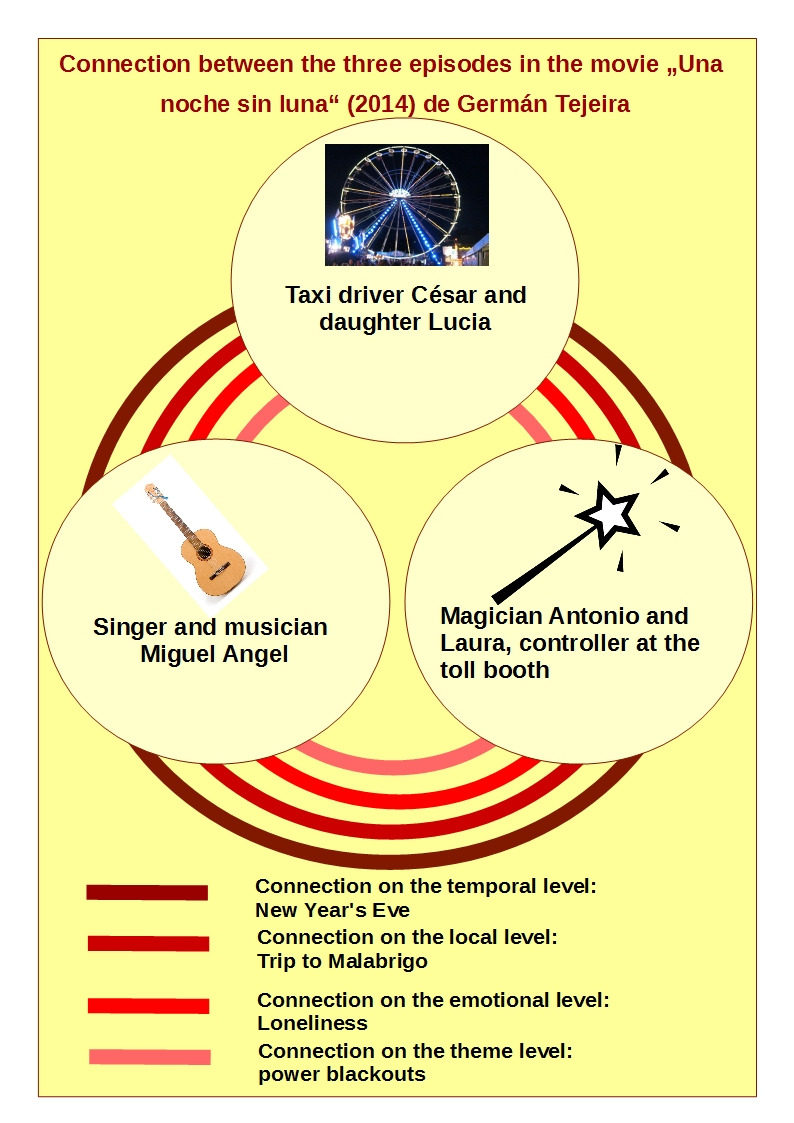
Connection between the three episodes in the film

A Moonless Night (Spanish: Una noche sin luna) is a 2014 drama film written and directed by Germán Tejeira. The film was selected as the Uruguayan entry for the Best Foreign Language Film at the 88th Academy Awards but it was not nominated.

== Cast ==
- Roberto Suárez as Antonio
- Daniel Melingo as Molgota
- Marcel Keoroglian as César
- Elisa Gagliano as Laura

== See also ==
- List of submissions to the 88th Academy Awards for Best Foreign Language Film
- List of Uruguayan submissions for the Academy Award for Best Foreign Language Film
