= The Broken Glass Theory =

2021 film

- Film poster
- Directed by: Diego Fernández
- Starring: Jorge Temponi
- Production companies: Parking Films; Cordón Films; Okna Produçoes; Tarea Fina
- Release date: 26 August 2021
- Running time: 80 minutes
- Countries: Uruguay; Argentina; Brazil
- Language: Spanish

The Broken Glass Theory (Spanish: La Teoría de los Vidrios Rotos) is a 2021 comedy film directed by Diego Fernández. It was selected as the Uruguayan entry for the Best International Feature Film at the 94th Academy Awards, but was not nominated. It is a co-production between Uruguay, Argentina and Brazil.

== Plot ==
Claudio, an insurance expert, investigates a series of car fires in a small town.

== Cast ==
- Jorge Temponi
- Carlos Frasca
- Martín Slipak
- Guillermo Arengo

== See also ==
- List of submissions to the 94th Academy Awards for Best International Feature Film
- List of Uruguayan submissions for the Academy Award for Best International Feature Film
