= Acne (film) =

2008 film

- Directed by: Federico Veiroj
- Music by: Los Fatales
- Release dates: May 2008 (Cannes); 12 December 2008
- Running time: 87 minutes
- Countries: Uruguay; Argentina; Mexico; Spain
- Language: Spanish

Acne (Spanish: Acné) is a 2008 Uruguayan coming-of-age film directed by Federico Veiroj. The film showed in the Director's Fortnight portion of the 2008 Cannes Film Festival.

== Plot ==
A thirteen-year-old guy desperately looking for his first kiss against all odds.

== Cast ==
- Alejandro Tocar (Rafael)
- Julia Catalá
- Belén Pouchan (Nicole)
- Gustavo Melnik
- Jenny Goldstein
- Yoel Bercovici
- Igal Label
- David Blankleider
- Laura Piperno
- Verónica Perrotta
- Néstor Guzzini
