= The Apostate (film) =

2015 film

- Theatrical release poster
- Directed by: Federico Veiroj
- Written by: Federico Veiroj
- Starring: Álvaro Ogalla
- Release dates: 11 September 2015 (TIFF); 2 October 2015 (Spain)
- Countries: Uruguay; Spain
- Language: Spanish

The Apostate (Spanish: El apóstata) is a 2015 Uruguayan-Spanish comedy-drama film written and directed by Federico Veiroj, the plot follows a man pursuing apostasy from the Catholic Church. During the arduous bureaucratic process, he will recall the intermittent relationship he has with a cousin, some cruel acts of his childhood, his link with a foreign spirituality and his difficulties in following the paternal path.

== Cast ==
- Álvaro Ogalla as Gonzalo
- Bárbara Lennie as Maite
- Marta Larralde as Pilar
- Vicky Peña as Madre
- Joaquín Climent as Padre

== Release ==
The film was screened in the Contemporary World Cinema section of the 2015 Toronto International Film Festival, where it debuted on 11 September 2015.

== Reception ==
The film has a score of 66% on Metacritic.
