= Cristina Morán =

Uruguayan journalist and actor

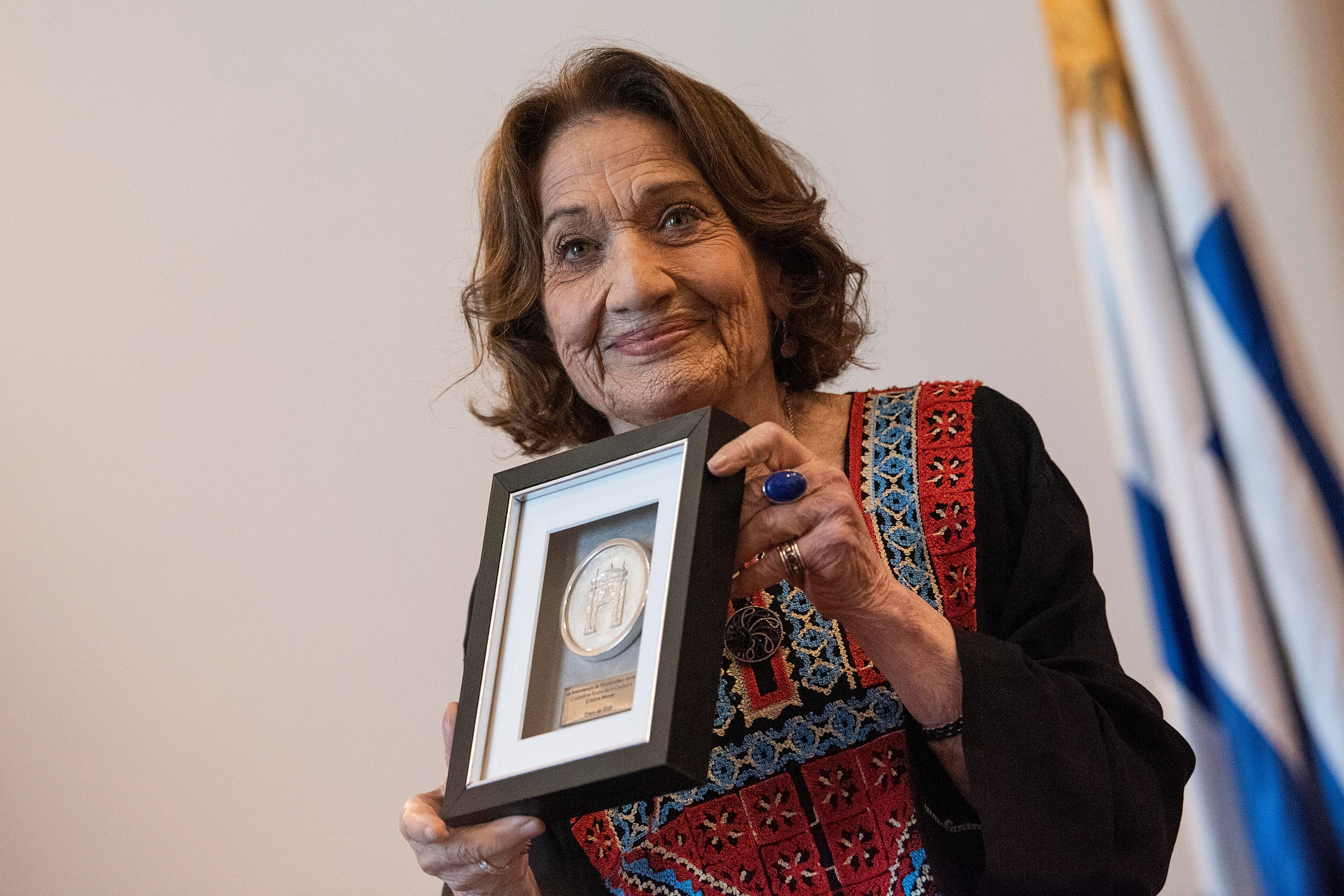
- Morán in 2020
- Born: Iris Fariña Romano; 17 August 1930
- Died: 22 September 2023 (aged 93); Montevideo, Uruguay
- Occupations: Actress, presenter, television presenter, journalist
- Years active: 1948 – 2023
- Spouse: Luis López (deceased)
- Children: Carmen Morán

Iris Fariña Romano (17 August 1930 – 22 September 2023), better known by her stage name Cristina Morán, was a Uruguayan journalist, radio and television personality and actress. She was a notable pioneer in the nascent television of her country, back in the 1950s, at Channel 10.

Her career spanned 75 years.

Morán was also a film actress in several productions, including Alelí and Julio, felices por siempre. In Anina she was a voice actress.

In 2010 she received the Iris Award for her career.

Cristina Morán died on 22 September 2023, at the age of 93. Her daughter Carmen Morán is also a television personality.
