= Belmonte (film) =

2018 film

- Theatrical release poster
- Directed by: Federico Veiroj
- Written by: Federico Veiroj
- Starring: Gonzalo Delgado
- Release date: 7 September 2018 (TIFF)
- Running time: 74 minutes
- Country: Uruguay
- Language: Spanish

Belmonte is a 2018 Uruguayan drama film directed by Federico Veiroj. It was screened in the Contemporary World Cinema section at the 2018 Toronto International Film Festival.

== Cast ==
- Gonzalo Delgado as Javier Belmonte
- Olivia Molinaro Eijo as Celeste Belmonte
- Jeannette Sauksteliskis as Jeanne
