= Alelí =

2019 film

- Film poster
- Directed by: Leticia Jorge
- Starring: Néstor Guzzini
- Release dates: 2 October 2019 (Biarritz); 5 March 2020 (Uruguay)
- Running time: 88 minutes
- Countries: Uruguay; Argentina
- Language: Spanish

Alelí is a 2019 Uruguayan-Argentine comedy-drama film directed by Leticia Jorge and written by Néstor Guzzini. It was selected as the Uruguayan entry for the Best International Feature Film at the 93rd Academy Awards, but it was not nominated.

== Synopsis ==
Following the death of their father, siblings begin to argue over the sale of family house.

== Cast ==
- Néstor Guzzini as Ernesto
- Mirella Pascual as Lilián
- Cristina Morán as Alba
- Romina Peluffo as Silvana

== See also ==
- List of submissions to the 93rd Academy Awards for Best International Feature Film
- List of Uruguayan submissions for the Academy Award for Best International Feature Film
