= Don't You Let Me Go =

- Theatrical release poster
- Directed by: Ana Guevara; Leticia Jorge
- Written by: Ana Guevara; Leticia Jorge
- Produced by: Agustina Chiarino
- Starring: Chiara Hourcade; Victoria Jorge; Eva Dans
- Cinematography: Soledad Rodríguez
- Edited by: Lucía Casal; Stephanie Tabárez
- Music by: Luciano Supervielle
- Production companies: A-One Films; Bocacha Films
- Release dates: June 8, 2024 (Tribeca); October 24, 2024 (Uruguay)
- Running time: 74 minutes
- Country: Uruguay
- Language: Spanish

Don't You Let Me Go (Spanish: Agarrame fuerte) is a 2024 Uruguayan drama film written and directed by Ana Guevara and Leticia Jorge. Starring Chiara Hourcade, Victoria Jorge and Eva Dans, it follows a girl's grieving process after the untimely death of her best friend.

The film had its world premiere at the 23rd Tribeca Film Festival on 8 June 2024, where it was honored with the Nora Ephron Award. It was theatrically released in Uruguay on 24 October. It was also selected as the Uruguayan entry for the Best International Feature Film at the 98th Academy Awards, but it was not nominated.

== Synopsis ==
Adela, a 39-year-old woman, suffers the untimely loss of her best friend, Elena. During the wake, she feels disconnected from the solemn rituals, realizing the absurdity of saying goodbye to someone so dear. Consumed by grief, Adela embarks on a journey back in time: an autumn ten years earlier, where her friend was waiting to share moments together.

== Cast ==
- Chiara Hourcade as Adela
- Victoria Jorge as Elena
- Eva Dans as Luci
- Fernando Amaral as Vigilant

== Production ==
Principal photography took place in 2022 at Balneario Solís, Maldonado.

== Release ==
Don't You Let Me Go had its world premiere on June 8, 2024, at the 23rd Tribeca Film Festival, then screened on October 10, 2024, at the 61st Antalya Golden Orange Film Festival, on October 18, 2024, at the 12th New Cinema Festival, on October 20, 2024, at the 21st Piriápolis Film Festival, on December 1, 2024, at the 35th Singapore International Film Festival, and on April 4, 2025, at the 26th Buenos Aires International Festival of Independent Cinema.

The film was released commercially on October 24, 2024, in Uruguayan theaters.

== Accolades ==
Award / Festival	Ceremony date	Category	Recipient(s)	Result	Ref.
Tribeca Film Festival	13 June 2024	Best International Narrative Feature	Don't You Let Me Go	Nominated	
Tribeca Film Festival	13 June 2024	Nora Ephron Award	Don't You Let Me Go	Won	
Antalya Golden Orange Film Festival	14 October 2024	Best International Feature Film	Don't You Let Me Go	Won	
ACCU Awards	11 December 2024	Best Uruguayan Feature Film	Don't You Let Me Go	Won	
ACCU Awards	11 December 2024	Best Director	Ana Guevara, Leticia Jorge	Won	
ACCU Awards	11 December 2024	Best Actress	Chiara Hourcade	Won	
ACCU Awards	11 December 2024	Best Supporting Actress	Eva Dans	Won	
ACCU Awards	11 December 2024	Best Screenplay	Ana Guevara, Leticia Jorge	Won	
ACCU Awards	11 December 2024	Best Cinematography	Soledad Rodríguez	Won	
ACCU Awards	11 December 2024	Best Original Score	Luciano Supervielle	Nominated	
ACCU Awards	11 December 2024	Best Sound	Rafael Álvarez, Juan Ignacio Giobio	Won	
ACCU Awards	11 December 2024	Best Art Direction	Cecilia Guerriero	Won	
ACCU Awards	11 December 2024	Revelation Award	Victoria Jorge	Nominated	
Havana Film Festival	14 December 2024	Colón de Oro	Don't You Let Me Go	Nominated	
Goya Awards	8 February 2025	Best Ibero-American Film	Don't You Let Me Go	Nominated	

== See also ==
- List of submissions to the 98th Academy Awards for Best International Feature Film
- List of Uruguayan submissions for the Academy Award for Best International Feature Film
