= The Anonymous Queen =

- Theatrical release poster
- Spanish: La reina anónima
- Directed by: Gonzalo Suárez
- Screenplay by: Gonzalo Suárez
- Starring: Carmen Maura; Marisa Paredes; Juanjo Puigcorbé
- Cinematography: Carlos Suárez
- Edited by: Pablo del Amo
- Music by: Mario de Benito
- Production companies: Ditirambo Films; Lola Films
- Distributed by: United International Pictures
- Release dates: September 1992 (Zinemaldia); 16 October 1992 (Spain)
- Country: Spain
- Language: Spanish

The Anonymous Queen (Spanish: La reina anónima) is a 1992 Spanish fantasy drama film directed by Gonzalo Suárez starring Carmen Maura and Marisa Paredes.

== Plot ==
Upon meeting a strange woman claiming to be her neighbor, the anodine life of housewife Ana Luz takes a wild turn, experiencing a series of surrealist and crazy situations that she is unable to control, with a further set of bizarre characters breaking into her residence.

== Cast ==
- Carmen Maura as Ana Luz
- Marisa Paredes as desconocida ('stranger')
- Juanjo Puigcorbé as marido ('husband')
- Jesús Bonilla as pintor ('painter')
- Cristina Marcos as amante ('lover')
- Pepa López as amiga ('friend')
- Kiti Manver as profesora ('teacher')
- El Gran Wyoming
- Clara Sanchís
- Nancho Novo

== Production ==
The screenplay was penned by Gonzalo Suárez. Produced by Ditirambo Films and Lola Films, the film boasted a 250 million ₧ budget. Filming began on 25 May 1992. Regarding the labelling of his film, Suárez stated that he was "not interested in discussing what La reina anónima is. I usually say it is a tragedy disguised as a comedy, or a psychological drama. But in the end they are nothing more than jests".

== Release ==
The film screened in the Golden Shell competition of the 40th San Sebastián International Film Festival in September 1992. It was released theatrically in Spain on 16 October 1992.

== Reception ==
Ángel Fernández-Santos of El País assessed that despite the film boasting certain assets such as "expressionist sets", "excellent craft on the part of the cast", and "a dense and brilliant literary base", it has "little, if any, sense of ellipsis", thus damaging the whole.

== Accolades ==
Year	Award	Category	Nominee(s)	Result	Ref.
1994	7th Goya Awards	Best Costume Design	Yvonne Blake	Nominated	

== See also ==
- List of Spanish films of 1992
