= A Loose End =

2025 comedy-drama film

- Uruguayan promotional poster
- Spanish: Un cabo suelto
- Directed by: Daniel Hendler
- Written by: Daniel Hendler
- Produced by: Fabrice Preel-Cleach; Emmanuelle Latourrette
- Starring: Sergio Prina; Pilar Gamboa; Alberto Wolf; Néstor Guzzini; César Troncoso
- Cinematography: Gustavo Biazzi
- Edited by: Nicolás Goldbart
- Music by: Matías Singer; Gai Borovich
- Production companies: Cordón Films; Wanka Cine; Nephilim Producciones
- Release dates: 3 September 2025 (Venice); 17 October 2025 (Spain); 7 December 2025 (Argentina); 9 April 2026 (Uruguay)
- Running time: 95 minutes
- Countries: Uruguay; Argentina; Spain
- Language: Spanish

A Loose End (Spanish: Un cabo suelto) is a 2025 comedy thriller film written and directed by Daniel Hendler. A co-production between Uruguay, Argentina and Spain, it stars Sergio Prina, Pilar Gamboa, Alberto Wolf, Néstor Guzzini, and César Troncoso.

The film had its world premiere in the Venice Spotlight section of the 82nd Venice International Film Festival on 3 September 2025, and was theatrically released in Uruguay on 9 April 2026. It was also selected as the Uruguayan entry for the Best International Feature Film at the 99th Academy Awards.

== Synopsis ==
On the run from two colleagues, Argentinian police officer Santiago escapes across the border into Uruguay. With no money and nowhere to go, he befriends the locals and discovers an unexpected chance to reinvent himself.

== Cast ==
- Sergio Prina as Santiago Pallares
- Pilar Gamboa as Rocío
- Alberto Wolf as Américo
- Néstor Guzzini as Germán
- César Troncoso as the notary

== Production ==
The film was produced by Cordón Films (Uruguay), Wanka Cine (Argentina), and Nephilim Producciones (Spain). It was shot between April and May 2024, in Uruguayan locations including Fray Bentos, Montevideo and Mercedes. In 2024, during its development stage, the project received the WIP Latam Industry Award at the 72nd San Sebastián International Film Festival.

== Release ==
The film had its world premiere at the 82nd edition of the Venice Film Festival, in the Venice Spotlight sidebar. It was later screened at the 73rd San Sebastián International Film Festival, in the Horizontes Latinos section, and at the 49th Gothenburg Film Festival.

It was commercially released on October 17, 2025, in Spanish theaters, on December 4 in Argentine theaters, and on April 9, 2026, in Uruguayan theaters.

== Reception ==
Clarin's film critic Pablo O. Scholz lauded the film, describing it as "a great film", "not for its pretensions, but for what it achieves in the audience". Lee Marshall from Screen International also praised it, writing "there's universal pleasure to be had in the film's inventive vision of a fugitive who turns the dangerous frontier into a place in which to unburden, change and grow.". Jack Walters from Next Best Picture gave a mixed review, praising its "atmospheric visuals and lighthearted tone", but also noting the romantic side of the script was "underwhelming and underwritten" and describing the first part of the film as "slow".

== See also ==
- List of submissions to the 99th Academy Awards for Best International Feature Film
- List of Uruguayan submissions for the Academy Award for Best International Feature Film
