= Elián Stolarsky =

Uruguayan visual artist, animator, and painter (b. 1990)

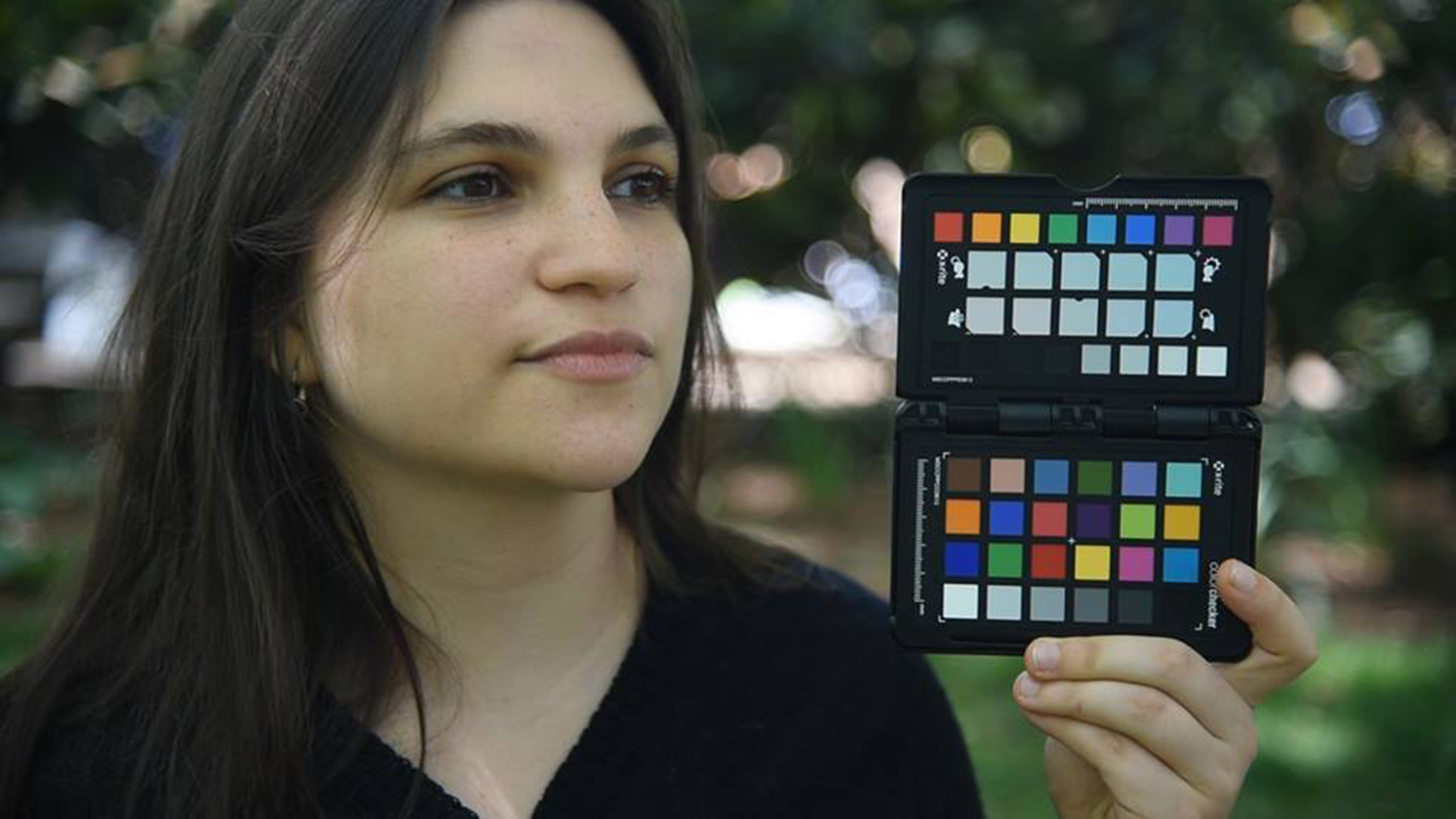
- Elián Stolarsky, 2017
- Born: Elián Stolarsky Cynowicz; December 11, 1990 (age 35); Montevideo, Uruguay
- Occupations: painter, animator, artist

Elián Stolarsky Cynowicz (born December 11, 1990) is a Uruguayan visual artist and illustrator who received from the Instituto Escuela Nacional de Bellas Artes in 2015.

== Biography ==
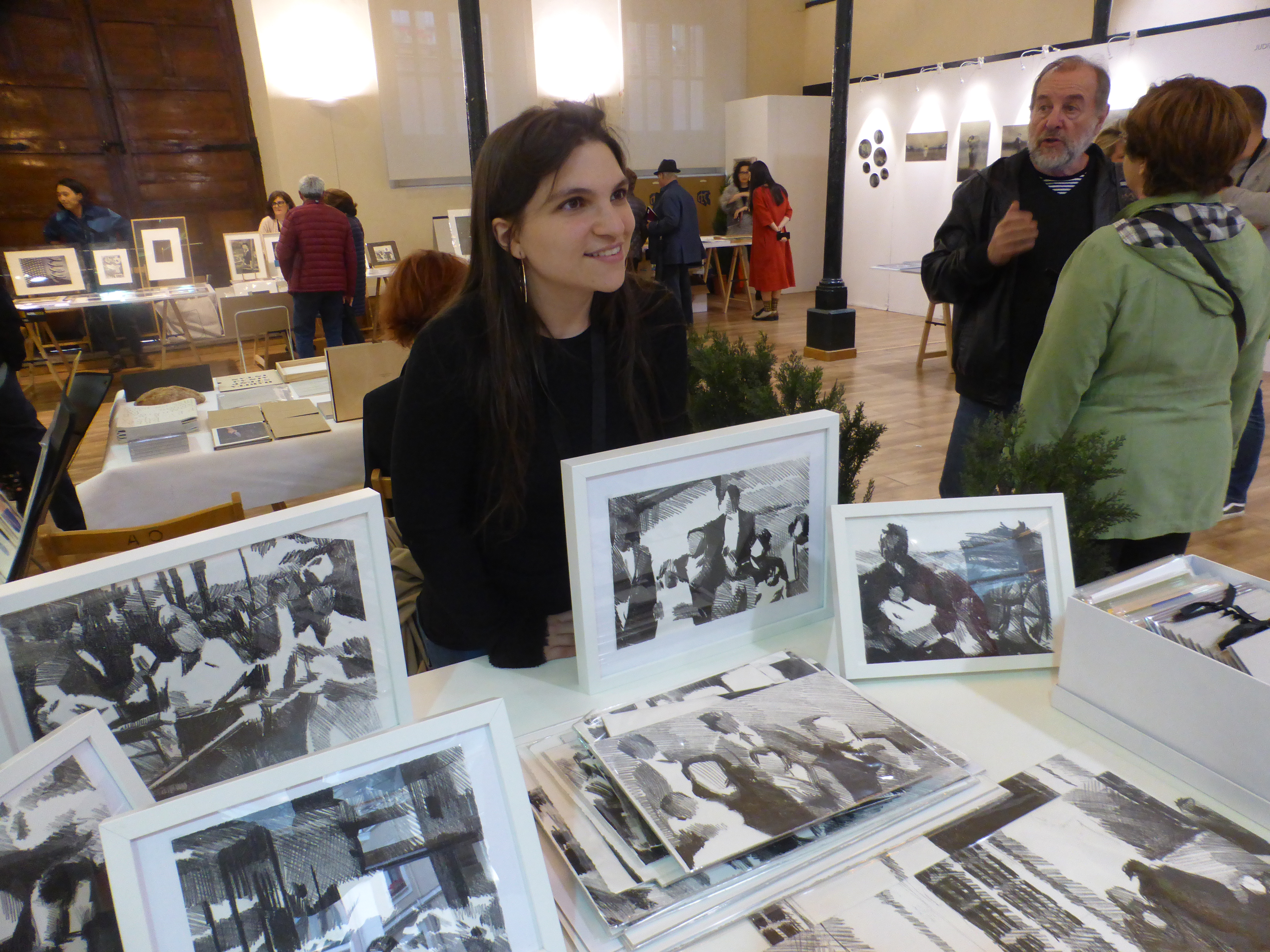
Elián Stolarsky at the Alma Gráfica 2019 fair in Oviedo, Spain.

Elián Stolarsky was born on December 11, 1990, in the city of Montevideo. She grew up there with her parents and grandparents, who were Jewish immigrants from Poland. One of her grandmothers was Sephardic Turkish. They would influence her future work in the future that explores the origins of her family, as well as the cultural and historical influxes that have led to the social environment that exists today.

Stolarsky studied with different teachers such as Fermín Hontou, Tunda Prada, Mayerling Wolf, Rimer Cardillo, Claudia Anselmi, Edgardo Flores, and Carlos Musso, among others.

At the age of 19, she held her first individual exhibition at the La Spezia Cultural Space.

In 2016, she obtained a master's degree with great distinction in "Installation and graphic techniques" at the KASK Conservatorium Institute, in Ghent, Belgium.

In 2018, at 27 years of age, she became the youngest artist to hold an individual exhibition at the National Museum of Visual Arts, in Montevideo, Uruguay.
