= The Employer and the Employee =

El empleado y el patrón
- Promotional release poster
- Directed by: Manolo Nieto
- Written by: Manolo Nieto
- Starring: Nahuel Pérez Biscayart; Justina Bustos; Cristian Borges; Fátima Quintanilla; Jean Pierre Noher
- Cinematography: Arauco Hernández Holz
- Edited by: Pablo Riera
- Music by: Holocausto Vegetal & Buenos Muchachos
- Production companies: Roken Films; Nadador Cine; Pasto Cine; Murillo Cine; Vulcana Cinema; Sancho&Punta; Paraíso Production
- Distributed by: Latido Films
- Release dates: July 9, 2021 (Cannes); January 13, 2022 (Argentina)
- Running time: 106 minutes
- Countries: Uruguay; Argentina; Brazil; France
- Languages: Spanish; Portuguese; French

The Employer and the Employee (Spanish: El empleado y el patrón) is a 2021 drama film written and directed by Manolo Nieto. It tells the story of a young man to whom his father entrusts the administration of his lands and must take on the obligation of hiring a new staff to make the ranch work properly, where an unexpected and irreparable event will happen. It stars Nahuel Pérez Biscayart, Justina Bustos, Cristian Borges, Fátima Quintanilla and Jean Pierre Noher. It was selected as the Uruguayan entry in the Best International Film at the 95th Academy Awards.

The film had its world premiere on July 9, 2021, at the Cannes Film Festival and then had a limited release in theaters in Argentina on January 13, 2022, under the distribution of Latido Films.

== Synopsis ==
Rodrigo (Nahuel Pérez Biscayart), is a young man who is married to Federica (Justina Bustos), with whom he has a very young son who apparently had a neurological problem from birth, for which they decide to do medical tests. Meanwhile, Rodrigo will face another complication: his father (Jean Pierre Noher) asks him to take charge of the ranch, which suffered the loss of two tractor drivers and must go out in search of new employees. This is how he decides to go to the house of a former worker of his father, in a border area between Uruguay and Brazil, but he rejects him due to his age and health problems. However, he suggests that he hire his 18-year-old son Carlos (Cristian Borges). In this way, both begin a friendly relationship that defies all social differences, until one day at work an unprecedented tragedy occurs that puts the friendship and relationships between the families in tension.

== Cast ==
- Nahuel Pérez Biscayart as Rodrigo
- Cristian Borges as Carlos
- Justina Bustos as Federica
- Fatima Quintanilla as Estefanie
- Jean Pierre Noher as Rodrigo's Dad
- Carlos Lacuesta as Lacuesta
- Roberto Olivera as Sampaio

== Reception ==
The film received positive reviews from the press. Diego Batlle of Other cinemas described the film as "disturbing and provocative", which "is becoming rarefied and complex, but without ever losing tension or interest". For her part, Paula Vázquez Prieto from Página 12 highlighted that the film "raises Latin American inequalities without convention and appealing to the contrasts and ambiguities of all those involved in the social game". In a review for the newspaper La Nación, Pablo De Vita wrote that the director "handles the visual resources of a story with great solvency, [...] which he impresses on his remarkable handling of the camera and the portrait he achieves of that environment as flat on the horizon as in human ties" and highlighted Pérez Biscayart's performance, saying "that he masterfully composes his role".

On the other hand, Juan Pablo Russo of Escribiendo cine rated the film a 9, stating that "it is a suggestive film [...], it escapes the moral tale and works more as a reflection of two opposite universes." Samantha Schuster of the website Cinéfilo serial rescued that the film «turns out to be a mix between a drama and a very solid thriller, which thanks to the surprising and shocking twists, the performances of the cast that offers us characters full of nuances [...] It takes us on an intense and satisfying journey.”

== See also ==
- List of submissions to the 95th Academy Awards for Best International Feature Film
- List of Uruguayan submissions for the Academy Award for Best International Feature Film
