= The Moneychanger =

2019 film

- Film poster
- Spanish: Así habló el cambista
- Directed by: Federico Veiroj
- Starring: Dolores Fonzi
- Release date: 8 September 2019 (TIFF)
- Running time: 97 minutes
- Countries: Uruguay; Argentina; Germany
- Language: Spanish

The Moneychanger (Spanish: Así habló el cambista, lit. 'Thus spoke the moneychanger') is a 2019 comedy film directed by Federico Veiroj. It was selected as the Uruguayan entry for the Best International Feature Film at the 92nd Academy Awards, but it was not nominated. As of October 2021, 60% of the 20 critical reviews compiled by Rotten Tomatoes are positive, with an average score of 6.8/10. It is a co-production between Uruguay, Argentina and Germany.

== Plot ==
In the 1970s, ambitious Humberto Brause agrees to a dubious money laundering scheme.

== Cast ==
- Dolores Fonzi as Gudrun
- Benjamín Vicuña as Javier Bonpland
- Daniel Hendler as Humberto Brause
- Germán de Silva as Moacyr
- Eugenia "China" Suárez as Graciela
- Marcos Valls as Waldemar

== See also ==
- List of submissions to the 92nd Academy Awards for Best International Feature Film
- List of Uruguayan submissions for the Academy Award for Best International Feature Film
