= Another Story of the World =

2017 film

- Film poster
- Directed by: Guillermo Casanova
- Written by: Kiro Russo
- Starring: Alfonsina Carrocio
- Cinematography: Gustavo Hadba
- Edited by: Guillermo Casanova; Pablo Riera
- Music by: Hugo Fattoruso; Daniel Yafalián
- Release date: 20 July 2017
- Running time: 105 minutes
- Country: Uruguay
- Language: Spanish
- Box office: $19,334

Another Story of the World (Spanish: Otra historia del mundo) is a 2017 Uruguayan comedy film directed by Guillermo Casanova. It was selected as the Uruguayan entry for the Best Foreign Language Film at the 90th Academy Awards, but it was not nominated.

== Plot ==
In a small town controlled by an eccentric colonel and nosy mailman, two men attempt to turn the tables.

== Cast ==
- Alfonsina Carrocio as Anita Striga
- Susana Castro as Vecina
- Nicolás Condito as Dan Valerio
- Cecilia Cósero as Amelia Valerio
- Christian Font as Locutor
- Jenny Goldstein as Rina Keffler
- Néstor Guzzini Colonel Werner Valerio

== See also ==
- List of submissions to the 90th Academy Awards for Best Foreign Language Film
- List of Uruguayan submissions for the Academy Award for Best Foreign Language Film
