= Belle Époque (film) =

1992 film by Fernando Trueba

- Theatrical release poster
- Directed by: Fernando Trueba
- Screenplay by: Rafael Azcona
- Story by: Rafael Azcona; José Luis García Sánchez; Fernando Trueba
- Produced by: Andrés Vicente Gómez
- Starring: Jorge Sanz; Penélope Cruz; Fernando Fernán Gómez; Miriam Díaz Aroca; Ariadna Gil; Maribel Verdú
- Cinematography: José Luis Alcaine
- Edited by: Carmen Frías
- Music by: Antoine Duhamel
- Production companies: Fernando Trueba PC; Lola Films; Animatógrafo; French Production
- Distributed by: United International Pictures
- Release date: 4 December 1992 (Spain)
- Running time: 109 minutes
- Countries: Spain; France; Portugal
- Language: Spanish
- Box office: $11 million

Belle Époque (Note: The plot is not set in the period of French history known as the Belle Époque ('The Beautiful Era'), but during the dawn of the Second Spanish Republic.) is a 1992 comedy-drama film directed by Fernando Trueba. Consisting of a fable-like story, primarily displaying a warm tone, and set in an idyllic countryside location during the transition to the Second Spanish Republic, the film features Jorge Sanz, Maribel Verdú, Ariadna Gil, Penélope Cruz, Miriam Díaz Aroca, Fernando Fernán Gómez, Gabino Diego and Chus Lampreave, among others.

It received the Goya Award for Best Film along with eight other Goya Awards and was named Best Foreign Language Film at the 66th Academy Awards. It is a joint production among companies from Spain, Portugal and France.

== Plot ==
In February 1931, some weeks after the failed Jaca uprising and the likewise failed Cuatro Vientos uprising, Spain is on the verge of the proclamation of the Second Republic. Fernando, a deserting private with Republican leanings and former seminarist, is on the run from his assignment at the Cuatro Vientos base. After escaping from two Guardia Civil officers, he reaches the outskirts of a village, befriending Manolo, an old man with a semblance of a "Dickensian observer of life". Manolo owns a large house in the countryside, where Fernando stays for a while.

Upon the arrival of Manolo's four daughters in a train, Fernando is enchanted by them all. As he meets each of the first three one by one, he falls in love and has sex with each of them, determining to marry. With each one, however, a complication arises: Clara, a widow who only recently lost her husband and who seeks solace with Fernando; Violeta, a closeted lesbian who showed attraction for Fernando only when she saw him dressed as a woman for a costume ball, and the day after tells him that it was insignificant; and Rocío, a social climber who is about to marry Juanito and into the village's richest family (with Carlist leanings) for the security it would provide, and who only momentarily succumbs to Fernando's charms.

Heartbroken each time, the father of the girls encourages Fernando to have patience. Each daughter is beautiful and represents a different aspect of feminine sexuality. The youngest of the family, Luz, represents naïveté. While Fernando is pursuing her sisters, Luz gets progressively angry and jealous. Eventually, Fernando realizes, however, that Luz is the best one of the four to marry.

== Cast ==
- Jorge Sanz as Fernando
- Fernando Fernán-Gómez as Manolo
- Maribel Verdú as Rocío
- Ariadna Gil as Violeta
- Penélope Cruz as Luz
- Miriam Díaz Aroca as Clara
- Gabino Diego as Juanito
- Agustín González as Don Luis
- Chus Lampreave as Doña Asun
- Mary Carmen Ramírez as Amalia
- Michel Galabru as Danglard
- Jesús Bonilla as Guardia Civil
- Juan José Otegui as El cabo
- María Galiana as La Polonia
- Joan Potau as El alguacil
- Manolo Huete as Un lugareño
- José Antonio Sacristán as Rorro
- Marciano de la Fuente as El alcalde
- Félix Cubero as Palomo

== Production ==
The film project originated in 1990 at a Madrid restaurant where Fernando Trueba, Rafael Azcona, and José Luis García Sánchez frequently met to discuss cinematic projects. The story contains autobiographical elements for Trueba, as the director’s real-life father-in-law is named Manolo—just like the father-in-law of the protagonist, who shares the director's first name, Fernando.

Before writing the screenplay, Trueba wanted to show Azcona and García Sánchez Jean Renoir’s Partie de campagne to illustrate the tone he envisioned for the film. From that movie—as well as from Jean Renoir’s The Rules of the Game—he drew the concept of main characters fleeing the city in search of a bucolic setting where primal instincts could surface.

Trueba wanted the story set at the beginning of the Second Spanish Republic, a period that represented a fleeting moment of hope and the promise of paradise—a promise that soon vanished. He explained that he never intended the film to serve as a parable of that historical era, nor did he want the setting to evoke any specific region of Spain.

A Spanish-Portuguese-French co-production, Belle Époque was produced by Fernando Trueba PC, Lola Films, Animatógrafo, and French Production with the collaboration of Sogepaq and Eurimages. The film was shot between July 5 and August 26, 1992 in several villages of Portugal. Trueba chose to shoot there because it was cheaper than filming in Spain (Trueba had a budget of only 160 million pesetas) and because the country had undergone fewer changes between that era and the present day. The house and village are located in Arruda dos Vinhos, the train station in Ríos, the church in Sobral de Monte Agraço, and the river in Azambuja.

The soundtrack was conducted by Antoine Duhamel and performed by the Madrid Philharmonic Orchestra at Kirios Studios in Madrid in November 1992, while the songs were performed by Mary Carmen Ramírez.

== Release and reception ==
=== Box office ===
In Spain, it was the highest-grossing Spanish film of 1992 with a gross of over 725 million Spanish pesetas ($5.58 million). In the United States and Canada it grossed $6 million for a worldwide gross more than $11 million. The film was theatrically released in Spain on 4 December 1992.

=== Critical response ===
The film was positively received in multiple countries.

Contemporary critics have also spoken very positively of the film, with Yago García of Cinemanía writing that it "captured, like no other, the atmosphere of freedom that accompanied the proclamation of the new regime." On review aggregator Rotten Tomatoes, the film holds an approval rating of 95% based on 22 reviews. The film is mentioned in the 2010 American film The Fighter.

=== Year-end lists ===
- Top 10 (listed alphabetically, not ranked) – Mike Mayo, The Roanoke Times
- Honorable mentions – Mike Clark, USA Today

=== Accolades ===
Year	Award	Category	Nominee(s)	Result	Ref.
1993	43rd Berlin International Film Festival	Golden Bear		Nominated	
1993	7th Goya Awards	Best Film		Won	
1993	7th Goya Awards	Best Director	Fernando Trueba	Won	
1993	7th Goya Awards	Best Original Screenplay	Fernando Trueba José Luis García Sánchez, Rafael Azcona	Won	
1993	7th Goya Awards	Best Actress	Ariadna Gil	Won	
1993	7th Goya Awards	Best Actor	Jorge Sanz	Nominated	
1993	7th Goya Awards	Best Supporting Actress	Chus Lampreave	Won	
1993	7th Goya Awards	Best Supporting Actress	Mary Carmen Ramírez	Nominated	
1993	7th Goya Awards	Best Supporting Actor	Fernando Fernán-Gómez	Won	
1993	7th Goya Awards	Best Supporting Actor	Gabino Diego	Nominated	
1993	7th Goya Awards	Best Cinematography	José Luis Alcaine	Won	
1993	7th Goya Awards	Best Editing	Carmen Frías	Won	
1993	7th Goya Awards	Best Art Direction	Juan Botella	Won	
1993	7th Goya Awards	Best Production Supervision	Cristina Huete	Nominated	
1993	7th Goya Awards	Best Costume Design	Lala Huete	Nominated	
1993	7th Goya Awards	Best Makeup and Hairstyles	Ana Ferreira, Ana Lorena	Nominated	
1993	7th Goya Awards	Best Original Score	Antoine Duhamel	Nominated	
1993	7th Goya Awards	Best Sound	Alfonso Pino, Georges Prat	Nominated	
1994	66th Academy Awards	Best Foreign Language Film		Won	
1995	48th British Academy Film Awards	BAFTA Award for Best Film Not in the English Language		Nominated	

== See also ==
- List of Spanish films of 1992
- List of submissions to the 66th Academy Awards for Best Foreign Language Film
- List of Spanish submissions for the Academy Award for Best Foreign Language Film
