= Néstor Guzzini =

Uruguayan actor (born 1973)

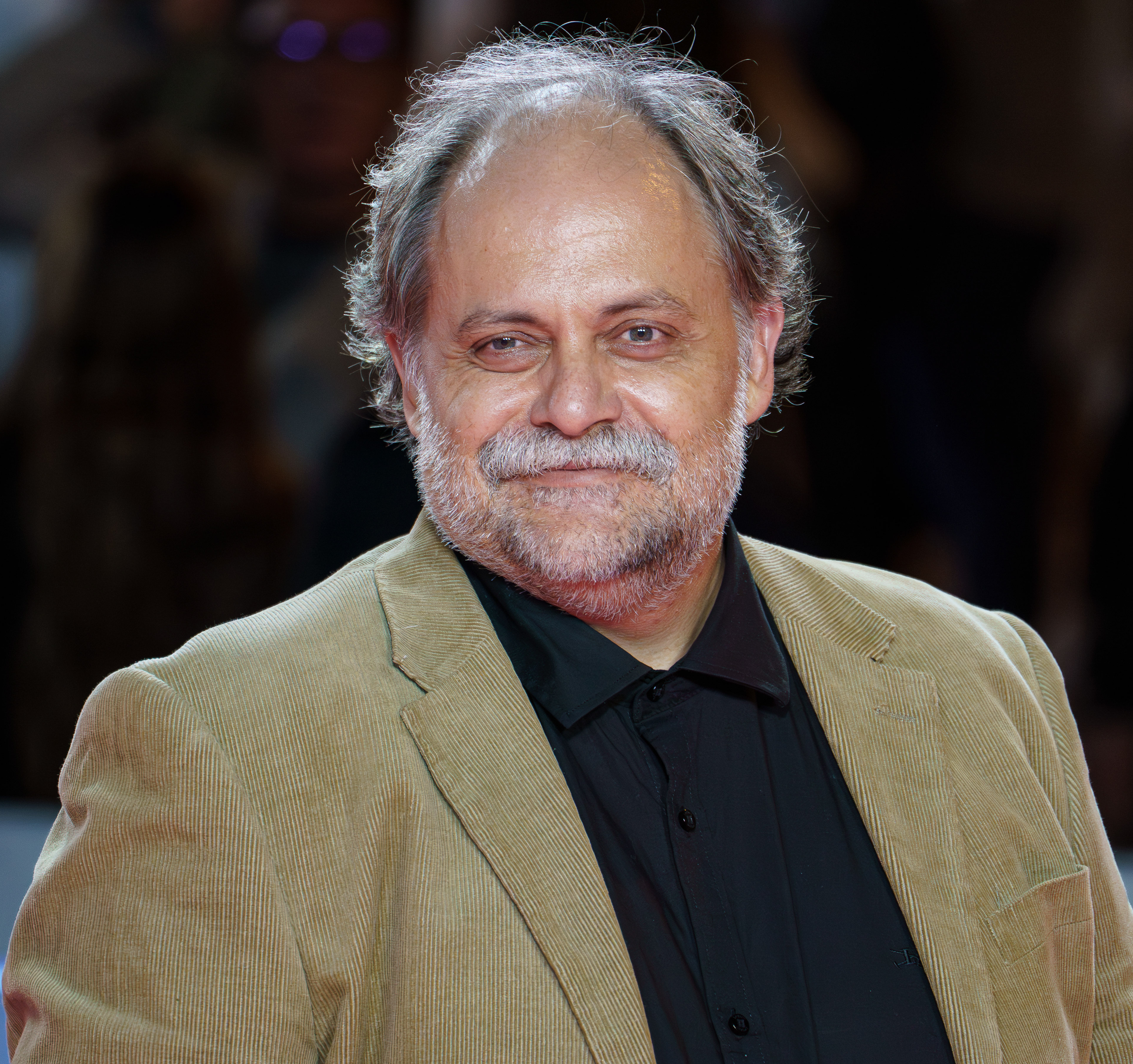
- Guzzini at the Málaga Film Festival in 2025
- Born: Néstor Gabriel Guzzini Massafferro; January 25, 1973 (age 53); Montevideo, Uruguay
- Occupations: Actor; carnival performer
- Years active: 2004–present
- Children: 1

Néstor Gabriel Guzzini Massafferro (born January 25, 1973) is a Uruguayan actor and carnival performer. With a prolific career in cinema, he is mainly known for his roles in the films Mr. Kaplan (2014), Zanahoria (2014), Another Story of the World (2017) and Alelí (2019).

== Early life ==
Néstor Gabriel Guzzini Massafferro was born on January 25, 1973 in Montevideo, the son of Walter Guzzini and Ana María Massafferro. He has two sisters, Mariela and Andrea. He is of Italian descent; his grandfather Fernando, a World War I veteran, emigrated to Uruguay from the commune of Recanati in the Marche region.

He grew up in the Buceo neighborhood and attended public schools.

== Personal life ==
In 2006, he married María Noel Gahete, with whom he has a son, Leandro.

== Filmography ==
=== Film ===
Year	Title	Role	Notes
2005	Ocho horas		Short film
2008	Acne	Andy's father	
2008	Total disponibilidad	King of Sales	
2009	Giant	Tomás	
2012	The Delay	Watchman	
2012	3	Dustin	
2013	Tanta agua	Alberto	
2014	Mr. Kaplan	Wilson Contreras	
2014	Zanahoria	Osvaldo	
2015	The Midfielder	Hugo Donato	
2015	La duna	Mayor	Short film
2015	Clever	Walter	
2017	Another Story of the World	Col. Werner Valerio	
2017	Mi mundial	Rúben Torres	
2019	Alelí	Ernesto Mazzotti	
2019	The Last Romantics	El Gordo	
2023	El método Tangalanga	Alan Sabbagh	
2024	Ainda Somos os Mesmos	Argentine Ambassador	
2025	Dogs		
2025	Quemadura china	Dani	
2025	A Loose End	Germán	

=== Television ===
Year	Title	Role	Notes
2012	REC	Tato	Main role
2015	Parentela	Giacomo Parentela	Main role
2015	The Hypnotist	Mario	Recurring role
2017	El mundo de los videos	Héctor	Supporting role
2018	Everyone behind Momo	Néstor Maidana	Main role
2021	The Kingdom	Sheriff Lamas	Recurring role
2022	Porn and Ice Cream	Pereyra	Recurring role

=== Theatre ===
Year	Title	Role	Playwright	Venue	Ref.
2022	Recuerdos de Niza	Lucien	Jorge Esmoris and Federico Silva	Sala Zitarrosa, Montevideo	
2025	Plantar bandera	Niño	Federico Silva	Sala Jorge Lazaroff, Montevideo	
