= Petru Valensky =

Uruguayan actor, comedian and television presenter

- Born: Fernando Gabriel Enciso Balparda; 8 August 1958 (age 67); Montevideo, Uruguay
- Occupations: Actor, comedian, television presenter

Fernando Gabriel Enciso Balparda, better known for his stage name Petru Valensky (born 8 August 1958 in Montevideo) is a Uruguayan actor, comedian and television presenter.

== Career ==
Valensky is a self-taught scenic artist. The breakthrough of his career was Quién le teme a Italia Fausta, according to a Brazilian original by Miguel Magno and Ricardo de Almeida; under the direction of Omar Varela, this theatre masterpiece remained from 1988 until 2003 at Teatro del Anglo. Valensky has remained one of the best-known popular actors in Uruguay ever since.

He has taken part in over 50 theatre pieces (including the role of Mamá Cora in Waiting for the Hearse in 2022) and also on several television programmes (including Decalegrón). Valensky's female impersonations are the hallmark of his career. Perhaps the best-known over the years is his television alter-ego as Doris, the handmaid.

Valensky's voice can be heard in one of the best Uruguayan animated films, Anina (2013).
