= Eduardo Campoy =

Spanish film producer (born 1955)

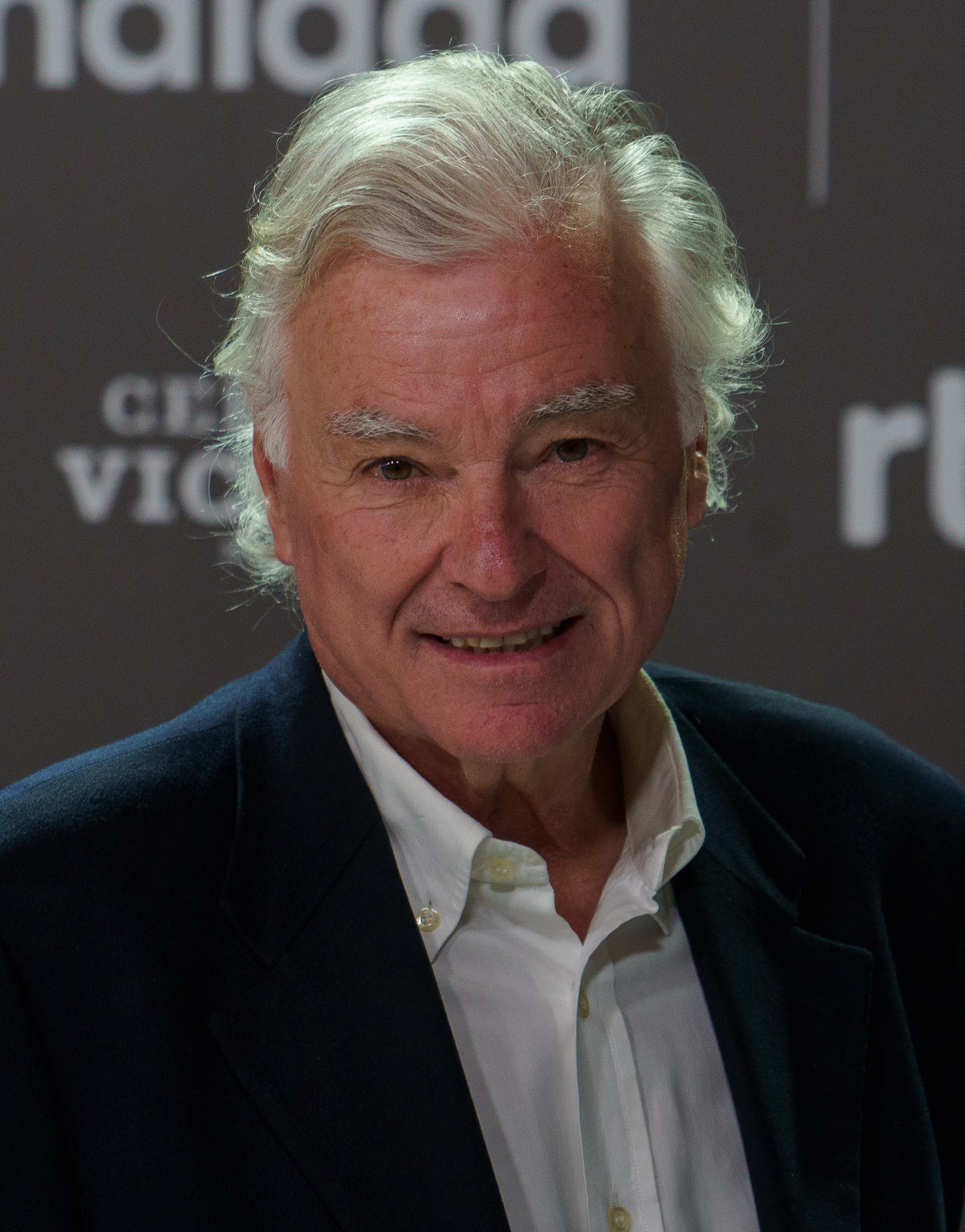
- Campoy in 2025
- Born: Eduardo Campoy Sanz-Orrio; 21 September 1955 (age 71); León, Spain
- Occupations: Film producer; film director
- Spouse: Mabel Lozano (m. 1998)

Eduardo Campoy Sanz-Orrio (born 21 September 1955) is a Spanish film producer. He has also worked as director.

== Life and career ==
Eduardo Campoy Sanz-Orrio was born in León on 21 September 1955. He co-helmed Copia cero in 1981 in his directorial debut feature, but he eventually leaned towards a career as producer in the film industry, founding Cartel ('Creativos Asociados de Radio y Televisión S.A.') in 1987. It was followed by Too Much Heart (1992) and Al límite (1997). He has produced over 70 films, including Just Walking, The Girl of Your Dreams and The Tit and the Moon, Un franco, 14 pesetas, as well as Álamo Producciones Audiovisuales productions such as The Best Summer of My Life, and The Wedding Unplanner.

In 1998, he married Mabel Lozano. He served as president of the Federation of Associations of Audiovisual Producers of Spain (FAPAE) from 1999 to 2003.

In 2009, Campoy was appointed as acting president of the Academy of Cinematographic Arts and Sciences of Spain.
