= Claudia Anselmi =

- Born: Claudia Anselmi; September 29, 1958; Montevideo, Uruguay
- Education: Centro de Expresión Artística (CEA); Club de Grabado de Montevideo
- Known for: Engraving, printmaking, installation, drawing, painting
- Notable work: Los juegos en el bosque – que el viento hable; Uróboros
- Website: https://www.claudiaanselmi.com

Claudia Anselmi (born 29 September 1958) is a Uruguayan visual artist whose work includes drawing, painting, engraving, installation, and monoprint. She lives and works in Montevideo, Uruguay, and has exhibited widely in Uruguay and internationally. Her practice is closely associated with graphic arts and experimental printmaking techniques.

== Biography and education ==
Claudia Anselmi was born on 29 September 1958 in Montevideo, Uruguay.

She studied visual arts at the Centro de Expresión Artística (CEA) under Nelson Ramos, and later specialized in engraving at the Club de Grabado de Montevideo with Héctor Contte. In 1986, she completed postgraduate training in engraving with David Finkbeiner.

== Career ==
Anselmi has been active as an artist since the early 1970s and has participated in numerous solo and collective exhibitions in Uruguay and abroad. Her work frequently explores organic forms, cycles, and processes of transformation, often through serial production and material experimentation.

In 1992, she co-founded Taller Cebollatí together with Teresa Gilly, establishing a workshop dedicated to teaching and artistic production in graphic arts. In 2007, Taller Cebollatí received Second Prize for Best Artistic Teaching Institution from Fundación Itaú.

Her work has been exhibited at major Uruguayan institutions, including the Museo Nacional de Artes Visuales (MNAV), as well as at international venues such as the Jincheon Print Museum in South Korea.

== Major exhibitions ==
In 2016, Anselmi presented Los juegos en el bosque – que el viento hable at the Museo Nacional de Artes Visuales, accompanied by a published exhibition catalogue issued by the museum.

In 2022, the Museo Juan Manuel Blanes hosted Uróboros, an exhibition that offered a retrospective reading of her work and emphasized continuity, recurrence, and transformation as central themes in her artistic practice.

== Teaching and cultural activity ==
Alongside her artistic production, Anselmi has been active as an educator and cultural promoter. She has taught engraving and visual arts through Taller Cebollatí and has participated in international artistic and teaching exchange programs, including activities in the United States. She has also served on juries and advisory commissions related to visual arts in Uruguay.
