= In This Tricky Life =

2001 Uruguayan film directed by Beatriz Flores Silva

- Film poster
- Spanish: En la puta vida
- Directed by: Beatriz Flores Silva
- Screenplay by: Beatriz Flores Silva; János Kovácsi
- Produced by: Beatriz Flores Silva; Hubert Toint; Stefan Schmitz
- Starring: Mariana Santángelo; Silvestre; Josep Linuesa
- Cinematography: Francisco Gozón
- Edited by: Marie-Hélène Dozo; Daniel Márquez
- Music by: Carlos Da Silveira
- Production companies: BFS Producciones; Saga Film; Avalon Productions; ICAIC
- Release date: July 4, 2001
- Running time: 103 minutes
- Countries: Uruguay; Belgium; Spain; Cuba
- Language: Spanish

In This Tricky Life (Spanish: En la puta vida) is a 2001 comedy-drama film co-written, co-produced and directed by Beatriz Flores Silva. It was Uruguay's submission to the 74th Academy Awards for the Academy Award for Best Foreign Language Film, but was not accepted as a nominee. The film was awarded the 'Golden Columbus' at the Huelva Ibero-American Film Festival. An international co-production among companies from Uruguay, Belgium, Spain and Cuba, the film was produced by BFS Producciones, Saga Film, Avalon Productions and ICAIC.

It is based on the novel El huevo de la serpiente by journalist María Urruzola, whose investigations exposed an Uruguayan sex trafficking network in 1992.

== Cast ==
- Mariana Santángelo as Elisa
- Silvestre as Plácido el Cara
- Josep Linuesa as Marcelo
- Andrea Fantoni as Lulú
- Rodrigo Speranza as Marcos
- Martha Gularte

== See also ==
- Cinema of Uruguay
- List of submissions to the 74th Academy Awards for Best Foreign Language Film
- List of Uruguayan submissions for the Academy Award for Best International Feature Film
