= Zanahoria =

2014 Uruguayan-Argentine thriller film

- Theatrical release poster
- Directed by: Enrique Buchichio
- Screenplay by: Enrique Buchichio
- Based on: Newspaper report by Jorge Lauro and Alfredo García
- Produced by: Natacha López; Guillermo Casanova; Hugo Castro Fau; Carolina Álvarez
- Starring: César Troncoso; Martín Rodríguez; Abel Tripaldi
- Cinematography: Pablo Parra
- Edited by: Guillermo Casanova
- Music by: Mario Buchichio
- Production companies: Lavorágine Films, Lagarto Cine
- Release date: 2014
- Running time: 100 minutes
- Countries: Uruguay, Argentina
- Language: Spanish

Zanahoria (alternatively titled Detrás de la verdad) is a 2014 Uruguayan-Argentine thriller drama film written and directed by Enrique Buchichio.

== Plot ==
The story is based on events that occurred in Uruguay prior to the national elections of 2004. Two journalists are contacted by an informant who offers them evidence of crimes that took place during the Uruguayan dictatorship of 1973–1985 under the so-called Operación Zanahoria ("Operation Carrot").

== Production ==
The film was produced by Natacha López and Guillermo Casanova, of Lavorágine Films, and by Hugo Castro Fau and Carolina Álvarez of Lagarto Cine.

== Cast ==
- César Troncoso (Walter)
- Martín Rodríguez (Jorge)
- Abel Tripaldi (Alfredo)
- Néstor Guzzini (Osvaldo)
- Mónica Navarro (Silvina)
- Victoria Césperes (Vicky)
- Carlos Vallarino (Mario)
- Ana Rosa (Clara)
- Martín Pavlovsky (Eduardo)

== Awards ==
- 2014: Colón de Oro, Festival de Huelva
- 2014: Montevideo Audiovisual Member of the Departmental Intendancy of Montevideo: Finalización
- 2013: Promotional Fund Prize from the Institute of Cinema and the Audiovisual of Uruguay
- 2013: INCAA Prize, Argentina
- 2013: Montevideo Audiovisual Member of the Departmental Intendancy of Montevideo: Filma
- 2011: FONA Prize (Uruguay)
