= A Useful Life =

2010 film

- The Spanish language cinema poster
- Directed by: Federico Veiroj
- Written by: Federico Veiroj; Gonzalo Delgado; Inés Bortagaray; Arauco Hernández Holz
- Produced by: Federico Veiroj
- Starring: Jorge Jellinek
- Cinematography: Arauco Hernández Holz
- Edited by: Federico Veiroj; Arauco Hernández Holz
- Music by: Leo Masliah & Macunaíma; Eduardo Fabini
- Production companies: Cinekdoque; Mediapro; Versátil Cinema
- Release date: 13 August 2010 (Uruguay)
- Running time: 67 minutes
- Countries: Uruguay; Spain
- Language: Spanish

A Useful Life (Spanish: La vida útil) is a 2010 Uruguayan drama film co-written, co-produced and directed by Federico Veiroj. It was shot in black-and-white. The film was selected as the Uruguayan entry for the Best Foreign Language Film at the 83rd Academy Awards but it did not make the final shortlist.

== Plot ==
Set in Montevideo's legendary Cinemateca Uruguaya, it is the story about the closure of a cinematheque with the same name due to financial difficulties, and how it affects its film loving middle manager Jorge (played by film critic-turned-actor Jorge Jellinek), who has worked there for 25 years. At first he is overwhelmed by the prospect of having no profession or purpose, and drifts around in Montevideo. But eventually he realises that nothing can kill his love for film, so he ends the day by taking his love interest to the cinema.

Although the story is fiction, Cinemateca Uruguaya, which celebrated 50 years in 2012, is besieged by financial problems, and its director Manuel Martínez Carril agreed to play himself in the film.

== Cast ==
- Jorge Jellinek as Jorge
- Manuel Martinez Carril as Martínez
- Paola Venditto as Paola

== Awards ==
- Istanbul Film Festival - Special Jury Prize ex-aequo
- Havana Film Festival/New Latin American Cinema of La Havana - Coral Grand Prize, Best Film
- Warsaw International Film Festival - Special Mention

== See also ==
- List of submissions to the 83rd Academy Awards for Best Foreign Language Film
- List of Uruguayan submissions for the Academy Award for Best Foreign Language Film
