= Santa Rosa de Conlara =

Coordinates: 32°20′34″S 65°12′32″W

- Municipality and village
- Interactive map of Santa Rosa de Conlara
- Country: Argentina
- Province: San Luis Province
- Time zone: UTC−3 (ART)

Santa Rosa de Conlara is a village and municipality in San Luis Province in central Argentina.
