= Beatriz Flores Silva =

Uruguayan-Belgian film director and producer

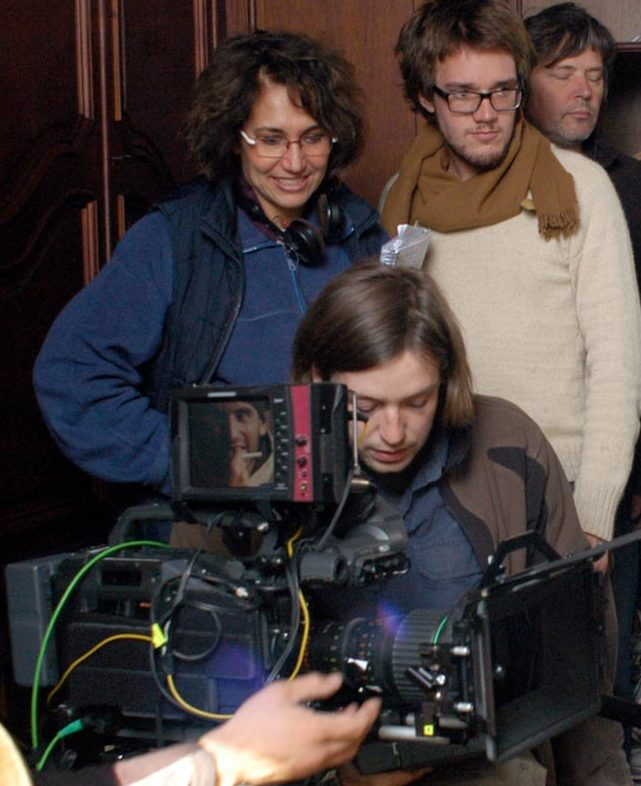
- Photo of film crew working in Masangeles, 2013
- Born: Beatriz Flores Silva; November 7, 1956 (age 69); Montevideo, Uruguay
- Occupations: Film director, film producer, screenwriter, television director
- Notable work: In This Tricky Life

Beatriz Flores Silva (born November 7, 1956) is an Uruguayan-Belgian film director, film producer, screenwriter and teacher. Her films include The Seven Deadly Sins (1990), The Almost True Story of Pepita the Gunslinger (1992), In This Tricky Life (2001), and Masangeles (2008).

== Filmography ==
Flores Silva is daughter of politician and intellectual Manuel Flores Mora.

After directing two short films she participated in the collective feature film The Seven Deadly Sins (Les sept péchés capitaux) as co-director, screenwriter and producer. In 1992 she directed the film The Almost True Story of Pepita the Gunslinger (original Spanish title: La historia casi verdadera de Pepita la Pistolera), which set a standard in Uruguayan cinema and won several awards.

Between 1998 and 2001 she wrote and directed In This Tricky Life (original Spanish title: En la puta vida, a Uruguayan/Belgian/Spanish/Cuban co-production. The movie premiered in 2001 and became the biggest box office success in the history of Uruguayan cinema. It also won several international awards.

Year	Film	Role	Notes
1990	The Seven Deadly Sins	co-director/co-writer	
1992	La historia casi verdadera de Pepita la Pistolera	Director/Writer/Producer	
2001	In This Tricky Life	Director/Writer/Producer	
2008	Masangeles	Director/Writer/Producer	

== Awards and recognition ==
International awards received by Flores Silva's movies:

Masangeles (2008):

- Special Mention of the Jury in Avanca Awards (Portugal, 2009).
- Best Actor in Avanca Awards (Portugal, 2009).
- Best Iberoamerican Film at the Rio de Janeiro Iberoamerican Film Festival (Rio de Janeiro, 2009).
- Best Director at the Rio de Janeiro Iberoamerican Film Festival (Rio de Janeiro, 2009).
- Best Screenplay at the Rio de Janeiro Iberoamerican Film Festival (Rio de Janeiro, 2009).
- Best Actress at the Rio de Janeiro Iberoamerican Film Festival (Rio de Janeiro, 2009).
- Best Supporting Actor at the Rio de Janeiro Iberoamerican Film Festival (Rio de Janeiro, 2009).
- Best Artistic Direction at the Rio de Janeiro Iberoamerican Film Festival (Rio de Janeiro, 2009).
- Best Picture at the Buenos Aires Latin American Film Festival (Buenos Aires, 2009).
- Best Original Screenplay at the Buenos Aires Latin American Film Festival (Buenos Aires, 2009).
- Directing Special Mention at the Santa Cruz Film Festival (Bolivia, 2009).
- Special Mention at the Ourense International Film Festival (Spain, 2009).
- Best Artistic Direction by the Association of Uruguayan Critics (2009).
- Best Actor by the Association of Uruguayan Critics (2009).

In This Tricky Life (2001):

- First Uruguayan submission at the Academy Awards (USA, 2002).
- Special Prize by the Jury in the Trieste Festival of Latin-American Cinema (Italy, 2001).
- Colón de Oro and Llave de la Libertad in Huelva's Iberoamerican Film Festival (Spain, 2001).
- Radio Prize La Habana-Cuba in the New Latin American Cinema of La Habana (Cuba, 2001).
- Best Film, Best Actress and Public Choice Award at the Lérida Festival (Spain, 2002).
- Special Mention by the Jury at the Miami Latin Festival (USA, 2002).
- Second award at the 18° Chicago Latin Film Festival (USA, 2002).
- Third Public Award at the Los Angeles Latino International Film Festival (USA, 2002).
- Best Actress Award at the Villaverde Festival (Spain, 2002).
- Mercosur's Trophy to the Public's Favorite Movie in Cinesul 2002 (Brazil, 2002).
- Special Mention in the Santa Cruz Film Festival (Bolivia, 2002).
- Best Actress Award at the Viña del Mar International Film Festival (Chile, 2002).
- Public's Choice Award at the Asunción Film Festival (Paraguay, 2002).
- Best Director Award at the Bogotá Film Festival, Bogocine (Colombia, 2002).
- Public's Choice Award at the Latinamerican Film Festival UCI, Irvine (USA, 2003).
- Special Prize, Best Score and Best Revelation Actress at the Association of Uruguayan Critics (Uruguay, 2001).
- Iris Award, awarded by the Sábado Show magazine (Uruguay, 2002).
- “Alas” Award by Interarte (Uruguay, 2002).

The Almost True Story of Pepita the Gunslinger (1992):

- Great Prize PAOA TV at the Viña del Mar International Film Festival (Chile, 1993).
- Best Interpretation Award at the Guadalajara's Videofil (Mexico, 1993).
- Best Video Award at the 10° Annual Chicago Latino Film Festival Runs (USA, 1994).
- Best Fiction Medium-length Film, Best Acting and Public's Choice Award at the Second Video Rosario Latinamerican Festival (Argentina, 1994).
- First Prize, Category Fiction, in the Espacio Uruguay and First Prize in the Unión Latina video in the XII International Film Festival of Uruguay (Uruguay, 1994).
