= Pastora Vega =

Spanish actress

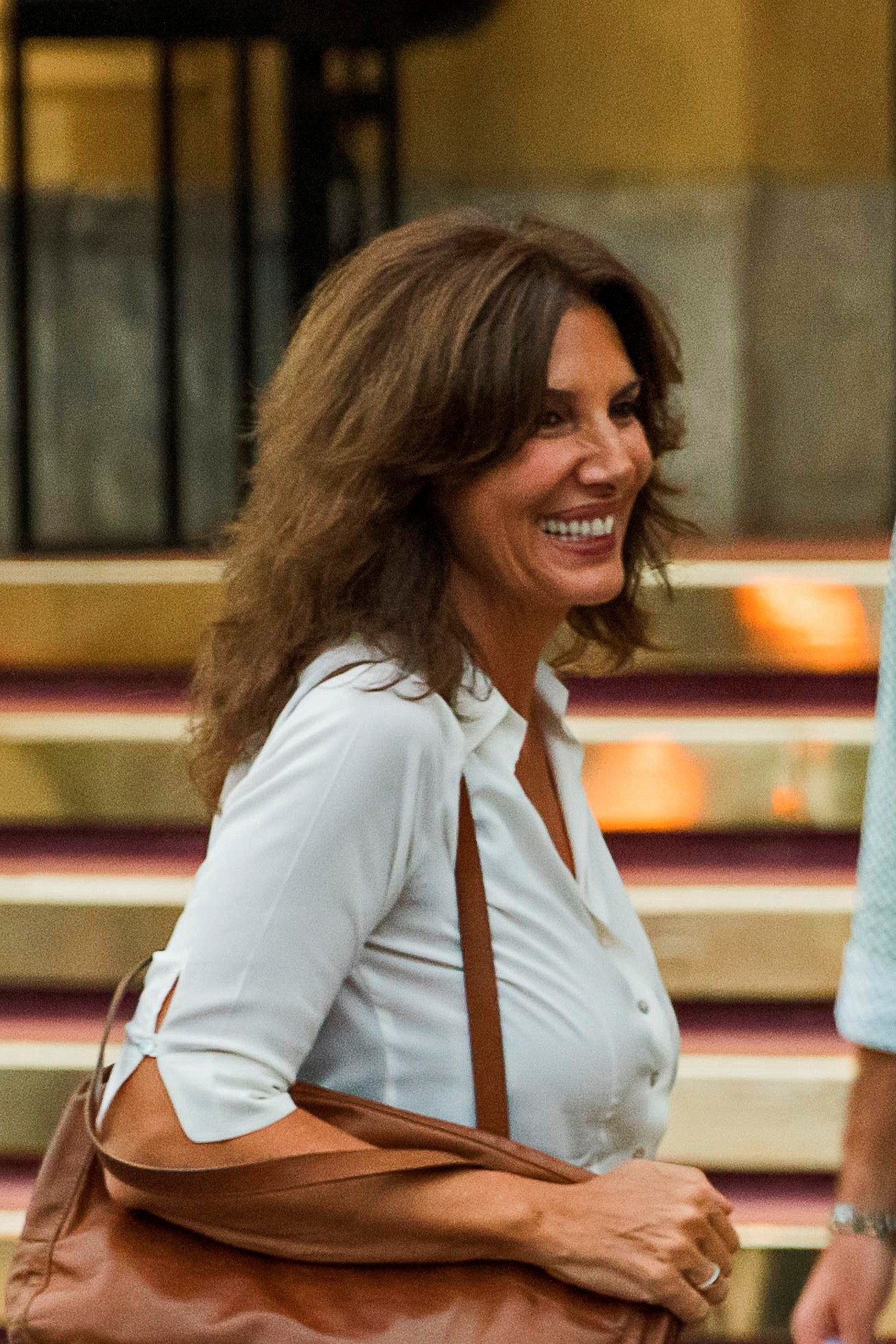
- Vega in 2018
- Born: Pastora Vega Aparicio; 28 May 1960 (age 66); Madrid, Spain
- Occupations: Actress, television host
- Years active: 1982–present
- Spouse: Imanol Arias (m. 1984; div. 2009)
- Partner(s): Juan Ribó (2010–2015); Darío Grandinetti (2016–2024)
- Children: 2

Pastora Vega Aparicio (born 28 May 1960) is a Spanish actress and television host. She appeared in more than thirty films since 1985.

She appeared in the TV series Entreolivos, by Antonio Cuadri and starring Ana Ruiz, Eduardo Velasco, María Ramos, Ángel Caballero and Jesús Carrillo.

== Biography ==
The great-granddaughter of the flamenco dancer Pastora Imperio and granddaughter of the bullfighter Rafael Vega de los Reyes Gitanillo de Triana, she holds a law degree from the Autonomous University of Madrid. Her first marriage was to Alberto Oliet Palá. She made her debut in the entertainment world alongside Ignacio Salas and Guillermo Summers, co-hosting the television program Y sin embargo, te quiero.

She made her acting debut in 1985 in the television series Los pazos de Ulloa, directed by Gonzalo Suárez (director) and starring Victoria Abril and Charo López.

She later appeared in Dawn Breaks, Which Is No Small Thing, Demasiado corazón—for which she was nominated for a Goya Award—Casas de fuego, and Ilona llega con la lluvia, among others. Her television career proved to be more successful.

In a relationship with actor Imanol Arias, she worked with him on the films El Lute II: Tomorrow I'll be Free and Todos los Hombres Sois Iguales, and starred in Un Asunto Privado, her only foray into directing. She also had a recurring role in the TVE series Cuéntame Cómo Pasó. They have two sons, Jon and Daniel, and lived together until 2009.

== Television series ==
Year	Title	Character	Notes
1985	Los pazos de Ulloa		
1989	Delirios de amor		
1989-1990	Brigada Central		
1992	Hasta luego, cocodrilo	Carmen	
1994	Hermanos de leche		
1996	Rosa, la lluita		
1999-2000	Nada es para siempre		
2001	Dime que me quieres	Eva	
2002, 2005, 2009	Cuéntame cómo pasó		
2004-2005	Madrid no duerme: ¡De cine!		
2006-2007	Amar en tiempos revueltos	Angustias Pastor Grijalbo de Domínguez	
2009	UCO	Mercedes "Merche" Pérez Ronda/Mercedes "Merche" Vázquez Rivera/Carmen/"La cara Guapa"	
2011	Bandolera	Carmen Saura	
2013	Gran Reserva: El origen	Pilar Jiménez	
2015-2016	Velvet	Carmen Alcocer vda. de Alcocer	
2016	El Ministerio del Tiempo		
2017-2018	Entreolivos		

== Movies ==
Year	Movie	Character	Director
1986	El sueño de Tánger		Ricardo Franco
1986	Iniciativa privada		Antonio A. Farré
1988	El Lute II: Tomorrow I'll be Free		Vicente Aranda
1989	Amanece, que no es poco	Labrador that sows in a man	José Luis Cuerda
1990	La otra historia de Rosendo Juárez		Gerardo Vera
1992	Demasiado corazón		Eduardo Campoy
1994	Casas de fuego	Clor	Juan Bautista Stagnaro
1994	All Men Are the Same		Manuel Gómez Pereira
1996	Ilona Arrives with the Rain		Sergio Cabrera
1996	Un Asunto Privado		Imanol Arias
1996	Olé Olá		José María Aguayo
1997	Tangier Cop		Stephen Whittaker
1998	La sonámbula		Fernando Spiner
1998	A Chrysanthemum Bursts in Cincoesquinas	La Gallega	Daniel Burman
2002	El chevrolé		Leonardo Ricagni

== Theater ==
Year	Title
1989	Así que pasen cinco años
2010	Una relación pornográfica
2015	La asamblea de mujeres

== Television programs ==
Year	Title	Channel	Notes
1982	Hoy por hoy	La 1	TV Host
1983-1984	Y sin embargo, te quiero	La 1	TV Host
1986	La tarde	La 1	TV Host
2014	¡A bailar!	Antena 3	Competitor with Juan Ribó

== Awards ==
Year	Award	Category	Program	Result
1992	Goya Award	Best Female Performance of Cast	Demasiado corazón	Nominated
2018	Victoria Woman Award			Winner
