= Mónica Molina =

Spanish actor and singer

- Born: Mónica Molina Tejedor; 24 January 1968 (age 58); Madrid, Spain

Mónica Molina Tejedor is a Spanish actress and singer with a distinctive Mediterranean style in her albums. She is the daughter of well-known singer Antonio Molina.

Her album, "Vuela", was nominated for the 2002 Latin Grammy awards.

Her albums have received a popular interest in Turkey, where she have had several concerts both independently and as a part of international music festivals including Istanbul International Jazz Festival and Antalya International Jazz Festival.

== Discography ==
- Tu despedida (1999)
- Vuela (2001)
- De cal y arena (2003)
- A vida (2006)
- Autorretrato (2007)
- Mar blanca (en memoria de Antonio Molina) (2012)
- En clave de noche (en directo) (2016)

== Collaborations ==
- ¡Mira que eres canalla, Aute! (2000)
- Y todo es vanidad: Homenaje a Javier Krahe (2004)
- Newwoman: 30 tracks for a new woman (2006)
- Amar en tiempos revueltos (2006)
- Guantanamera. Un tributo a Cuba (2007)
- "Tiramisú de limón" (music video), from Joaquín Sabina's album Vinagre y rosas (2009)
- En clave de noche (en directo) — song "Locamente" with Juan Antonio Valderrama (2006)
