= List of Uruguayan films =

A list of films produced in Uruguay.

== 1923-1940 ==
Title	Director	Cast	Genre	Notes
1923
Souls on the Coast	Juan Antonio Borges		Drama	
1926
Catástrofe de Encarnación	Hipólito Carrón			
1928
1929
El pequeño héroe del arroyo de oro (The Golden River's Little Hero)	Carlos Alonso		silent	24th Festival des 3 Continents; Nantes
1930
1932
1936
Two Destinies	Juan Etchebehere		Drama	
1938
1940
1942
1946
The Three Musketeers	Julio Saraceni	Armando Bó, Roberto Airaldi	Historical adventure	Argentine-Uruguayan co-production
1949
Pupila al viento (A Pupil in the Wind)	Enrico Gras		poetic documentary	24th Festival des 3 Continents; Nantes
The Detective Goes the Wrong Way	Adolfo L. Fabregat			

== 1950s ==
Title	Director	Cast	Genre	Notes
1950
1951
1952
1953
1954
1955
Codicia	Catrano Catrani			
1956
1957
1958
1959
La ciudad en la playa (The City at the Beach)	Ferrucio Mussitelli			24th Festival des 3 Continents; Nantes

== 1960s ==
Title	Director	Cast	Genre	Notes
1960
1961
1962
La Burrerita de Ypacaraí	Armando Bó			
1963
1964
1965
1966
1967
1968
1969

== 1970s ==
Title	Director	Cast	Genre	Notes
1970
1971
1972
1973
1974
1975
1976
1977
1978
O Amante de Minha Mulher	Alberto Pieralisi			
1979
El lugar del humo	Eva Landeck	George Hilton	Drama	Uruguayan-Argentine co-production

== 1980s ==
Title	Director	Cast	Genre	Notes
1980
1981
1982
1983
1984
1985
1986
Cariñoso	Manuel Cuenca; Luis Ughelli			
1987
El Caso de Luis	Reinaldo Martinez; Marcial Ruiz Diaz			TV film
Caños	Marilyn Maciel			
Cerro Corá	Guillermo Vera			
1988
1989

== 1990s ==
Title	Director	Cast	Genre	Notes
1990
1991
1992
1993
1994
The Dirigible	Pablo Dotta			
1995
1996
1997
Abuso sexual	Manuel Cuenca			
Asunción a cuatro tiempos	Manuel Cuenca			
Cachorros de león, la batalla de Boqueron	Manuel Cuenca			
Caireles de sangre, 23 de octubre de 1931	Manuel Cuenca			
1998
1999
El chevrolé	Leonardo Ricagni	Jorge Esmoris, Rubén Rada, Leo Maslíah, Hugo Fattoruso, Pastora Vega	Comedy	

== 2000s ==
Title	Director	Cast	Genre	Notes
2000
Ácratas	Virginia Martínez			
Plata quemada	Marcelo Piñeyro	Eduardo Noriega, Leonardo Sbaraglia, Pablo Echarri		
2001
Llamada para un cartero (A Call for a Postman)	Brummell Pommerenk			24th Festival des 3 Continents; Nantes
25 Watts	Pablo Stoll; Juan Pablo Rebella	Daniel Hendler, Jorge Temponi, Alfonso Tort	Comedy	24th Festival des 3 Continents; Nantes
In This Tricky Life	Beatriz Flores Silva			
2002
The Last Train	Diego Arsuaga	Héctor Alterio, Federico Luppi, Pepe Soriano		
La espera (The Wait)	Aldo Garay			24th Festival des 3 Continents; Nantes
2003
Candida				
Seawards Journey	Guillermo Casanova	Hugo Arana, Julio César Castro	Drama	
2004
La Cajita feliz	Jorge Pettengill			
Whisky	Juan Pablo Rebella; Pablo Stoll			
Bolivia 3: Confederation Next	Martín Sastre	Short film		
2005
O Amigo Dunor	José Eduardo Alcázar			
Cándido López - Los campos de batalla	José Luis García			
Cenizas				
Alma Mater	Álvaro Buela			
Diana: The Rose Conspiracy	Martín Sastre		Short film	
2006
The Minder	Rodrigo Moreno	Julio Chávez, Osmar Núñez		
2007
El Baño del Papa	César Charlone; Enrique Fernández	César Troncoso		
Fan	Gabriela Guillermo	Gabriela Iribarren, María Mendive, Eduardo Méndez	Drama	
2008
Tren Fantasma	Dario Nuñez		Short film	
Acne	Federico Veiroj			
2009
Ataque de pánico!	Fede Álvarez		Short film	
Giant	Adrián Biniez			
Bad Day to Go Fishing	Alvaro Brechner			
Leo's Room	Enrique Buchichio			

== 2010s ==
Title	Director	Cast	Genre	Notes
2010
The Silent House	Gustavo Hernández		Horror	
A Useful Life	Federico Veiroj		Drama	
Yours	Ivan Mazza		Short film	
Miss Tacuarembó	Martín Sastre		Musical	
2012
7 Sea Pirates	Walter Tournier			
3	Pablo Stoll	Humberto de Vargas, Sara Bessio, Anaclara Ferreyra Palfy, Inés Bortagaray, Néstor Guzzini, Santiago Pedrero, Matías Ganz, Carolina Centurión, Fabián Arenillas	Comedy-drama	
The Delay	Rodrigo Plá			
Between Valleys	Philippe Barcinski	Ângelo Antônio, Daniel Hendler		Brazil-Germany-Uruguay co-production
2013
Anina	Alfredo Soderguit	Federica Lacaño, María Mendive, César Troncoso, Cristina Morán, Petru Valensky, Roberto Suárez	Comedy	Selected as the Uruguayan entry for the Best Foreign Language Film at the 86th Academy Awards
2014
A Moonless Night	Germán Tejeira	Roberto Suárez, Daniel Melingo, Marcel Keoroglian, Elisa Gagliano	Drama	Selected as the Uruguayan entry for the Best Foreign Language Film at the 88th Academy Awards
Mr. Kaplan	Álvaro Brechner	Héctor Noguera, Rolf Becker, Néstor Guzzini, Nidia Telles	Comedy-drama	Selected as the Uruguayan entry for the Best Foreign Language Film at the 87th Academy Awards, but was not nominated; joint win for Best Actor (Héctor Norguera & Néstor Guzzini) at 15th Havana Film Festival New York
Portrait of Animal Behavior	Florencia Colucci & Gonzalo Lugo	Florencia Colucci, Gonzalo Lugo, Rocío Piferrer, Jorge Bolani	Romantic comedy, Road movie	
Zanahoria	Enrique Buchichio	César Troncoso, Martín Rodríguez, Abel Tripaldi, Nelson Guzzini, Mónica Navarro, Victoria Césperes, Carlos Vallarino, Ana Rosa, Martín Pavlovsky	Drama	
The Midfielder	Adrián Biniez			
2015
The Apostate	Federico Veiroj			
La luz incidente	Ariel Rotter	Érica Rivas, Susana Pampin, Marcelo Subiotto		
My Friend from the Park	Ana Katz	Julieta Zylberberg, Andrés Milicich, Mirella Pascual		
2016
Breadcrumbs	Manane Rodríguez	Cecilia Roth, Justina Bustos, María Pujalte, Margarita Musto, Stefanía Crocce, Sonia Méndez, Nuria Fló, Patxi Bisquert, Sergio Quintana, Ernesto Chao, María Vidal, Artur Trillo	Drama	Selected as the Uruguayan entry for the Best Foreign Language Film at the 89th Academy Awards
2017
Another Story of the World	Guillermo Casanova	Alfonsina Carrocio, Susana Castro, Nicolás Condito, Cecilia Cósero, Christian Font, Jenny Goldstein	Comedy	Selected as the Uruguayan entry for the Best Foreign Language Film at the 90th Academy Awards
Get the Weed	Denny Brechner, Alfonso Guerrero & Marcos Hecht	Denny Brechner, Talma Friedler, Gustavo Olmos, José Mujica, Ignacio Roqueta, Barack Obama, Sean Penn, Steven Tyler	Mockumentary, Comedy	
Invisible	Pablo Giorgelli			
Lila's Book	Marcela Rincón González		Animation	
El otro hermano	Adrián Caetano	Leonardo Sbaraglia, Daniel Hendler		
Ojos de madera	Roberto Suárez			
2018
Belmonte	Federico Veiroj			
Porn for Newbies	Carlos Ameglio	Martín Piroyansky, Nicolás Furtado, Carolina Mânica, Daniel Aráoz, Nuria Fló, Roberto Suárez, Denny Brechner, Jorge Bazzano	Comedy	
Super Crazy	Martino Zaidelis		Comedy	
A Twelve-Year Night	Álvaro Brechner		Historical drama	Selected as the Uruguayan entry for the Best Foreign Language Film at the 91st Academy Awards
El Pepe: A Supreme Life	Emir Kusturica		Documentary	
You Shall Not Sleep	Gustavo Hernández	Belén Rueda, Eva de Dominici, Natalia de Molina	Horror thriller	
2019
The Sharks	Lucía Garibaldi		Coming-of-age, Drama	
Alelí	Leticia Jorge		Comedy-drama	Selected as the Uruguayan entry for the Best International Feature Film at the 93rd Academy Awards
The Moneychanger	Federico Veiroj		Comedy	Selected as the Uruguayan entry for the Best International Feature Film at the 92nd Academy Awards
Monos	Alejandro Landes			
Los sonámbulos	Paula Hernández	Érica Rivas, Ornella D'Elía, Marilú Marini		

== 2020s ==
Title	Director	Cast	Genre	Notes
2020
Carmen Vidal Female Detective	Eva Dans	Eva Dans, Roberto Suárez, Luciano Demarco, Nicolás Luzardo, Leonor Courtoisie, Gimena González, Bruno Contenti, Gustavo Cabrera, Enrique Bastos	Neo-noir, Comedy thriller	
The Last Matinee	Maximiliano Contenti		Horror	
Window Boy Would Also Like to Have a Submarine	Alex Piperno	Daniel Quiroga, Inés Bortagaray, Noli Tobol as Noli	Experimental, Fantasy, Romantic comedy	
2021
The Broken Glass Theory	Diego Fernández		Comedy	Selected as the Uruguayan entry for the Best International Feature Film at the 94th Academy Awards
The Employer and the Employee	Manolo Nieto	Nahuel Pérez Biscayart, Justina Bustos, Cristian Borges, Fátima Quintanilla, Jean Pierre Noher	Drama	Selected as the Uruguayan entry for the Best International Feature Film at the 95th Academy Awards
2022
9	Martín Barrenechea; Nicolás Branca	Enzo Vogrincic, Rafael Spregelburd, Horacio Camandulle, Rogelio Gracia, Roxana Blanco, Lara Sofía, Santiago Sanguinetti	Sports, Drama	
The Visitor	Martín Boulocq	Enrique Araoz, Svet Mena, César Troncoso, Mirella Pascual, Teresa Gutierrez, Romel Vargas	Drama	Selected as the Bolivian entry for the Best International Feature Film at the 96th Academy Awards
2023
The Door Is There	Facundo Ponce de León, Juan Ponce de León		Documentary	Nominated - Best Documentary at the 79th CEC Awards Selected as the Uruguayan entry for the Best International Feature Film at the 97th Academy Awards
Family Album	Guillermo Rocamora	Diego Cremonesi, Franco Rizzaro, Valeria Lois, Alfonso Tort, Vicente Pieri, Roberto Suárez, Ángela Torres	Comedy	Selected as the Uruguayan entry for the Best International Feature Film at the 96th Academy Awards
Women on the Edge	Azul Lombardía	Carla Peterson, Julieta Díaz, Salvador del Solar, Esteban Lamothe, Eugenia Guerty, Celina Font, Jazmín Rodríguez, Martin Garabal, Lalo Rotavaria, Brenda Kreizerman, Alfonso Tort, Cecilia Dopazo, Nancy Dupláa, Fito Páez, Claudia Fernández, Maitina De Marco, Nazarena Nobile	Comedy	Premiered on September 28
2024
Bitter Gold	Juan Francisco Olea	Katalina Sánchez, Francisco Melo, Michael Silva, Daniel Antivilo, Moisés Angulo, Carlos Donoso, Carla Moscatelli, Matias Catalán, Carlos Rodríguez, Anibal Vásquez, Carlos Troncoso	Neo-Western, Thriller, Drama	Nominated - Warsaw Grand Prix at the 40th Warsaw Film Festival Winner - Ecumenical Jury Award at the 40th Warsaw Film Festival An international co-production with Chile, Germany and Mexico
Don't You Let Me Go	Agarrame fuerte	Chiara Hourcade, Victoria Jorge, Eva Dans, Fernando Amaral	Drama	Nominated - Best International Narrative Feature at the 23rd Tribeca Film Festival Winner - Nora Ephron Award at the 23rd Tribeca Film Festival Winner - Best International Feature Film at the 61st Antalya Golden Orange Film Festival Nominated - Colón de Oro at the 45th Havana Film Festival Nominated - Best Ibero-American Film at the 39th Goya Awards In co-production with Estonia Premiered on October 26
The Silence of Marcos Tremmer	Miguel García de la Calera	Benjamín Vicuña, Adriana Ugarte, Félix Gómez, Daniel Hendler, Enrique Villén, Hony Estrella, Mirta Busnelli, Irene Ferreiro, Rodo Castañares, Julián Valcárcel, Walter Rey, Andrés López Sierra	Romantic drama	Nominated - Latin-American Competition for Best Film at the 39th Mar del Plata International Film Festival An international co-production with Spain, the Dominican Republic and Chile It was commercially released on January 2, 2025 in Uruguayan theaters
Stay Still	Joanna Lombardi	Hilton Gratelly, Hilda Curo, María Cristina Pérez, Melvin Quijada, Roxana Herrera	Docufiction	Premiered on 6 March at the 27th Málaga Film Festival Nominated - Best Documentary at the 27th Málaga Film Festival Nominated - Best Ibero-American Documentary Feature Film at the 39th Guadalajara International Film Festival An international co-production with Peru and the Netherlands
2025
Astronaut	Paul Vega	Daniel Hendler, Angie Cepeda, Salvador del Solar, Gustavo Bueno, Marco Zunino, Fiorella Luna, Miguel Iza, Emilram Cossio, Claudia Berninzon, Bernardo Scarpella	Drama	An international co-production with Peru and Colombia Premiered on July 31 in Uruguayan theaters
Dogs	Gerardo Minutti	Néstor Guzzini, Marcelo Subiotto, María Elena Pérez, Catalina Arrillaga, Noelia Campo, Roberto Suárez	Black comedy	Nominated - Best Latin-American Film at the 28th Málaga Film Festival Winner - Best Supporting Actress for María Elena Pérez at the 28th Málaga Film Festival In co-production with Argentina It was commercially released on September 25 in Uruguayan theaters
Papers	Arturo Montenegro	Megan Montaner, Carlos Bardem, Antonio Dechent, Gustavo Bassani, Jaime Newbal, Nick Romano, Agustín Della Corte, Verónica Ortiz, Henry Twohy, Leo Wiznitzer, Gaby Gnazzo, Stella Lauri, Andrea Pérez Meana, Alí Arrocha, Ana Sibauste, Ana Alejandra Carrizo, Carlos Alfredo Lopez, Andrés Clemente, Roberto Thomas-Díaz, Paulette Thomas, Luis Franco Brantley, Enitzabel Castrellon	Thriller, Drama	An international co-production with Panama and Spain
The Whisper	Gustavo Hernández Ibañez	Luciano Cáceres, Ana Clara Guanco, Marcelo Michinaux, Darío Lima, Horacio Camandulle, Rasjid César, Joro Gorfain, Machu Gutiérrez	Horror	Nominated - Best Feature Film at the 58th Sitges Film Festival Winner - Gold Skull at the 18th Mórbido Fest Winner - Best Feature Film at the Buenos Aires Rojo Sangre Winner - Best Director at the Buenos Aires Rojo Sangre In co-production with Argentina It was commercially released on 22 January 2026 in Uruguayan theaters

== See also ==
- List of Uruguayan documentary films
