= List of Uruguayan documentary films =

This is a list of documentary films produced in the Uruguayan cinema, ordered by year and decade of release.

== 1890s ==
- 1898: Carrera de bicicletas en el velódromo de Arroyo Seco (Bicycle race at the Arroyo Seco velodrome), produced by Félix Oliver.

== 1940s ==
- 1949: Pupila al viento (A Pupil in the Wind), directed by Enrico Gras. 24th Festival des 3 Continents, Nantes.

== 1990s ==
- 1997: Dieste, la conciencia de la forma, directed by Mario Jacob.

== 2000s ==
- 2000: Ácratas (Anarchists), written and directed by Virginia Martínez.
- 2002:
  - A pesar de Treblinka (Despite Treblinka), directed by Gerardo Stawsky.
  - Aparte (Aside), directed by Mario Handler.
- 2004: A las cinco en punto (At Five O'Clock Sharp), directed by José Pedro Charlo.
- 2007:
  - El gran simulador (The Great Pretender), directed by Eduardo Montes-Bradley.
  - La sociedad de la nieve (Stranded: I've come from a plane that crashed on the mountains), written and directed by Gonzalo Arijón.
- 2008:
  - Decile a Mario que no vuelva (Tell Mario Not to Come Back), written and directed by Mario Handler.
  - Cachila, directed by Sebastián Bednarik and Andrés Varela.

== 2010s ==
- 2014: Maracaná, directed by Sebastián Bednarik and Andrés Varela.
- 2017:
  - El Pepe, una vida suprema (El Pepe: A Supreme Life), directed by Emir Kusturica.
  - Roslik y el pueblo de las caras sospechosamente rusas, directed by Julián Goyoaga.

== 2020s ==
- 2023: Hay una puerta ahí (The Door Is There), written and directed by Facundo Ponce de León and Juan Ponce de León. Submitted for the 97th Academy Awards for Best International Feature Film.
- 2024:
  - Jorge Batlle: entre el cielo y el infierno (Jorge Batlle: Between Heaven and Hell), filmed and directed by Federico Lemos.
  - Quédate quieto (Stay Still), written and directed by Joanna Lombardi.

== See also ==
- List of Uruguayan films
