= Cinema of Uruguay =

- No. of screens: 61 (2011)
  - Per capita: 2.0 per 100,000 (2011)

Produced feature films (2005-2009)
- Total: 11 (average)

Number of admissions (2010)
- Total: 2,300,000

Gross box office (2009)
- Total: $16.6 million
- National films: $437,285 (4.1%)

The cinema of Uruguay has a role in the culture of Uruguay and is a part of Latin American cinema. Since the late 1990s, Uruguayan cinema has undergone a process of evolution, during which its films have received positive reviews and been internationally recognized. Over 120 films, fiction and non-fiction, have been produced since then. In particular, the first quarter of the 21st century has been extremely prolific.

== History ==
=== The early years ===
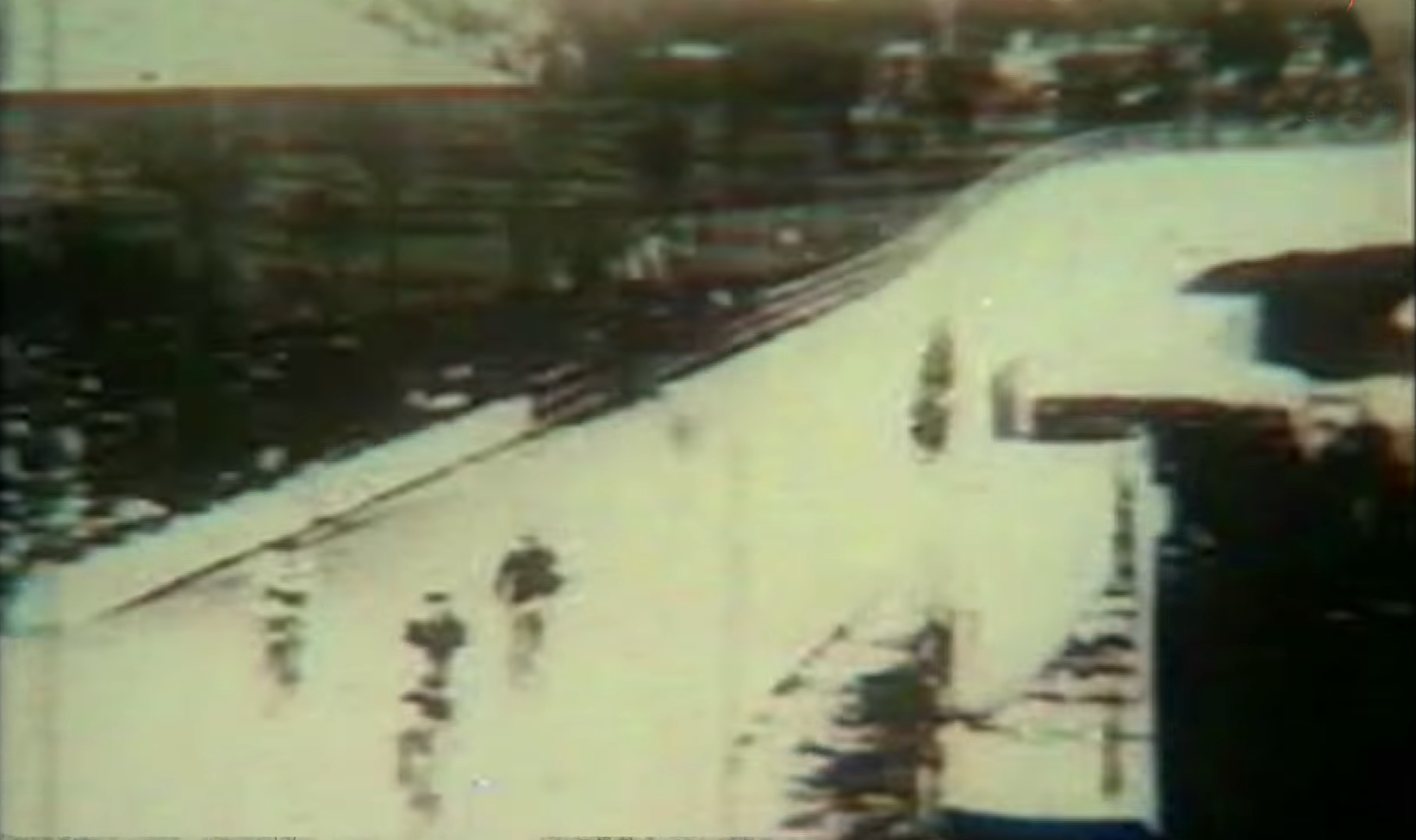
Bicycle Race in the Arroyo Seco Velodrome, first film of Uruguay.

Louis Lumière's invention was introduced to Uruguayan audiences on July 18, 1898, at the Salón Rouge, a popular local cabaret. Local businessman Félix Oliver purchased Uruguay's first film, camera and projector from the Lumiére brothers themselves; with them he made Bicycle Race in the Arroyo Seco Velodrome, the second film produced in Latin America.

With his first short film a success, Oliver established the country's first film studio and continued to make documentaries. One of Argentina's first cinematographers, French-born Henri Corbicier, took Uruguayan film in a new direction when he produced The Peace of 1904, a documentary about Uruguay's recent political conflict and its resolution. Corbicier continued to produce newsreels and documentaries for the Uruguayan public for some time and influenced others to do the same.

Receiving most of their commercial films from Argentine studios, Uruguayan audiences saw no domestic fiction film titles until, in 1919, the local non-profit society Bonne Garde financed Pervanche, directed by León Ibáñez. Unsuccessful, the effort was the country's only one of its type until Juan Antonio Borges' Souls on the Coast. Released in 1923, it is considered to be the first Uruguayan feature film. Its studio, Charrúa Films, produced one more feature film (Adventures of a Parisian Girl in Montevideo) before closing in 1927.

Inspiring others, however, this modest beginning led Carlos Alonso to produce The Little Hero of Arroyo de Oro in 1929; the film, a realist tragedy set in the countryside, was in the vanguard due to its frank and graphic depiction of domestic violence and was the first commercially successful Uruguayan film.

Despite other difficulties, the year 1930 provided Uruguayan film makers an unexpected opportunity when their national football team won that year's World Cup. Justino Zavala Muñiz produced documentaries on the event, which also coincided with the 100th anniversary of the Uruguayan Constitution. His success enabled him to establish the Uruguayan Cine-Club, from where he premiered the acclaimed Sky, Water and Sea Lions, among other documentaries and fiction films.

The Great Depression, however, soon dampened local film makers' plans and audiences would have to wait until 1936 to see the next locally produced film.

=== The Golden Age ===
In 1936, Ciclolux Studios purchased Uruguay's first equipment for the production of film sound and released director Juan Etchebehere's Two Destinies. Socially aware, the film is reminiscent of Great Expectations and was made despite the repressive atmosphere that prevailed in Uruguay during President Gabriel Terra's règime. Beset by censorship, Argentine film imports, and global instability, local filmmaking remained limited to documentaries, newsreels and lighthearted comedies and musicals.

A joint venture between Argentine and Uruguayan investors, however, resulted in Orión Studios. The studio produced four well-received full-length dramas between 1946 and 1948, and reintroduced local audiences to Uruguayan drama film with Argentine Director Julio Saraceni's version of The Three Musketeers and Belisario García Villar's version of Italian novelist Luigi Pirandello's Come tu me vuoi. The renewed activity brought Kurt Land to Uruguay, where he made The Thief of Dreams.

The post-war era continued to bring audiences well-received comedies such as Adolfo Fabregat's The Detective Goes the Wrong Way (1949) and documentaries such as Enrico Gras' Artigas: Protector of Free Peoples (1950), although dramatic full-length titles continued to struggle. Documentaries continued to be the local film industry's standby. Miguel Ángel Melino's ode to the Uruguayan independence saga, The Arrival of the Thirty-Three Easterners (1952) earned him plaudits and a long-term contract with the National Party for campaign film productions.

Years passed with no local drama titles until 1959, when Hugo Ulive made A Song for Judas, a realistic ode to the struggling troubadour. The realist and neorealist film genre found wider acceptance locally and Ulive and others made a number of cultural documentaries and, after 1960, films to promote tourism.

=== Winds of change ===
The shifting intellectual discourse in much of the western world during the 1960s influenced Uruguayan culture quickly and extensively. Among filmmakers this was evidenced by the production of muck-raking titles aimed at encouraging social awareness. Mario Handler's Carlos: Portrait of a Montevideo Panhandler represented a local form of cinéma vérité that drew on Uruguayan film makers' tradition as documentarians. Increasingly the target of harassment, Handler followed this with studies on student protests such as the unequivocal I Like Students (1968), Líber Arce: Liberation (1969) and a work about a massive local meatpacker strike entitled The Uruguayan Beef Shortage of 1969.

Following Handler's exile to Venezuela in 1972 Uruguayan film makers increasingly limited themselves to conventional subjects and, aside from Jorge Fornio and Raúl Quintín's 1973 flop Maribel's Peculiar Family (the first Uruguayan film produced in color), local full length productions of all types ceased until 1979. In that year, the new dictatorship's public relations office (DINARP) recruited Argentine director Eva Landeck and Spaghetti Western veteran George Hilton to make Land of Smoke, a feature so disliked by the public that it caused the producers' bankruptcy.

In 1980, the DINARP opted to give director Eduardo Darino practically free rein over the production of Gurí, a gaucho tale based on Serafín García's homonymous novel. The film revived the local film industry and drew Hollywood's attention as well. The following year, Eli Wallach accepted the leading role in a version adapted for American television.

Correction: GURI was produced by Zenit Intl. US, Eli Wallach participated from day one, and Darino had plans for 3 films produced by Richard Allen with HBO Interest. DINARP requested that Enrique Guarnero play the father role for Uruguay. Darino completed the film but backed off from the other two titles. Robert Miller, Zenit Intl. Production VP.

Similar conditions enabled Juan Carlos Rodríguez Castro to make The Murder of Venancio Flores in 1982. Based on events surrounding the assassinations of President Venancio Flores and former President Bernardo Berro in 1868, the film fared meagerly at the local box office; but it earned an honorable mention at the prestigious Huelva Film Festival. The accomplishment, earned during Uruguay's deepest economic crisis since 1930, encouraged Luis Varela to make The Winner Takes All, an indictment of the wave of financial fraud that Uruguay (and much of Latin America) was subject to around 1980.

=== Challenges and freedom ===
Beset by a nearly unprecedented socioeconomic crisis, Uruguay's last dictator, Gen. Gregorio Álvarez, called elections for 1984. Initially, the advent of democracy under Julio Sanguinetti could do little for the local film industry economically. However, renewed freedoms encouraged the growth of the Uruguayan video industry (a genre less limited by distribution costs, for instance). Local video producers such as CEMA and Imágenes ushered in the new era with politically controversial titles such as Guillermo Casanova's The Dead, and Carlos Ameglio and Diego Arsuaga's The Last Vermicelli. Other video production houses, such as Grupo Hacedor touched on social problems, as in the violent Fast Life (1992) and traditional screen filmmakers also made their presence felt. For example, César de Ferrari and his documentary General Elections, which focused on the plight of veteran leftist Wilson Ferreira Aldunate and his banishment from the 1984 elections.

Uruguay's economy began to recover despite the weight of foreign debt interest payments. But continuing difficulties led Beatriz Flores Silva to make The Almost-True Story of Pepita the Gunslinger, a drama based on a 1988 incident involving a middle-class lady in dire straits and her audacious assault on a number of Montevideo banks. Released in 1994, the film did well locally and in Spain.

Addressing local filmmakers' economic difficulties, the city of Montevideo established FONA and the national government created INA, two funds designed to subsidize local projects that might not otherwise see the light of day. These funds enabled Alejandro Bazzano to make Underground, a futurist 1997 TV pilot. The series, however, was soon canceled. Pablo Rodríguez's Gardel: Echoes of Silence (about the legendary Tango vocalist) met a similar fate. Despite these, setbacks, the year 1997 ended on a positive note for local film with Alvaro Buela's deceptively simple A Way to Dance and Diego Arsuaga's film-noir, Otario.

Uruguayan directors pursued increasingly varied subject matter from 1998, including Leonardo Ricagni's surreal The Chevrolet and Esteban Schroeder's mystery, The Vineyard. Luis Nieto took an Ibsen-esque turn with The Memory of Blas Quadra (2000), and Pablo Rodríguez lived down his previous disappointment with Damned Cocaine (2001). Brummell Pommerenck portrayed existential loneliness in Call for the Postman (2001), Luis Nieto returned to deal with a former extremist back from exile in The Southern Star (2002) and Pablo Stoll and Juan Pablo Rebella gave an empathetic portrayal of youth in 25 Watts (2002); their dark comedy, Whisky (2003) earned the Un Certain Regard Prize at the Cannes Film Festival. Marcelo Bertalmío's existential Noise (2005) was well received and won the Audience Award at the Valladolid International Film Festival. Valeria Puig wrote, produced and directed Confesiones de un taxista (2011) which was a finalist at the Nashville Film Festival.

The rustic Uruguayan countryside piqued the interest of foreign filmmakers as well. Swiss Director Bruno Soldini used the rural setting for The Brickmasons of Tapes a 1989 period piece filmed in Italian. Likewise, local filmmakers used the same bucolic setting to make two Uruguay/Argentina co-productions: Diego Arsuaga's unyielding The Last Train (2002) and Guillermo Casanova's sentimental Seawards Journey (2003).

Uruguayan film production continues to make its modest though influential presence felt in the vast array of Latin American films, producing four to six films per year and contributing to other countries' film industries, as well, with talent such as Director Israel Adrián Caetano, who has made a number of acclaimed Argentine films since co-directing Pizza, Beer and Smokes in 1997.

=== A notable century ===
The first 25 years of this century have seen the creation of numerous national film productions.

== Documentaries ==
Uruguayan cinema has a long tradition in documentaries, with more than eighty films. One of its greatest exponents is director Mario Handler, a Latin American referent since the 1960s. His films depict harsh histories of his country, such as Me gustan los estudiantes (I Like Students, 1968), Aparte (Aside, 2003), and Decile a Mario que no vuelva (Tell Mario Not to Come Back, 2007).

Other notable films include: Ácratas (Anarchists), by Virginia Martínez; Perejiles, by Federico González; Hit, by Claudia Abend and Adriana Loeff; El círculo (The Circle), by José Pedro Charlo and Aldo Garay; La sociedad de la nieve (Society of the Snow), by Gonzalo Arijón; A pesar de Treblinka (In Spite of Treblinka) by Gerardo Stawsky; Las flores de mi familia (Flowers of my Family), by Juan Ignacio Fernández Hope; Chico ferry, by Federico Beltramelli; El Bella Vista, by Alicia Cano; La matinée, Cachila and Mundialito 80, by Sebastián Bednarik; Desde adentro (From Inside), by Vasco Elola; Manyas, la película, by Andrés Benvenuto; Maracaná, la película, by Sebastián Bednarik and Andrés Varela; and Cometas sobre los muros (Kites Over the Walls), by Federico Pritsch.

== Locations in Uruguay ==
In recent years, Uruguay has become an interesting country for locations, experiencing a boom of films and commercials being shot there. A highlight was the 2006 version of the film Miami Vice: the Old City of Montevideo was the set chosen to imitate La Habana Vieja, the Rambla of Montevideo as the Malecón, and Atlántida with its Art Deco buildings gave life to parts of Miami.

In 2012, the Intendancy of Montevideo published a Location Guide for cinema directors, students and advertising agents.

== See also ==
- Cinema of the world
- List of Uruguayan films
- Uruguay International Film Festival
