= Fan (2007 film) =

2007 Uruguayan film

- Theatrical release poster
- Directed by: Gabriela Guillermo
- Starring: Gabriela Iribarren; María Mendive; Eduardo Méndez
- Release date: 2007
- Country: Uruguay

Fan is a 2007 Uruguayan drama film co-produced by Brazil, Venezuela and France. It was directed by Gabriela Guillermo and stars Gabriela Iribarren, María Mendive and Eduardo Méndez.

== Plot ==
Ela returns to her country to reconnect with friends and herself. Disoriented, she must choose between unattainable love, that of the Brazilian singer she has fallen in love with from afar, and real love, the one she has just found in Noé.

== Cast ==
- Gabriela Iribarren (Ela)
- María Mendive (Ela's friend)
- Eduardo Méndez (Noé)

== See also ==
- Cinema of Uruguay
- List of Uruguayan films
