= Aún soltera =

Book by Dani Umpi

- Mansalva edition
- Author: Dani Umpi
- Original title: Aún soltera
- Language: Spanish
- Genre: narrative
- Publisher: Eloísa Cartonera, Mansalva
- Publication date: 2003, 2006
- Publication place: Uruguay
- Pages: 108
- ISBN: 987-22648-5-6
- Followed by: Miss Tacuarembó

Aún soltera is the first book of the Uruguayan Dani Umpi. It was published in 2003. The novel describes how a casual relationship can change a person with an armed scheme of life.

Published by Eloísa Cartonera, this book was reprinted by Mansalva Edition in 2006.
