= Yours (film) =

- Directed by: Ivan Mazza
- Written by: Ivan Mazza
- Produced by: Mike Medina; Ivan Mazza; Gabriel Massa
- Starring: Albi De Abreu; Armando Cabrera; Prakriti Maduro
- Cinematography: Douglas Morillo
- Edited by: Iván Quijada
- Music by: Juan Carlos Redondo
- Release date: 2010
- Running time: 30 minutes
- Countries: Uruguay; Venezuela
- Language: Spanish

Yours (Original Spanish title: Tuya) is a 2010 Venezuelan and Uruguayan fantasy drama film, directed by Ivan Mazza.

== Plot ==
One night, while returning home by bus, Jorge (Albi De Abreu) receives a box from a strange old man. After he throws it away, the mysterious box keeps coming back to haunt him and test him in unexpected ways.

== Cast ==
- Albi De Abreu ... Jorge
- Armando Cabrera ... El Viejo
- Luigi Sciamanna ... Gustaf
- Rafael Soliwoda ... Marcelo
- Prakriti Maduro ... Amalia
- María de Los ángeles García ... Muchacha En Autobús
- Victoria Medina ... Gustavito

== Production ==
Yours is an independently financed short film, produced by Mike Medina and Ivan Mazza. It was filmed in Caracas, mostly in the El Hatillo Municipality. Filming took five non consecutive days during the month of April 2009. Editing and sound post production took place in Caracas for a period of six months. Color correction was finished in Montevideo, Uruguay, in the second week of the month of February 2010. It was premiered in the 50th Cartagena Film Festival in the Official Iberoamerican Competition that took place between the 25th of February and the 5th of March 2010.

== Recognition ==
=== Film Awards ===
- 28th Uruguay International Film Festival 2010
  - Best Short Film (Winner)
- 14th Florianopolis Audiovisual Mercosur (FAM 2011)
  - Best Short Film (Winner Audience Award)

=== Official selections ===
- 50th Cartagena Film Festival 2010
  - Best Iberoamerican Short Film (Nominated)
- 42nd Nashville Film Festival 2011
  - Best Short Film (Nominated)
- 27th Bogotá Film Festival 2010
  - Best Short Film (Nominated)
- 6th Cinemaissí Film Festival 2010
  - Best Short Film (Nominated)
