= Mendive (surname) =

Mendive is a surname of Basque origin.

== People with the name ==
- Manuel Mendive (born 1944), Afro-Cuban artist
- María Mendive (born 1968), Uruguayan actress and theater director
- Ron Mendive, Idaho politician

== See also ==
- Mendive, a commune in the Pyrénées-Atlantiques department, France
