= Denis Matrosov =

Russian actor of theatre and cinema (born 1973)

- Дени́с Влади́мирович Матро́сов
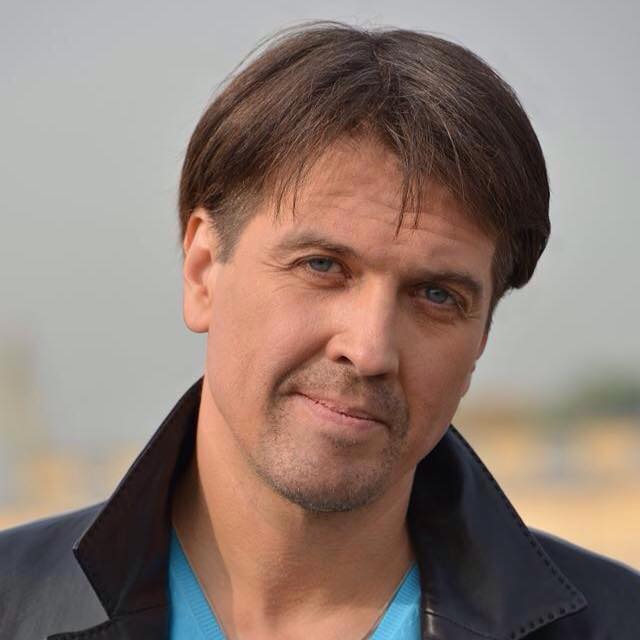
- Born: Denis Vladimirovich Matrosov; December 10, 1972 (age 52); Moscow, RSFSR, USSR
- Occupation(s): Actor, presenter
- Years active: 1989–present
- Spouse: Maria Kulikova (m. 2002)

Denis Vladimirovich Matrosov (Russian: Дени́с Влади́мирович Матро́сов; born December 10, 1972) is a Russian actor of theatre and cinema, also known for his roles in several Russian TV series and for his activity as a TV and radio presenter and as a radio DJ.

== Biography ==
Born on 10 December 1972 in Moscow, between 1979 and 1989 he attended School No. 34, a school providing intensive English classes. Between 1989 - 1991 he was a student of the Acting Faculty of the Moscow Art Theatre School. From 1991 to 1994, he studied at the Shepkin Higher Theatre Institute (N. A. Vereschenko’s course).

For one year, between 1994–1995, he completed his military service at the Theatre of the Russian Army, where he subsequently became an actor, working there for the following 8 years (until 2002).

Since 2002 he has been involved in several private theatrical enterprise projects.

Starting with February 2003 he plays the part of Lensky in the concert version of "Eugene Onegin" (by Pushkin) on Prokofiev’s music (conducted by Gerd Albrecht), touring in Vienna, Copenhagen and Moscow (Russian premiere on 10 May 2005).

He is married to Russian actress Maria Kulikova (since 2002).

== Theatre Work ==
1991 - 1994

- "Saturday, Sunday, and Monday" (by Eduardo De Filippo) – Attilio
- "Don Gil of the Green Breeches" (by Tirso De Molina) – Don Pedro
- "Fear and Misery of the Third Reich" (by Bertolt Brecht) – Traitor
- "Romeo and Juliet" (by William Shakespeare) – Romeo

1994 - 2002

- "Your Sister and Prisoner" – Earl of Leicester
- "Britannicus" – Nero
- "Paul the First" – Stepan
- "The Lady of the Camellias" – Gustave
- Musical "In the Busiest Place" – Senya
- Musical "The Wizard of Oz" – Toto
- "Chippolino" – Chippolino

== Private Theatrical Enterprise Performances ==
- "A Streetcar Named Desire" – Mitch
- "God Bless You, Monsieur!" – Atropos
- "Mad Weekend" – Frederic Walter
- "Khanuma" – Prince Kote Pantyashvily
- "Madness of Love" – Henry Boten
- "Piparkukas" – Anton

Since February 2003 – concert version of "Eugene Onegin" ( by Pushkin) on Prokofiev’s music ( conducted by Gerd Albrecht) – Lensky

== Filmography ==
- 1990 — Made in USSR — Lyoha
- 1996 — Love on a Raft — Mitya
- 2001 — Dustman — croupier
- 2001 — Stop on Demand 2 — card cheater
- 2001 — Fatalists
- 2002 — Don't Even Think About It! — croupier
- 2002 — Two Destinies — Vadim
- 2003 — People and Shadows 2. Optical Illusion — Vitaly Litovtsev
- 2003 — Give Me Life — Kostya
- 2005 — Sunday in the Women's Bathhouse
- 2005 — Кarmelita — Аnton Astakhov
- 2005 — My Love — Vadim Stroev
- 2005 — New Russian Romance
- 2006 — And Who Might You Be? — Victor
- 2006 — Detectives - 5 — Fiodor Tochiltsev
- 2007 — Squirrel on the Wheel — Кonstantin
- 2007 — Hold Me Tight — Daniil
- 2008 — Obsession — Dmitry Kolesnikov
- 2008 — Jail Is Never Too Far — Vyacheslav
- 2008 — Ukhnya
- 2009 — Karmelita. Gypsy Passion (Karmelita 2) — Аnton Astakhov
- 2010 — Snowstorm
- 2010 — The Cuckoo
