= Wood Eyes =

- Spanish: Ojos de madera
- Directed by: Roberto Suárez
- Starring: Pedro Cruz; Florencia Zabaleta; César Troncoso
- Release date: 2017
- Countries: Uruguay; Venezuela
- Language: Spanish

Wood Eyes (Spanish: Ojos de madera) is a 2017 Uruguayan film, made in co-production with Argentina and Venezuela. Directed by Roberto Suárez -his feature directorial debut- and co-directed by Germán Tejeira, it stars Pedro Cruz, Florencia Zabaleta and César Troncoso.

== Plot ==
In a story that mixes fantasy and reality, this children's horror story for adults shows what a child's eyes perceive that adults are unable to see.

Victor (Pedro Cruz), an 11-year-old boy, is adopted by his aunt and uncle (César Troncoso and Florencia Zabaleta) after the traumatic accident in which his parents died. Due to post-traumatic stress, he begins to suffer terrifying visions that haunt him. His uncles try to get close to him, but his vision of the world has already passed the barrier of sanity.

== Cast ==
- Pedro Cruz (Víctor)
- Florencia Zabaleta (aunt)
- César Troncoso (uncle)
- Guillermo Lamolle (toy maker)
- Yamandú Cruz (butcher)
- Elena Zuasti
- Haydée Fayerola
- Ana Victoria Killaian
- Gloria Demassi
- Soledad Pelayo
- Juan Sánchez

== Awards ==
In December 2017, it received awards from the Uruguayan Film Critics Association (ACCU) in the categories of national fiction, best director, revelation award (Suárez), actress (Zabaleta), photography, art direction, music and editing.

== See also ==
- Cinema of Uruguay
- List of Uruguayan films
