= Juan Carlos Mareco =

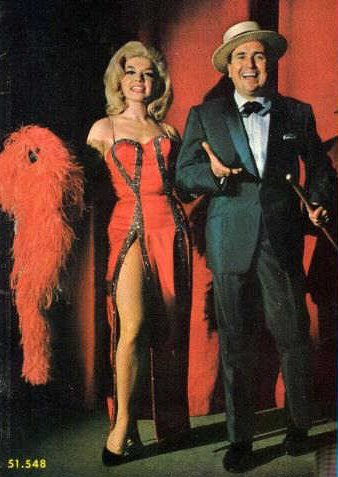
Juan Carlos Mareco and co-star Mariquita Gallegos in Otras pinochadas (1965).

Juan Carlos Mareco Iturburúa (January 20, 1926 – October 8, 2009) was a Uruguayan actor and radio and television talk show host. He achieved fame in Spain, Chile and Argentina from the 1960s onwards in comedy roles and as a television host in a variety of genres.

== Biography ==
Mareco was born in Carmelo, Uruguay in 1926. He debuted as actor in a local 1943 theatre production, El hombre más lindo del mundo (The Best-Looking Man in the World), and in Uruguayan film in a comedy, Detective a contramano (The Detective Goes the Wrong Way, 1949). Given third billing in Spanish director Alberto de Zavalía's El otro yo de Marcela (1950). He later joined Argentine latin jazz drummer Tito Alberti as a vocalist in Alberti's Jazz Casino Orchestra, touring throughout Latin America until 1957. Mareco eventually relocated to Spain in 1962. Nicknamed Pinocho (Pinocchio), he was cast by that stage name in a number of Spanish comedies during the 1950s and '60s, and was both the Spanish language voice actor and the foil for the South American version of Italian marionette Topo Gigio.

Settling in Argentina, he earned four Martín Fierro Awards from 1967 to 1972, but after 1976, faced political persecution in Argentina because of his Peronist sympathies. He returned to Argentine television after the 1982 Falklands War as host of a successful, no-frills afternoon talk show, Cordialmente.

Mareco would receive a total of eight Martín Fierro awards, as well as a Konex Award for Best Television Host in 1991, and remained on TV until his retirement.

Juan Carlos Mareco died on October 8, 2009, aged 83. His remains are buried at Cementerio Parque Jardín de Paz, in Pilar.

== Selected filmography ==
- The Detective Goes the Wrong Way (1949)
