= U From Uruguay =

2012 work of art by Martín Sastre

U From Uruguay, also known as “Pepe's Perfume”, is a conceptual piece featuring a perfume made by artist and director Martín Sastre with essences taken from the flowers grown by the President of Uruguay, José Mujica. Ninety percent of the funds raised by the perfume will be designated for the creation of the first National Contemporary Art Fund in support of Latin American artists. The video piece was made on the first Biennial of Montevideo curated by Alfons Hug under the title “The Great South", where it was exhibited from November 23, 2012 until March 30, 2013.

== The Piece ==
The fragrance was inspired by a trip the artist took with Lucía Topolansky, the Uruguayan president, and his wife to the president's farm, "Rincón del Cerro." While there, the three of them collected chrysanthemums and wild native Uruguayan herbs.

Only three bottles of the fragrance were produced. The first bottle is owned by President Mujica, the second by the artist, and the third bottle was auctioned on May 31, 2013 at the opening of the IILA (Instituto Italo-Latinoamericano) Pavilion during the 55th Venice Biennial. The art piece was part of the exhibition entitled “The Atlas of the Empire”, a contemporary cartography drawn by Italian and Latin American artists, commissioned by Sylvia Irrazábal, and curated by Alfons Hug with Paz Guevara. “U From Uruguay” the piece was acquired for $50,000 making the 33-millilitre bottle of "U from Uruguay" into the world's most expensive perfume fragrance that ever existed, surpassing " The Imperial Majesty” created in 1872 at the request of Queen Victoria of the United Kingdom valued at $1,400 per millilitre.

Under the message “This man can be your president” - with a photographic portrait of President Mujica at home next to his New Beetle – the postcards delivered invited the audience to take part in the auction and to send them, after having filled them up, to the Legal Citizenship Area in order to receive the necessary paperwork and thus becoming an Uruguayan citizen.

Mujica has been described in media as "the world’s poorest president" due to his austere lifestyle, including donating a large portion of his salary to social housing.

In these other parts of the world, newspaper headlines are often flooded with the prosecution of political leaders for enriching their pockets with public money, while also highlighting the humble lifestyle led by President Mujica in his farm at the outskirts of the capital city, where he grows his flowers.

“The true and only poverty is spiritual, and there is a controversy when deciding what is wealth and what is poverty. For me, the true luxury is having a president like Mujica. For me, the richest man is not the one who owns the most, but the one who shares the most” says Martín Sastre, and this phrase is the starting point of his project “U from Uruguay”.

Using “luxury's language” with a social aim, Martín Sastre created a promotional video piece for a perfume made with the essences of the flowers grown by President Mujica, and proposed that all proceeds from its sale would be intended for Uruguayan artists.

The video was shot in the central office of Banco de la República Oriental del Uruguay in Montevideo. Artist Marta Minujín exclaimed after the final bid "art, art, art".
