= Marzenka Novak =

Argentine actress (1945–2011)

Marzenka Novak (Poland, 2 September 1945 – Buenos Aires, 3 July 2011) was an acclaimed Polish-born Argentine actress.

She was the wife of actor Hugo Arana.

== Selected filmography ==
- 1979: Crazy Love
- 1979: The Island
- 1987: Made in Argentina
- 2002: Assassination Tango
- 2003: Imagining Argentina

== Television ==
- 1978: Juana rebelde
- 1980: Trampa para un soñador
- 1987: Clave de sol
- 1991: El árbol azul
- 1995: La nena
- 1998: La condena de Gabriel Doyle
