= Dani Umpi =

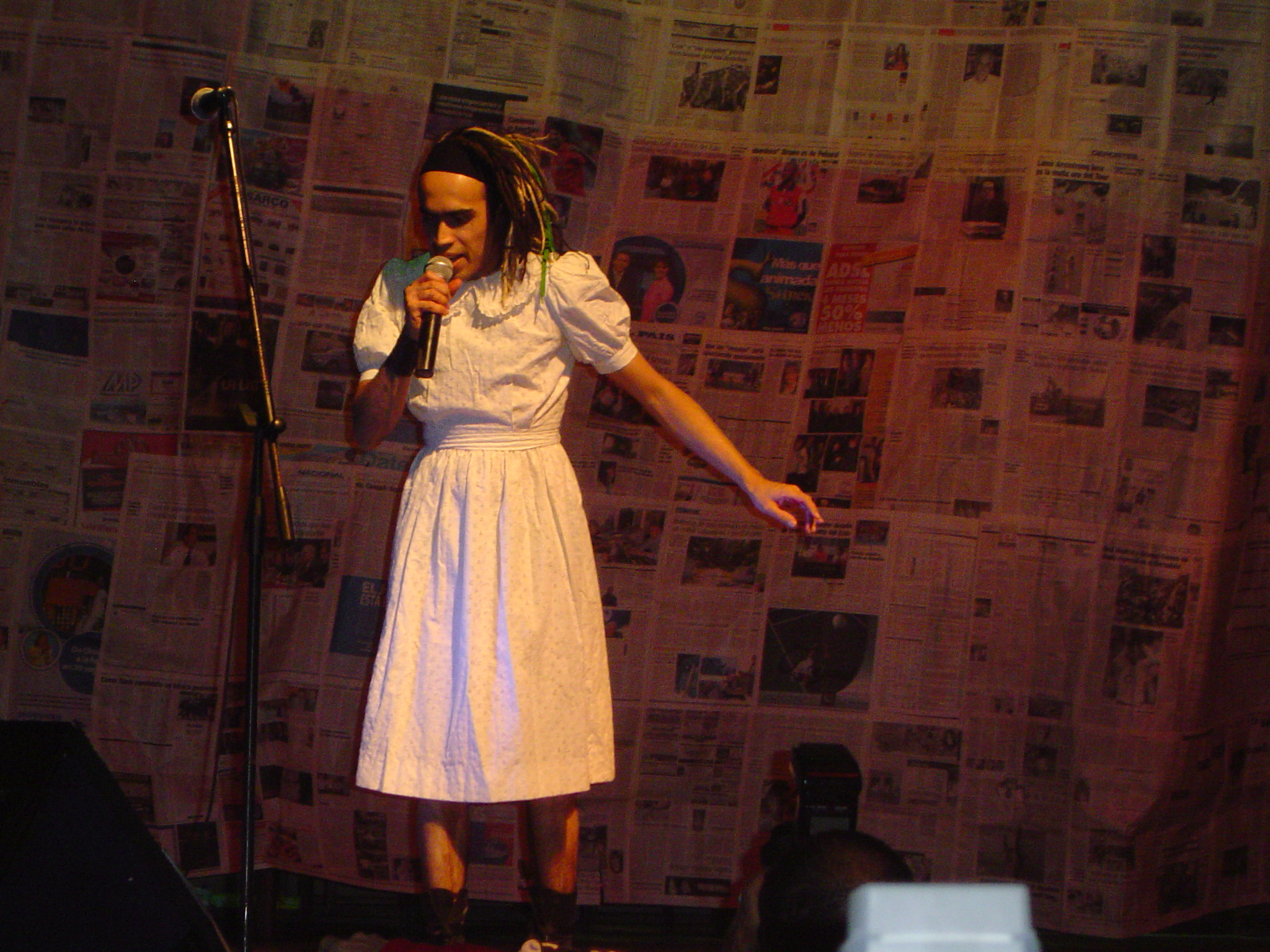
- Dani Umpi in 2006.
- Born: Daniel Umpiérrez; 1 November 1974 (age 51); Tacuarembó, Uruguay
- Occupations: Writer, artist, musician, singer and photographer
- Website: Dani Umpi

Daniel Umpiérrez (Tacuarembó, b, 1974) also known as Dani Umpi, is an Uruguayan artist, musician and writer.

== Biography ==
He was born in Tacuarembó, Uruguay, on 1 November 1974, to a Catholic family dedicated to ecumenical activities. He studied in the San Javier Jesuit College. He has lived in Montevideo since 1993.

As a musician, he has collaborated with Luciano Supervielle, Max Capote, Patricia Curzio, Carlos Perciavale, Wendy Sulca and Fito Paez, plus others.

== Books ==
Year	Title	ISBN	Publisher	Comments
2003	Aún soltera	987-22648-5-6	Eloísa Cartonera	
2004	Miss Tacuarembó	987-1180-03-9	Interzona Editora	
2006	Sólo te quiero como amigo	987-1180-34-9	Interzona Editora	
2006	Aún soltera		Mansalva	Republished
2009	Sólo te quiero como amigo		Estruendomudo	Republished
2010	La vueltita ridícula	978-987-1405-20-6	Vestales	
2010	Nena, no robarás	978-987-1075-87-4	Libros del Rojas	
2011	El vestido de mamá	978-9974-8775-6-6	Criatura Editora	
2012	Un poquito tarada	976-9974-700-13-0	Planeta	
2013	Un poquito tarada	978-950-49-3789-0	Planeta Argentina	

== Discography ==
In his second record (Dramática), a collaboration with Adrián Soiza on acoustic guitar and Dani Umpi on vocals, they cover pop and rock classics, like Valeria Lynch, Ace of Base, Fun People and Pet Shop Boys.

Year	Title	Label	Comments
2006	Perfecto	Contrapedal Récords	
2009	Dramática	Contrapedal Récords	
2012	Mormazo	Contrapedal Records	
2017	Lechiguanas	Discos Crack	
2023	Guazatumba	La Banda del V.I.P.	
