= Crazy Love (1979 film) =

Este loco amor loco
- Directed by: Eva Landeck
- Written by: Eva Landeck
- Release date: 27 September 1979
- Running time: 140 minutes
- Country: Argentina
- Language: Spanish

Crazy Love or Este loco amor loco is a 1979 Argentine comedy film directed by Eva Landeck. The film was produced during the Dirty War of Argentina and was under surveillance by the National Reorganization Process.

== Cast ==
- Irene Morack
- Carlos Calvo
- Ignacio Quirós
- Héctor Gióvine
- Perla Santalla
- Osvaldo Terranova
- Hugo Arana
- Ulises Dumont
- Jorge Sassi
- Arturo Maly
- Silvina Rada
- Nelly Prono
- Rodolfo Machado
- Golde Flami
- Roberto Carnaghi
- Marzenka Novak
