= Iberoamerican Trilogy =

The Iberoamerican Trilogy is a short film trilogy directed by Uruguayan media artist Martin Sastre between the years 2002 and 2004. The films are about a future period of human civilization defined as the Iberoamerican Era when Latin America becomes the central cultural power of the World after Hollywood collapsed, until the rising of Bolivia as a confederation, taking all the Americas as its own territory.

The three films of this Trilogy are Videoart: The Iberoamerican Legend, Montevideo: The Dark Side of the Pop and Bolivia 3: Confederation Next, all shown worldwide in museums and other art spaces from countries like Argentina, Australia, Brazil, Canada, Chile, China, Cuba, France, Germany, Italy, Ireland, Switzerland, Spain, United Kingdom, United States or Uruguay.
