= Alejandro Tous =

Spanish actor (born 1976)

Alejandro García Tous (born 13 September 1976 in Alicante, Valencia, Spain) is a Spanish actor. He best known for playing Álvaro Aguilar on the popular Spanish television comedy-drama Yo soy Bea.

== Biography ==
Tous was born to parents who owned a catering service. He has a twin brother, Angel, and an older sister, Beatriz. His brother became famous for being a contestant on Big Brother.

He wanted to be a veterinarian and a firefighter before deciding to become an actor. He studied acting at a theater school in his hometown.

== Career ==
=== Film ===
- Miss Tacuarembó (2010)
- Inertes (2008)
- Spinnin': 6000 millones de personas diferentes (2007) .... Gárate
- Los fantasmas de Goya (2006)
- Habitación en alquiler (2006) .... Vidal
- Ropa ajustada (2006)
- Hable con ella (2002)
- Tiempos de Azúcar (2001)
- Son de mar (2001)
- V.O. (2001)
- Sofia (2002)

=== Television ===
- Cuestión de sexo (2009)
- Yo soy Bea (2006–2008)... Álvaro Aguilar
- Mis adorables vecinos (2006, three episodes)... Inspector
- Odiosas (2006)
- Negocios de familia
- El pasado es mañana
- Siete Vidas (Episode: La boda de mi peor amiga, 2005)
- Los Serrano (Episode: El hombre que susurraba a las frutitas, 2005)... Alfonso Enríquez
- Un paso adelante (Episode: El telegrama, 2005)... Alberto
- Lobos (Episode: Palabra de lobo, 2005)... Dani
- Hospital Central (Episode: Héroes o personas, 2004)... Fede

=== Music videos ===
- No voy a cambiar by Malú, from album Desafío (2007)
- Mil noches y una más by Gisela, from album Parte de mí (2002)
