= The Last Matinee =

2020 film directed by Maximiliano Contenti

- Theatrical release poster
- Spanish: Al morir la matinée
- Directed by: Maximiliano Contenti
- Written by: Manuel Facal; Maximiliano Contenti
- Produced by: Maximiliano Contenti; Alina Kaplan; Lucía Gaviglio Salkind
- Starring: Luciana Grasso; Ricardo Islas; Julieta Spinelli; Franco Durán
- Cinematography: Benjamín Silva
- Edited by: Santiago Bednarik
- Music by: Hernán González
- Production companies: Yukoh Films; Pensa&Rocca Cine; La Gota Cine
- Distributed by: Dark Star Pictures (North America)
- Release date: 3 September 2020 (Uruguay)
- Running time: 88 minutes
- Countries: Uruguay; Mexico; Argentina
- Language: Spanish

The Last Matinee (Spanish: Al morir la matinée), also known as Red Screening, is a 2020 Spanish-language slasher film directed by Maximiliano Contenti. An international co-production of Uruguay, Mexico and Argentina, the film stars Luciana Grasso, Ricardo Islas, Julieta Spinelli, and Franco Durán. It premiered in Uruguay in September 2020. Set in 1993 in Montevideo, an engineering student named Ana takes over the duties of her father, a projectionist at a declining movie theatre. Unbeknownst to her, the audience watching the film at the theatre is being murdered by a black-gloved killer.

== Plot ==
In 1993 in Montevideo, a man dressed in black sneaks into a declining movie theatre. As a thriller movie plays, the man in black stealthily kills an old man. The rest of the moviegoers: a trio of teenagers, a couple on a date, a boy who sneaks in, and a girl waiting for her boyfriend, remain oblivious to the murder.

The projectionist's daughter, engineering student Ana, arrives and urges him to rest and leave the job for her. After a bit of protesting, he reluctantly leaves work.

As Ana prepares to study for an exam, security guard Mauricio, visits the projector room to ask about his alarm clock. After Ana sends him away, he goes downstairs. After the ticket seller leaves, the killer murders Mauricio, then locks the theater using a metal bar. The killer tries to enter the projector room but it is already locked by Ana.

In the theater, Goni, one of the teenagers approaches the lone girl to flirt with her. As they kiss, the killer murders them by jamming the metal bar through their heads. Meanwhile, the couple prepares to leave, however, the woman Gabriela gives a hand job to her date Horacio, which prompts him to go to the men's room. The killer follows Horacio and kills him inside one of the toilet stalls. Ana finds Mauricio's alarm clock and looks for him; unable to find him, she returns to the projection room.

Goni's friends Angela and Esteban feel something is off with Goni and the girl. Angela goes down to check on him, only to find the two of them dead. Meanwhile, the killer attacks Gabriela and kills her when he stabs her in the heart with a pocket knife. Due to some technical difficulties Ana confuses the screams with complaints and restores the movie, which had stopped due to the film breaking. She eventually goes down into the theater, finding all the victims with their eyes gouged out, and is horrified. She encounters a frightened Angela, who then barely escapes the killer when she knocks him out with a fire extinguisher. They try to escape but when they find Mauricio's corpse, Ana realizes the killer has the keys. When the killer awakens he chases the boy Tomás, but he is saved by Ana, as she stabs the killer in his right eye with a shard of glass.

Ana, Angela, and Tomás take refuge inside the projection room, where Ana calls the police. However, within seconds the killer breaks through the locked door, and shows them the glass jar in which he keeps the eyes of his victims, as he chews his own severed eye in front of them. As the killer approaches them with a knife, Angela tosses a pile of tapes at him, creating a distraction that allows Tomas and Ana to escape. Angela runs through a back room and tries to escape through the roof stairs, but the killer catches her and kills her by hitting her head repeatedly with the projector, covering it with her blood. Ana comforts Tomás and takes him back to the theater. As they wait for the police, she pulls the metal bar out of the dead teenagers, and they go to the entrance, where the killer then attacks them. Ana is stabbed by the killer, and he then goes after Tomás. Although she is wounded, Ana takes the metal bar and stabs the killer through the chest from behind, killing him. He drops the glass jar and it breaks, scattering eyeballs everywhere. The police arrive at the theater, and as Ana hugs Tomás to comfort him, he stares at the victims' eyes.

== Cast ==
- Luciana Grasso as Ana
- Ricardo Islas as Asesino Come Ojos (spanish for "eye-eating killer")
- Julieta Spinelli as Angela
- Franco Durán as Tomás
- Pedro Duarte as Mauricio
- Yuly Aramburu as Maria Julia
- Hugo Blandamuro as Hugo
- Daiana Carigi as Maite
- Valeria Martínez Eguizabal as Diego's Mother
- Lucas Fressero as Boy playing
- Vladimir Knazevs as Goni
- Juan Carlos Lema as Viejo
- Fernán Moliv as Policeman
- Patricia Porzio as Gabriela
- Emanuel Sobré as Horacio

== Production ==
An international co-production film between Uruguay, Mexico and Argentina. Regarding the film's conception, Maximiliano Contenti stated that wanted to make a film that paid tribute to both Italian giallo films and American slasher films. He added: "[...] I also wanted to pay tribute to the movie theater, to the ceremony of going to see a movie in a theater, to the dark, to the mystery that projections have, which is something we may be saying goodbye to."

The film being shown in the theatre in which The Last Matinee is set is 2011's Frankenstein: Day of the Beast, directed by Ricardo Islas, who plays the killer Come Ojos in The Last Matinee.

In a workshop on "Horror and Comedy" given at Cinemateca Uruguaya at a Día de Muertos in 2022 event, an apprentice who worked with Manuel Facal and Maximiliano Contenti shared that an initial version of "The Last Matinee" would have contained humorous elements, including a spoof scene where Comes Ojos had a glass jar full of dildos rather than eyeballs.

The film takes place at the Cine Opera of Montevideo.

== Release ==
The Last Matinee premiered in Uruguay on 3 September 2020. It screened at the Sitges Film Festival that same year. It later screened at both Panic Fest and the Cleveland International Film Festival in April 2021.

On 15 April 2021, it was announced that Dark Star Pictures has acquired the North American distribution rights to the film, in collaboration with horror outfit Bloody Disgusting. The film was scheduled to be released in theatres in North America on 6 August 2021, before being released on video-on-demand, digital platforms, and DVD on 24 August. It has since been shown in the United States on channels such as Showtime and The Movie Channel.

== Awards ==
The Last Matinee won the award for the Best Ibero-American Fantastic Film at the Curtas Festival do Imaxinario 2020. It was a candidate for Best Latin American Film at the 2020 Mar del Plata International Film Festival.
