= Cinemateca Uruguaya =

Non-profit cinematheque in Uruguay

- Predecessor: Cine Universitario; Cine Club del Uruguay
- Formation: April 21, 1952; 74 years ago
- Founder: Cine Universitario: Walther Dassori Barthet; Jaime Francisco Botet; Jorge Ángel Arteaga; Selva Airaldi; Cine Club del Uruguay: Eugenio Hintz; Alberto Mántaras Rogé; José Carlos Álvarez
- Type: Cinematheque
- Region served: Uruguay
- Awards: Premio Morosoli
- Website: cinemateca.org.uy

Cinemateca Uruguaya (Uruguayan Cinematheque) is a non-profit cinematheque in Montevideo, Uruguay, established in 1952, that aims to support the cultural development of cinema, and of art in general. Since its inception, it has belonged to the International Federation of Film Archives (FIAF). It is also a founding member of the Latin American Coordinating Committee of Moving Image Archives (CLAIM), and advisory member of the Audiovisual and Film Institute of Uruguay (ICAU).

By the end of the twentieth century, its archive held 11,500 films, including over 2,000 Uruguayan works.

In 1995, Cinemateca Uruguaya received the Premio Morosoli, an Uruguayan cultural award. It was designated Cultural Heritage of the City of Montevideo. In October 1998, its importance as an educational institution was recognized by the Faculty of Humanities and Educational Science of the University of the Republic, and it was categorized as an educational and cultural institution by the Ministry of Education and Culture of Uruguay. Its film archive was declared a national historic monument by the Heritage Commission and the ICAU, and its activities were declared of departmental and cultural interest to the city of Montevideo.

== Areas of activity ==
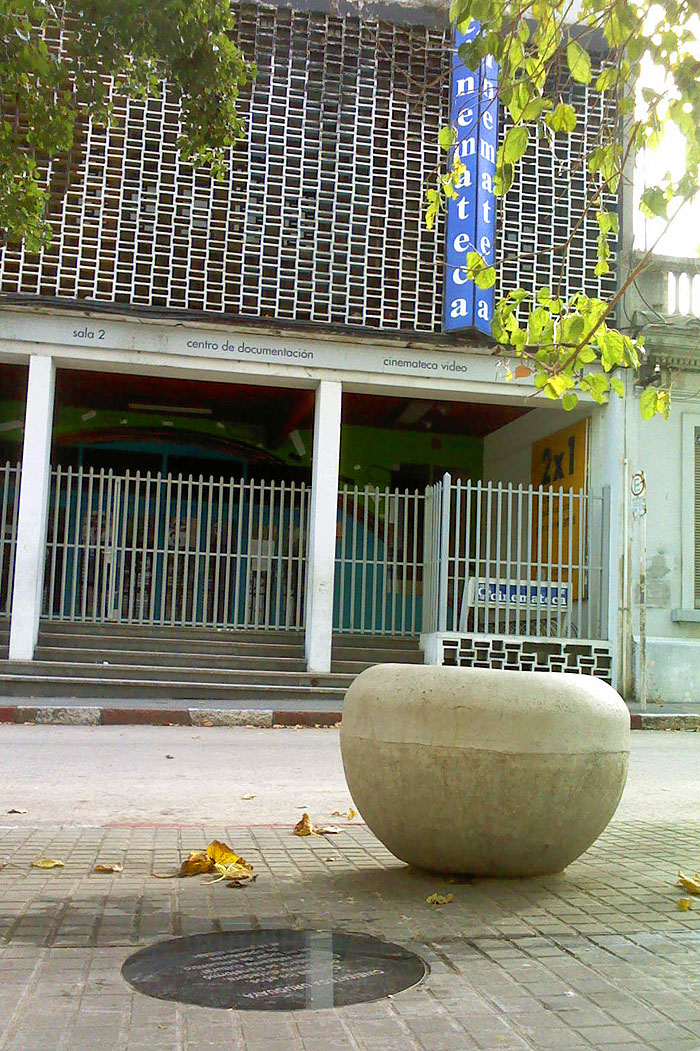
Previous headquarters of Cinemateca Uruguaya

Its areas of activity include:

- Film Preservation. Facilities in the outskirts of Montevideo store archived materials at optimal temperature and humidity.
- School of Cinema. Offers grade school, post graduate, and extracurricular courses.
- Cinemas. Four venues in Montevideo: Cinemateca 18, Sala Pocitos Hall, Sala Cinemateca and Sala 2.
- Cinematographic Documentation Center. Includes collections of books, magazines and journals, newspaper articles, photos, posters, and other media.

Cinemateca Uruguaya also organizes the International Cinema Festival of Uruguay, which in 2018 marked its 36th year.

== Gallery ==
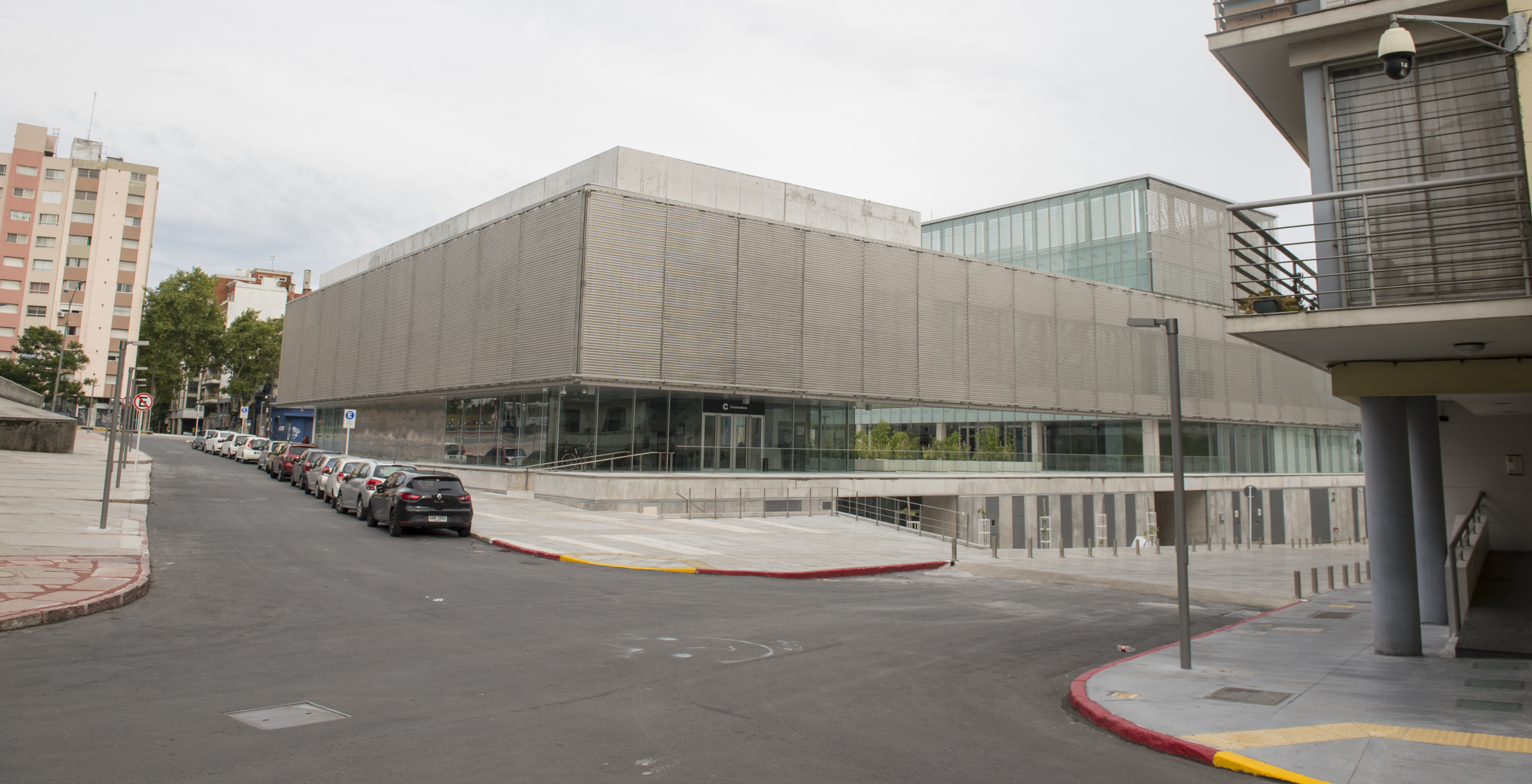
New headquarters of Cinemateca Uruguaya and CAF – Development Bank of Latin America and the Caribbean

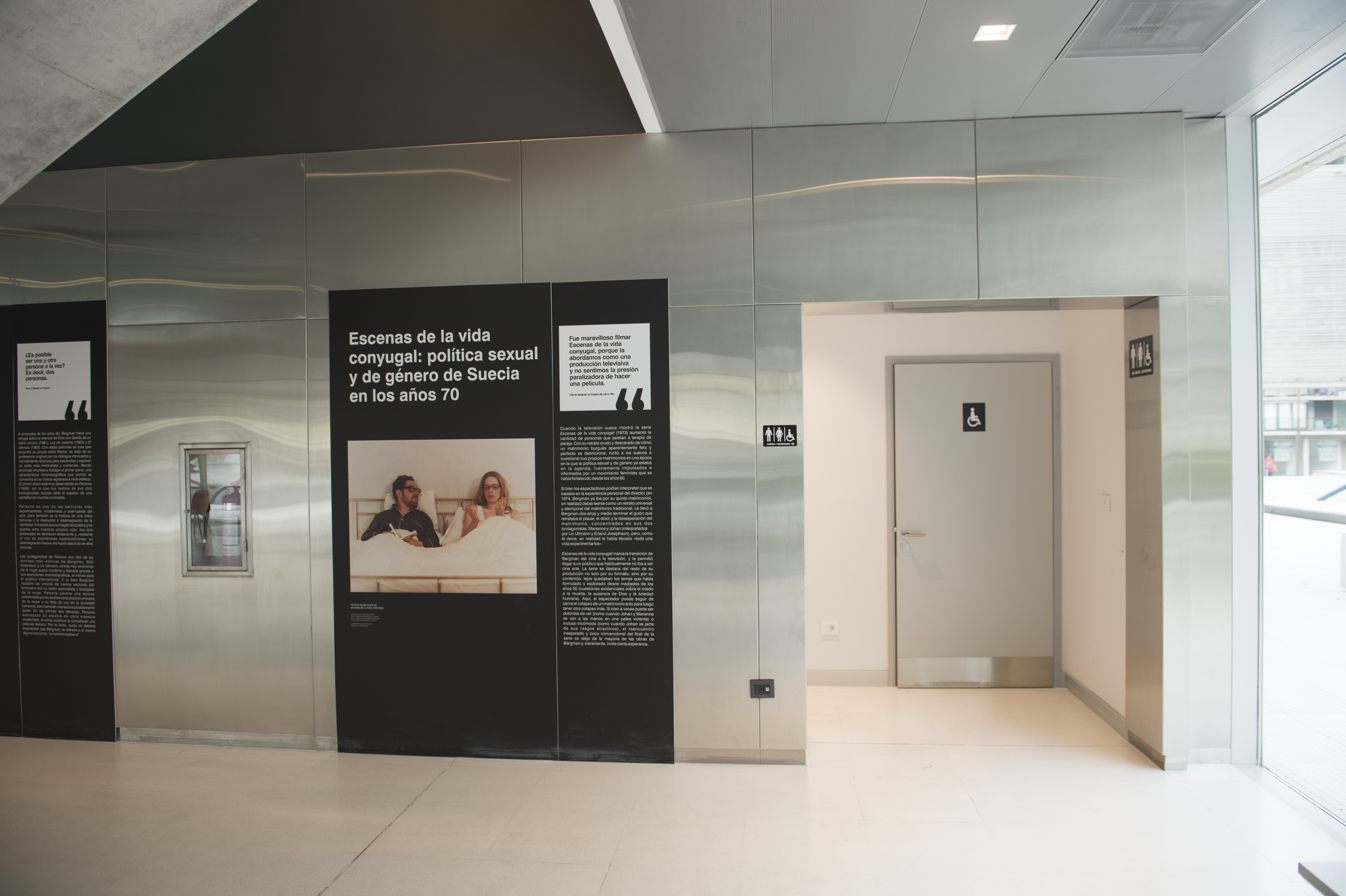
Exhibition inside the building.

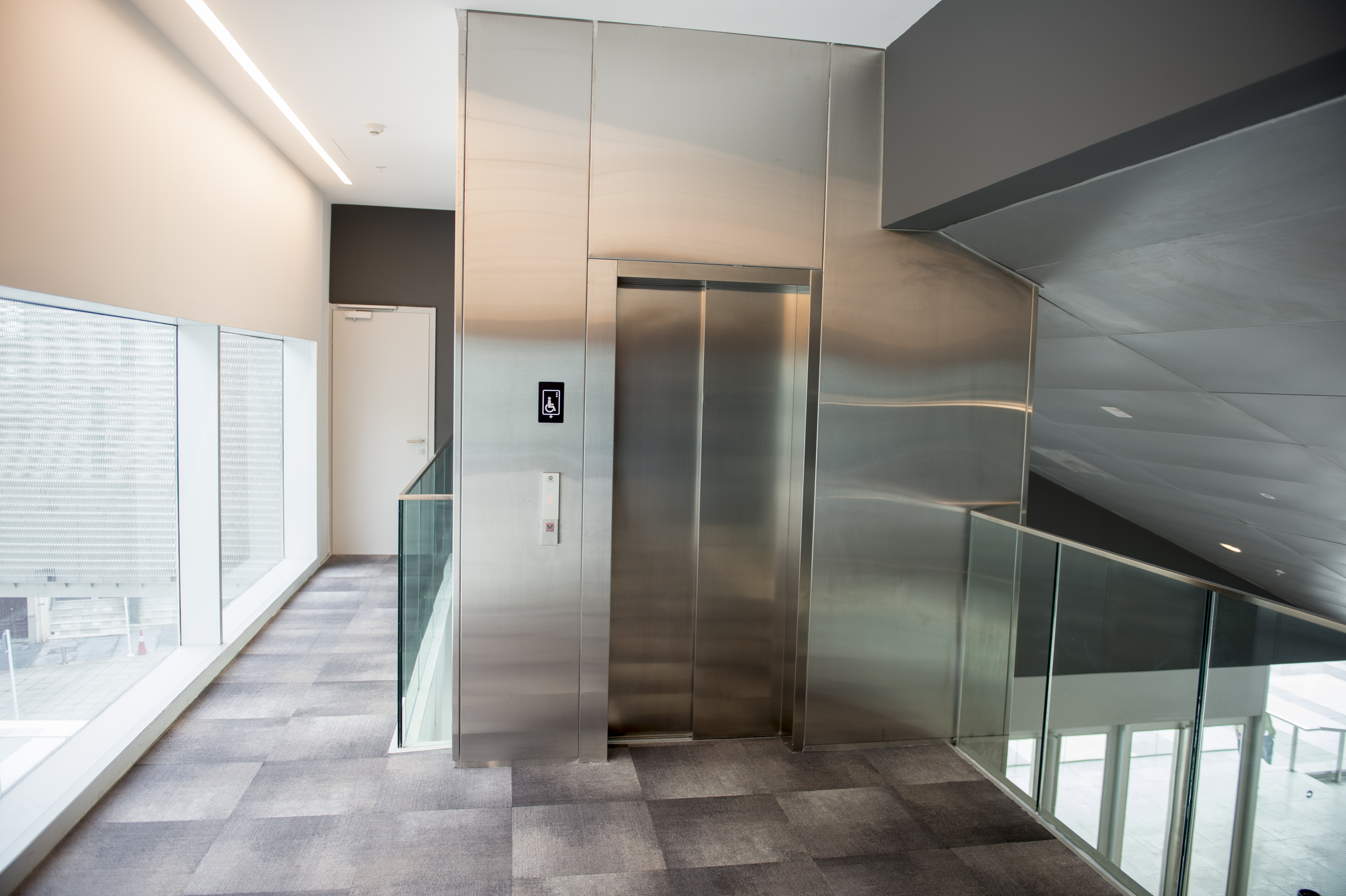
Interior and accessibility services.

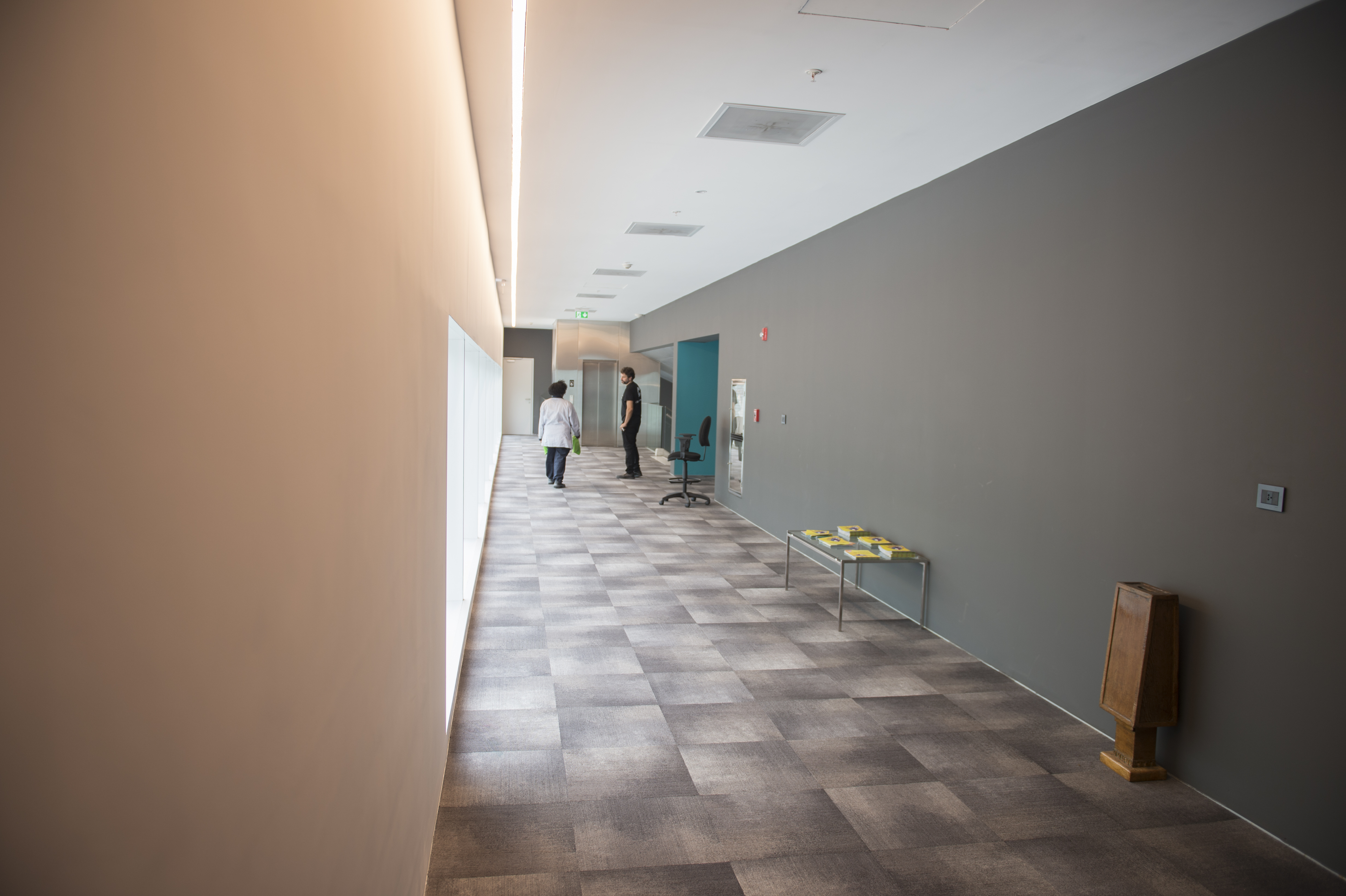
Interior and hallways to cinema rooms

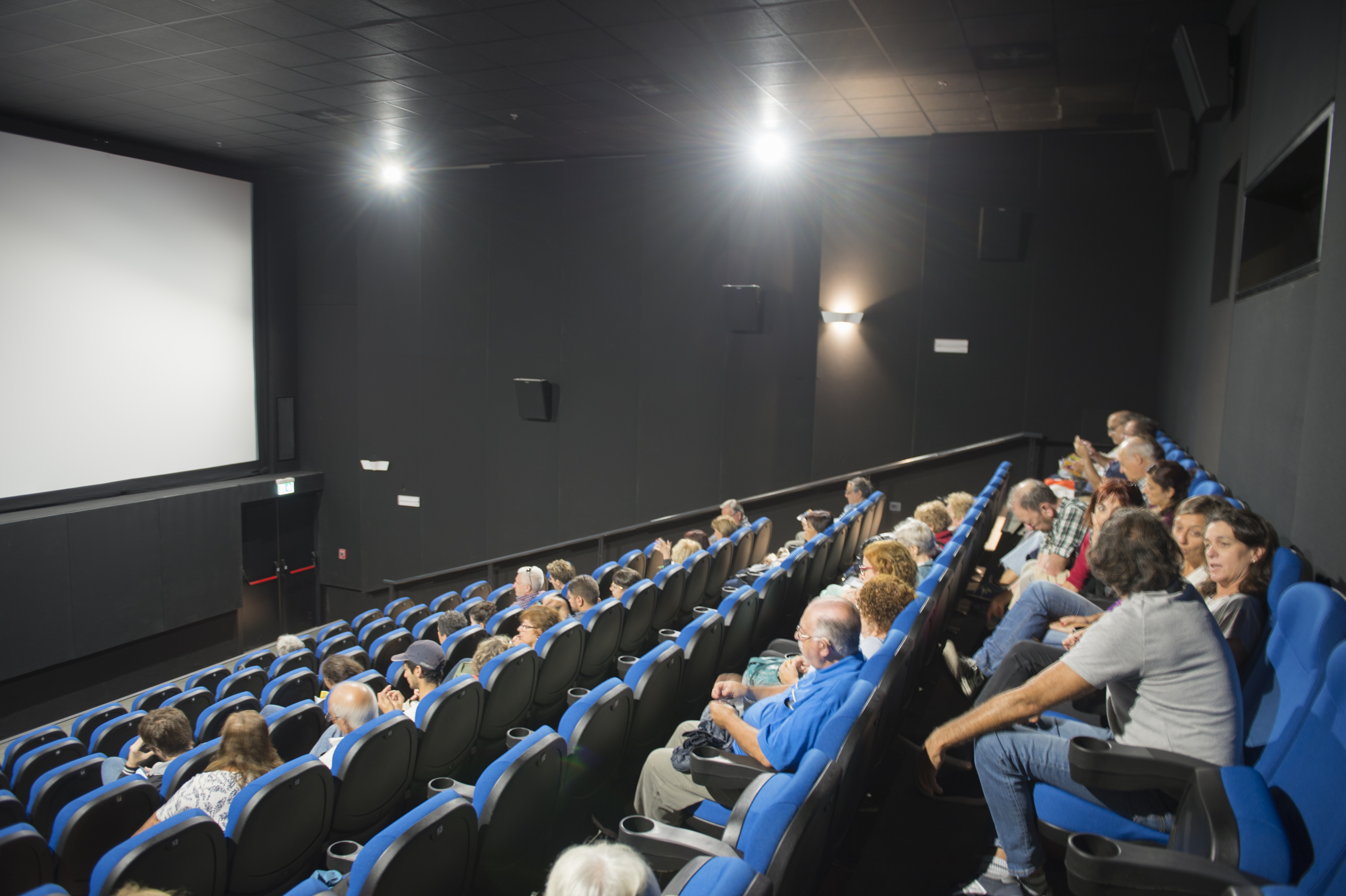
One of the cinema rooms.

== See also ==
- Cinema of Uruguay
- List of film archives
- Cinematheque
