= The Silent House (2010 film) =

- Theatrical release poster
- Directed by: Gustavo Hernández
- Written by: Oscar Estévez
- Produced by: Gustavo Rojo
- Starring: Florencia Colucci; Abel Tripaldi; Gustavo Alonso; María Salazar
- Cinematography: Pedro Luque
- Music by: Hernán González
- Release date: 16 May 2010 (Cannes)
- Running time: 86 minutes
- Country: Uruguay
- Language: Spanish
- Budget: 6,000 USD

The Silent House (Spanish: La Casa Muda) is a 2010 Uruguayan horror film directed by Gustavo Hernández. The film is supposedly inspired by real events that took place in the 1940s, but no information can be found to authenticate the aforementioned claims. A small-budget film originally intended for local audiences, it has achieved success in several important international film festivals such as the Cannes Film Festival (where it was shown at Director's Fortnight). At the 2011 Sundance Film Festival, Chris Kentis and Laura Lau presented an English-language remake titled Silent House, starring Elizabeth Olsen.

== Plot ==
Laura and her father Wilson arrive at a cottage in a secluded area to repair it. The owner, Nestor, will put the house on sale. He tells them that the second level is unstable and it is unsafe to go upstairs. They intend to spend the night in the house. Because the windows are nailed shut, the house's interior is dark even during the day.

Laura finds a radio playing a haunting melody, which she turns off. Shortly after, her father goes upstairs to check a noise and Laura hears what appears to be a scuffle. Moments later, she finds her father restrained and murdered downstairs. She cries and hugs his body, getting his blood on herself in the process.

Laura attempts to flee but someone has locked the doors. Armed with a reap hook and a lamp, she stumbles through the house in order to find a way outside. She notices that her father's dead body has been moved into the chair and that someone has placed a puppet on him. Another melody plays, this time from the upper floor. She goes upstairs and turns off another radio. She hears footsteps and hides. An unknown person with a knife and lamp enters the room, then leaves. Laura finds the key to the front door and escapes the house.

After manically running, she stops on the road. Her pursuer approaches but disappears when Laura is almost run over by Nestor. She tells Nestor about the attack but the latter is unconvinced. They search the house and Nestor disappears. Laura's lamp shuts off so she uses an old Polaroid camera to light the room through the camera's flash each time she takes a photo. In the photos, she sees a little girl in a white dress and a young man trying to stab her.

She flees to the next room, where she discovers many photos on a wall and in a baby buggy. They mainly show Nestor and a woman in underwear. She then finds Nestor restrained and injured downstairs. They kiss each other and have a conversation: Nestor tells Laura that he loves her and only called her father in order to see her. Laura mentions his pictures and asks: "Do you miss her? Do you want to tell her something? She is here now." In a mirror, the little girl is visible, appearing to be in the room. During the conversation, Laura becomes more and more aggressive until she finally shouts and says, "You two killed my baby. You're going to die in the manner that my father did."

She sits Nestor in the chair after removing her father's corpse, puts the mysterious puppet on him, and kills him with her reap hook. The ending credits show photos of the past with Laura, Nestor and her father. The film continues, showing Laura burning the pictures and walking through the forest.

== Cast ==
- Florencia Colucci as Laura
- Abel Tripaldi as Néstor
- Gustavo Alonso as Wilson
- María Paz Salazar as Niña

== Production ==
La Casa Muda was shot to look like it was in real time in one continuous 88 minute take. Its claims that it is one of only a handful of theatrically released movies to be shot in a continuous long take, and that it is the first ever single-take horror film, are contentious, as the camera used, the Canon EOS 5D Mark II, can only film up to 30 minutes of continuous footage. With a budget of just six thousand dollars, it was filmed using a handheld high-definition digital single-lens reflex camera (the Canon EOS 5D Mark II) over a time period of just four days.

== Release and reception ==
The film premiered at the Cannes Film Festival on 16 May 2010, a Director's Fortnight selection. That summer and fall it was screened on the festival circuit at the Melbourne International Film Festival, Sitges Film Festival, and the Stockholm International Film Festival. Its first theatrical release began on 27 January 2011 in Argentina. This was followed by a 4 March release in Uruguay, where it was produced. It received mixed reviews after its 8 April 2011 release in the UK, with critics generally praising the director's technical achievements, but finding the overall story line unimpressive. Peter Bradshaw of The Guardian praised the film, writing: "This is a smart, scary film and a technical tour de force with its own skin-crawling atmosphere of fear."

The film was selected as the Uruguayan entry for the Best Foreign Language Film at the 84th Academy Awards, but it did not make the final shortlist.

Project Deadpost website gave the film a score of 90% calling it an "ultra-low budget, brilliant, scary little film from Uruguay that outdoes many big budget contenders". The Silent House currently has 68% on review aggregator Rotten Tomatoes with its consensus stating, "Shot in a single take, The Silent House may be a gimmick movie but it's one that's enough to sustain dread and tension throughout".

== See also ==
- List of films featuring home invasions
- List of submissions to the 84th Academy Awards for Best Foreign Language Film
- List of Uruguayan submissions for the Academy Award for Best Foreign Language Film
