= Cinemaissí =

Film festival in Helsinki, Finland

Cinemaissí is a film festival specialized in Latin American and Caribbean film, organized in Helsinki, Finland, each October. The first Cinemaissí was held in 2005. Since 2008, a children's happening, Cinemaissíto, is organized on the side of the festival. The festival is organized by the association Cinemaissí ry.

In 2011 41 films from 14 countries were screened at Cinemaissí and the festival attracted 3200 spectators.
