= Get the Weed =

- Uruguayan theatrical release poster
- Directed by: Denny Brechner; Alfonso Guerrero; Marcos Hecht
- Written by: Denny Brechner; Alfonso Guerrero; Marcos Hecht
- Produced by: Denny Brechner; Alfonso Guerrero; Marcos Hecht
- Starring: Denny Brechner; Talma Friedler; Gustavo Olmos
- Edited by: Duane Rios
- Production companies: Loro Films; Pardelion Films
- Release dates: September 7, 2017 (Uruguay); February 4, 2018 (SBIFF); August 30, 2018 (Argentina)
- Running time: 75 minutes
- Countries: Uruguay; United States
- Languages: English; Spanish

Get the Weed (Spanish: Misión no oficial, lit. 'Unofficial mission'; also known as Traigan el porro, lit. 'Bring the marijuana', in Argentina and Traigan la hierba, lit. 'Bring the weed', in Spain) is a 2017 mockumentary film written, directed and produced by Denny Brechner, Alfonso Guerrero and Marcos Hecht. It stars Brechnner, Talma Friedler and Gustavo Olmos. The film follows three false agents who travel to the United States with the aim of supplying marijuana to Uruguay.

== Synopsis ==
Three false agents belonging to the Uruguayan Chamber of Legal Marijuana travel to the United States to obtain 50 tons of cannabis with the aim of supplying the country.

== Cast ==
The actors participating in this film are:

- Denny Brechner as Alfredo Rodríguez
- Talma Friedler
- Gustavo Olmos
- José Mujica as Himself
- Ignacio Roqueta
- Barack Obama as Himself
- Sean Penn as Himself
- Steven Tyler as Himself

== Release ==
It premiered on September 7, 2017, in Uruguayan theaters. It had its premiere in the United States on February 4, 2018, at the Santa Bárbara International Film Festival, and then premiered on August 30, 2018, in Argentine theaters.

== Accolades ==
Year	Award / Festival	Category	Recipient	Result	Ref.
2018	Santa Bárbara International Film Festival	Jury Special Mention – Feature Film	Get the Weed	Won	
2018	Málaga Film Festival	Best Film – Audience Award	Get the Weed	Won	
