= Edmundo Bianchi =

Uruguayan writer and anarchist

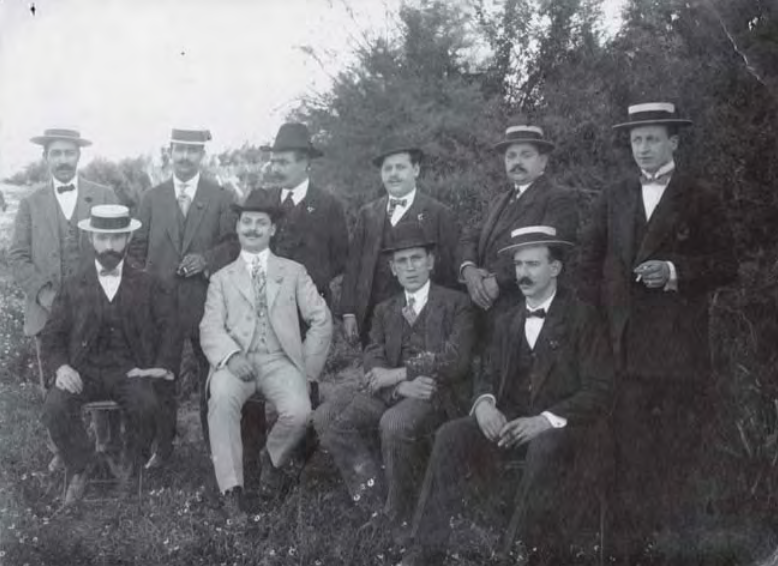
Bianchi (seated, first on the right), with the tailors' union, in 1904

Edmundo Bianchi (1880 – 1965) was a Uruguayan anarchist, writer, dramatist, poet, essayist, and tango lyricist. Bianchi was a founding member of the Asociación General de Autores del Uruguay (the General Association of Uruguayan Authors).

== Biography ==
Bianchi was born in Montevideo on 22 November 1880. Along with Pascual Guaglianone, Julián Basterra, Belén Sárraga, Ángel Falco, and José Peyrot he was a founding member of the 20th century anarchist movement in Uruguay. He worked with Florencio Sánchez at the International Center for Social Studies (Centro Internacional de Estudios Sociales), events were held here for workers, anarchists, and intellectuals. Bianchi was active as a dramatist, poet, and essayist. He wrote the lyrics for two tangos: "Pampero" and "Ya no Cantas Chingolo", the latter was performed by Carlos Gardel in Europe. He died in Montevideo on 29 November 1965 at the age of 85.

== Activity as a journalist and in the anarchist movement ==
Bianchi took part in the Uruguayan anarchist movement in his youth. He was outspoken on social issues in his journalistic writings. He edited the newspaper El Trabajo (1901), and joined the magazine Futuro as its founder and director with Emilio Frugoni, Carlos Zum Felde, Ítalo Perrotti, José Ingenieros, and Julio C. Barcos. He worked as a journalist at El Siglo and La Razón, and directed the magazine Bohemia (1908–1910).

In his writing, he denounced the upper classes of Montevideo. He took part in literary gatherings that took place at the Café El Polo Bamba near Plaza Independencia on Calle Colonia between Ciudadela and Florida. Florencio Sánchez, Emilio Frugoni, Horacio Quiroga, Ernesto Herrera, Roberto de las Carreras were among other frequenters of the café.

== Positions held ==
Bianchi worked in the Ministry of the Interior, and at the Internal Revenue Directorate. He worked as the cultural attaché at the Uruguayan embassy in Argentina. Bianchi also served on the National Theatre Board and National Copyright Council. He was the president of the General Association of Uruguayan Authors.

== Selected works ==
Theatrical works

- La Quiebra (premiered at the Teatro Solís, in Montevideo in 1910)
- Orgullo de pobre (1912)
- Perdidos en la Luz (premiered in Buenos Aires in 1913)
- La senda oscura (1932)

Musical comedies

- Los Sobrevivientes (1939)
- El hombre Absurdo
- El oro de los Mártires
- Sinfonía de los Héroes (1940)
- De América a las Trincheras
- Mamita
- El mago de Nueva Pompeya

Tango lyrics

- Pampero
- Ya no Cantas Chingolo
