= Carrera de bicicletas en el velódromo de Arroyo Seco =

Film by Félix Oliver

Carrera de bicicletas en el velódromo de Arroyo Seco

"Carrera de bicicletas en el velódromo de Arroyo Seco" (English: "Bicycle Race at the Arroyo Seco Cycle Track") is a documentary short produced by director Félix Oliver. It is considered the first Uruguayan film. The only known copy is preserved in the archives of Cinemateca Uruguaya.

== Plot ==
The film portrays a cycling race at the Arroyo Seco velodrome, formerly located in Agraciada. The film shows four cyclists rounding the track while the audience claps. At one point, two women attempt to cross the track, but are forced back into the audience by the oncoming bicycles. The two women are finally able to reach the center of the track and two men standing in the center cross into the stands to join the audience.

== Production ==
The film lasts four minutes. It was directed by Catalan ship owner Félix Oliver, who had purchased a camera, a projector and rolls of film in Europe. Most experts believe that "Carrerra" was filmed in 1898, but Juan Pablo Lepra has conjectured that the film was shot between October 1901 and the beginning of 1903, due to several sources that mention the velodrome was operational between these dates. The film forms part of a ten-film body of work by Oliver, the first films produced in Uruguay. Oliver was also the first person to exhibit films in the country. After its initial exhibitions by Oliver, "Carrerra" was not exhibited publicly until 1975.
