= Florencia Colucci =

Florencia Colucci Long
- Born: November 3, 1986 (age 39); Montevideo, Uruguay
- Occupations: Actress, Cinema Uruguay director
- Known for: The Silent House

Florencia Colucci Long (Montevideo; November 3, 1986) is an actress and director of Cinema Uruguay.

For her acting work she has won: the ICAU award (Film Critics Association of Uruguay) for "Best Actress"; "Actress" in 2011 for her work on The Silent House; Award "Woman of the Year" 2011 (awarded annually by the mayor of Tarariras, Colonia, Uruguay); Award "Woman of the Year" (in its twelfth edition, Uruguay) 2012 in the category "acting in film or TV"; Iris Award for "Best actress in film" 2012 for her performance in The Silent House. It has also obtained a "spatial reference" in the FICU festival for the realization of her animated short Macaco.

In 2014, Portrait of Animal Behavior was released, a film where she directed, wrote, produced and starred together with Gonzalo Lugo, being their directorial debuts.
