= Portrait of Animal Behavior =

- Theatrical release poster
- Directed by: Florencia Colucci; Gonzalo Lugo
- Written by: Florencia Colucci; Gonzalo Lugo
- Produced by: Florencia Colucci; Gonzalo Lugo
- Starring: Florencia Colucci; Gonzalo Lugo
- Cinematography: Francisco Jaso
- Music by: Alejandro Perego
- Production companies: Opiti Films; Shoreline Entertainment
- Distributed by: Buen Cine
- Release dates: August 20, 2014 (World Cinema Amsterdam Festival); September 17, 2015 (Uruguay)
- Running time: 84 minutes
- Country: Uruguay
- Language: Spanish
- Budget: $66.000

Portrait of Animal Behavior (Spanish: Retrato de un comportamiento animal) is a 2014 Uruguayan romantic comedy road movie written, directed, produced and starred by Florencia Colucci and Gonzalo Lugo in their directorial debut.

== Synopsis ==
Matto is a marine biologist who is obsessed with meeting dolphins and Martina is hitchhiking to Bahia to investigate Tropicalia and herself. He travels in his own car, meets her and takes her, arriving on the shores of Florianópolis in Brazil, where most of the film takes place.

== Cast ==
- Florencia Colucci as Martina
- Gonzalo Lugo as Matto
- Rocío Piferrer
- Jorge Bolani

== Production ==
Principal photography began in December 2012 in Rocha, Uruguay and Florianópolis, Brazil.

== Release ==
It had its world premiere on August 20, 2014, at the World Cinema Amsterdam Festival, the Netherlands. It was commercially released on September 17, 2015, in Uruguayan theaters.

== Reception ==
=== Box-office ===
Portrait of Animal Behavior drew 131 viewers in its first week in theaters, ranking 23rd.

=== Accolades ===
Year	Award / Festival	Category	Recipient	Result	Ref.
2015	José Ignacio International Film Festival	Best Film	Portrait of Animal Behavior	Nominated	
