= Eva Landeck =

Argentine film director

Eva Fainsilber Landeck, better known as Eva Landeck (Buenos Aires, 1922 - 12 June 2019) was an Argentine film director and screenwriter.

== Filmography ==
- Barrios y teatros de Buenos Aires (short film) (1963)
- Las ruinas de Pompeya (short film) (1965)
- Domingos de Hyde Park (short film) (1965)
- Horas extras (short film) (1966)
- Entremés (short film) (1966)
- El empleo (short film) (1970)
- Gente en Buenos Aires (1974)
- El lugar del humo (1979)
- Este loco amor loco (1979)
