= Valeria Puig =

Valeria Puig (born May 28, 1988) is a Uruguayan film director.

== Family life ==
Valeria was born in Montevideo, Uruguay.

== Films ==
Year	Film	Writer	Director	Producer	Role
2014	The World Behind a Glass	x	x	x	
2012	White Collar Hooligans 2: England Away				Production Manager and 2nd AD
2011	Run				Script Editor
2011	Confessions of a Taxi Driver	x	x	x	Director, Writer and Producer
2010	Male Mode				Still Photographer and Editor.
2010	How to Become a Criminal Mastermind				Production Coordinator and 2nd AD
2010	Freefalling		x	x	Script Editor and Story Consultant
2009	Domino				Director of Photography
2009	The Cube	x		Co-Producer	Camera Operator
2009	Figlio di			x	Involved in pre-production
2009	Dario Fo				Co-Editor
2009	G in Key Major	Co-Writer	Co-Director	Co-Producer	
2009	Funk & Angel				Script Editor and Story Consultant
2008	The Lines of the Road	x	x	x	Camera Operator
2008	Mic & Rob	Co-Writer			Co-Animator
2007	Punta del Este				Script Editor and Story Consultant
