= The Door Is There =

- Uruguayan theatrical release poster
- Directed by: Facundo Ponce de León; Juan Ponce de León
- Written by: Facundo Ponce de León; Juan Ponce de León
- Produced by: Lucila Bortagaray; Ramón Cardini
- Cinematography: Facundo Ponce de León; Juan Ponce de León
- Edited by: Guillermo Madeiro; Juan Ponce de León
- Music by: Luciano Supervielle
- Production companies: Mueca Films; A Contracorriente Films
- Distributed by: A Contracorriente Films (Spain)
- Release dates: March 12, 2023 (Málaga); November 1, 2023 (Spain); August 8, 2024 (Uruguay)
- Running time: 79 minutes
- Countries: Uruguay; Spain
- Language: Spanish

The Door Is There (Spanish: Hay una puerta ahí) is a 2023 documentary film written and directed by Facundo Ponce de León and Juan Ponce de León in their respective feature directorial debuts. The film is about the friendship between Dr. Enric Benito and his patient Fernando Sureda, who seeks an early death.

It was selected as the Uruguayan entry for the Best International Feature Film at the 97th Academy Awards.

== Synopsis ==
The relationship between Enric Benito and Fernando Sureda, separated by an ocean, is built from virtual talks during the pandemic. Their conversations revolve around the acceptance of pain, commitment to those closest to them, and a sense of humor. Enric is a specialist in oncology and honorary member of the Spanish Society of Palliative Care. Fernando is a former director of the Uruguayan Football Association, who suffers from ALS. The first accompanied the second and also his entourage on his last trip. The second managed to open a debate on euthanasia in his country.

== Release ==
It had its world premiere on March 12, 2023, at the 26th Málaga Film Festival, then screened on September 29, 2023, at the 71st San Sebastián International Film Festival, on December 8, 2023, at the 44th Havana Film Festival and on March 21, 2024, at the 42nd Uruguay International Film Festival. It was commercially released on November 1, 2023, in Spanish theaters and on August 8, 2024, in Uruguayan theaters.

== Accolades ==
Year	Award	Category	Recipient	Result	Ref.
2024	79th CEC Awards	Best Documentary	The Door Is There	Nominated	

== See also ==
- List of submissions to the 97th Academy Awards for Best International Feature Film
- List of Uruguayan submissions for the Academy Award for Best International Feature Film
