= Diana: The Rose Conspiracy =

2005 film by Martín Sastre

Diana, The Rose Conspiracy is a 2005 short film directed by Uruguayan media artist Martin Sastre. It depicts a day when the world discovers that Diana, Princess of Wales, did not die in Paris and has a new undercover life in a dangerous cantegril on the outskirts of Montevideo, Uruguay. The film was shot in a real Uruguayan slum along with other parts of Montevideo. It stars a Diana impersonator, an English teacher from São Paulo named Denise Watson. It was selected as one of the best works by the Italian Art Critics Association at the Venice Biennale. After the first public screening the film provoked false media headlines about Diana being alive in Uruguay. This film can only be seen in museums such as the Solomon R. Guggenheim Museum in New York City, private collections and other art spaces.
