= Stay Still =

Quédate quieto
- Promotional release poster
- Directed by: Joanna Lombardi
- Written by: Joanna Lombardi
- Produced by: Enid Campos; Juan Castro de Jong; Hernán Musaluppi
- Starring: Hilton Gratelly; Hilda Curo; María Cristina Pérez
- Cinematography: Micaela Cajahuaringa
- Edited by: Eric Williams
- Production companies: El Árbol Azul; Cimarrón Cine; Latin Quarter
- Distributed by: Latin Quarter
- Release date: March 6, 2024 (Málaga)
- Running time: 76 minutes
- Countries: Peru; Uruguay; Netherlands
- Language: Spanish

Stay Still (Spanish: Quédate quieto) is a 2024 docufiction film written and directed by Joanna Lombardi. It follows two young women who invade a piece of land in Pachacútec because they want a house of their own so they must stay there quietly, while a gravedigger is worried about their presence because he will not be able to continue digging graves.

== Synopsis ==
Hilton is a gravedigger in an illegal cemetery, he arrived as an invader twelve years ago. In turn, Hilda and Cristina walk through the cemetery, they have been told that a new settlement will begin nearby, they are young and want to have their own house by carrying out an invasion. They must trace with sand the place where they want to live and try not to move so that no one steals it. Their actions cause concern for Hilton because they will not be able to dig more graves if they occupy that portion of land.

== Cast ==
- Hilton Gratelly as Hilton
- Hilda Curo as Hilda
- María Cristina Pérez as Cristina
- Melvin Quijada as Serenazgo
- Roxana Herrera

== Production ==
Principal photography took place on weekends between 2019 and 2022 in Peru.

== Release ==
Stay Still had its world premiere on March 6, 2024, at the 27th Málaga Film Festival, then screened on June 10, 2024, at the 39th Guadalajara International Film Festival, on August 10, 2024, at the 28th Lima Film Festival, and on November 10, 2024, at the 10th University of Lima Film Week.

== Accolades ==
Year	Award / Festival	Category	Recipient	Result	Ref.
2024	27th Málaga Film Festival	Best Documentary	Stay Still	Nominated	
2024	39th Guadalajara International Film Festival	Best Ibero-American Documentary Feature Film	Stay Still	Nominated	
