= Martín Sastre =

Uruguayan film director and contemporary media artist

Martin Sastre
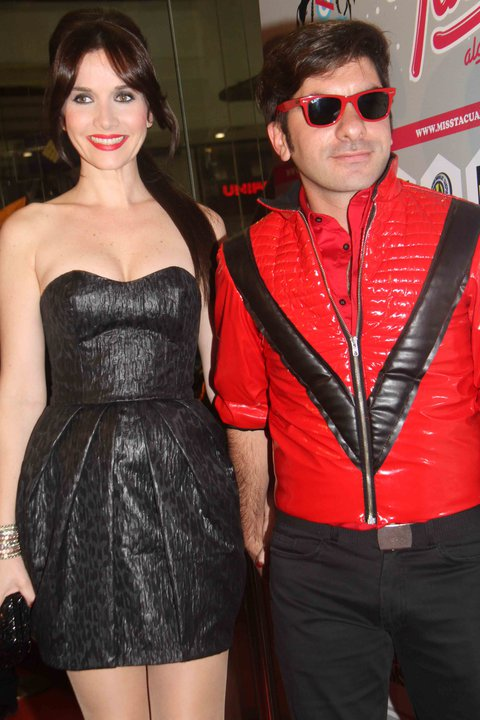
- Sastre (right) and Natalia Oreiro (left) during the première of Miss Tacuarembo in Montevideo, in 2010
- Born: Martin Sastre Malaneschii; 13 February 1976 (age 50); Montevideo, Uruguay
- Occupations: Artist, Filmmaker
- Website: http://www.martinsastre.com

Martín Sastre (born February 13, 1976) is a Uruguayan film director and contemporary media artist working with film, video, sculpture, photography and drawing.

== Life and career ==
Sastre was born in Montevideo, Uruguay, and started to study cinema at the early age of 8. He is the eldest brother of three children, a sister Maria Eugenia and brother Federico, among other members of his family, are regularly featuring in his early artwork.

In 2002 he moved to Madrid, granted by Fundación Carolina of the government of Spain. One of his best-known early video-works is the Iberoamerican Trilogy formed by Videoart: The Iberoamerican Legend, Montevideo: The Dark Side of the Pop and Bolivia 3: Confederation Next.

In 2003 Sastre set up the Martin Sastre Foundation for the Super Poor Art with the slogan, "Adopt a Latin American Artist". The Foundation has at its heart the opportunity to sponsor artists from the periphery who normally do not have the economic means to access international circuits.

In 2004 he won the First Prize for Young Artist at Madrid's highly prestigious ARCO Art Fair by the Madrid City Council. This same year his work Bolivia 3: Confederation Next, where a cartoon version of Sastre fights U.S. Artist Matthew Barney, was selected for the National representation of Uruguay in the São Paulo Biennial.

In 2005 his short film Diana: The Rose Conspiracy was released during the Venice Biennial where the artist claims to have found Diana, Princess of Wales alive in Montevideo. This same year, the Martin Sastre Foundation brought three German artists from the Bauhaus University in Weimar to Montevideo with his program "Be a Latin American Artist".

In 2008 he won the Faena Prize for an Urban video- intervention in Buenos Aires, Argentina featuring Latin American Sex symbol from the 60's Mrs Isabel Sarli, also this year the production of his first feature film was announced, a movie entitled Miss Tacuarembó starred by Natalia Oreiro and Rossy de Palma.

In 2011 receives the ALMA Award for best Script and the Best Film Biznaga Award for his first feature film at the Zonazine Malaga Spanish Film Festival.

Sastre is a vegetarian, his favorite drink is Fanta Light.

=== U from Uruguay ===
U From Uruguay, also known as "Pepe's perfume", is a conceptual piece featuring a perfume made by the artist with the essences extracted from the flowers grown by the President of Uruguay, José Mujica. From the funds risen by the perfume, 90% will be destinated to the creation of a fund to support Latin American artists.

The fragrance was made a few months after, the artist collected, together with the president chrysanthemums and wild native Uruguayan herbs in the farm "Rincón del Cerro" home of the president and his wife.

Only three bottles of this fragrance "U From Uruguay" have been produced, the only bottle for sale was auctioned on 31 May 2013 during the opening of the IILA (Instituto Italo-Latinoamericano) pavilion, within the framework of the 55th Venice Biennial

"U From Uruguay" was finally acquired for 50,000 dollars turning the 33-millilitre bottle of "U from Uruguay" the world's most expensive perfume fragrance, overcoming the Imperial Majesty created in 1872 at the request of Queen Victoria of the United Kingdom valued at $1,400 per millilitre.

== Filmography ==
- Nasha Natasha, 2020
- Protocolo Celeste, 2014
- U from Uruguay, 2012
- Miss Tacuarembó, 2010
- Diana: The Rose Conspiracy, 2005

== Quotes ==
"Hello Kitty is the Mona Lisa of the Future". Martin Sastre

== Videography ==
- 2000 Heidiboy Channel
- 2001 Masturbated Virgin I, Masturbated Virgin II, Sor Kitty: The Missionary Nun
- 2002 Videoart: The Iberoamerican Legend, The Iberoamerican Videoart Awards
- 2003 The Martin Sastre Foundation, Nadia walks with me
- 2004 Montevideo: The Dark Side of the Pop, La Mano en el Fuego, Bolivia 3: Confederation Next
- 2005 Diana: The Rose Conspiracy
- 2006 Freaky Birthday
- 2007 Lala meets Barney
- 2008 Madonna meets Sor Kitty (Latins do it Better)

== Exhibitions (solo) ==
- Aura, Gallerie Filles du Calvaire, Paris, France 2006
- Hola Australia!, Art Space, Sydney, Australia, 2005
- The Iberoamerican Trilogy RMIT, Royal Melbourne Institute of Technology Melbourne, Australia, 2005
- Fantastic Leme Gallery São Paulo, Brazil, 2005
- Martin Sastre American As Well, Stills Gallery, Edinburgh, Scotland, 2005
- The Iberoamerican Trilogy, Art In general New York, United States, 2005
- The Iberoamerican Trilogy, MAC Museo de Arte Contemporáneo de Santiago y Metro Quinta Normal, Santiago de Chile, Chile, 2005
- Martin Sastre American As Well, Site Gallery, Sheffield, England, 2004
- Planet Sastre/ Buenos Aires Galería Ruth Benzacar, Buenos Aires, Argentina, 2003
- Planet Sastre, Casa de América Madrid, Spain, 2002

== Exhibitions (group) ==
- 12 Contemporary Experimental Images, Shanghai DUOLUN Museum of Modern Art, Shanghai, China, 2006
- En las Fronteras, Museo d'Arte Contemporánea, Genova, Italy, 2006
- 11 BIM Bienal de l'Image en Mouvement, Centre pour l'image contemporaine, Sain Gervais, Genevra, Switzerland, 2005
- The Hours, Irish Museum of Modern Art, Dublin, Ireland, 2005
- Emergencias, MUSAC, Museo de Arte Contemporáneo de Castilla y León, León, Spain, 2005
- XXVI Bienal Internacional de São Paulo, 'Representación Nacional de Uruguay São Paulo, Brazil, 2004
- Playlist, Palis de Tokyo Paris, France, 2004
- Video X, Momenta Art, New York, United States, 2004
- Superyo, MALBA Museo de Arte Latinoamericano de Buenos Aires, Buenos Aires, Argentina, 2004
- VIII Bienal de la Habana, La Havana, Cuba, 2003
- I Bienal Internacional de Praga, Prague, Czech Republic, 2003
- You think I'm Superficial, Palm Beach Institute of Contemporary Art, Miami, United States, 2002
- El Final del Eclipse, Fundación Telefónica, Madrid, Spain, 2001
- III Bienal del MERCOSUR Porto Alegre, Brazil, 2001
- Big Quisiera ser grande, Momenta Art, New York, United States, 2000
