= Carmen Vidal Female Detective =

- Theatrical release poster
- Directed by: Eva Dans
- Written by: Eva Dans
- Produced by: Alina Kaplan; Eva Dans
- Starring: Eva Dans
- Cinematography: Germán Nocella; Victoria Pena
- Edited by: Manuel Rilla
- Music by: Maximiliano Silveira
- Production companies: Anfibia Cine; EVACORP; Intergalactic RQM
- Release dates: November 5, 2020 (Uruguay); March 9, 2023 (Mexico)
- Running time: 71 minutes
- Country: Uruguay
- Language: Spanish
- Budget: $8.000

Carmen Vidal Female Detective (Spanish: Carmen Vidal mujer detective) is a 2020 Uruguayan neo-noir comedy thriller film written, directed, co-produced and starred by Eva Dans in her directorial debut. Luciano Demarco, Roberto Suárez and Leonor Courtoisie act in supporting roles.

== Synopsis ==
Carmen Vidal is a private detective addicted to pizza, beer and marijuana who fights a criminal senator to avenge the death of her best friend, in a noir comedy about self-improvement.

== Cast ==
The actors participating in this film are:

- Eva Dans as Carmen Vidal
- Roberto Suárez as Jorge Hernández
- Luciano Demarco as Carlos Cesárea
- Nicolás Luzardo as Ronnie Rosa-Spinoza
- Leonor Courtoisie as Ágata
- Gimena González as Teodora Muller
- Bruno Contenti as Iván
- Gustavo Cabrera as The investigator
- Enrique Bastos como Raúl

== Production ==
Principal photography began in July 2018 lasting 20 days.

== Release ==
It premiered on November 5, 2020, in Uruguayan theaters, then expanded to the Mexican market on March 9, 2023.
