= Pachacútec City Special Project =

Pachacútec City Special Project Proyecto Especial Ciudad Pachacútec
- City
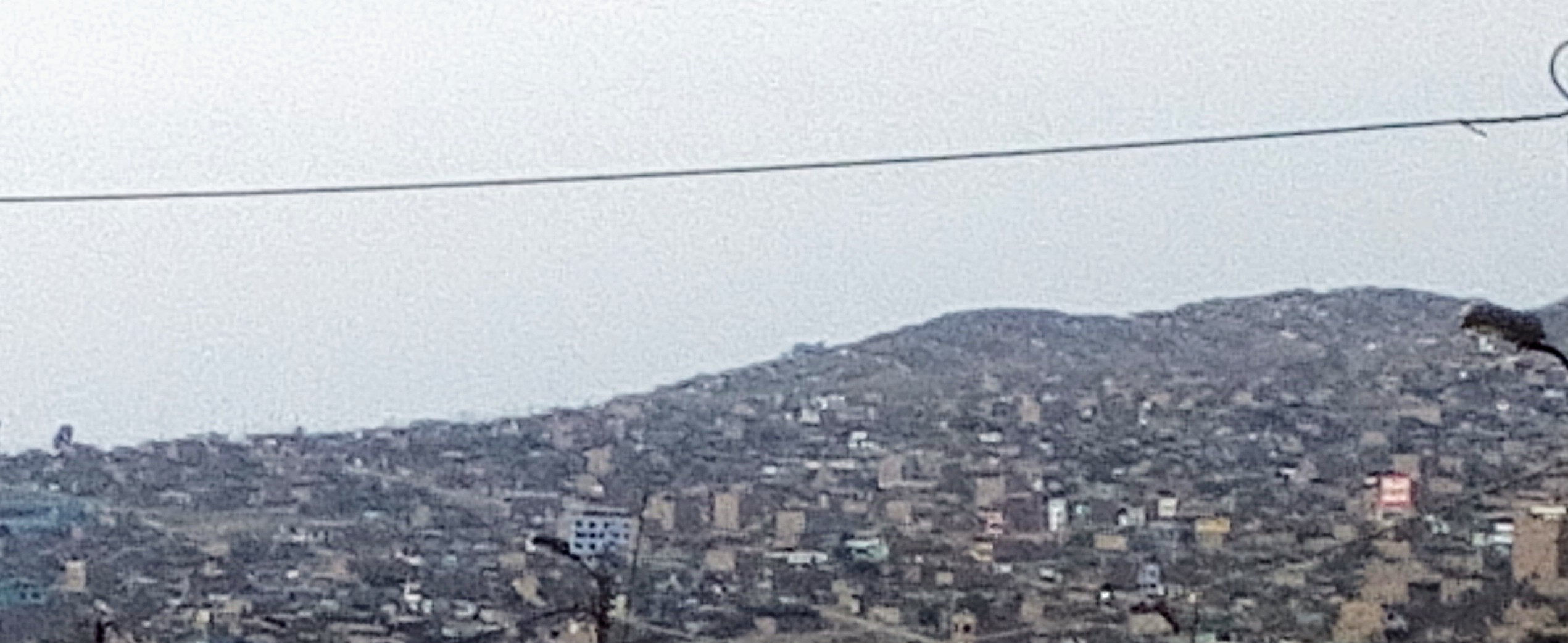
- View of Pachacútec City

- Location within Peru
- Country: Peru
- Region: Callao
- Province: Callao
- District: Ventanilla
- Time zone: UTC -5

Pachacútec, whose official name is «Pachacútec City Special Project, is located in the Ventanilla District, northwest of the Callao Province.

== History ==
=== Years 2000 ===
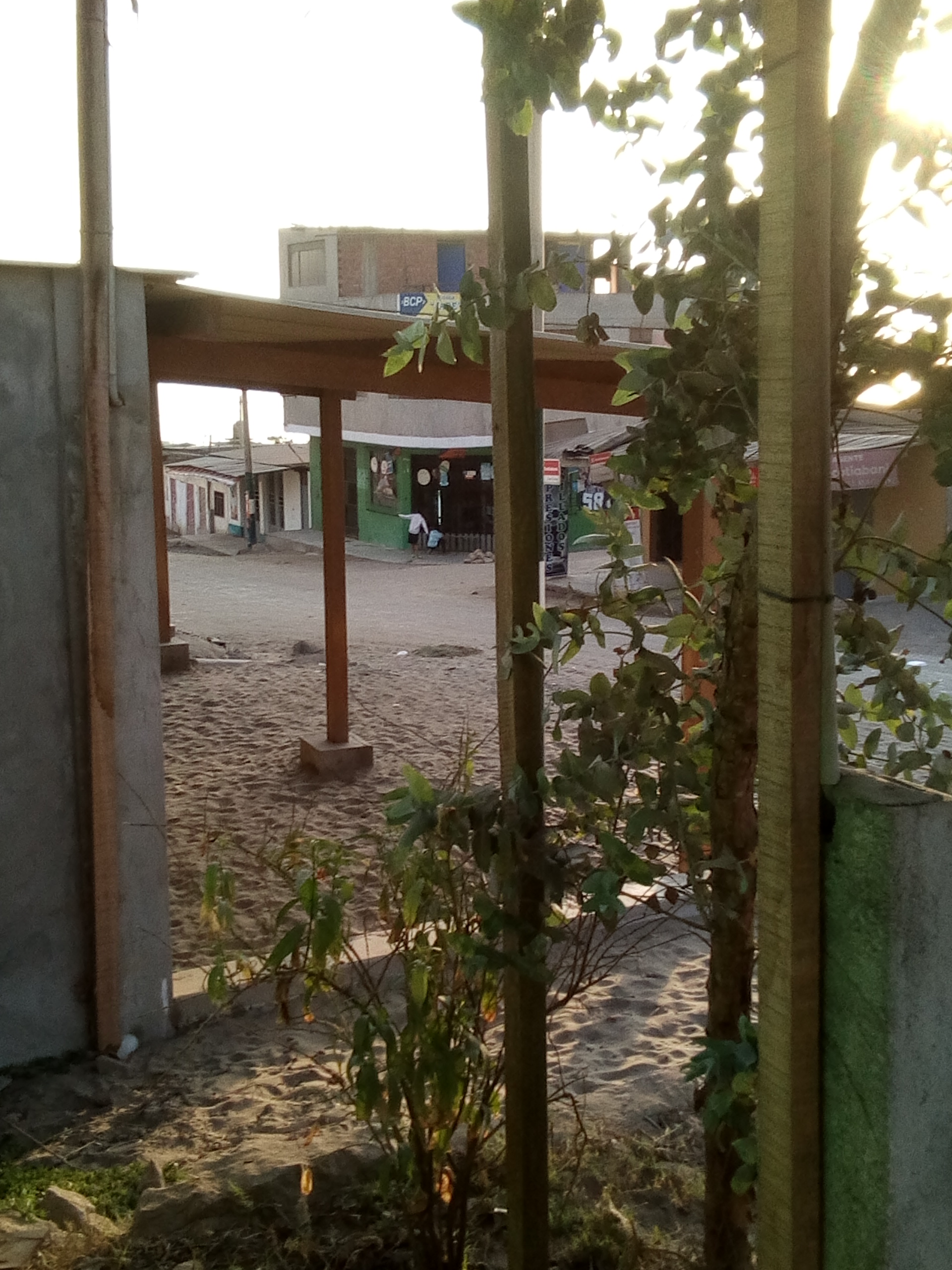
Los Ingenieros Avenue

The National Government of that time, through COFOPRI, decides to intervene. Thus, between February 3 and 6, 2000, more than seven thousand families are transferred to the Special Project Pachacútec City, district of Ventanilla, an area that had previously been selected from a set of ten alternatives, the nine zones The remainder corresponded to privately owned land. These events took place in a pre-electoral context, which motivated a hasty intervention of the National Government, committing institutions besides the aforementioned COFOPRI, to the dissolved public bodies of the Lima-Callao Development Corporation (CORDELICA) and the Ministry of the Presidency, as well as the National Food Aid Program (PRONAA), SEDAPAL, the National Police, the Army, the Navy. Everything seemed to indicate that the long-awaited basic services would come very soon, but the assistance provided only lasted until the middle of 2000. CORDELICA, supports public cleaning, donations, bins, blankets, PRONAA assists with food, SEDAPAL supports with water drinking water, COFOPRI intervened in the relocation, distributing them in five sectors and carrying out the first census in the same month of February. This relocation in Pachacútec is the main starting point for the creation of the defenestrado Family Lot Program (PROFAM), which is created by Supreme Decree No. 007-2000-MTC of February 13, 2000. In the first year the first meetings are elected transitory directives responsible for each sector and delegates of apples (20 people), in the same way the first mass of grace is performed, the first transport companies appear (41, 87, BC, R1), and the first roads and earthenware are built sports with support from CORDELICA. In the middle of the year 2000, the PROFAM carried out the second registration, educational and health modules, markets, committees of glass of milk, wawa wasi and emergency soup kitchens were created. After this second enumeration, the Central Government suspends the support and generates a conflict between the owners and starts the traffic of lots. The withdrawal of the Central Government motivates the first march demanding basic services, likewise before the problems of conflict, on November 11, 2000 the citizen security committees are sworn in coordination with the National Police. During this year the NGO Coprodeli appears, linked to the Catholic Church, which with the support of the State installs three Educational Centers in three sectors.

== Commerce ==
One of the predominant economic activities in Pachacútec is commerce. After the foundation of Pachacútec in the year 2000, Avenue 225 became the largest gestation of its commercial economic activity thanks to its main market of supplies and minor services.

Already by 2014 began an exponential growth of financial and banking entities such as municipal savings banks, private banks and banks such as Banco Azteca, MiBanco, Caja Sullana and Compartamos Financiera

== Main Avenues ==
- Avenida 225
- Avenida 200
- Avenida G
- Avenida Los Arquitectos
- Avenida Camino del Inca Izquierdo
