= César Troncoso =

Uruguayan actor

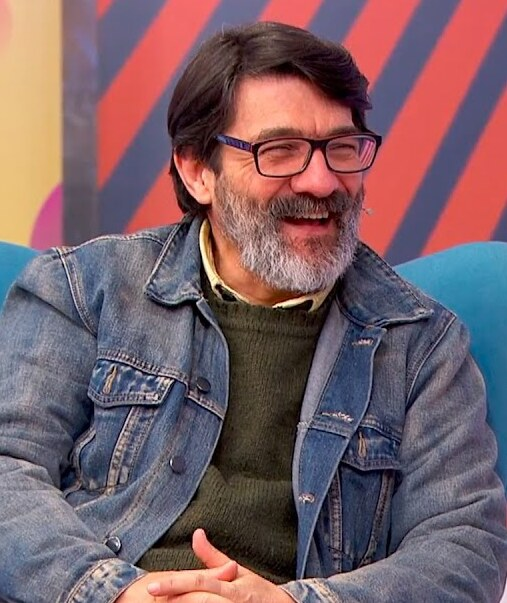
- César Troncoso in 2022
- Born: 5 April 1963 (age 63); Montevideo, Uruguay
- Occupation: Actor
- Years active: 2002-present
- Awards: Wings Award

César Troncoso (born 5 April 1963) is a Uruguayan actor. He has appeared in more than 30 films since 2002.

== Selected filmography ==
Year	Title	Role	Notes
2007	XXY	Washington	
2007	The Pope's Toilet	Beto	
2009	Bad Day to Go Fishing	Heber	
2011	Clandestine Childhood	Horacio/Daniel	
2013	Brazilian Western	Pablo	
2013	Time and the Wind	Father Alonzo	
2013	Anina	Anina's father	voice only
2017	Wood Eyes	Uncle	
2018	A Twelve-Year Night	Militar	
2022	The Visitor		
2025	Belén		
2025	The Eternaut	Alfredo Favalli	
2025	A Loose End	Notary	

== Bibliography ==
- Faraone, Diego (2020). Oficio de alto riesgo: Un recorrido por la vida y la obra de César Troncoso. Montevideo: Estuario. ISBN 9789915653112.
