= Facundo Ponce de León =

Uruguayan philosopher, journalist and documentary film director

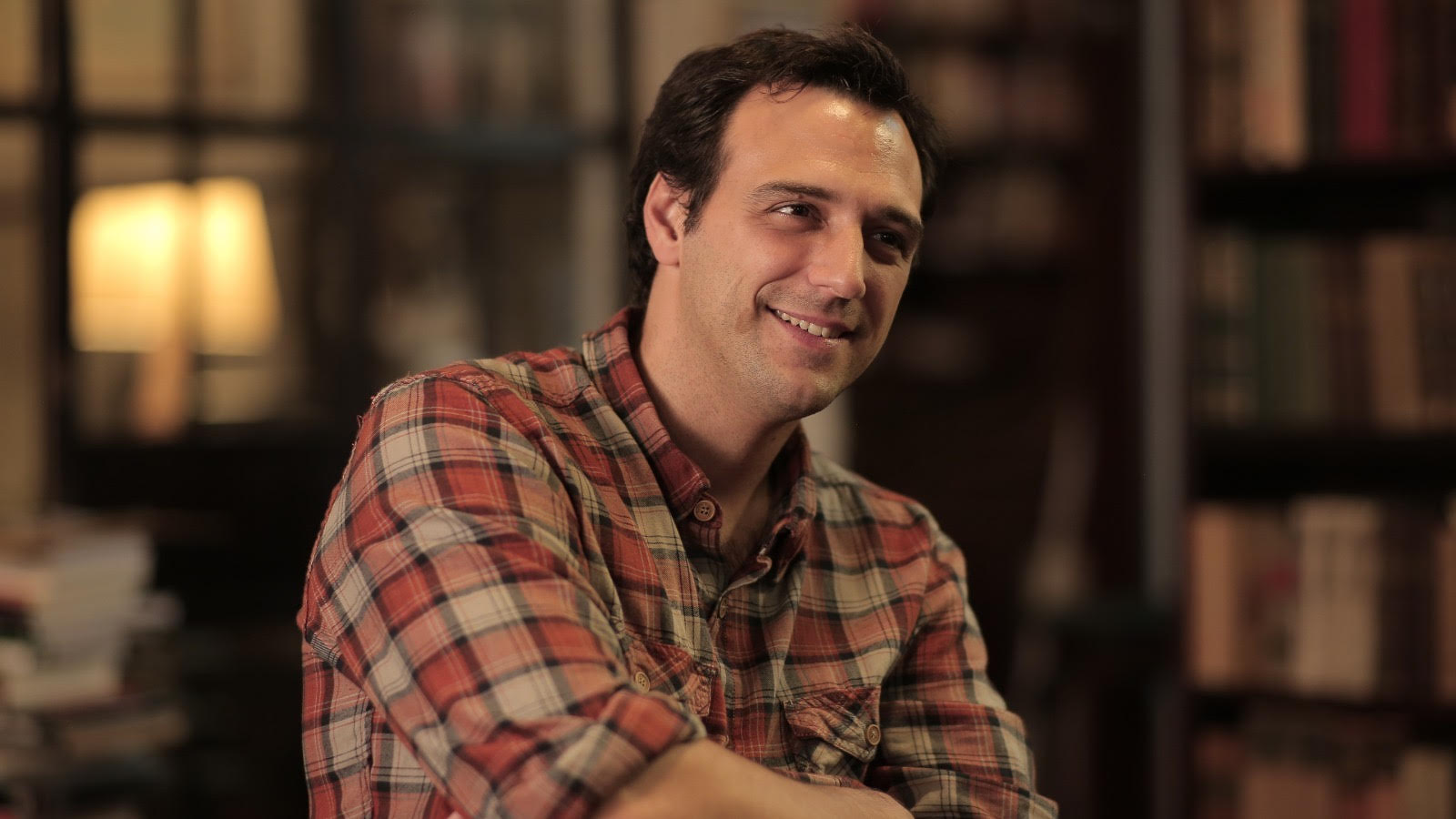
- Born: Facundo Ponce de León Reyes; August 21, 1978 (age 47); Montevideo, Uruguay
- Occupations: Philosopher, journalist, film director
- Notable work: The Door Is There

Facundo Ponce de León Reyes (born August 21, 1978) is a Uruguayan philosopher, journalist and documentary film director. Since February 2023, he has been the current president of the Agencia del Cine y el Audiovisual de Uruguay (ACAU).

== Career ==
He holds degrees in philosophy and communication sciences from the University of the Republic, a doctorate in philosophy from Carlos III University of Madrid, and is an alumnus of the German School of Montevideo. He currently teaches "pain, beauty, and death" at the Catholic University of Uruguay.

He hosted the interview series Vidas (2005–2010) and was the producer of the program El Origen (2016–2018). In 2013, he hosted the first televised meeting of the Andes survivors: El Milagro de Los Andes: la historia contada por sus protagonistas. In September 2019, he hosted De cerca, a series of in-depth interviews with the eleven national presidential candidates of Uruguay.

Before assuming his position at the Agencia del Cine y el Audiovisual de Uruguay (ACAU), he co-directed the documentary The Door Is There with his brother Juan. The film was selected for the 26th Málaga Film Festival, 71st San Sebastián International Film Festival, and 44th Havana Film Festival. It was commercially released on November 1, 2023, in Spanish theaters, and on August 8, 2024, in Uruguayan theaters.
