= Miss Tacuarembó =

2010 film by Martín Sastre

- Theatrical release poster
- Directed by: Martín Sastre
- Written by: Martín Sastre; Dani Umpi
- Based on: Miss Tacuarembó by Dani Umpi
- Produced by: Oscar Marcos Azar; Jesús Corredera; Carlos Mentasti; Diego Robino; María Zanocchi
- Starring: Natalia Oreiro; Mirella Pascual; Rossy de Palma
- Cinematography: Pedro Luque
- Edited by: Sebastián Dubé
- Music by: Ignacio Pérez Marín
- Production companies: Oriental Films; Royal Cinema Group; CoolShot Films
- Release date: July 1, 2010 (Uruguay)
- Running time: 92 minutes
- Countries: Uruguay; Spain; Argentina
- Language: Spanish

Miss Tacuarembó is a 2010 musical comedy film directed by Martín Sastre and based on the novel of the same name by Uruguayan author Dani Umpi. Starring Natalia Oreiro, it follows a young woman from a small Uruguayan town who dreams of becoming a pop star, as she participates in a local beauty pageant, works as a singer in a theme park, and eventually gets a real chance through a reality show audition.

Released on 1 July 2010, Miss Tacuarembó received mixed reviews and six nominations at the 59th Silver Condor Awards, and earned Oreiro an Iris Award for Best Film Actress. The film, a co-production between Uruguay, Spain, and Argentina, also won Best Picture in the Zonazine section of the Málaga Film Festival.

== Synopsis ==
Natalia Prato (Oreiro) is a young woman who grew up in the 1980s in the small city of Tacuarembó, Uruguay, heavily influenced by the telenovela Cristal and the film Flashdance. Determined to become a famous singer, she realizes that the only way to leave her hometown and move to a larger city to pursue her dreams is by being crowned Miss Tacuarembó.

As an adult, she struggles to achieve her ambitions and works as a singer and entertainer at a theme park dedicated to the life of Jesus in Buenos Aires, far from the life she had always envisioned. It is then that she gets the opportunity to audition for a televised talent competition, which gives her a real chance to fulfill her dreams for the first time.

== Cast ==
- Natalia Oreiro as Natalia "Cristal" Prato and Cándida López
  - Sofía Silvera as young Natalia
- Diego Reinhold as Carlos
  - Mateo Capo as young Carlos
- Rossy de Palma as Patricia Peinado
- Mirella Pascual as Haydeé Prato
- Mike Amigorena ad Jesus Christ
- Alejandro Tous as Father Clever
- Mónica Villa as Mónica
- Alejandro Sergi as Salvador
- Julieta Petriella as María José López
  - María Pía Pratto as young María José
- Melina Petriella as María Noel López
  - Ema Pratto as young María Noel
- Graciela Borges as Gloria Marlene Coitiño
- Boris Bakst as Enrique/Saint Expeditus
- Leonor Courtoisie as Sister Leonor
- Jeanette Rodríguez as Cristal

== Soundtrack ==
Most of the songs in the film were written by Alejandro Sergi and performed by Natalia Oreiro, either solo or alongside other cast members.

1. "Flashdance... What a Feeling" – Natalia
2. "Ten Fé" – Sister Leonor
3. "Día de Coreografías" – Natalia, Haydeé and Mónica
4. "Cristo Park" – Natalia, Carlos and Salvador
5. "Mi Vida Eres Tú" – Natalia
6. "Perfume del Amor" – Natalia, Carlos and Enrique
7. "Cándida" – Cándida
8. "Papá" – Natalia and Jesus
9. "Flashdance... What a Feeling" (Reprise) – Natalia
10. "Cristal" (End Credits) – Natalia

== Production ==
In May 2007, Martín Sastre confirmed that he was working on a film adaptation of Dani Umpi's novel Miss Tacuarembó, with Natalia Oreiro set to star as the lead. It was also confirmed that Oreiro would portray the protagonist at ages 18 and 30, in addition to playing the character of Cándida. In January 2010, an open casting was held to select actors to play the child versions of the main characters. More than a thousand girls from Argentina and Uruguay auditioned, and Sofía Silvera, a nine-year-old Uruguayan girl from the town of Palmitas, was chosen.

Filming began on 8 March 2010 and ended on 7 April. Locations included the town of Santa Rosa, Canelones Department in Uruguay and Buenos Aires in Argentina.
