= Souls on the Coast =

1923 film

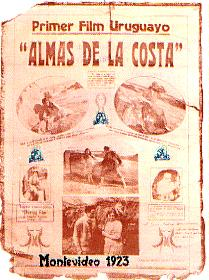
- Directed by: Juan Antonio Borges
- Written by: Antionio de La Fuente
- Produced by: Lisandro Cavaliere
- Cinematography: Isidoro Damonte; Henry Maurice
- Edited by: Henry Maurice
- Production company: Charrúa Films
- Release date: 24 September 1923
- Running time: 60 minutes
- Country: Uruguay
- Languages: Silent; Spanish intertitles

Souls on the Coast (Spanish:Almas de la costa) is a 1923 Uruguayan silent drama film directed by Juan Antonio Borges and starring Luisa von Thielmann, Remigio Guichón and Arturo Scognamiglio.

== Cast ==
- Luisa von Thielmann
- Remigio Guichón
- Arturo Scognamiglio
- Carlos Russi
- Judith Acosta y Lara
- Miguel Cristi
- Norma del Campo

== Bibliography ==
- Rist, Peter H. Historical Dictionary of South American Cinema. Rowman & Littlefield, 2014.
