= Two Destinies =

- Directed by: Juan Etchebehere
- Written by: Edmundo Bianchi
- Music by: Guillermo Zuasti
- Production company: Ciclolux
- Release date: 1936
- Running time: 76 minutes
- Country: Uruguay
- Language: Spanish

Two Destinies (Spanish:Dos destinos) is a 1936 Uruguayan drama film directed by Juan Etchebehere.

== Cast ==
- Pepita Ceppi as Lilia Alicia Campo
- Pepe Corbi as Pablo Torres
- Luis Farina as Adolfo Torres
- Carlos Garbarino as Esteban
- Tina Lova as Betty
- Ángel D. Rodríguez as General Campo

== Bibliography ==
- Rist, Peter H. Historical Dictionary of South American Cinema. Rowman & Littlefield, 2014.
