= Uruguay International Film Festival =

Annual film festival held in Montevideo, Uruguay

The Uruguay International Film Festival (Spanish: Festival Cinematográfico Internacional del Uruguay) is an international film festival that takes place every year in the city of Montevideo, Uruguay.

Established 1982, it is organized by Cinemateca Uruguaya. In April 2022 it is celebrating its 40th edition.

== See also ==
- Cinema of Uruguay
- Cinemateca Uruguaya
