= El lugar del humo =

1979 film directed by Eva Landeck

- Directed by: Eva Landeck
- Screenplay by: Eva Landeck, Oscar Legrin
- Produced by: Ramón Martínez Caldas
- Starring: George Hilton; Irene Morack; Francisco Nápoli; Enrique Guarnero; Armando Halty; Gloria Demassi; Walter Reyno; Loreley Pose; Alfredo de la Peña
- Music by: Mario Gutiérrez
- Release date: 11 October 1979 (Uruguay)
- Running time: 89 minutes
- Countries: Uruguay, Argentina
- Language: Spanish

El lugar del humo is a 1979 Uruguayan-Argentine drama film directed by Eva Landeck.

== Plot ==
A theatre company tours the country experiencing a drama, which turns into a police affair.

== Cast ==
- George Hilton
- Irene Morack
- Francisco Nápoli
- Enrique Guarnero
- Armando Halty
- Gloria Demassi
- Walter Reyno
- Loreley Pose
- Alfredo de la Peña
