= The Detective Goes the Wrong Way =

- Directed by: Adolfo L. Fabregat
- Starring: Juan Carlos Mareco
- Cinematography: Francisco Tastas Moreno
- Edited by: Daniel Spósito
- Release date: 6 October 1949
- Running time: 70 minutes
- Country: Uruguay
- Language: Spanish

The Detective Goes the Wrong Way (Spanish:Detective a contramano) is a 1949 Uruguayan comedy film directed by Adolfo L. Fabregat and starring Juan Carlos Mareco, Mirtha Torres and Roberto Fontana.

== Cast ==
- Juan Carlos Mareco as Pinocho
- Mirtha Torres
- Roberto Fontana
- Hugo Duharte
- Marta Gularte
- Dido Pastorino
- Pebete Romero

== Bibliography ==
- Rist, Peter H. Historical Dictionary of South American Cinema. Rowman & Littlefield, 2014.
