= María Mendive =

Uruguayan actress

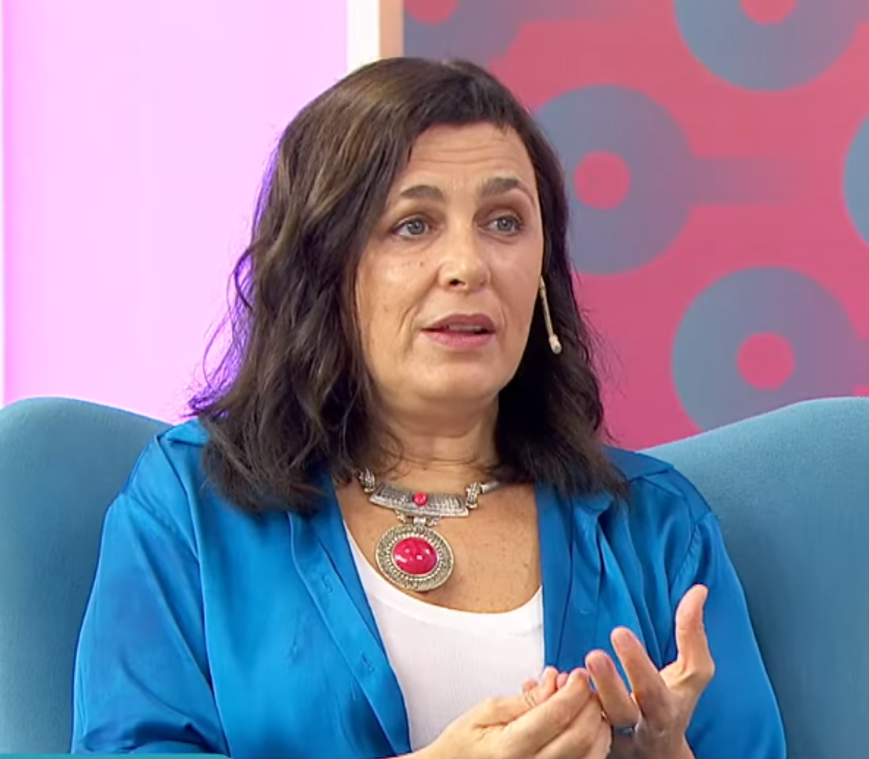
- Born: April 16, 1968 (age 58); Uruguay
- Education: Margarita Xirgu Multidisciplinary School of Dramatic Art
- Occupations: Actress, theater director, broadcaster, teacher
- Awards: Florencio Award (2013)

María Mendive (born April 16, 1968) is a Uruguayan actress, theater director, broadcaster, and teacher.

== Biography ==
María Mendive graduated from the Margarita Xirgu Multidisciplinary School of Dramatic Art. Since 2001 she has been a founder, director, and professor of the Instituto de Actuación de Montevideo (IAM), along with the actresses Gabriela Iribarren and Marisa Bentancur. She works in advertising, lending her image and voice. She was nominated for the Martín Fierro Award, and won a Florencio Award in 2013.

== Filmography ==
- 2009, Acassuso (director)
- 2013, Historias de diván (television)
- 2013, Anina
- 2012, El día de la familia
- 2016, Era el cielo
