= Ácratas =

2000 Uruguayan documentary film

- Directed by: Virginia Martínez
- Written by: Virginia Martínez
- Release date: 6 June 2000
- Running time: 73 minutes
- Country: Uruguay
- Language: Spanish

Ácratas (meaning "Anarchists") is a 2000 Uruguayan documentary film. It was written and directed by Virginia Martínez, and premiered in Argentina in 2004. The film is about anarchism in Uruguay, and gives controversial insight into the minority and indigenous movement within the libertarian movement of the 1930s.

It has received critical acclaim for its comprehensive documentation, and for the way its construction captivates the attention of the viewer, reinforcing the impact of the film. The film, long esteemed by cinephiles in Buenos Aires, also received recognition, winning First Prize for Documentary at the Festival del Cinema Latinoamericano di Trieste, and the second prize at the Festival "Contra el silencio todas las voces" of Mexico (both in 2000).

== Production ==
This self-financed independent documentary is based on photography, period films, archival materials and testimonies of survivors, families, and historians; the narrative follows the "anarchists expropriators" in the Rio de la Plata, specifically in the first third of the twentieth century. It incorporates extensive research conducted in Ushuaia, Buenos Aires, Montevideo and Barcelona. The sources of such documentation, including the archive material and Sodre Caruso, are credited at the film's end.

This was in part brought about by Osvaldo Bayer, anarchist historian, who has written about anarchists expropriators, Abel Paz, historian of the Spanish revolution, and incorporates recordings of Italian-Uruguayan intellectual Luce Fabbri.

== Synopsis ==
The documentary covers two cities, Montevideo and Buenos Aires, primarily in the 1920s and 1930s, and the men of action who migrated in from Spain, Germany, Russia and elsewhere during this time. These romantic gunmen committed their acts, not for personal gain but to fight against a regime they perceived as oppressive and repressive.

It focuses, in particular, on Miguel Arcángel Roscigna who was considered the most intelligent and reflective member of the "expropriating anarchist" movement, as he always had a detailed plan of action before attacking. Correctly or not, the film shows him participating in famous events, such as the assault on Messina Change in Montevideo or escaping the prison of Punta Carretas in 1931 where, 40 years later, the Tupamaro gas attack took place (today, it is a mall.) The film demonstrates how the media of the time printed or broadcast sensational stories about the group's activities, and dogged them. The documentary also shows how internal differences of opinion divided the group, and indeed many of his colleagues did not approve of Roscigna's peaceful activities.
