= 14th Busan International Film Festival =

2009 edition of film festival

- Opening film: Good Morning President
- Closing film: The Message
- Location: Busan, South Korea
- Film titles: 355
- Festival date: October 8 to October 16, 2009
- Website: http://www.biff.kr

Busan International Film Festival
- 15th 13th

The 14th Busan International Film Festival was held from October 8 to October 16, 2009, in Busan, South Korea.

A total of 355 films from over 70 countries were screened, beating the record set in the last festival. With a total attendance of 173,516, it had 98 world premieres and 46 international premieres.

The 9.9 billion won event opened with the South Korean film Good Morning President, directed by Jang Jin and closed with the Chinese film The Message, directed by Chen Kuo-fu and Gao Qunshu.

== Program ==
† World premiere
†† International premiere
Award winner

=== Opening Film ===
English title	Original title	Director(s)	Production country/countries	
Good Morning President	굿모닝 프레지던트; Gutmoning peurejideonteu	Jang Jin	South Korea	†

=== Gala Presentation ===
English title	Original title	Director(s)	Production country/countries	
A Little Pond	작은 연못; Jakeun yeonmot	Lee Saang-woo	South Korea	†
Chengdu, I Love You	成都我爱你; Chengdu, Wo Ai Ni	Cui Jian; Fruit Chan	China	
I Am Love	Io sono l'amore	Luca Guadagnino	Italy	†
I Come with the Rain		Tran Anh Hung	France; United States	
In My End Is My Beginning	끝과 시작; Ggeutgwa sijak	Min Kyu-dong	South Korea	†
The Recipe	된장; Doenjang (lit. "Soybean paste")	Anna Lee	South Korea	†
Symbol	しんぼる; Shinboru	Hitoshi Matsumoto	Japan	
The Fair Love	페어 러브; Pe-eo Reobeu	Shin Yeon-shick	South Korea	†

=== A Window on Asian Cinema ===
English title	Original title	Director(s)	Production country/countries	
15 Malaysia		Directors: Woo Ming Jin; Jordan Suleiman; Kamal Sabran; Ho Yuhang; Liew Seng Tat; Benji Lim; Mussadique Suleiman; Ron Nam; Bahir Yeusuff; Khairil Bahar; Johan John; Linus Chung; Desmond Ng; James Lee; Yasmin Ahmad; Amir Muhammad	Malaysia	†
A White Night	白夜; Byakuya	Masahiro Kobayashi	Japan	††
Accident	意外; Yì Wài	Soi Cheang	Hong Kong	
Adrift	Chơi vơi	Bui Thac Chuyen	Vietnam	
Affliction		Richard Somes	Philippines	
Air Doll	空気人形; Kūki Ningyō	Hirokazu Koreeda	Japan	
Ashkan, the Charmed Ring and Other Stories	اشکان، انگشتر متبرک و چند داستان دیگر; Ashkan, angoshtar-e motebarek va dastan-haye digar	Shahram Mokri	Iran	††
At the End of Daybreak	心魔; Shah Mo	YuHang Ho	Malaysia; Hong Kong	
Between Two Worlds	Ahasin Wetei	Vimukthi Jayasundara	Sri Lanka; France	
City of Life and Death	南京! 南京! Nanjing! Nanjing!	Lu Chuan	China	
Children Metal Divers	Bakal Boys (lit. Metal Boys)	Raltson Jover	Philippines	
Dear Doctor	ディア・ドクター; Dia Dokuta	Miwa Nishikawa	Japan	
Don't Burn	Đừng Đốt	Đặng Nhật Minh	Vietnam	
Face		Tsai Ming-liang	Taiwan; France	
God Lives in The Himalayas		Sanjay Srinivas	Nepal; India	††
Happiness of Kati	ความสุขของกะท	Genwaii Thongdeenok	Thailand	
Here		Tzu Nyen Ho	Singapore	
Herman		Hussein Hassan	Iraq	†
How Are You, Dad?	爸...你好嗎?	Chang Tso-chi	Taiwan	††
Judge	透析; Tou Xi	Jie Liu	China	
Kanikōsen	蟹工船	Hiroyuki Tanaka	Japan	†
Karaoke		Chris Chong; Chan Fui	Malaysia	
Karat 14		Parviz Shahbazi	Iran; Germany	††
Kelin		Ermek Tursunov	Kazakhstan	
Killer Bride's Perfect Crime	キラー・ヴァージンロード; Kira Vajin Rodo (lit. Killer Virgin Road)	Goro Kishitani	Japan	††
Itsuji Itao's King of the Escape		Itsuji Itao	Japan	††
Letters to an Angel		Ermek Shinarbayev	Kazakhstan	
Lola		Brillante Mendoza	Philippines	
Memory of Love	重来	Wang Chao	China; France	
Night and Fog	天水圍的夜與霧	Ann Hui	Hong Kong	
Nymph	นางไม้ Nang mai	Pen-Ek Ratanaruang	Thailand	
One Night in Supermarket	夜·店; Yè Diàn (lit. Night, Shop)	Yang Qing	China	
Opium War	جنگ تریاک	Siddiq Barmak	Afghanistan; Japan; South Korea; France	
Parade	パレード; Paredo	Isao Yukisada	Japan	†
Prince of Tears	淚王子; Lei wangzi	Yonfan	Taiwan; Hong Kong	
Sailor of Hearts	കുട്ടിസ്രാങ്ക് Kutty Srank	Shaji N. Karun	India	
Sawasdee Bangkok	สวัสดีบางกอก, เสน่ห์กรุงเทพ	Directors: Pen-Ek Ratanaruang; Kongdej Jaturanrasamee; Wisit Sasanatieng; Aditya Assarat	Thailand	
Sun Spots		Yang Heng	China; Hong Kong	
Taipei 24H		Directors: Lee Kang-sheng; Niu Chen-zer; Debbie Hsu; Lee Chi Y; Chen Dj Yin-jung; Cheng Fen-Fen; Cheng Hsiao-tse; An Jeyi	Taiwan	††
Talentime		Yasmin Ahmad	Malaysia	
Tears	眼泪; Yan Lei	Cheng Wen-tang	Taiwan	†
Tetsuo: The Bullet Man	鉄男 THE BULLET MAN	Shinya Tsukamoto	Japan	
Thanks Maa		Freddie WongIrfan Kamal	India	
The Blue Mansion		Glen Goei	Singapore; Malaysia	†
The Legend is Alive	Huyền thoại bất tử	Luu Huynh	Vietnam	
The Rainbow Troops	Laskar Pelangi	Riri Riza	Indonesia	
The Two Horses of Genghis Khan		Byambasuren Davaa	Germany	
The Warmest		Wulan Tana	China	†
Third Person Singular Number		Mostofa Sarwar Farooki	Bangladesh	†
Toad's Oil	ガマの油; Gama no Abura	Kōji Yakusho	Japan	
Weaving Girl	纺织姑娘 fǎng zhī gū niáng	Wang Quan'an	China	
Where Are You?	ワカラナイ; Wakaranai	Masahiro Kobayashi	Japan	
Woman On Fire Looks For Water	물을 찾는 불위의 여자; Muleul Chatneun Bulwiui Yeoja	Woo Ming Jin	Malaysia; South Korea	†
Yang Yang	阳阳	Yuchieh Cheng	Taiwan	

=== New Currents ===
English title	Original title	Director(s)	Production country/countries	
A Man Who Ate His Cherries		Payman Haghani	Iran	†
Dead Slowly	慢性中毒	Rita Hui	Hong Kong	†
I'm in Trouble!	나는 곤경에 처했다! Naneun Konkyeonge Cheohaessda! (lit. "The Lookout")	So Sang-min	South Korea	†
Kick Off		Shawkat Amin Korki	Kurdistan; Iraq	†
Lan	我們天上見	Jiang Wenli	China	†
Lost Paradise in Tokyo	ロストパラダイス・イン・トーキョー	Shiraishi Kazuya	Japan	††
Mundane History	เจ้านกกระจอก	Anocha Suwichakornpong	Thailand	†
My Daughter		Charlotte Lim	Malaysia	†
Paju	파주	Park Chan-ok	South Korea	†
Squalor	Astig (Mga Batang Kalye) (lit. Hard (Street Children)	Giuseppe Bede Sampedro	Philippines	††
True Noon	Qiyami roz	Nosir Saidov	Tajikistan	†
Vihir	विहीर	Umesh Vinayak Kulkarni	India	†

=== Korean Cinema Today - Panorama ===
English title	Original title	Director(s)	Production country/countries	
Cafe Noir	카페 느와르; Ka-pe-neu-wa-reu	Jung Sung-il	South Korea	
Castaway on the Moon	김씨 표류기; Kimssi Pyoryugi (lit. "Mr. Kim's drifting experience")	Lee Hae-jun	South Korea	
Haeundae	해운대	Yoon Je-kyoon	South Korea	
Like You Know It All	잘 알지도 못하면서; Jal Aljido Mot-hamyeonseo (lit. You Think You Know It All But You Don't)	Hong Sang-soo	South Korea	
Loveholic	참을 수 없는; Chameul Soo Eoptneun	Kwon Chil-in	South Korea	†
Maybe	토끼와 리저드; Tokkiwa Rijeodeu (lit. Rabbit and Lizard)	Ju Ji-hong	South Korea	†
Mother	마더; Madeo	Bong Joon-ho	South Korea	
Running Turtle	거북이 달린다; Geobuki dalinda	Lee Yeon-woo	South Korea	
The Executioner	집행자 집행자	Choi Jin-ho	South Korea	†
Thirst	박쥐; Bakjwi (lit. Bat)	Park Chan-wook	South Korea	†
Tokyo Taxi	도쿄택시; Dokyo Taekshi	Kim Tai-sik	South Korea; Japan	†
Vegetarian	채식주의자; Chaesikju-uija	Lim Woo-seong	South Korea	†
Where Are You Going?	특별시 사람들; Teukbyeolshi Saramdeul	Park Chul-woong	South Korea	†

=== Korean Cinema Today - Vision ===
English title	Original title	Director(s)	Production country/countries	
Break Away	탈주; Talju	Leesong Hee-il	South Korea	†
Dear Music: That is, their fantasy heading for the sea	친애하는 음악: 다시 말해서, 오후 한 시 가회동에서 만난 그들이 바다로 가는 판타지; Chinaehaneun Eumak: Dashi Malhaeseo, Ohu Han shi Kahuidongyeseo Manan Keudeulyi Badaro Kaneun Pantaji	Park Seong-oh	South Korea	†
Drifting Away	꼭 껴안고 눈물 핑 꼭 껴안고 눈물 핑	Kim Dong-won	South Korea	†
Enlightenment Film	계몽영화; Kyemong Yeonghwa	Park Dong-hoon	South Korea	†
Lost & Found	뭘 또 그렇게까지; Mwol Ddo Keureong Kyeoggaji	Jeon Kye-soo	South Korea	†
Mongsil	몽실언니; Mongsil Eonni	Lee Jisang	South Korea	†
Moscow	양 한 마리 양 두 마리; Yang Han Mari, Yang Du Mari	Hwang Cheol-min	South Korea	†
Our Fantastic 21st Century	너와 나의 21세기; Neowa Naui 21 segi	Ryu Hyung-ki	South Korea	†
Viewfinder	경 Kyung	Kim Jeong	South Korea	†
Wish	바람; Baram	Lee Seong-han	South Korea	†

=== Korean Cinema Retrospective ===
==== Archeology of Korean Cinema ====
English title	Director(s)	Production country/countries
The Ritual for a Soldier	Ha Gil-jong	South Korea
Bun-Rye's Story	Yu Hyun-mok	South Korea
Black Hair	Lee Man-hee	South Korea

==== Ha Kil-chong, The Dreamer for New Cinema ====
English title	Director(s)	Production country/countries
The Pollen of Flowers	Ha Gil-jong	South Korea
Her Fidelity	Ha Gil-jong	South Korea
The March of Fools	Ha Gil-jong	South Korea
I Am Looking for a Wife	Ha Gil-jong	South Korea
The Ascension of Han-ne	Ha Gil-jong	South Korea
The Home of Stars (Sequel)	Ha Gil-jong	South Korea
Byung-tae and Young-ja	Ha Gil-jong	South Korea

==== Remembering Yu Hyun-mok ====
English title	Director(s)	Production country/countries
An Aimless Bullet	Yu Hyun-mok	South Korea
Martyr	Yu Hyun-mok	South Korea

=== World Cinema ===
English title	Original title	Director(s)	Production country/countries	
A Brand New Life	여행자; Yeohaengja	Ounie Lecomte	South Korea; France	
Alive!		Artan Minarolli	Albania; Austria; France	
Angel at Sea	Un ange à la mer	Frédéric Dumont	Belgium; Canada	
Anita	Anita, la vida puede cambiar en un instante (lit. (Anita, life can change in an instant)	Marcos Carnevale	Argentina	††
Backyard	Backyard: El Traspatio	Carlos Carrera	Mexico	
Bad Day to Go Fishing	Mal día Para Pescar	Álvaro Brechner	Spain; Uruguay	
Balibo		Robert Connolly	Australia	
Blank	L'absence	Cyril de Gasperis	France	†
Bright Star		Jane Campion	United Kingdom; Australia; France	
Buben. Baraban		Alexei Mizgirev	Russia	
Cairo Time		Ruba Nadda	Canada; Ireland	††
City Island		Raymond De Felitta	United States	
Cole		Carl Bessai	Canada	††
Crush		Directors: Boris Khlebnikov; Petr Buslov; Kirill Serebrennikov; Ivan Vrypayev; Alexei German Jr.	Russia	
Dans tes bras		Hubert Gillet	France	†
Dédé		Jean-Philippe Duval	Canada	††
Deliver Us from Evil	Fri os fra det onde	Ole Bornedal	Denmark	
Diva		Jean-Jacques Beineix	France	†
Dogtooth	Κυνόδοντας; Kynodontas	Yorgos Lanthimos	Greece	
Donoma		Djinn Carrénard	France	†
Draft Dodgers		Nicolas Steil	Luxembourg; Switzerland	
Eden Is West	Eden à l'ouest	Costa-Gavras	France; Italy; Greece	
Entre Nos		Paola Mendoza; Gloria La Morte	United States; Colombia	
Ex		Fausto Brizzi	Italy	
Eye of the Storm	No Meu Lugar	Eduardo Valente	Portugal	
Father of My Children	Le Père de mes enfants	Mia Hansen-Løve	France; Germany	
Fish Tank		Andrea Arnold	United Kingdom	
Five Minutes of Heaven		Oliver Hirschbiegel	United Kingdom; Ireland	
Foxes		Mira Fornay	Slovak Republic; Czech Republic; Ireland	
Francesca		Bobby Păunescu	Romania	††
From a Whisper		Wanuri Kahiu	Kenya	
Giulia Doesn't Date at Night	Giulia non esce la sera	Giuseppe Piccioni	Italy	
Happy Ever Afters		Stephen Burke	Ireland	†
Hidden Diary	Mères et filles	Julie Lopes-Curval	France; Canada	††
Honeymoons	Medeni mesec	Goran Paskaljević	Serbia; Albania	
I Am Not Your Friend	Nem vagyok a barátod	György Pálfi	Hungary	
I Am Yours		Mariusz Grzegorzek	Poland	
Il Grande Sogno		Michele Placido	Italy; France	††
Ivul		Andrew Kötting	France; Switzerland	††
Last Ride		Glendyn Ivin	Australia	
Lebanon	לבנון	Samuel Maoz	Israel	
Leningrad		Aleksandr Buravsky	Russia; United Kingdom	†
Letters to Father Jacob	Postia pappi Jaakobille	Klaus Härö	Finland	
Liquor Store Cactus		Eugene Kim	United States	
Long Street		Revel Fox	South Africa	††
Lourdes		Jessica Hausner	Austria; France; Germany	
Low Lights		Ignas Miskinis	Lithuania	
Mademoiselle Chambon		Stéphane Brizé	France	†
Mah Saah-Sah		Daniel Kamwa	Cameroon; France	
Mary and Max		Adam Elliot	Australia	
Metastases	Metastaze	Branko Schmidt	Croatia	
Metropia		Tarik Saleh	Sweden; Denmark; Norway	
Miracle	Чудo; Chudo	Aleksandr Proshkin	Russia	††
Miracle Seller		Jaroslaw Szoda; Boleslaw Pawica	Poland; Sweden	†
Mona Lisa Has Vanished		François Lunel	France	†
My Dog Tulip		Sandra Fierlinger; Paul Fierlinger	United States	
My Tehran for Sale	تهران من، حراج	Granaz Moussavi	Iran; Australia	
OceanWorld 3D		Jean-Jacques Mantello	United Kingdom; Bahamas	
Of Love and Other Demons	Del amor y otros demonios	Hilda Hidalgo	Costa Rica; Colombia	†
Persécution		Patrice Chéreau	France	
Pete on the Way to Heaven	Петя по дороге в Царствие Небесное(lit. Petia po doroge v tsarstvie nebesnoye)	Nikolai Dostal	Russia	
She, a Chinese		Xiaolu Guo	United Kingdom; France; Germany	
Sleeping Songs		Andreas Struck	Germany	
Slovenian Girl	Slovenka	Damjan Kozole	Slovenia; Germany; Serbia; Croatia	
Tales from the Golden Age	Amintiri din epoca de aur	Directors: Cristian Mungiu; Constantin Popescu; Ioana Uricaru; Răzvan Mărculescu; Hanno Höfer	Romania; France	
Sweet Rush	Tatarak	Andrzej Wajda	Poland	
The 40th Door	40-cı qapı	Elcin Musaoglu	Azerbaijan	
The Absence		Mama Keita	France; Senegal	
The Dust of Time	Η Σκόνη του Χρόνου	Theodoros Angelopoulos	Greece; Russia; Germany; Italy	
The Famous and the Dead		Esmir Filho	Brazil; France	
The Forest	Las	Piotr Dumała	Poland	††
The French Kissers	Les Beaux Gosses (lit. The handsome boys)	Riad Sattouf	France	
The Good Heart		Dagur Kári	Iceland	
The King of Escape		Alain Guiraudie	France	
The Legacy	La donation	Bernard Émond	Canada	
The Messenger		Oren Moverman	United States	
The Milk of Sorrow	La Teta Asustada (lit. The frightened teat)	Claudia Llosa	Spain; Peru	
The Misfortunates	De helaasheid der dingen	Felix Van Groeningen	Belgium	
The Other Bank	გაღმა ნაპირი	Giorgi Ovashvili	Georgia; Kazakhstan	
The Power of the Poor	Faantan Fanga	Adama Drabo; Ladji Diakete	Mali	
The Silent Army	Wit Licht (lit. White Light)	Jean van de Velde	Netherlands; France	††
The Time That Remains		Elia Suleiman	France; Italy; Belgium	
The Waiting City		Claire McCarthy	Australia	
The White Ribbon	Das weiße Band, Eine deutsche Kindergeschichte (lit. The White Ribbon, a German Children's Story)	Michael Haneke	Germany; France; Austria; Italy	
The White Space	Lo spazio bianco	Francesca Comencini	Italy	††
Vincere		Marco Bellocchio	Italy	
Ward No. 6		Karen Shakhnazarov	Russia	
Whiskey with Vodka	Whisky mit Wodka	Andreas Dresen	Germany	
White Material		Claire Denis	France	
Winds of Sand, Women of Rock		Nathalie Borgers	Belgium; Austria; France	††
Winter in Wartime	Oorlogswinter	Martin Koolhoven	Netherlands; Belgium	
Wonderful World		Josh Goldin	United States	
Wrong Rosary	Uzak İhtimal	Mahmut Fazıl Çoşkun	Turkey	
Z		Costa-Gavras	Algeria; France	

=== Flash Forward ===
English title	Original title	Director(s)	Production country/countries	
Bridges		Julian Giulianelli	Argentina	†
Chicago Heights		Daniel Nearing	Canada; United States	†
Cosmonaut	Cosmonauta	Susanna Nicchiarelli	Italy	††
Dust		Max Jacoby	Luxembourg; Austria	†
Kino Caravan		Titus Munteanu	Romania; Germany	†
Last Cowboy Standing	Skavabölen pojat (lit. The boys from Skavaböle)	Zaida Bergroth	Finland; Germany	††
Magma		Pierre Vinour	France	†
Miss Kicki		Håkon Liu	Sweden; Taiwan	†
The Frost		Ferran Audi	Spain; Norway	††
The Loners	HaBodedim	Renen Schorr	Israel	††
Zero		Paweł Borowski	Poland	†

=== Wide Angle ===
==== Korean Short Film Competition ====
English title	Director(s)	Production country/countries	
A Perm	Lee Ran-hee	South Korea	†
A Toad	Lee Che-yun	South Korea	†
Be with Me	Kang Jin-a	South Korea	†
KTX Extra	Jeong Su-jin	South Korea	†
Man	Choi Jeong-yoel	South Korea	†
Midday Nap	Yoo Sung-yup	South Korea	†
Nobody's Burden	An Ji-eun	South Korea	†
Shhhhh	Lee Woo-jung	South Korea	†
Somewhere	Choi Yongseok	South Korea	†
Somewhere Unreached	Kim Jae-won	South Korea	†
Specters of the New World	Kim Hyun-sung	South Korea	†
Too Fragile to Be Loved	Seo Bong-seong	South Korea	†

==== Asian Short Film Competition ====
English title	Director(s)	Production country/countries	
Bonsai	Alfonso Borgy K. Torrre III	Philippines	††
Cold Noodles	Kirsten Tan	United States; Singapore	†
Magabahai	Patrick Tu	Taiwan	†
Rare Fish	Basil Vassili Mironer	Singapore; Indonesia; United States	††
Shorty	Rohit Sawakhande	India	††
Summer	He Wenchao	China	††
With Setareh till Dawn	Karim Faeghian	Iran	†

==== Short Film Showcase ====
English title	Director(s)	Production country/countries	
A Letter to Uncle Boonmee	Apichatpong Weerasethakul	Thailand	
A Silent Wait	Nurman Hakim	Indonesia	†
Ando-C	Shahram Mokri	Iran	†
Arena	João Salaviza	Portugal	
Blogog	Rommel Tolentino	Philippines	††
Comfortable Distance	James Bang	United States	†
Just Friends?	Kim Jho Kwang-soo	South Korea	†
Left Turn At Your Own Risk	Ahn Seung-hyuk	South Korea	
Minuet	Thomas Ko	United States	†
My Room	Kim Han-sung	United States	†
Phuket	Aditya Assarat	Thailand	†
Playing The Taar	Roya Sadat	Afghanistan	
Respirator	Michael Tay	Singapore	†
Shall We Take A Walk?	Kim Young-geun; Kim Ye-young	South Korea	
The End	Baik Hyun-jhin	South Korea	†
Threshold	Loo Zihan	Singapore	†
Vitthal	Vinoo Choliparambi	India	

==== Documentary Competition ====
English title	Director(s)	Production country/countries	
Beautiful Islands	Kana Tomoko	Japan	†
Earth's Women	Kwon Woo-jung	South Korea	†
In Search of the Riyal	Kesang Tseten	Nepal	††
Memories of Daechuri	Jung Il-gun	South Korea	†
Path of Anna	Naoi Riyo	Japan; Thailand	†
School	Wei Tie	China	†
Stayed Out Overnight	Kim Mire	South Korea	
The Border City 2	Hong Hyung-sook	South Korea	†
The Other Song	Saba Dewan	India	††

==== Documentary Showcase ====
English title	Director(s)	Production country/countries	
Bilal	Sourav Sarangi	India; Finland	
Border	Harutyun Khachatryan	Armenia; Netherlands	
Breezy Day	Jung Ji-won	South Korea	
Dance of Time	Song Il-gon	South Korea	†
Disorder	Huang Weikai	China	
Father and Son	Yuan He	China	†
Garapa	José Padilha	Brazil	
Home from Home	Cho Sung-hyung	Germany	
Inter View	Lee Mi-young	South Korea	†
Kimjongilia	N.C. Heikin	United States; South Korea; France	
Once Upon a Time Proletarian	Guo Xiaolu	China	
pilgrIMAGE	Mira Burt-Wintonick; Peter Wintonick	Canada	
Queer China, 'Comrade' China	Cui Zi'en	China	
Resilience	Tammy Chu	South Korea; United States	†
Sona, the Other Myself	Yang Yong-hi	South Korea; Japan	†
The Horse Boy	Michel Orion Scott	United States	
The Sunshine Boy	Friðrik Þór Friðriksson	Iceland	
This Too Shall Pass	Ang Aik Heng	Singapore	††
Virgin	Tahereh Hassanzadeh	Iran	†
White Noise	Alberto Fasulo	Italy; Switzerland	††

==== Animation Showcase ====
English title	Director(s)	Production country/countries	
My Father Is A Washerman	Srinivas Bhakta	Singapore	
Please Say Something	David OReilly	Ireland; Germany	
The Artist and His Magic	Lin Yi-chun; Weng Wei-Shiang; Tseng Hui-ching	Taiwan	†
The Cunning Tailor and the Young Man	Rashin Khayriyeh	Iran	

=== Open Cinema ===
English title	Original title	Director(s)	Production country/countries	
A Good Husband	今度は愛妻家	Yukisada Isao	Japan	†
A Match Made in the Heaven	RAB NE BANA DI JODI	Aditya Chopra	India	
All That I Love	Wszystko, co kocham	Jacek Borcuch	Poland	††
John Rabe		Florian Gallenberger	Germany; France; China	
Paranormal Activity		Oren Peli	United States	†
Sisters		Eléonore Faucher	France	†
Yatterman	ヤッターマン; Yattāman	Takashi Miike	Japan	

=== Special Program in Focus ===
==== Johnnie To: The Hood in the City ====
English title	Director(s)	Production country/countries
All About Ah-Long	Johnnie To	Hong Kong
Running Out of Time	Johnnie To	Hong Kong
Needing You...	Wai Ka-Fai; Johnnie To	Hong Kong
Running on Karma	Wai Ka-Fai; Johnnie To	Hong Kong
Breaking News	Johnnie To	Hong Kong
Election	Johnnie To	Hong Kong
Election 2	Johnnie To	Hong Kong
Exiled	Johnnie To	Hong Kong
Vengeance	Johnnie To	France; Hong Kong

==== Mabuhay! Pinoy Indi - Cinema! ====
English title	Director(s)	Production country/countries
Genghis Khan	Manuel Conde	Philippines
Passionate Strangers	Eddie Romero	Philippines
Insiang	Lino Brocka	Philippines
Itim	Mike De Leon	Philippines
Perfumed Nightmare	Kidlat Tahimik	Philippines
Manila by Night	Ishmael Bernal	Philippines
Oliver	Nick Deocampo	Philippines
Sakay	Raymond Red	Philippines
Criminal of Barrio Concepcion	Lav Diaz	Philippines
Woman of Breakwater	Mario O'Hara	Philippines
The Blossoming of Maximo Oliveros	Auraeus Solito	Philippines
The Road to Kalimugtong	Mes Guzman	Philippines
Kinatay	Brillante Mendoza	Philippines

==== Yash Chopra: Asian Filmmaker of the Year ====
English title	Director(s)	Production country/countries
Independencia	Raya Martin	Philippines; France; Germany; Netherlands
Moments	Yash Chopra	India
Dhoom 2	Sanjay Gadhvi	India; United States
New York	Kabir Khan	India; United States

==== Ani-Asia!: A Leap of Asian Feature Animation 4 ====
English title	Director(s)	Production country/countries	
First Squad: The Moment of Truth	Yoshiharu Ashino	Canada; Russia; Japan	
Geng: Pengembaraan Bermula	Nizam Razak	Malaysia	
Khan Kluay 2	Taweelap Srivuthivong	Thailand	
Mai Mai Miracle	Sunao Katabuchi	Japan	
McDull, Kung Fu Kindergarten	Brian Tse	Hong Kong; Japan; China	††
Port of Return	Mike Change	Taiwan	††
The Wanderer in the Land of Elementalia	Robert Quilao	Philippines	
What Is Not Romance	Park Jae-ok; Soo-Kyoung; Hong Eun-ji	South Korea	†

==== Dario Argento Falling in Giallo : Truth of the Invisible ====
English title	Director(s)	Production country/countries
The Bird with the Crystal Plumage	Dario Argento	Italy; Germany
Cat O' Nine Tails	Dario Argento	Italy; France; Germany
Deep Red	Dario Argento	Italy
Sleepless	Dario Argento	Italy
Giallo	Dario Argento	Italy; United Kingdom

==== HA Kil-chong and New American Cinema: Searching for New Languagesa ====
English title	Director(s)	Production country/countries
The Miracle Worker	Arthur Penn	United States
Bonnie and Clyde	Arthur Penn	United States
Midnight Cowboy	John Schlesinger	United States
Easy Rider	Dennis Hopper	United States
Taxi Driver	Martin Scorsese	United States

==== Special Commemoration of the Late Jang Jin-young - Remembering the Films of a Beautiful Actress ====
English title	Director(s)	Production country/countries
Sorum	Yoon Jong-chan	South Korea
Singles	Kwon Chil-in	South Korea
Blue Swallow	Yoon Jong-chan	South Korea

=== Midnight Passion ===
English title	Original title	Director(s)	Production country/countries	
Be My Guest		Park Soo-young	South Korea	†
Be with Me		Joachim Yeo; Jo Eun-kyung; Hong Dongmyung; Kim Jho Gwangsoo	South Korea	†
Clive Barker's Dread		Anthony DiBlasi	United Kingdom	
Coffin Rock		Rupert Glasson	Australia	
Crows II		Miike Takashi	Japan	
Hierro		Gabe Ibáñez	Spain	
Higanjima	彼岸島 (lit. Island of Paramita)	Kim Tae-kyun	South Korea; Japan	†
Last Cup: Road to the World Series of Beer Pong		Daniel Lindsay	United States	
Murderer	殺人犯	Roy Chow	Hong Kong	
Newsmakers	Goryachie novosti	Anders Banke	Russia; Sweden	
Stoic		Uwe Boll	Canada	
Stolen		Anders Anderson	United States	††
The Door		Anno Saul	Germany	
The Robbers		Yang Shupeng	China	†
Trick 'r Treat		Michael Dougherty	United States	††

=== Closing Film ===
English title	Original title	Director(s)	Production country/countries	
The Message	风声; Fēngshēng (lit. Sound of the Wind)	Chen Kuo-fu; Gao Qunshu	China	††

== Awards ==
- New Currents Award
  - Kick Off - Shawkat Amin Korki (Iraq/Japan)
  - I'm in Trouble! - So Sang-min (South Korea)
    - Special Mention: Squalor - Giuseppe Bede Sampedro (Philippines)
- Flash Forward Award - Last Cowboy Standing - Zaida Bergroth (Finland/Germany)
  - Special Mention - Miss Kicki - Håkon Liu (Sweden/Taiwan)
- Korean Cinema Award
  - Riccardo Gelli (Director of Korea Film Festival in Florence, Italy)
  - Jeannette Paulson Hereniko (President of Asia Pacific Film.com, Former Director of Hawaii International Film Festival, USA)
- Asian Filmmaker of the Year - Yash Chopra (Director & Producer, India)
- Sonje Award
  - Somewhere Unreached - Kim Jae-won (South Korea)
  - Rare Fish - Basil Vassili Mironer (Singapore/Indonesia)
- BIFF Mecenat Award
  - Earth's Women - Kwon Woo-jung (South Korea)
  - The Other Song - Saba Dewan (India)
- FIPRESCI Award - Kick Off - Shawkat Amin Korki (Iraq/Japan)
- NETPAC Award - Paju - Park Chan-ok (South Korea)
- KNN Audience Award - Lan - Jiang Wenli (China)
