= List of Uruguayan co-produced films =

This is a list of international co-production films with Uruguay.

== List ==
Title	Director	Co-produced with	Genre	Cast	Notes	Ref
Bad Day to Go Fishing	Álvaro Brechner	Spain	Drama	Gary Piquer, Jouko Ahola, Antonella Costa		
The Last Train	Diego Arsuaga	Argentina; Spain	Comedy; Drama	Héctor Alterio, Federico Luppi, Pepe Soriano		
The Minder	Rodrigo Moreno	Argentina; France; Germany	Drama	Julio Chávez, Osmar Núñez		
Norberto's Deadline	Daniel Hendler	Argentina	Comedy; Drama	Fernando Amaral, César Troncoso, Eugenia Guerty, Roberto Suárez		
A Place in the World	Adolfo Aristarain	Argentina; Spain	Drama	Federico Luppi, Cecilia Roth, José Sacristán		
Plata Quemada	Marcelo Piñeyro	Argentina; Spain	Drama	Eduardo Noriega, Leonardo Sbaraglia, Pablo Echarri		
The Pope's Toilet	César Charlone; Enrique Fernandez	Brazil	Drama	César Troncoso, Virginia Méndez, Mario Silva		
A Useful Life	Federico Veiroj	Spain	Drama	Jorge Jellinek		
Whisky	Juan Pablo Rebella; Pablo Stoll	Argentina; Germany; Spain	Drama	Andrés Pazos, Mirella Pascual, Jorge Bolani		
A Twelve-Year Night	Alvaro Brechner	Argentina; Spain	Drama	Antonio De la Torre, Chino Darín, Alfonso Tort, Soledad Villamil, Silvia Pérez Cruz		
Mr. Kaplan	Alvaro Brechner	Germany; Spain	Comedy Drama	Héctor Noguera, Néstor Guzzini, Rolf Becker		
