= No Other Choice =

2025 film by Park Chan-wook

- Theatrical release poster
- Hangul: 어쩔수가없다
- Lit.: It Cannot Be Helped
- RR: Eojjeol suga eopda
- MR: Ŏtchŏl suga ŏpta
- Directed by: Park Chan-wook
- Screenplay by: Park Chan-wook; Lee Kyoung-mi; Don McKellar; Lee Ja-hye
- Based on: The Ax by Donald Westlake
- Produced by: Park Chan-wook; Back Jisun; Michèle Ray-Gavras; Alexandre Gavras
- Starring: Lee Byung-hun; Son Ye-jin; Park Hee-soon; Lee Sung-min; Yeom Hye-ran; Cha Seung-won
- Cinematography: Kim Woo-hyung
- Edited by: Kim Sang-bum; Kim Ho-bin
- Music by: Jo Yeong-wook
- Production companies: CJ Entertainment; Moho Film; KG Productions
- Distributed by: CJ Entertainment
- Release dates: August 29, 2025 (Venice); September 24, 2025 (South Korea)
- Running time: 139 minutes
- Country: South Korea
- Language: Korean
- Budget: ₩17 billion (~$12.2 million)
- Box office: $40.2 million

No Other Choice (Korean: 어쩔수가없다) is a 2025 South Korean black comedy thriller film co-written, produced, and directed by Park Chan-wook. Based on The Ax by Donald Westlake, the film stars Lee Byung-hun, Son Ye-jin, Park Hee-soon, Lee Sung-min, Yeom Hye-ran, and Cha Seung-won. It is the second film adaptation of the novel, after the 2005 French-language feature The Axe directed by Costa-Gavras, to whom No Other Choice is dedicated in the closing credits. The film follows a desperate paper industry expert who decides to kill off his competition to be assured of the job he seeks to maintain his way of life.

The film had its world premiere in the main competition of the 82nd Venice International Film Festival on August 29, 2025, where it garnered critical acclaim. At the 83rd Golden Globe Awards, it was nominated for Best Motion Picture – Musical or Comedy, Best Foreign Language Film and Best Actor in a Motion Picture – Musical or Comedy (Lee Byung-hun). It was also selected as the South Korean entry for the Best International Feature Film category for the 98th Academy Awards, making the December shortlist, but was not nominated.

No Other Choice had its domestic premiere as the opening film of the 30th Busan International Film Festival on September 17, followed by its theatrical release in South Korea on September 24 by CJ Entertainment.

== Plot ==
Man-su, an award-winning veteran employee at a papermaking company, lives happily in his beloved childhood home with his wife Mi-ri and their children: Si-one, Mi-ri's teenage son from a previous marriage, and Ri-one, an autistic cello prodigy. The company is bought out and a devastated Man-su is laid off after defending his fellow workers, but assures his family he will resume papermaking within three months.

Thirteen months later, Man-su has been unable to find another job in the papermaking industry. His family is forced to minimize their spending, including rehoming their two dogs with Mi-ri's parents, upsetting Ri-one, whose cello teacher recommends her for expensive advanced classes. The family considers selling their home to the parents of Si-one's friend Dong-ho, and Mi-ri takes a part-time job as a dental assistant to suave dentist Jin-ho, while Man-su endures a toothache he cannot afford to treat.

Man-su attempts to join the successful Moon Paper company, but is humiliated by manager Seon-chul. Wanting his job, Man-su nearly kills Seon-chul with a potted plant, but realises this will not matter unless he is the best candidate to replace him. Instead, Man-su uses a fake job advertisement to identify his chief competitors: Beom-mo and Si-jo. Retrieving his father's Vietnam War gun, he prepares to kill Seon-chul, Beom-mo, and Si-jo to eliminate his competition.

Spying on Beom-mo, an unemployed drunkard, Man-su is bitten by a snake and treated by Beom-mo's dissatisfied wife, A-ra, and is later unable to stop Beom-mo from discovering A-ra's infidelity. A-ra finds Man-su confronting Beom-mo at gunpoint, leading to a struggle for the gun, but A-ra shoots Beom-mo dead and Man-su escapes. He arrives late to a costumed party, where Mi-ri dances with Jin-ho instead. A-ra and her lover bury Beom-mo, but Man-su recovers the gun.

Man-su and Mi-ri accuse each other of infidelity, and she reminds him that he was a violent drunk when Si-one was very young, but they reconcile. At the shoe store where Si-jo works, Man-su recognises him as a kindred devoted father, but tricks him into staying late and feigns car trouble; when Si-jo stops to help, Man-su reluctantly shoots him and drives away with his corpse.

Si-one and Dong-ho are arrested for stealing iPhones from Dong-ho's father's store, but Man-su and Mi-ri blackmail Dong-ho's father, who used the store for his own infidelity, into having Dong-ho take the blame. Detectives question Man-su about Beom-mo and Si-jo's disappearances, having linked them as unemployed paper men. Smoking on the roof, Si-one witnesses Man-su in his greenhouse trying to dismember Si-jo's corpse with a chainsaw. Unable to do so, Man-su buries the body in his garden, alongside Si-one's stolen iPhones, and plants an apple tree.

Plying Seon-chul with alcohol at his remote cabin, Man-su breaks his sobriety and drunkenly extracts his own tooth. Haunted by nightmares about his father and the chainsaw, Si-one informs his mother, who digs up the tree and calls Man-su. Determined to protect his family, Man-su suffocates Seon-chul with meat and stages his death to appear as if he choked on his own vomit. Mi-ri tells Si-one that Man-su dismembered and buried a pig to nourish the apple tree, and she and Man-su come to a tense understanding.

Moon Paper hires Man-su to replace Seon-chul, allowing the family to keep their home and reunite with their dogs. Ri-one's antisocial behavior improves, and Mi-ri realises her unusual drawings are actually musical compositions. The detectives reveal that A-ra has implicated Beom-mo as a gun-owner, and conclude that he murdered Si-jo and went on the run, lifting suspicion off Man-su. At his new job, Man-su celebrates alone in a modern paper mill run by machines instead of workers.

== Cast ==
- Lee Byung-hun as Yoo Man-su, Mi-ri's husband and Si-one and Ri-one's father, who is a paper industry expert who is struggling to find employment
- Son Ye-jin as Lee Mi-ri, Man-su's wife and Si-one and Ri-one's mother, who works as a dental assistant
- Park Hee-soon as Choi Seon-chul, Man-su's third target and the divorced line manager of Papyrus Paper who also is an influencer on social media
- Lee Sung-min as Goo Beom-mo, Man-su's first target and another paper expert who is also struggling to find a job
- Yeom Hye-ran as Lee A-ra, Beom-mo's frustrated and unfaithful wife and a struggling veteran actress
- Cha Seung-won as Ko Si-jo, Man-su's second target who works at a shoe store to provide for his family
- Yoo Yeon-seok as Oh Jin-ho, a dentist and employer of Mi-ri
- Kim Woo-seung as Si-one, Man-su and Mi-ri's teenage son
- Choi So-yul as Ri-one, Man-su and Mi-ri's prodigious young daughter
- Oh Dal-su as Detective #1
- Lee Suk-hyeong as Detective #2
- Im Tae-poong as Dong-ho, Si-one's friend
- Kim Hyung-mook as Dong-ho's father
- Woo Jeong-won as Dong-ho's mother
- Kim Hae-sook as Ok Sang-yep

== Production ==
=== Development ===
During the 14th Busan International Film Festival in 2009, it was announced that Park would remake Costa-Gavras's 2005 film The Axe. Park would later clarify that he had read Donald Westlake's 1997 novel The Ax upon which the film was based and decided to adapt it prior to knowing about Costa-Gavras's film. However, the project was delayed when Park received the screenplay for his 2012 film Stoker. In 2012, Park said he planned to make the film his next project but it still needed "more work on the casting and attracting investors".

During a live discussion with Costa-Gavras at the 24th Busan International Film Festival in 2019, Park told audiences that he was still working on his adaptation of Westlake's novel. The film was described by Park as a "lifetime project" and that while he hadn't begun filming it yet, he wished "to make this film as my masterpiece". Gavras, who still held the rights to the book, had helped Park to develop the project. The film was set to be an English-language picture, with Don McKellar co-writing the script alongside Park.

Park's team told The Hollywood Reporter that he was approaching the project with the intent to "strengthen the moral dilemma in this story as much as possible, and he will increase the role of protagonist's wife".

At the 2022 Cannes Film Festival, Park stated that the project was still in development and followed "a heartbreaking story about a middle-aged man who lost a job, and now he needs to bring the bread to the table to feed his family. So, he struggles in the process of looking for a job in a specialized field, and he becomes a serial killer."

In March 2024, Lee Byung-hun and Son Ye-jin were announced as the film's leads. Park and Son previously worked together in the 2016 movie The Truth Beneath, while Park collaborated with Lee on Joint Security Area (2000). Park revealed that the film would now be set in Korea.

In August 2024, Park's frequent collaborators Lee Kyoung-mi and Lee Ja-hye were also announced as writers on the project.

=== Filming ===
Principal photography began in August 2024. Filming wrapped in January 2025, lasting a total of five months.

=== Soundtrack ===
The film's soundtrack includes classical, Korean pop ballads, and American soul music. The opening credits and the first few minutes of the opening scene feature Mozart's Piano Concerto No. 23. "Redpepper Dragonfly" by Cho Yong-pil, "Let's Walk On" by Kim Chang-wan, and "Le badinage" by Marin Marais feature in the film.

== Release ==
In June 2025, Neon acquired North American distribution rights to No Other Choice, with Mubi taking rights to the film in the U.K., Ireland, Latin America, Spain, Turkey, the SAARC, Australia, New Zealand and the Benelux, the latter in association with its subsidiary Cinéart. According to CJ ENM and Moho Film, the film was pre-sold to over 200 countries around the world, including North America, the UK, France, Germany, and Japan. It surpasses the pre-sale record of 192 countries held by Park Chan-wook's 2022 film Decision to Leave.

The film had its world premiere in the main competition of the 82nd Venice International Film Festival on August 29, 2025. It had its North American premiere on September 5, 2025, at the 2025 Toronto International Film Festival, where Lee Byung-hun received a Special Tribute Award at the TIFF Tribute Awards event. It was also screened in the Special Presentations section at the 2025 Cinéfest Sudbury International Film Festival, Sudbury, Ontario, on September 17, 2025.

It opened the 30th Busan International Film Festival on September 17, 2025, where both Lee and Son Ye-jin were honoured with the "Actors' house", a special career retrospective. Theatrical release in South Korea followed on September 24, by CJ Entertainment. The film was screened in IMAX theaters in South Korea, while in the United States, a one-night screening was held on December 8.

On October 4, 2025, No Other Choice was presented in the "Galas & Special Presentations" and "Spotlight on Korea" sections at the 2025 Vancouver International Film Festival. It had its US premiere at the Main Slate of 2025 New York Film Festival on October 12, 2025. On October 14, the film competed in the 58th Sitges Film Festival in the Oficial Fantàstic Competició section, vying for the various awards given in the section. It was presented in the Galas section of the 2025 BFI London Film Festival on October 15, 2025, and would also be screened as a late addition to the Adelaide Film Festival on October 24, and in the Special Presentations of the 61st Chicago International Film Festival on October 25, 2025.

It was screened in the Masters section of the 2025 Stockholm International Film Festival on November 12, 2025, and in the "From the Festivals – 2025" section of the 56th International Film Festival of India in November 2025.

== Reception ==
=== Box office ===
No Other Choice recouped its 17 billion won production budget before its release through overseas presales, making its financial success unaffected by its domestic performance.

The film was released on September 24, 2025, on 2,114 screens. It opened at the top recording 331,518 viewers on its opening day at the Korean box office. The film achieved the highest opening of all time for a film directed by Park, surpassing Decision to Leave and his highest-grossing film The Handmaiden. On September 28, it surpassed 1 million cumulative viewers in five days of its release by registering 1,042,800 cumulative audience.

As of 26 February 2026, the film has grossed $39 million worldwide, including US$19.7 million from 2,938,283 domestic admissions only in South Korea.

=== Critical response ===
After earning a nine-minute standing ovation and applause at the 82nd Venice International Film Festival, The Dong-A Ilbo stated that the film left a significant mark on the Korean film industry, receiving rave reviews from international critics and media and helping to revitalize Korean cinema.

The film continued to attract critical acclaim; (Note: Multiple references:) Variety reported that critics "have hailed No Other Choice as one of Park's most humane and mordantly funny works to date." On the review aggregator website Rotten Tomatoes, 97% of 240 critics' reviews are positive, with an average rating of 8.3/10. The website's consensus reads: "Directed with pristine precision by Park Chan-wook, No Other Choice is a wickedly clever takedown of the corporate rat race that finds a perfect avatar in Lee Byung-Hun's skillfully hapless performance." Metacritic, which uses a weighted average, assigned the film a score of 86 out of 100, based on 46 critics, indicating "universal acclaim". This movie scored 7.17 out of 10 on Cine21.

Time Out rated the film 5 out of 5 stars, describing it as "a masterful work of cinema which might well be Chan-wook's masterpiece. And given this is the man who directed The Handmaiden that's saying a lot." According to Peter Bradshaw of The Guardian, who rated the film 4 stars out of 5, "it may not be Park's masterpiece but it is the best film in the Venice competition so far". Reviewing it for the Financial Times, Danny Leigh sees it as a critique of capitalism, concluding "Capitalism may offer much less choice than advertised, he tells us. The future may take even that away." Eileen Jones of Jacobin praised the film's themes, writing: "atomization, the process by which we are all forced apart into terrifying isolation, so that we each wind up playing a lone hand against the impossible forces of our own creation, has rarely been illustrated with such powerful imagery and narrative clarity."

== Awards and nominations ==
No Other Choice was selected as the South Korean entry for the Best International Feature Film category for the 98th Academy Awards.

Award	Date of ceremony	Category	Recipient(s)	Result	Ref.
Venice International Film Festival	September 6, 2025	Golden Lion	Park Chan-wook	Nominated	
TIFF Tribute Awards	September 7, 2025	Special Tribute Award	Lee Byung-hun	Honored	
Toronto International Film Festival	September 14, 2025	International People's Choice Award	No Other Choice	Won	
Sitges Film Festival	October 18, 2025	Best Feature Film	No Other Choice	Nominated	
Sitges Film Festival	October 18, 2025	Best Director	Park Chan-wook	Won	
Newport Beach Film Festival	October 22, 2025	Global Impact Award	Park Chan-wook	Honored	
Newport Beach Film Festival	October 22, 2025	Artist of Distinction Award	Lee Byung-hun	Honored	
Newport Beach Film Festival	October 22, 2025	Outstanding International Feature	No Other Choice	Won	
Newport Beach Film Festival	October 22, 2025	Outstanding Editing Feature	No Other Choice	Won	
Savannah Film Festival	October 25, 2025	International Auteur Award	Park Chan-wook	Honored	
Savannah Film Festival	October 25, 2025	International Audience Award	No Other Choice	Won	
Adelaide Film Festival	October 26, 2025	Audience Award for Feature Fiction	No Other Choice	Won	
Miami Film Festival	October 31, 2025	Master of the Precious Gem Award	Park Chan-wook	Honored	
Korean Association of Film Critics Awards	November 6, 2025	Best Supporting Actor	Park Hee-soon	Won	
Korean Association of Film Critics Awards	November 6, 2025	FIPRESCI Award (Domestic)	No Other Choice	Won	
Stockholm International Film Festival	November 14, 2025	FIPRESCI Award	No Other Choice	Won	
Blue Dragon Film Awards	November 19, 2025	Best Film	No Other Choice	Won	
Blue Dragon Film Awards	November 19, 2025	Best Director	Park Chan-wook	Won	
Blue Dragon Film Awards	November 19, 2025	Best Actor	Lee Byung-hun	Nominated	
Blue Dragon Film Awards	November 19, 2025	Best Actress	Son Ye-jin	Won	
Blue Dragon Film Awards	November 19, 2025	Best Supporting Actor	Lee Sung-min	Won	
Blue Dragon Film Awards	November 19, 2025	Best Supporting Actress	Yeom Hye-ran	Nominated	
Blue Dragon Film Awards	November 19, 2025	Best Screenplay	Park Chan-wook, Don McKellar, Lee Kyoung-mi, Lee Ja-hye	Nominated	
Blue Dragon Film Awards	November 19, 2025	Best Editing	Kim Sang-bum, Kim Ho-bin	Nominated	
Blue Dragon Film Awards	November 19, 2025	Best Cinematography and Lighting	Kim Woo-hyung, Kim Min-jae	Nominated	
Blue Dragon Film Awards	November 19, 2025	Best Art Direction	Ryu Seong-hie	Nominated	
Blue Dragon Film Awards	November 19, 2025	Best Music	Jo Yeong-wook	Won	
Blue Dragon Film Awards	November 19, 2025	Technical Award	Jo Sang-gyeong (Costume)	Won	
Gotham Independent Film Awards	December 1, 2025	Best Adapted Screenplay	Park Chan-wook, Lee Kyoung-mi, Jahye Lee and Don McKellar	Nominated	
Gotham Independent Film Awards	December 1, 2025	Best International Feature	Park Chan-wook, Alexandre Gavras, Michèle Ray-Gavras, and Back Jisun	Nominated	
Gotham Independent Film Awards	December 1, 2025	Outstanding Lead Performance	Lee Byung-hun	Nominated	
Atlanta Film Critics Circle	December 3, 2025	Top 10 Films	No Other Choice	7th Place	
Atlanta Film Critics Circle	December 3, 2025	Best International Feature	No Other Choice	Runner-up	
Toronto Film Critics Association	December 7, 2025	Best Adapted Screenplay	Park Chan-wook, Lee Kyoung-mi, Jahye Lee and Don McKellar	Runner-up	
Washington DC Area Film Critics Association	December 7, 2025	Foreign Language Film	No Other Choice	Nominated	
The New York Times Magazine	December 9, 2025	10 Best Performers of 2025	Lee Byung-hun	Won	
Astra Creative Arts Awards	December 11, 2025	Best Film Editing	Kim Sang-bum and Kim Ho-Bin	Nominated	
Chicago Film Critics Association Awards	December 11, 2025	Best Adapted Screenplay	Park Chan-wook, Lee Kyoung-mi, Don McKellar, and Lee Ja-hye	Nominated	
Chicago Film Critics Association Awards	December 11, 2025	Best Foreign Language Film	No Other Choice	Nominated	
Chicago Film Critics Association Awards	December 11, 2025	Best Editing	Kim Sang-bum and Kim Ho-bin	Nominated	
Phoenix Critics Circle	December 11, 2025	Best Foreign Language Film	No Other Choice	Nominated	
Phoenix Critics Circle	December 11, 2025	Best Director	Park Chan-wook	Nominated	
Phoenix Critics Circle	December 11, 2025	Best Cinematography	Kim Woo-hyung	Nominated	
St. Louis Film Critics Association	December 14, 2025	Best International Feature Film	No Other Choice	Nominated	
San Francisco Bay Area Film Critics Circle	December 14, 2025	Best International Feature Film	No Other Choice	Nominated	
San Francisco Bay Area Film Critics Circle	December 14, 2025	Best Adapted Screenplay	Park Chan-wook, Lee Kyoung-mi, Don Mckellar, Jahye Lee	Nominated	
Seattle Film Critics Society Awards	December 15, 2025	Best International Feature	No Other Choice - Park Chan-wook	Nominated	
New York Film Critics Online	December 15, 2025	Best Picture	No Other Choice	Nominated	
New York Film Critics Online	December 15, 2025	Best Director	Park Chan-wook	Nominated	
New York Film Critics Online	December 15, 2025	Best Actor	Lee Byung-hun	Nominated	
New York Film Critics Online	December 15, 2025	Best Ensemble Cast	No Other Choice	Nominated	
New York Film Critics Online	December 15, 2025	Best Cinematography	Kim Woo-hyung	Nominated	
New York Film Critics Online	December 15, 2025	Best International Feature	No Other Choice	Nominated	
Indiana Film Journalists Association	December 15, 2025	Best Film Finalists	No Other Choice	Top 10	
Indiana Film Journalists Association	December 15, 2025	Best Foreign Language Film	No Other Choice	Won	
Phoenix Film Critics Society	December 15, 2025	Best Foreign Language Film	No Other Choice	Won	
Dallas–Fort Worth Film Critics Association	December 17, 2025	Best Foreign Language Film	No Other Choice	4th Place	
Korean Film Producers Association Awards	December 18, 2025	Best Actor	Lee Byung-hun	Won	
Korean Film Producers Association Awards	December 18, 2025	Best Cinematography	Kim Woo-hyung	Won	
Korean Film Producers Association Awards	December 18, 2025	Best Lighting	Kim Min-jae	Won	
Korean Film Producers Association Awards	December 18, 2025	Sound Award	Kim Seok-won, Kim Hyeon-jun, Hong Yun-seong	Won	
Austin Film Critics Association	December 18, 2025	Best Adapted Screenplay	Park Chan-wook, Lee Kyoung-mi, Jahye Lee, Don McKellar, Donald E. Westlake	Nominated	
Austin Film Critics Association	December 18, 2025	Best International Film	No Other Choice	Nominated	
Florida Film Critics Circle	December 19, 2025	Best Picture	No Other Choice	Runner-up	
Florida Film Critics Circle	December 19, 2025	Best Director	Park Chan-wook	Won	
Florida Film Critics Circle	December 19, 2025	Best Actor	Lee Byung-hun	Nominated	
Florida Film Critics Circle	December 19, 2025	Best Adapted Screenplay	Park Chan-wook, Lee Kyoung-mi, Jahye Lee, Don McKellar, Donald E. Westlake	Runner-up	
Florida Film Critics Circle	December 19, 2025	Best International Film	No Other Choice	Won	
Florida Film Critics Circle	December 19, 2025	Best Editing	Kim Sang-bum, Kim Ho-bin	Nominated	
Florida Film Critics Circle	December 19, 2025	Best Visual Effects	No Other Choice	Nominated	
Las Vegas Film Critics Society	December 19, 2025	Best Adapted Screenplay	Park Chan-wook, Lee Kyoung-mi, Jahye Lee, Don McKellar, Donald E. Westlake	Nominated	
Las Vegas Film Critics Society	December 19, 2025	Best Foreign Language Film	No Other Choice	Nominated	
Online Association Of Female Film Critics	December 19, 2025	Best Adapted Screenplay	Park Chan-wook, Lee Kyoung-mi, Jahye Lee, Don McKellar, Donald E. Westlake	Nominated	
Online Association Of Female Film Critics	December 19, 2025	Best Editing	Kim Sang-bum, Kim Ho-bin	Nominated	
Online Association Of Female Film Critics	December 19, 2025	Best International Film	No Other Choice	Nominated	
Boston Online Film Critics Association	December 20, 2025	Top Ten Films of 2025	No Other Choice	4th Place	
Boston Online Film Critics Association	December 20, 2025	Best International Film	No Other Choice	Won	
Black Film Critics Circle	December 20, 2025	Top Ten Films of 2025	No Other Choice	5th Place	
Kansas City Film Critics Circle	December 21, 2025	Best Foreign Language Film	No Other Choice	Nominated	
Chunsa Film Art Awards	December 23, 2025	Best Actor	Lee Byung-hun	Won	
Chunsa Film Art Awards	December 23, 2025	Best Cinematography	Kim Woo-hyung	Won	
Chunsa Film Art Awards	December 23, 2025	Special Jury Prize	Lee Sung-min	Won	
Georgia Film Critics Association	December 27, 2025	Best Adapted Screenplay	Park Chan-wook, Lee Kyoung-mi, Don McKellar, and Jahye Lee	Nominated	
Georgia Film Critics Association	December 27, 2025	Best International Film	No Other Choice	Runner-up	
North Texas Film Critics Association	December 29, 2025	Best Foreign Language Film	No Other Choice	Nominated	
New Jersey Film Critics Circle	December 31, 2025	Best Picture	No Other Choice	Nominated	
New Jersey Film Critics Circle	December 31, 2025	Best Director	Park Chan-wook	Nominated	
New Jersey Film Critics Circle	December 31, 2025	Best Adapted Screenplay	Park Chan-wook, Lee Kyoung-mi, Don Mckellar, Jahye Lee	Runner-up	
New Jersey Film Critics Circle	December 31, 2025	Best Cinematography	Kim Woo-hyung, Kim Min-jae	Nominated	
New Jersey Film Critics Circle	December 31, 2025	Best Editing	Kim Sang-bum, Kim Ho-bin	Nominated	
New Jersey Film Critics Circle	December 31, 2025	Best International Film	No Other Choice	Won	
Portland Critics Association	December 31, 2025	Best Picture	No Other Choice	Nominated	
Portland Critics Association	December 31, 2025	Top 10 Films of 2025	No Other Choice	Placed	
Portland Critics Association	December 31, 2025	Best Film Not in the English Language	No Other Choice	Won	
Portland Critics Association	December 31, 2025	Best Screenplay	Park Chan-wook, Lee Kyoung-mi, Don Mckellar, Jahye Lee	Nominated	
Portland Critics Association	December 31, 2025	Best Director	Park Chan-wook	Nominated	
Alliance of Women Film Journalists	December 31, 2025	Best International Film	No Other Choice	Nominated	
Puerto Rico Critics Association	January 2, 2026	Best Comedy/Musical	No Other Choice	Nominated	
Puerto Rico Critics Association	January 2, 2026	Best Adapted Screenplay	Park Chan-wook, Lee Kyoung-mi, Don Mckellar, Jahye Lee	Nominated	
Puerto Rico Critics Association	January 2, 2026	Best International Film	No Other Choice	Nominated	
Puerto Rico Critics Association	January 2, 2026	Best Editing	Kim Sang-bum, Kim Ho-bin	Runner-up	
Minnesota Film Critics Association	January 2, 2026	Best International Feature	No Other Choice	Nominated	
Minnesota Film Critics Association	January 2, 2026	Best Adapted Screenplay	Park Chan-wook, Lee Kyoung-mi, Don Mckellar, Jahye Lee	Nominated	
Critics' Choice Movie Awards	January 4, 2026	Best Adapted Screenplay	Park Chan-wook, Lee Kyoung-mi, Don Mckellar, Jahye Lee	Nominated	
Critics' Choice Movie Awards	January 4, 2026	Best Foreign Language Film	No Other Choice	Nominated	
Columbus Film Critics Association	January 8, 2026	Best Film	No Other Choice	2nd Place	
Columbus Film Critics Association	January 8, 2026	Best Foreign Language Film	No Other Choice	Runner-up	
Columbus Film Critics Association	January 8, 2026	Best Adapted Screenplay	Park Chan-Wook, Lee Kyoung-Mi, Don McKellar, and Jahye Lee	Runner-up	
Astra Film Awards	January 9, 2026	Best International Feature	No Other Choice	Nominated	
Astra Film Awards	January 9, 2026	Best Motion Picture Comedy or Musical	No Other Choice	Nominated	
Astra Film Awards	January 9, 2026	Best Adapted Screenplay	Park Chan-wook, Don McKellar, Lee Kyoung-mi, and Lee Ja-hye	Nominated	
Astra Film Awards	January 9, 2026	Best Actor in a Motion Picture Comedy or Musical	Lee Byung-hun	Nominated	
Astra Film Awards	January 9, 2026	Honorary awards - Filmmaking Achievement Award	Park Chan-wook	Honored	
Critics Association Of Central Florida	January 9, 2026	Best International Film	No Other Choice	Won	
AARP Movies for Grownups Awards	January 10, 2026	Best Foreign Language Film	No Other Choice	Nominated	
Greater Western New York Film Critics Association	January 10, 2026	Best Picture	No Other Choice	Nominated	
Greater Western New York Film Critics Association	January 10, 2026	Best Adapted Screenplay	Park Chan-wook, Don McKellar, Lee Kyoung-mi, and Lee Ja-hye	Nominated	
Greater Western New York Film Critics Association	January 10, 2026	Best Foreign Language Film	No Other Choice	Nominated	
Golden Globe Awards	January 11, 2026	Best Motion Picture – Musical or Comedy	No Other Choice	Nominated	
Golden Globe Awards	January 11, 2026	Best Foreign Language Film	No Other Choice	Nominated	
Golden Globe Awards	January 11, 2026	Best Actor – Musical or Comedy	Lee Byung-hun	Nominated	
North Dakota Film Society	January 12, 2026	Best Actor	Lee Byung-hun	Nominated	
North Dakota Film Society	January 12, 2026	Best Editing	Kim Sang-beom, Kim Ho-bin	Nominated	
North Dakota Film Society	January 12, 2026	Best International Feature Film	No Other Choice	Nominated	
Palm Springs International Film Festival	January 12, 2026	Best International Feature Film	No Other Choice	Nominated	
Music City Film Critics Association	January 12, 2026	Best International Feature Film	No Other Choice	Nominated	
Hawaii Film Critics Society	January 12, 2026	Best Foreign Language Film	No Other Choice	Nominated	
Golden Tomato Awards	January 13, 2026	Best Limited Movies	No Other Choice	Nominated	
Golden Tomato Awards	January 13, 2026	Best International	No Other Choice	Nominated	
Chicago Indie Critics	January 15, 2026	Best International Film	No Other Choice	Nominated	
Utah Film Critics Association	January 17, 2026	Best Non-English Language Feature	No Other Choice	Nominated	
Houston Film Critics Society	January 20, 2026	Best Foreign Language Feature	No Other Choice	Nominated	
Denver Film Critics Society	January 24, 2026	Best Non-English Language Feature	No Other Choice	Nominated	
DiscussingFilm’s Global Film Critics Awards	January 24–25, 2026	Best Picture	No Other Choice	3rd Place	
DiscussingFilm’s Global Film Critics Awards	January 24–25, 2026	Best Director	Park Chan-wook	2nd Place	
DiscussingFilm’s Global Film Critics Awards	January 24–25, 2026	Best Adapted Screenplay	Park Chan-wook, Don McKellar, Lee Kyoung-mi, and Lee Ja-hye	3rd Place	
DiscussingFilm’s Global Film Critics Awards	January 24–25, 2026	Best Actor	Lee Byung-hun	Nominated	
DiscussingFilm’s Global Film Critics Awards	January 24–25, 2026	Best Film Editing	Kim Sang-bum, Kim Ho-bin	3rd Place	
Online Film Critics Society	January 26, 2026	Best Picture	No Other Choice	8th Place	
Online Film Critics Society	January 26, 2026	Best Film Not in the English Language	No Other Choice	Nominated	
Online Film Critics Society	January 26, 2026	Best Adapted Screenplay	Park Chan-wook, Don McKellar, Lee Kyoung-mi, and Lee Ja-hye	Nominated	
Online Film Critics Society	January 26, 2026	Best Editing	Kim Sang-bum, Kim Ho-bin	Nominated	
North Carolina Film Critics Association	January 26, 2026	Best Narrative Film	No Other Choice	Nominated	
North Carolina Film Critics Association	January 26, 2026	Best Foreign Language Film	No Other Choice	Nominated	
North Carolina Film Critics Association	January 26, 2026	Best Director	Park Chan-wook	Nominated	
North Carolina Film Critics Association	January 26, 2026	Best Adapted Screenplay	Park Chan-wook, Don McKellar, Lee Kyoung-mi, and Lee Ja-hye	Nominated	
North Carolina Film Critics Association	January 26, 2026	Best Cinematography	Kim Woo-hyung, Kim Min-jae	Nominated	
North Carolina Film Critics Association	January 26, 2026	Best Editing	Kim Sang-bum, Kim Ho-bin	Nominated	
Midnight Critics Circle	January 28, 2026	Best Picture	No Other Choice	Nominated	
Midnight Critics Circle	January 28, 2026	Best International Feature	No Other Choice	Nominated	
Midnight Critics Circle	January 28, 2026	Best Director	Park Chan-wook	Nominated	
Midnight Critics Circle	January 28, 2026	Best Actor	Lee Byung-hun	Nominated	
Midnight Critics Circle	January 28, 2026	Best Supporting Actress	Son Ye-jin	Nominated	
Midnight Critics Circle	January 28, 2026	Best Adapted Screenplay	Park Chan-wook, Don McKellar, Lee Kyoung-mi, and Lee Ja-hye	Runner-up	
Midnight Critics Circle	January 28, 2026	Best Editing	Kim Sang-bum, Kim Ho-bin	Runner-up	
Midnight Critics Circle	January 28, 2026	Best Cinematography	Kim Woo-hyung, Kim Min-jae	Nominated	
London Film Critics Circle Awards	February 1, 2026	Foreign Language Film of the Year	No Other Choice	Nominated	
International Cinephile Society	February 8, 2026	Best Adapted Screenplay	Park Chan-wook, Lee Kyoung-mi, Don McKellar, Jahye Lee	Nominated	
The Online Film & Television Association	February 15, 2026	Best Foreign Language Film	No Other Choice	Nominated	
The Online Film & Television Association	February 15, 2026	Best Movie Poster	No Other Choice	Runner-up	
British Academy Film Awards	February 22, 2026	Best Film Not in the English Language	No Other Choice	Longlisted	
Gold Derby Film Awards	February 26, 2026	Best International Feature	No Other Choice	Nominated	
Gold Derby Film Awards	February 26, 2026	Best Adapted Screenplay	Park Chan-wook, Don McKellar, Lee Kyoung-mi, and Lee Ja-hye	Nominated	
Gold Derby Film Awards	February 26, 2026	Best Film Editing	Kim Sang-bum, Kim Ho-bin	Nominated	
Dorian Award	March 3, 2026	Non-English Language Film of the Year	No Other Choice	Nominated	
Unforgettable Awards	March 7, 2026	Director Award	Park Chan-wook	Honored	
Satellite Award	March 10, 2026	Best International Film	No Other Choice	Nominated	
Satellite Award	March 10, 2026	Best Adapted Screenplay	Park Chan-wook, Don McKellar, Lee Kyoung-mi, and Lee Ja-hye	Nominated	
Academy Awards	March 15, 2026	Best International Feature Film	No Other Choice	Shortlisted	
Baeksang Arts Awards	May 8, 2026	Best Film	No Other Choice	Won	
Baeksang Arts Awards	May 8, 2026	Best Director	Park Chan-wook	Nominated	
Baeksang Arts Awards	May 8, 2026	Best Actor	Lee Byung-hun	Nominated	
Baeksang Arts Awards	May 8, 2026	Best Actress	Son Ye-jin	Nominated	
Baeksang Arts Awards	May 8, 2026	Best Supporting Actor	Lee Sung-min	Won	
Baeksang Arts Awards	May 8, 2026	Best Supporting Actress	Yeom Hye-ran	Nominated	
Baeksang Arts Awards	May 8, 2026	Best Technical Achievement	Kim Woo-hyung	Nominated	
Director's Cut Awards	May 19, 2026	Best Director (Film)	Park Chan-wook	Won	
Director's Cut Awards	May 19, 2026	Best Screenplay (Film)	Park Chan-wook, Lee Kyung-mi, Don McKellar, Lee Ja-hye	Nominated	
Director's Cut Awards	May 19, 2026	Best Actress (Film)	Son Ye-jin	Nominated	
Director's Cut Awards	May 19, 2026	Best Actor (Film)	Lee Byung-hun	Nominated	
Director's Cut Awards	May 19, 2026	Best New Actress (Film)	Yeom Hye-ran	Won	
Director's Cut Awards	May 19, 2026	Best New Actor (Film)	Park Hee-soon	Nominated	
Golden Trailer Awards	May 28, 2026	Best Independent Trailer	No Other Choice – Deep Breaths, NEON, Requiem	Nominated	
Golden Trailer Awards	May 28, 2026	Best Foreign Teaser	No Other Choice – The Axe Teaser, NEON, Aspect	Won	
Golden Cinematography Awards	June 8, 2026	Best Actress	Son Ye-jin	Won	
Buil Film Awards	October 7, 2026	Best Film	No Other Choice	Nominated	
Buil Film Awards	October 7, 2026	Best Director	Park Chan-wook	Nominated	
Buil Film Awards	October 7, 2026	Best Actor	Lee Byung-hun	Nominated	
Buil Film Awards	October 7, 2026	Best Actress	Son Ye-jin	Nominated	
Buil Film Awards	October 7, 2026	Best Supporting Actor	Lee Sung-min	Nominated	
Buil Film Awards	October 7, 2026	Best Supporting Actress	Yeom Hye-ran	Won	
Buil Film Awards	October 7, 2026	Best Cinematography	Kim Woo-hyung	Nominated	
Buil Film Awards	October 7, 2026	Art/Technical Award	Ryu Seong-hee	Nominated	
Buil Film Awards	October 7, 2026	Best Music	Jo Yeong-wook	Nominated	

== See also ==
- List of submissions to the 98th Academy Awards for Best International Feature Film
- List of South Korean submissions for the Academy Award for Best International Feature Film
