= Chi Jang Yin =

American filmmaker, photographer, curator and educator

- Yin at the Chicago International Film Festival in 2025
- Born: 1973 (age 52–53); Guangzhou, China
- Education: School of the Art Institute of Chicago
- Occupations: Filmmaker, Curator, Professor

Chinese name
- Simplified Chinese: 殷子静
- Hanyu Pinyin: Yīn Zijìng
- Yale Romanization: Yān Jíjihng
- Jyutping: Jan1 Zi2-zing6
- Website: www.chijangyin.art

Chi Jang Yin (殷子静; born in Guangzhou 1973) is an American filmmaker, photographer, curator and professor. She is best known for her experimental films that explore displacement, alienation, the absence of representation, and narrative memory. Her research methodology focuses on intersectionality, information literacy, and how digitalization of the arts and humanities can be a form of advocacy. In 2020, she was named the 2020-2021 Presidential Faculty Fellow at DePaul University. Yin is a trained facilitator at The National SEED Project on Inclusive Curriculum, founded by Peggy McIntosh and has received certifications in conflict resolution from the Program on Negotiation at Harvard Law School.

== Early life ==
When Yin was 5 years old, her family left China in the latter part of the Cultural Revolution. Her mother, an artist from an aristocratic family, first led the family to Taiwan, and then to Canada.

== Career ==
Yin received her undergraduate and graduate degrees from The School of the Art Institute of Chicago, where she studied with Yvonne Rainer and Shellie Fleming. Yin is a tenured full professor and the Chair of Film and Television Production Program at The School of Cinematic Arts at DePaul University. Yin has offered a Master Class at FAMU, The Academy of Performing Arts in Prague, Czech Republic. Previously, she was the Head of Media Art at the Department of Art, Media, and Design at DePaul University.

== Experimental film ==
Chi Jang Yin's experimental films have been featured at numerous galleries, museums, and film festivals including the Oberhausen International Short Film Festival, Germany, The Odense International Film Festival, Denmark, The Uppsala International Short Film Festival, Sweden, The Chicago International Film Festival, The Los Angeles Film Festival, The International Documentary Film Festival Amsterdam in the Netherlands (IDFA), The Metropolitan Museum of Art, Kassel Documentary Film Festival in Germany, European Media Arts Festival, Osnabrouck, Germany, Braunschweig International Film Festival, Germany The BWA Contemporary Art Gallery in Katowice, Poland, The Phoenix Art Museum, The National Museum of Women in the Arts, The Gene Siskel Film Center, and The Pacific Film Archive at the University of California, Berkeley.

=== Awards and filmography ===
- Another Clapping (2000) - Best of Film Festival, Thaw International Film and Digital Media Festival, Iowa City, IA. 2003, Best Documentary Short, Georgetown Independent Film Festival, Washington, DC. 2001, Finalist Award, Asian American Film and Video Showcase, Chicago, IL. 2001
- Untitled Affair (2003) - Second Grand Prize Award, Athens International Film Festival, Ohio. 2003
- Glass House (2005) - Best Film on Architecture, Asolo Art Film Festival, Asolo city, Italy. 2007
- Icon (2005)
- For the Unseen (2007)
- Lighthouse (2009) - Distinction Prize Award and Honorable Mention, IN-OUT Festival, the Laznia Centre for Contemporary Art (Centrum Sztuki Współczesnej Łaźnia), Poland. 2009, Premiere at The International Documentary Film Festival Amsterdam in the Netherlands (IDFA)
- Dark River (2010)
- Hannah and the Crystal Ball (2011)
- Pretend Nothing Happened (2011)
- Come Back to Me (2017)
- 1984–1989–2014 (2019)
- I Was There, Part III (2021)
- I Was There (2023) - Premiere at Ji.hlava International Documentary Film Festival
- I Was There, Part II (2024) - Nominated for the Chicago Award, Chicago International Film Festival, Premiere at The Oberhausen International Short Film Festival, Germany

=== Notable works in public collections ===
- Stanford University, Palo Alto, CA (library)
- Nagoya University, Film Library, Japan (library)
- University of Iowa Library, Iowa City, IA (library)
- University of Nevada, Reno (library)
- Film Art Foundation, San Francisco
- DePaul Art Museum, permanent collection, Chicago
- Video Data Bank

== Curatorial projects ==
In 2002, sponsored by Chicago Filmmakers, Chi Jang Yin curated a series of ten experimental 16-millimeter films and videos in a program titled When Autobiography Is Not the First Person. In 2010, sponsored by The DePaul Art Museum, she curated a documentary film exhibition that featured Disorder by Huang Weikai.

== Photography ==
Yin's digital photography that explored the work of German Modernist architect, Helmut Bartsch, was featured in LensCulture in 2019.
