= Mr. Kaplan =

2014 film

- Film poster
- Directed by: Álvaro Brechner
- Written by: Álvaro Brechner
- Starring: Héctor Noguera, Néstor Guzzini, Rolf Becker
- Cinematography: Álvaro Gutierrez
- Edited by: Nacho Ruiz Capillas
- Music by: Mikel Salas
- Distributed by: Memento Films
- Release date: 6 August 2014
- Running time: 100 minutes
- Countries: Uruguay, Spain, Germany
- Language: Spanish

Mr. Kaplan is a 2014 Uruguayan comedy-drama film directed by Álvaro Brechner. It was selected as the Uruguayan entry for the Best Foreign Language Film at the 87th Academy Awards, but was not nominated.

== Plot ==
Jacob Kaplan lives an ordinary life in Uruguay. Like many of his Jewish friends, Jacob fled Europe for South America because of World War II. Now turning 76, he is grumpy and in need of adventure. An unexpected opportunity to achieve greatness comes in the form of a quiet, elderly German, whom Mr. Kaplan believes to be a runaway Nazi. Determined to capture this Nazi, as Adolf Eichmann was captured before him, Mr. Kaplan enlists the help of Contreras, a portly ex-policeman, and together they embark on their mission.

== Cast ==
- Héctor Noguera as Jacobo (joint win with Nestor Guzzini - Havana Star Prize for Best Actor at 16th Havana Film Festival New York)
- Néstor Guzzini as Contreras
- Rolf Becker as Julius Reich
- Nidia Telles as Rebeca
- Nuria Fló as Lottie
- Leonor Svarcas as Estrella
- Gustavo Saffores as Isaac
- Hugo Piccinini as Elias
- Jorge Bolani as Kilgman

== Production ==
Director Álvaro Brechner developed the project at TorinoFilmLab, where it received support and mentorship. The film is a co-production between Uruguay, Germany, and Spain.

== Release ==
Mr. Kaplan had its international premiere at the BFI London Film Festival in October 2014. The film was released theatrically in Uruguay, where it became both an audience and critical success. It was selected as Uruguay's entry for the Best Foreign Language Film at the 87th Academy Awards.

== Music ==
The original score for Mr. Kaplan was composed by Spanish composer Mikel Salas. The soundtrack combines original compositions with previously recorded songs that reflect the film's ironic and melancholic tone.

The soundtrack includes a version of the song SS in Uruguay, originally performed by Serge Gainsbourg.

== Reception ==
=== Critical response ===
The film received positive reviews from critics. Sounds and Colours praised the performances, particularly noting that Héctor Noguera was "sensational as the film's lead." The review highlighted the film's warm humor and described it as "a delightful take on our desire to feel a purpose in our lives."

The Hollywood Reporter called it "probably the best Uruguayan film of all time." Trigon Film described Brechner's approach as demonstrating "a remarkable lightness in addressing the themes of aging and forgetting."

Mr. Kaplan attracted attention from international cultural media. In an interview with Variety, director Álvaro Brechner described the film as a reflection on dignity, memory, and aging, emphasizing its restrained and humanistic tone.

The film was also featured by Remezcla, which highlighted its use of humor and irony to address themes related to Jewish identity, historical memory, and the passage of time, situating the film within the Latin American comedy-drama tradition.

=== Accolades ===
Mr. Kaplan received seven nominations at the Platino Awards in 2015, including Best Film, Best Director, Best Screenplay, Best Cinematography, Best Art Direction, Best Editing, and Best Sound. The film was also nominated for Best Ibero-American Film at the Goya Awards and the Ariel Awards in Mexico.

Premio	Año	Categoría	Nominado	Resultado	Ref(s)
Ariel Awards, Mexico	2015	Silver Ariel – Best Latin-American Film	Álvaro Brechner (Uruguay)	Nominated	
Biarritz International Festival	2014	Best Actor	Héctor Noguera	Won	
Biarritz International Festival	2014	Best Actor	Néstor Guzzini	Won	
Chicago International Film Festival	2014	Audience Choice Award	Álvaro Brechner	Nominated	
Goya Awards	2015	Best Iberoamerican Film (Mejor Película Iberoamericana)	Uruguay/España	Nominated	
Havana Film Festival	2014	Grand Prize Coral	Álvaro Brechner (director)	Nominated	
Mar del Plata International Film Festival	2014	Roberto Tato Miller Award – Best Latin American Feature Film	Álvaro Brechner (director)	Won	
Mar del Plata International Film Festival	2014	Best Latin-American Film – Latin-American Competition	Álvaro Brechner	Nominated	
Palm Springs International Film Festival	2015	Cine Latino Award	Álvaro Brechner	Nominated	
Huelva Latin American Film Festival	2014	Silver Colon – Best Screenplay	Álvaro Brechner	Won	
Huelva Latin American Film Festival	2014	Silver Colon – Best Screenplay (Mejor Guión)	Álvaro Brechner	Won	
Uruguayan Film Critics Association	2014	UFCA Award – Best Uruguayan Film	Álvaro Brechner (director); Mariana Secco (producer); Roman Paul (producer); Gerhard Meixner (producer)	Won	
Uruguayan Film Critics Association	2014	UFCA Award – Best Latin American Film	Álvaro Brechner (director); Mariana Secco (producer); Roman Paul (producer); Gerhard Meixner (producer)	Nominated	
Uruguayan Film Critics Association	2014	UFCA Award – Best Actor	Héctor Noguera; Néstor Guzzini	Nominated	
Uruguayan Film Critics Association	2014	UFCA Award – Best Art Direction	Gustavo Ramírez	Won	
Uruguayan Film Critics Association	2014	UFCA Award – Best Director	Álvaro Brechner	Won	
Monte-Carlo Comedy Film Festival	2015	Jury Prize – Best Actor	Héctor Noguera; Néstor Guzzini	Won	
International Film Festival of India	2014	Golden Peacock – Best Film	Álvaro Brechner (director)	Nominated	
Platino Awards	2015	Platino Award – Best Film	Uruguay	Nominated	
Platino Awards	2015	Platino Award – Best Director	Álvaro Brechner; Fabián Oliver	Nominated	
Platino Awards	2015	Platino Award – Best Sound	Fabián Oliver; Nacho Royo-Villanova	Nominated	
Platino Awards	2015	Platino Award – Best Cinematography	Álvaro Gutiérrez	Nominated	
Platino Awards	2015	Platino Award – Best Screenplay	Álvaro Brechner	Nominated	
José María Forqué Awards	2015	Best Latin American Picture	Álvaro Brechner (Uruguay/España)	Nominated	
Platino Awards	2015	Premio Platino – Best Film	Álvaro Brechner (director)	Nominated	
Havana Film Festival New York	2015	Havana Star – Best Actor	Héctor Noguera; Néstor Guzzini	Won	

== See also ==
- List of submissions to the 87th Academy Awards for Best Foreign Language Film
- List of Uruguayan submissions for the Academy Award for Best Foreign Language Film
