= Uruguayan Film Critics Association Awards 2001 =

Uruguayan film awards ceremony

The 1st Uruguayan Film Critics Association Awards were held in 2001.

== Winners ==
- Best Film: Fa yeung nin wa (a.k.a. In the Mood for Love, Hong Kong/France/Thailand)
- Best Latin American Film: La Ciénaga (a.k.a. The Swamp, Argentina/France/Spain)
- Best Uruguayan Film: 25 Watts

Preceded by -	Uruguayan Film Critics Association Awards; 2001	Succeeded by UFCA Awards 2002 (2nd)
