= The Ax (novel) =

Book by Donald Westlake

- Author: Donald E. Westlake
- Language: English
- Genre: Horror
- Publisher: Mysterious Press
- Publication date: 1997
- Publication place: America
- Media type: Print (Paperback)
- Pages: 352
- ISBN: 9780892965878
- Dewey Decimal: 813/.54

The Ax is a 1997 horror thriller novel by American writer Donald E. Westlake. The story follows Burke Devore on his violent hunt for a new job.

The book was adapted into The Axe (2005) by Costa-Gavras and No Other Choice (2025) by Park Chan-wook.

== Premise ==
Burke Devore is a middle-aged manager at a paper company who is laid off after drastic cost-cutting measures. After unsuccessfully pursuing employment for 18 months, Devore begins to hunt down the seven men in his local area who could take the job that rightfully should be his.

== Development ==
Westlake began writing the novel after speaking to a group of friends about their difficult experiences conducting and being victims of layoffs. A few weeks after Westlake began writing, the New York Times published a series of newspaper articles about the trend of corporate downsizing. Westlake remarked how fortuitous it was, as the articles went on to form the basis for much of the terminology in the book.

In the process of writing, Westlake reflected on his parents' experiences of unity during the retrenchment during the Great Depression, in juxtaposition to the workers who were now being made redundant "even as the economy booms, unemployment falls and the stock market soars."

The book is dedicated to Westlake's father, Albert Joseph Westlake.

== Reception ==
The New York Times described the novel as "Satirical, provocative and tightly plotted, The Ax handily swipes at management stupidities without ever letting up on suspense. And Mr. Westlake doesn't flinch at taking his protagonist's bloody plan to its logical, morally skewed, conclusion."

The Washington Post called the novel "a tour de force of narrative immediacy" and posited it was in the same lineage as "Patricia Highsmith's The Talented Mr. Ripley and the film classic Kind Hearts and Coronets, not to mention the Heinrich von Kleist novella Michael Kohlhaas"

Charles Taylor from The Nation stated "...what makes The Ax so unnerving and so believable is the absence of irony in Burke's voice. Burke isn't embracing the new ruthlessness he sees around him. Knowing what it takes to hold on to his life doesn't make him happier because, on some level, it means accepting that everything he ever believed doesn't apply anymore."

== Awards and nominations ==
The book was nominated for the 1998 Macavity Award for Best Mystery Novel.

== Adaptations ==
The Ax has been adapted for the screen twice:

- The Axe (French: Le Couperet), a 2005 French-language production was directed by Costa-Gavras and starring José Garcia in the lead role (renamed "Bruno Davert"). Review aggregator Rotten Tomatoes reports that 80% of five critics gave the film a positive review, for an average rating of 7.2/10.
- No Other Choice (Korean: 어쩔수가없다), a 2025 South Korean production directed by Park Chan-wook and starring Lee Byung-hun (as "Yoo Man-su"). The project had initially been announced in 2009. The film competed for the Golden Lion at the 82nd Venice International Film Festival on 29 August 2025. It was also submitted as the South Korean entry for the Best International Feature Film category for the 98th Academy Awards.
