= Dalmandi =

Market in Uttar Pradesh, India

- locality, market
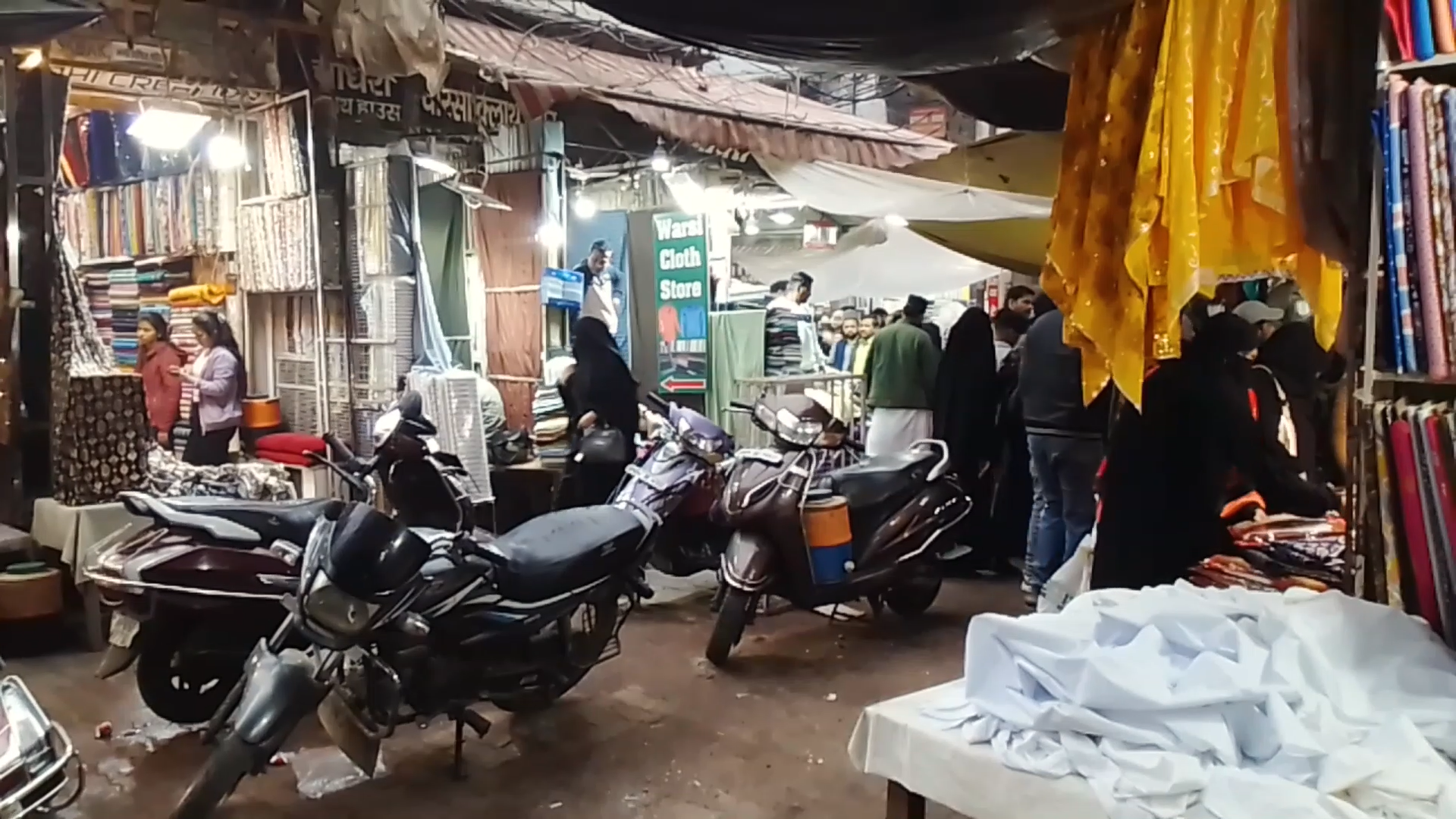
- Dalmandi

- Location in Varanasi District, Utter Pradesh, India Dalmandi (Uttar Pradesh)
- Coordinates: 25.321684°N 82.987289°E
- Country: India
- State: Uttar Pradesh
- District: Varanasi

Languages
  - Official: Hindi, English.
  - Local: Urdu and Bhojpuri
- Time zone: UTC+5:30 (IST)
- PIN: 221001
- Lok Sabha constituency: Varanasi
- Vidhan Sabha constituency: Varanasi Cantonment
- Civic agency: VMC

Dalmandi (meaning Lentil Market), officially known as Hakim Mohammad Jafar Marg is one of the largest markets of Varanasi, spanning from Beniyabagh to Chowk Police Station near Kashi Vishwanath Temple. It is located in Purvanchal and is mostly run by Muslims.

In the Dalmandi area of Varanasi, merchants historically engaged in the trade of lentils and attended performances by Tawaifs, who performed music and dance in the evenings. Over time, the variety of lentils traded in the area decreased, although the practice of performances by the Tawaifs in the Kothas continued. It is believed, during the British Raj, the strategy to expel the British from India were considered in the Kothas of Rajeshwar Bai, Jaddan Bai and Rasoolan Bai, located in the same area. Ustad Bismillah Khan lived in this area as well.

The city plans to demolish around 10,000 shops in Dalmandi to widen the eight ft-wide road to twenty-three ft in order to make the way easier for the devotees going to Kashi Vishwanath Temple. This will reduce the distance of the temple from 2.5 km to 1 km.
