= Gary Piquer =

Spanish actor

- Born: Glasgow, United Kingdom
- Occupation: Actor
- Years active: 1979-present

Gary Piquer is a Spanish actor. He appeared in more than forty films since 1979.

== Selected filmography ==
Year	Title	Role	Notes
2004	Romasanta		
2006	The Kovak Box		
2009	Bad Day to Go Fishing		
2009	Open Graves		
2012	Holmes & Watson. Madrid Days	Sherlock Holmes	
2012	If I Were You		
