= Ha Gil-jong =

South Korean filmmaker (1941–1979)

- Born: April 13, 1941; Fuzan, Chōsen, Japan
- Died: February 28, 1979 (aged 37); South Korea
- Occupations: Film director, Screenwriter
- Years active: 1969 - 1979
- Awards: Baeksang Arts Awards (1979)

Korean name
- Hangul: 하길종
- Hanja: 河吉鐘
- RR: Ha Giljong
- MR: Ha Kilchong

Ha Gil-jong (Korean: 하길종; April 13, 1941 – February 28, 1979) was a South Korean film director, screenwriter and translator. Most famous for his youth classic, The March of Fools (1975), Ha was also a very prominent social critic in his day.

== Biography ==
He was born as the seventh child of a family with nine children in Choryang-dong, Busan, Korea. His little brother Hah Myung-joong is an actor and film director. Ha lost his mother in 1945 and his father in 1950 when the Korean War occurred. Orphaned, Ha came to live with relatives. In 1956 he went to Seoul with one of his older brothers, and attended Jungdong High School in the following year. He befriended Kim Chi-Ha there who later became a famous activist poet.

In 1960, while Ha studied French literature at Seoul National University, he met the novelist Kim Seung-ok, literature critic Kim Hyun), poet Kim Chi-su, novelist Lee Cheong-jun (novelist), literature critic Yeom Mu-yeong, and literature critic and scholar of German Kim Ju-yeon. After graduation, he briefly worked for Shin Film, Ha went to the United States in 1965 to study. Ha studied fine art and photography at San Francisco Academy of Art and entered UCLA graduation school where he acquired both a MA and MFA degree. During the time, he made several short films, and one of which is The Ritual for a Soldier. With the film, he won a Mayer Grant awarded by MGM.

Ha died of a stroke in 1979, aged 37.

== Filmography ==
1. Byung-tae and Young-ja (병태와 영자 Byeongtae-wa Yeongja) (1979)
2. The Home of Stars 2 (별들의 고향 2 Byeoldeul-ui gohyang 2) (1978)
3. The Ascension of Han-ne (한네의 승천 Hanne-ui seungcheon) (1977)
4. I Am Looking For A Wife (여자를 찾습니다 Yeojaleul chajseubnida) (1976)
5. The March of Fools (바보들의 행진 Babodeul-ui haengjin) (1975)
6. Fidelity (수절 Sujeol) (1973)
7. The Pollen of Flowers (화분 Hwabun) (1972)
8. The Ritual for a Soldier (병사의 제전 1969)

== Awards and nominations ==
- 1979, the 15th Baeksang Arts Awards

== See also ==
- List of Korean film directors
- Cinema of Korea
