= Max Jacoby =

Luxembourgish film director (born 1977)

Max Jacoby (born 25 November 1977) is a Luxembourgish film director and screenwriter.

== Biography ==
Max Jacoby studied at the London Film School (formerly London International Film School) where he graduated in 2001 with his short film Babysitting. In 2003 he made a short film called The Lodge, with Eve Best in the lead role. His next film, Butterflies, was adapted from a short story by English author Ian McEwan and won, among others, the Prix UIP for 'Best European Short Film' at the 62nd Venice International Film Festival. Butterflies was also nominated for the 2005 European Film Awards.

In 2009 his first feature film Dust was released.

== Filmography ==
Year	Title
2001	Babysitting
2003	The Lodge
2005	Butterflies
2009	Dust

== Bibliography ==
- p. 190, Muller, Marco. (2005). The Venice Biennale 62nd International Exhibition of Cinematography The Retrospective, Italy: Edizioni Electa. ISBN 88-370-3714-7
