= Saba Dewan =

Indian documentary filmmaker

- Education: Jamia Millia Islamia; St. Stephen's College
- Known for: Documentary film making

Saba Dewan is an Indian documentary film maker based in New Delhi. Her films are based on sexuality, gender, identity, communalism and culture. Her notable works include Dharmayuddha (Holy War, 1989), Nasoor (Festering Wound, 1991), Khel (The Play, 1994), Barf (Snow, 1997) and Sita's Family (2001). She is best known for her trilogy on stigmatized female performers, Delhi-Mumbai-Delhi (2006), Naach (The Dance, 2008) and The Other Song (2009). She has written her first book "Tawaifnama" which has emerged from her trilogy on dancing girls. It is a well researched book on "tawaif (courtesans) living in banaras and Bhabhua. It is multi-generational chronicle first published in 2019.

== Life ==
Saba was born and brought up in New Delhi. She finished her schooling in 1982 and completed her Bachelors in History from St. Stephen's college, University of Delhi from 1982 to 1985. She further received a master's degree in Mass Communications from the Mass Communication Research Centre, Jamia Millia Islamia.

== Career ==
Saba has been working as an independent filmmaker since 1987. Her film 'Delhi-Mumbai-Delhi' (2006) focused on the lives of bar dancers in Mumbai, 'Naach' (The Dance, 2008) explored the lives of women who dance in rural fairs and the third and final film of the trilogy 'The Other Song' (2009) was about the art and lifestyle of the tawaifs or courtesans of Varanasi. In 2006, Saba withdrew her film 'Delhi Mumbai Delhi,' in protest against clause 8 of the regulations put in place by the Film Division, Ministry of Information and Broadcasting, Government of India. In 2019, Saba published Tawaifnama, a book about the musical traditions prevalent in the communities of tawaifs in Benaras.

In June 2017, Dewan led a protest against the lynching of a 15-year-old boy that occurred in a Mathura-bound train from Ballabhgarh a few days before, the killers of who allegedly taunted him over his clothes, also making reference to beef eating. Condemning the killing in a Facebook post, Dewan called for a campaign named "Not In My Name", seeking to "reclaim the Constitution" and "resist the onslaught" on right to life and equality. The campaign was received well and protests were subsequently held in Delhi, Kolkata, Mumbai, Hyderabad, Thiruvananthapuram, Bhopal and Bengaluru.

== Filmography ==
- Dharmayuddha (1989)
- Nasoor (1991)
- Khel (1994)
- Barf (1997)
- Sita's Family (2001)
- Delhi-Mumbai-Delhi (2006)
- Naach (2008)
- The Other Song (2009)
