= Antonella Costa =

Argentine film and television actress (born 1980)

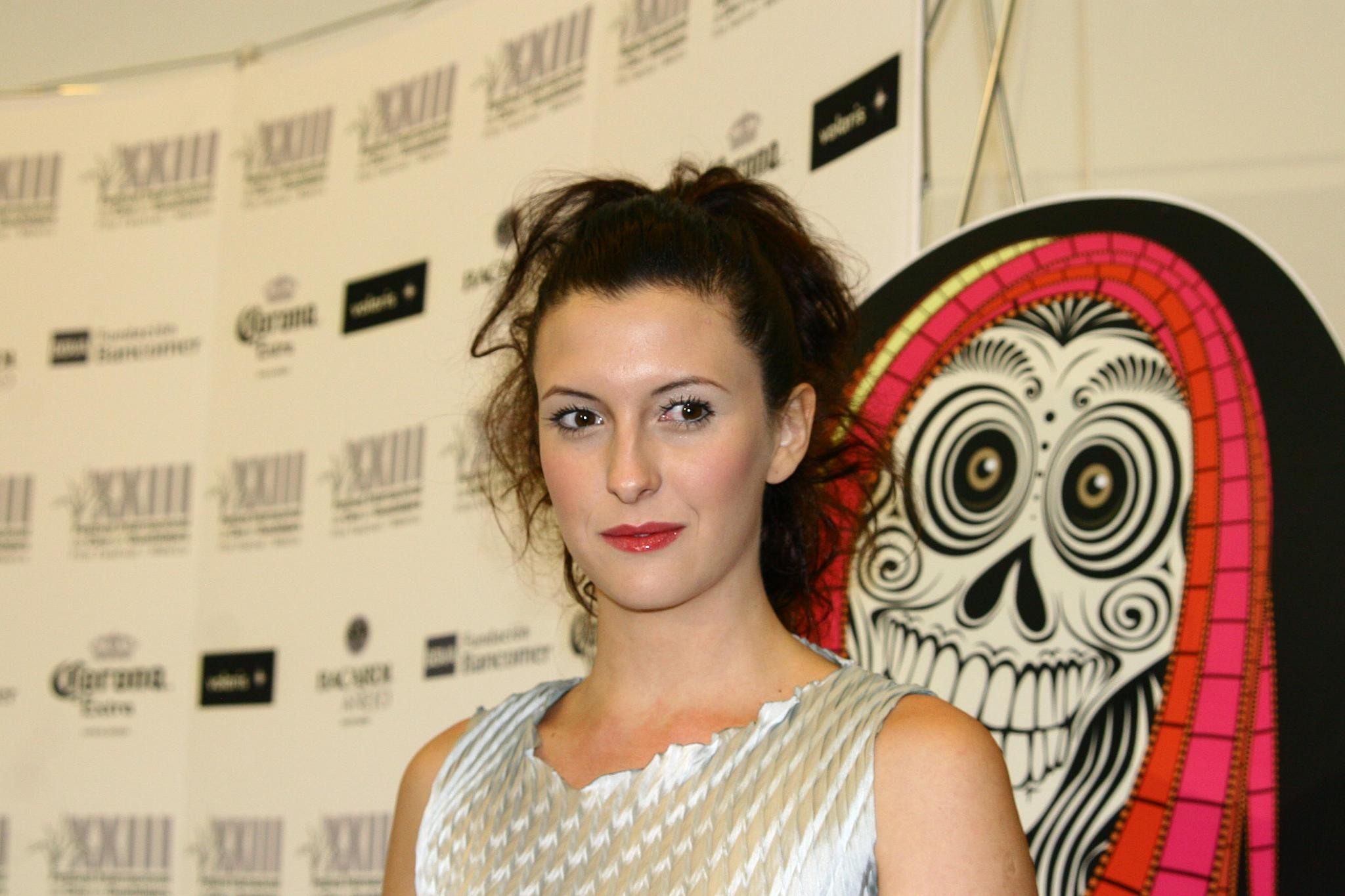
- Costa at a press meet in 2008
- Born: 19 March 1980 (age 45); Rome, Italy
- Occupation: Actress
- Years active: 1999-present

Antonella Costa (born 19 March 1980 in Rome, Italy) is an Argentine film and television actress. She moved to Argentina with her parents at the age of four. She has worked in different countries, but primarily in Argentine cinema.

== Filmography ==
- Garage Olimpo (1999) a.k.a. Garage Olimpo
- Alma mía (1999)
- El Camino (2000) a.k.a. The Road
- Figli/Hijos (2001) a.k.a. Sons and Daughters
- La Fuga (2001) a.k.a. The Escape
- La Sombra de las luces (2001)
- Pernicioso vegetal (2002)
- Hoy y mañana (2003) a.k.a. Today and Tomorrow
- Nadar solo (2003)
- The Motorcycle Diaries (2004)
- Como un avión estrellado (2005)
- El Viento (2005)
- Tres minutos (2005)
- El Cobrador: In God We Trust (2006)
- No mires para abajo (2008) a.k.a. Don't Look Down
- Mal Día Para Pescar, a.k.a. Bad Day to Go Fishing (2009)
- Felicitas (2009)
- Dry Martina (2018)

== Television ==
- El Hacker (2001) (mini TV Series) a.k.a. The Hacker
- Mujeres asesinas (2006) TV Episode
- Epitafios 2 (2009) (mini TV Series)
