= The March of Fools =

- Hangul: 바보들의 행진
- Hanja: 바보들의 行進
- RR: Babodeurui haengjin
- MR: Pabodŭrŭi haengjin
- Directed by: Ha Gil-jong
- Screenplay by: Choi In-ho
- Based on: novel The March of Fools by Choi In-ho
- Starring: Yun Mun-seop, Ha Jae-young
- Cinematography: Jung Il-sung
- Edited by: Hyeon Dong-chun
- Music by: Kang Keun-shik
- Release date: May 31, 1975
- Running time: 105 minutes
- Country: South Korea
- Language: Korean

The March of Fools (Korean: 바보들의 행진; RR: Babodeurui haengjin) is a 1975 South Korean comedy film directed by Ha Gil-jong.

== Plot ==
Philosophy university students, Byeong-tae and Yeong-cheol, make friends with female French Literature students, Yeong-ja and Sun-ja, from a nearby university. They often hang out, sharing their troubles and drinking together. They talk about their dreams for the future but the future is bleak.

== Cast ==
- Yun Mun-seop as Byeong-tae
- Ha Jae-young as Yeong-cheol
- Lee Young-ok as Yeong-ja
- Kim Yeong-suk as Sun-ja
- Hah Myung-joong
- Park Am
