= The Other Song =

2009 film by Saba Dewan

- Directed by: Saba Dewan
- Written by: Saba Dewan
- Produced by: India Foundation for the Arts
- Release date: 10 October 2009
- Country: India
- Language: English

The Other Song is a 2009 documentary film directed by Saba Dewan that journeys across Varanasi, Lucknow and Muzaffarpur, India. The film traces the lost traditions and the culture of tawaifs (courtesans of North India), particularly, through a song by Rasoolan Bai, Lagat karejwa ma chot, phool gendwa na maar and its lesser known, earlier version Lagat jobanwa ma chot, phool gendwa na maar recorded in 1935 Gramophone recording.

== The making ==
Saba Dewan spent eight years, researching and gathering information from personal and institutional archives for making The Other Song. The movie went on to become a pioneer in a space where little or no research has been done. The film has a distinctive narrative style and captures rather poetically the story of a tradition and a community lost in history, through interviews with patrons, collectors, musicians and the last of the tawaifs themselves, interspersed with, kothis and musical instruments, galis and temples, that dot the landscape.

== Synopsis ==
The film spans between personal stories as it interacts with historical events, ultimately, leading to the decline of a great art form. Weaving the past with the present, the film shows the downfall of art from and the community during the Indian Independence, as the identity of the country was being shaped more and more by the upper-caste, Hindu ideas about chastity, mother-figure, the Goddess or Bharat Mata. This new identity celebrated by the Indian bourgeois, stigmatized and punished the tawaifs and their art form for being a symbol and an expression of sexuality and eroticism. The narrative balances music and silence through Hindustani or classical Indian music, such, as thumri, dadra and folk songs, the domain of the tawaifs expertise and traces its slow suppression and disappearance by contrasting it with the silence. The silence is abruptly broken in a particular scene where a group of boys celebrating with loud Hindi-film music during an immersion procession, symbolizes the growing masochistic and chauvinistic sense of society and nation that led to the demise of the tawaif tradition as it was a digression from that identity.

== Awards ==
Macenet Award ‘Best Documentary’ Busan International Film Festival, 2009
