= Uruguayan Film Critics Association Awards 2002 =

Uruguayan film awards ceremony

2nd Uruguayan Film Critics Association Awards

The 2nd Uruguayan Film Critics Association Awards were held in 2002.

== Winners ==
- Best Film (tie): Hable con ella (Talk to Her), Spain
- Best Film (tie): Rang-e khoda (The Color of Paradise), Iran
- Best First Work: No Man's Land
- Best Latin American Film: Coronación (Coronation), Chile
- Best Uruguayan Film: El último tren (The Last Train).

Preceded by UFCA Awards 2001 (1st)	Uruguayan Film Critics Association Awards; 2002	Succeeded by UFCA Awards 2003 (3rd)
