= Blank (2009 film) =

L'absence
- French poster
- Directed by: Cyril de Gasperis
- Written by: Cyril de Gasperis
- Produced by: Cyril de Gasperis; Jean-Christophe Soulageon
- Starring: Liliane Rovère; Cecile Coustillac; Jocelyne Desverchère; Jean-Baptiste Malartre
- Cinematography: Sophie Cadet
- Edited by: Alexandra Melot
- Release dates: 28 August 2009 (Angoulême); 10 March 2010 (France)
- Running time: 75 minutes
- Country: France
- Language: French

Blank is a 2009 French drama, written and directed by Cyril de Gasperis. Its original French title is L'absence.

== Plot ==
Home care assistant, Felicia is charged with spending her days with Anna, a woman in her sixties who has dementia and requires constant care. When Anna's husband vanishes, the two women then continue their life together in a world apart, losing slowly all sense of time and self.

== Cast ==
- Cécile Coustillac as Felicia
- Liliane Rovère as Anna
- Jocelyne Desverchère as Michelle
- Jean-Baptiste Malartre as Christian
- Adrien de Van as Paul
- Eddie Chignara as Bob

== Festival ==
- Pusan International Film Festival (World Cinema)
