= Álvaro Brechner =

Uruguayan-Spanish filmmaker and screenwriter

Alvaro Brechner
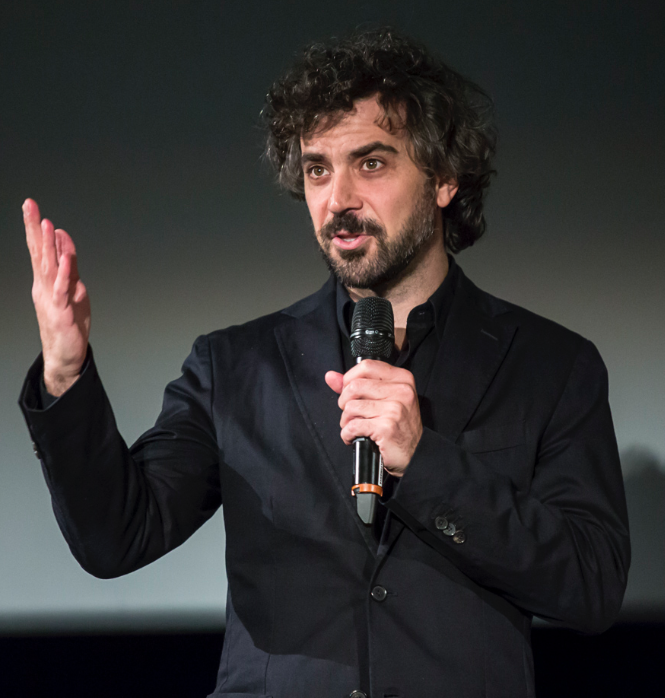
- Born: 9 April 1976 (age 50); Montevideo, Uruguay
- Occupation: Filmmaker
- Notable work: A Twelve-Year Night, Bad Day to Go Fishing, Mr. Kaplan
- Style: Dark comedy, Drama, crime, historical drama, biographical film
- Television: El Presidente, La Liga: All Access
- Children: 1

Álvaro Brechner (born 9 April 1976, Montevideo, Uruguay) is a Spanish-Uruguayan film director, screenwriter and producer based in Madrid. He won the Goya Award for Best Adapted Screenplay for A Twelve-Year Night (2018).

Brechner has written and directed the feature films Bad Day to Go Fishing (2009), Mr. Kaplan (2014) and A Twelve-Year Night, which screened at major international festivals such as the Cannes Film Festival and the Venice International Film Festival. All three films were selected as Uruguay's official submissions for the Academy Award for Best Foreign Language Film.

Variety magazine described him as "one of the leading South American screen talents to emerge in the last decade". He received the Faro de Honor lifetime achievement award at the Santander International Film Festival.

In 2025, he directed Mägo de Oz: The Movie, a large-scale international production about the Spanish folk metal band Mägo de Oz scheduled for worldwide theatrical release in 2026.

== Early life and education ==
Brechner was born in Montevideo, Uruguay, and attended the Lycée Français Jules Supervielle. Before focusing on audiovisual studies, he enrolled at the Faculty of Architecture of the University of the Republic (Uruguay) and later graduated in Media and Communication from the Catholic University of Uruguay. In 1999, he received Uruguay's National Literature Award, granted by the Ministry of Education and Culture.

Before moving to Spain, he worked in Miami for the CBS Network, covering film premieres, junkets and studio releases, an experience that strengthened his connection to the international film industry. After he completed a master's degree in Creative Documentary at the Autonomous University of Barcelona.

== Documentaries and short films ==
Brechner began his career directing and producing documentary films for broadcasters including Televisión Española (TVE), History Channel and Odisea, working on titles such as La ley del ring, Sefarad, Testimonio de una ausencia and Papá, por qué somos del Atleti? This early documentary work would later influence his interest in fiction rooted in real events.

He wrote, directed and produced the 35mm short film The Nine Mile Walk (2003), based on a story by Harry Kemelman and shot in black and white in Toledo. The film screened widely on the international festival circuit and received multiple awards. He subsequently directed the short films Sofía (2005) and Second Anniversary (2007), collaborated on music videos for several artists including Jorge Drexler, and worked as a writer on the feature documentary One Dollar.

In 2015, Variety named him one of the "10 Latin American talents to watch".

== Feature films ==
Brechner's feature films have been noted for their blend of literary influences, historical themes and character-driven narratives.

=== Bad Day to Go Fishing (2009) ===
His debut feature, Bad Day to Go Fishing premiered at the International Critics' Week of the Cannes Film Festival. Is a Spanish–Uruguayan co-production inspired by Juan Carlos Onetti's short story "Jacob and the Other". It was the Uruguayan candidate for the Academy Award for Best Foreign Language Film. The film went on to win several international awards and has been screened in many film festivals such as the 26th Warsaw International Film Festival (Best Film Free Spirit Comp.), Montreal World Film Festival, Los Angeles Latino International Film Festival (Best Film Opera Prima), Mar del Plata Film Festival (Best Actor), Moscow International Film Festival, Shanghai International Film Festival, Austin (Best Film & Audience Award), Brooklyn (Best Director), Sofia International Film Festival (Best Film Fipresci), São Paulo, Busan International Film Festival and Palm Springs International Film Festival. The film won 10 Uruguay Fipresci Critics Awards, including Best Film, Best International Film Debut, Best Director, Best Screenplay and Best Actor and was nominated for Best Film, Best Screenplay and Best Actor by the Spanish Critics (CEC).

=== Mr. Kaplan (2014) ===
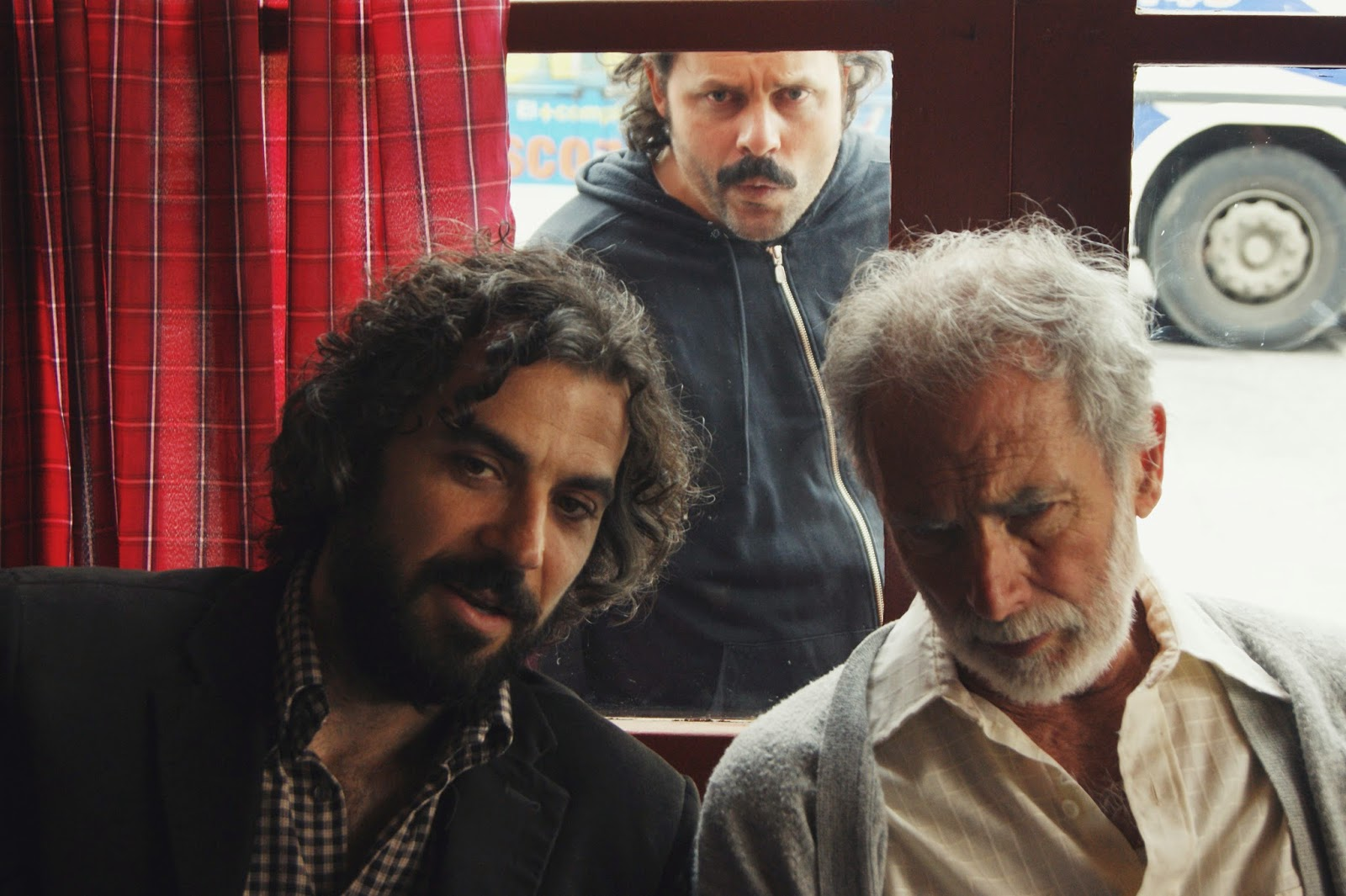
Brechner, Noguera and Guzzini shooting Mr. Kaplan

His second feature, Mr. Kaplan, is a dramatic comedy about an elderly man convinced he has identified a former Nazi living in Uruguay. The film premiered at festivals such as BFI London Film Festival, Mar del Plata Film Festival, Busan International Film Festival, Havana Film Festival, Palm Springs International Film Festival, Fribourg and Huelva Film Festival. It was the Uruguayan candidate for the Academy Award for Best Foreign Language Film, and was nominated for Best Iberoamerican Film for the Goya Awards of the Spanish Film Academy, the Ariel Award of the Mexican Academy of Film, and received 7 nominations at the 2nd Platino Awards, including Best Film of the year, Best Director, Best Screenplay, Best Photography, Best Editing, Best Sound and Best Art Direction.

=== A Twelve-Year Night (2018) ===
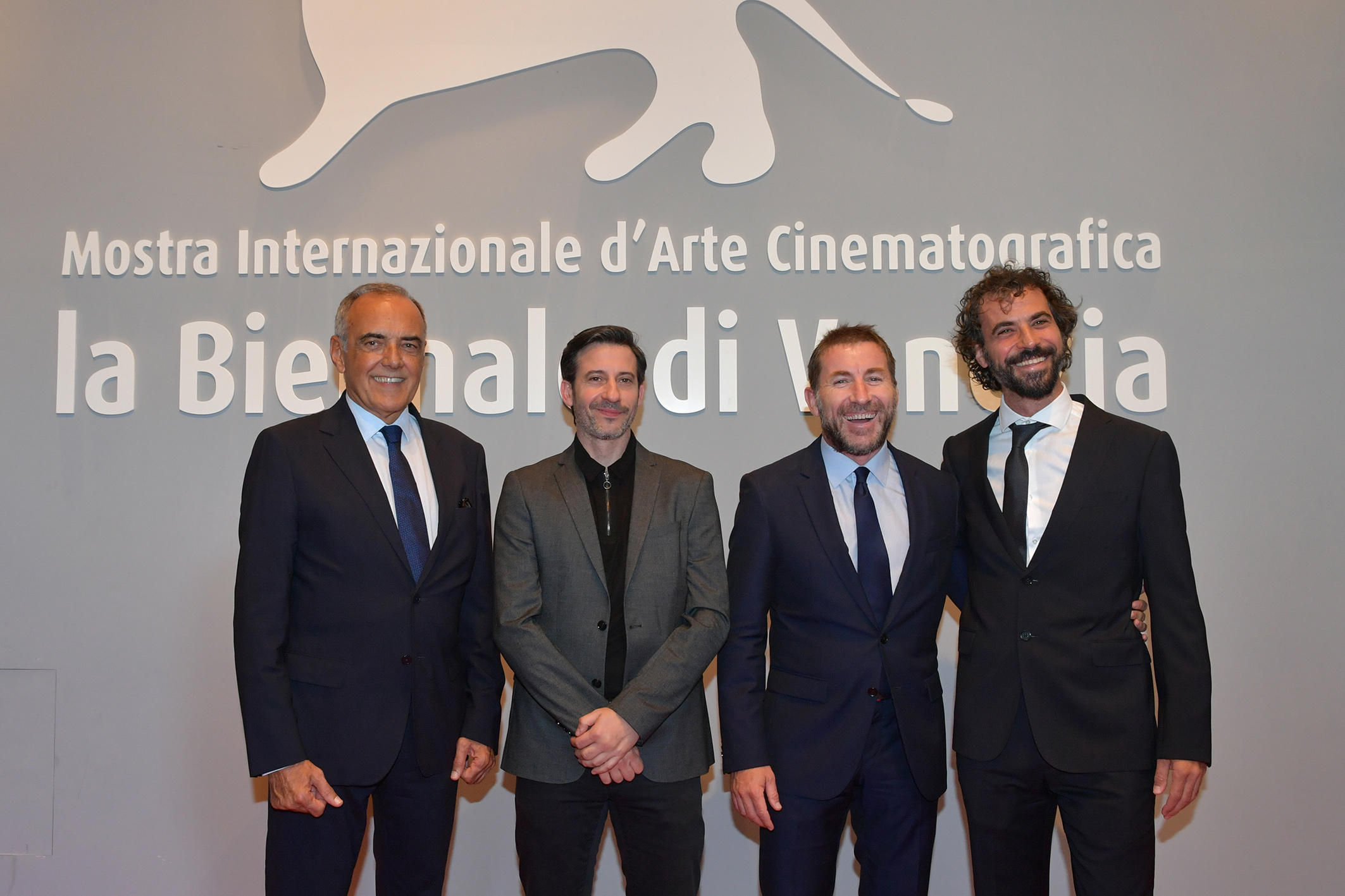
Brechner with actors Antonio de la Torre and Alfonso Tort, and Venice Film Festival director Alberto Barbera, at the world premiere of A Twelve-Year Night, 75th Venice International Film Festival, 2018.

Brechner's third feature, A Twelve-Year Night, portrays the twelve years of solitary confinement endured by José Mujica, Mauricio Rosencof and Eleuterio Fernández Huidobro during the Uruguayan military dictatorship. The film premiered in the 75th Venice International Film Festival and San Sebastian Film Festival, receiving widespread critical acclaim for its performances, direction and immersive depiction of political imprisonment.

A Twelve-Year Night went on to win the Golden Pyramid for Best Film at the Cairo International Film Festival and received seven nominations at the Platino Awards, alongside numerous other international distinctions. The film also won the Goya Award for Best Adapted Screenplay and is considered one of the most internationally distinguished Uruguayan films of recent decades. It was selected as Uruguay's official submission for both the Academy Award for Best International Feature Film and the Goya Awards.

A Twelve-Year Night was awarded at the co-production markets of Berlin International Film Festival and San Sebastián International Film Festival.

=== Mägo de Oz: The Movie (2025) ===
In 2025, Brechner wrote and directed Mägo de Oz: The Movie, an international co-production offering a stylized, fictionalized chronicle of the Spanish folk-metal band Mägo de Oz. Conceived as a hybrid musical-comedy with rock-opera elements, the film explores the band's rise, excesses and mythology through an irreverent, high-energy narrative. The film was shot over 13 weeks in Madrid and the Canary Islands, with locations in Gran Canaria and Fuerteventura standing in for Latin America. The cast includes Adrián Lastra, Roberto Álamo, Antonio Dechent, Carlos Librado "Nene", Michelle Renaud, Jorge López and Guillermo Furiase. A worldwide theatrical release is scheduled for 2026.

== Other work ==
=== Television ===
Brechner directed episodes of the second season of El Presidente: Juego de corrupción (2022), produced by Gaumont for Amazon Prime Video, and episodes of the Netflix documentary series La Liga: All Access (2023).

=== Opera ===
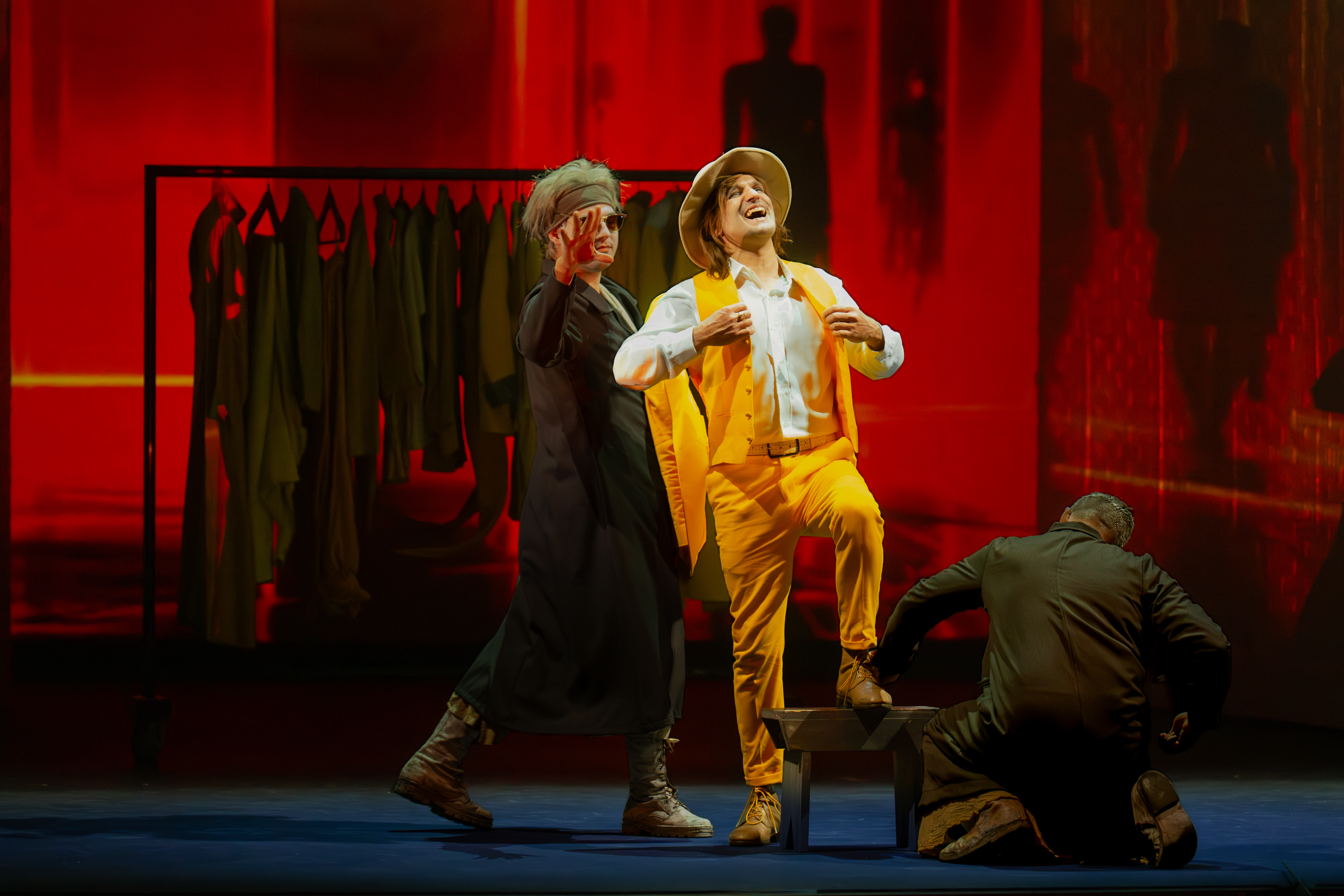
Scene from the 2024 production of Don Giovanni directed by Álvaro Brechner at Teatro Solís (Montevideo, Uruguay). The staging presents a contemporary dystopian aesthetic, with a cinematic approach to visual storytelling and actor direction.

In 2023, Brechner made his operatic debut directing a contemporary staging of Mozart's Don Giovanni at the Teatro Solís in Montevideo, performed with the Orquesta Filarmónica de Uruguay. The production, which premiered on 19 August, featured a dystopian visual approach incorporating cinematic elements and references to science fiction aesthetics. The cast was led by soprano Verónica Cangemi.

=== Advertising ===
Brechner has also worked extensively as a commercial director, developing major national advertising campaigns in Spain.

== Themes and style ==
Critics have described Brechner's cinema as a combination of psychological realism, political history and understated dark humor. His films frequently depict individuals facing extreme circumstances and explore resilience, personal identity and memory under oppressive systems. His visual approach favors restrained naturalism, performance-driven direction and meticulous sound design, particularly in A Twelve-Year Night. In recent years, he has incorporated hybrid techniques drawing from theatre and documentary filmmaking.

Brechner's work is characterized by a blend of fiction and documentary approaches, with a strong focus on character psychology and moral dilemmas. His films frequently explore themes of memory, identity, dignity and resistance to political oppression, particularly in A Twelve-Year Night.

His characters are often individuals in extreme situations who are forced to reinvent themselves—a thematic thread that connects the con artists of Bad Day to Go Fishing, the aging protagonist of Mr. Kaplan, the political prisoners of A Twelve-Year Night, and the musicians of Mägo de Oz. His narrative structures frequently center on pairs or duos under pressure.

His directorial style emphasizes restrained visual realism, meticulous sound design, and a strong focus on performance. His background in documentary filmmaking is evident in the exhaustive research process he brings to each project. In recent years, he has developed hybrid approaches that incorporate influences from theatre and documentary cinema.

== Career recognition ==
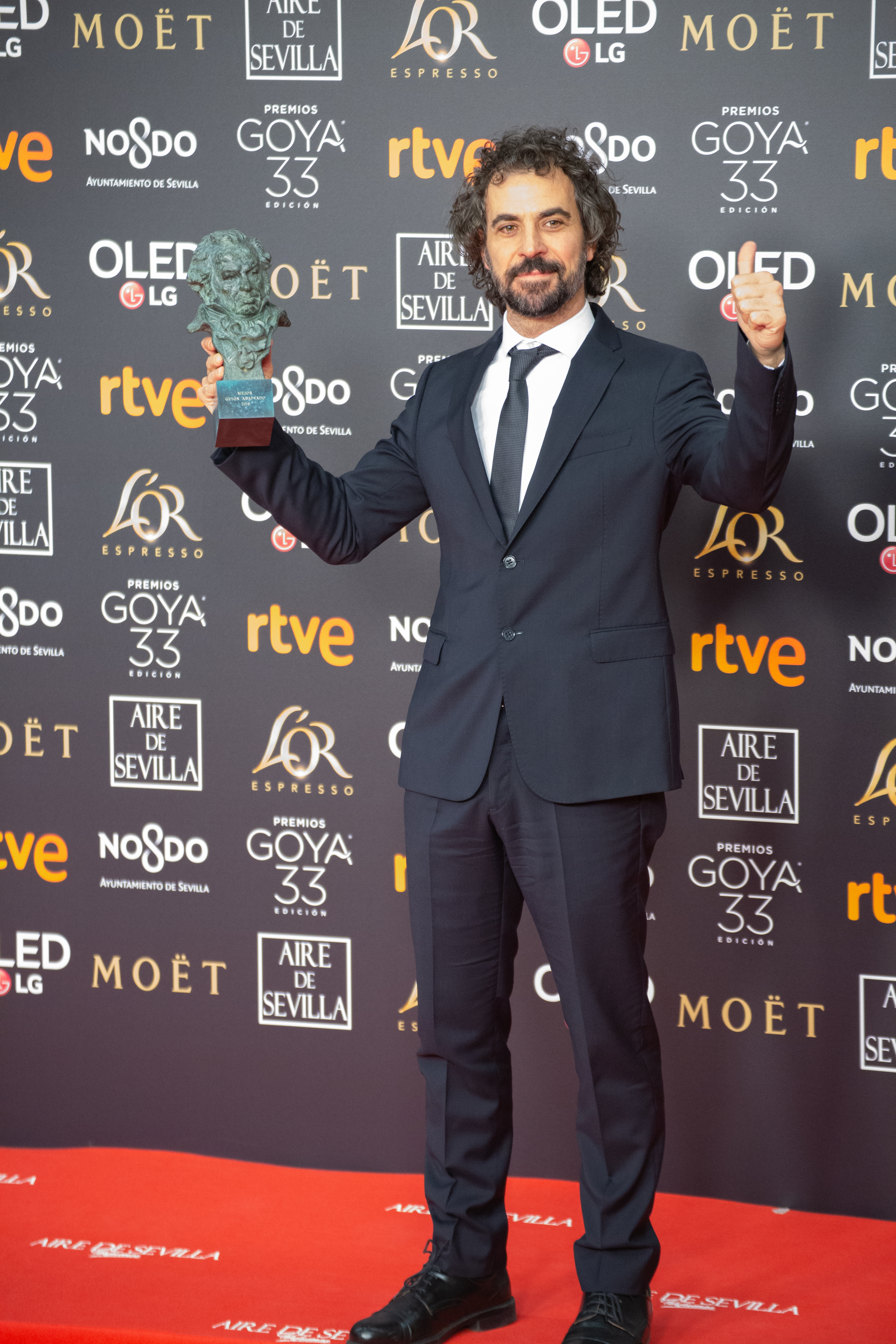
Brechner receiving the Goya Award for Best Adapted Screenplay for A Twelve-Year Night at the 33rd Goya Awards ceremony

In 2014 Brechner was highlighted by Variety as one of the Up Next 10, a list of the most interesting directors and producers emerging from Latin America. In 2017 he was one of several Latin American directors interviewed in A Companion to Latin American Cinema, which also included Alejandro González Iñárritu, Pablo Larraín, Diego Luna and Martín Rejtman.

He has received numerous distinctions, including the Goya Award for Best Adapted Screenplay, and the Faro de Honor from the Festival Internacional de Santander (2022) and two Morosoli Awards for his contribution to national culture.

== Filmography ==
=== Feature films ===
- Bad Day to Go Fishing (2009) – Director, writer, producer
- Mr. Kaplan (2014) – Director, writer
- A Twelve-Year Night (2018) – Director, writer, producer
- Mägo de Oz: The Movie (2025) – Director, writer

=== Short films ===
- The Nine Mile Walk (2003) – Director, writer, producer
- Sofía (2005) – Director, writer
- Second Anniversary (2007) – Director, writer

=== Television ===
- Amazon Prime: El Presidente: Juego de corrupción (2022), Season 2 – Director
- Netflix: La Liga: All Access (2023) – Director

=== Documentary works ===
- History Channel: La ley del ring – Director
- History Channel: Sefarad – Director
- History Channel: Testimonio de una ausencia – Director
- History Channel: Papá, por qué somos del Atleti? – Director

=== Opera ===
- Don Giovanni (2023) – Stage director, Teatro Solís (Montevideo)

== Awards and nominations ==
=== Major awards ===
Award	Category	Year	Work	Result
Goya Awards	Best Adapted Screenplay	2019	A Twelve-Year Night	Won
Goya Awards	Best Ibero-American Film	2019	A Twelve-Year Night	Nominated
Goya Awards	Best Ibero-American Film	2015	Mr. Kaplan	Nominated
Cairo International Film Festival	Golden Pyramid (Best Film)	2018	A Twelve-Year Night	Won
Cairo International Film Festival	FIPRESCI Award	2018	A Twelve-Year Night	Won
Platino Awards	Best Ibero-American Film	2019	A Twelve-Year Night	Nominated
Platino Awards	Best Director	2019	A Twelve-Year Night	Nominated
Platino Awards	Best Film	2015	Mr. Kaplan	Nominated
Platino Awards	Best Director	2015	Mr. Kaplan	Nominated
Platino Awards	Best Screenplay	2015	Mr. Kaplan	Nominated
Platino Awards	Best Cinematography	2015	Mr. Kaplan	Nominated
Platino Awards	Best Editing	2015	Mr. Kaplan	Nominated
Platino Awards	Best Sound	2015	Mr. Kaplan	Nominated
Platino Awards	Best Art Direction	2015	Mr. Kaplan	Nominated
Ariel Awards (Mexico)	Best Ibero-American Film	2015	Mr. Kaplan	Nominated
José María Forqué Awards	Best Latin American Film	2019	A Twelve-Year Night	Nominated

=== Festival awards ===
Festival	Award	Year	Work	Result
Venice Film Festival	Official Selection (Orizzonti)	2018	A Twelve-Year Night	Selected
Cannes Film Festival	Critics' Week	2009	Bad Day to Go Fishing	Selected
Berlinale Co-Production Market	ARTE International Prize	2016	A Twelve-Year Night	Won
San Sebastián International Film Festival	Co-Production Award	2016	A Twelve-Year Night	Won
Huelva Ibero-American Film Festival	Best Director	2018	A Twelve-Year Night	Won
Thessaloniki International Film Festival	Audience Award	2018	A Twelve-Year Night	Won
TorinoFilmLab	Production Award (€100,000)	2011	Mr. Kaplan	Won
TorinoFilmLab	Audience Award (€30,000)	2011	Mr. Kaplan	Won
Warsaw Film Festival	Best Film (Free Spirit)	2009	Bad Day to Go Fishing	Won
Los Angeles Latino International Film Festival	Best First Film (Opera Prima)	2009	Bad Day to Go Fishing	Won
Mar del Plata International Film Festival	Best Actor (Jouko Ahola)	2009	Bad Day to Go Fishing	Won
Mar del Plata International Film Festival	Best Ibero-American Film	2009	Bad Day to Go Fishing	Won
Austin Film Festival	Best Film	2009	Bad Day to Go Fishing	Won
Austin Film Festival	Audience Award	2009	Bad Day to Go Fishing	Won
Brooklyn Film Festival	Best Director	2009	Bad Day to Go Fishing	Won
Sofia International Film Festival	FIPRESCI Award (Best Film)	2009	Bad Day to Go Fishing	Won
Fribourg International Film Festival	Special Jury Award	2009	Bad Day to Go Fishing	Won
Fribourg International Film Festival	Audience Award	2009	Bad Day to Go Fishing	Won
Fribourg International Film Festival	Ecumenical Award	2009	Bad Day to Go Fishing	Won

=== Critics' awards ===
Organization	Award	Year	Work	Result
Uruguayan Film Critics (FIPRESCI)	Best Film	2018	A Twelve-Year Night	Won
Uruguayan Film Critics (FIPRESCI)	Best Film, Best Director, Best Screenplay, Best International Film Debut (10 total)	2009	Bad Day to Go Fishing	Won
CEC Cinema Writers Circle (Spain)	Best Screenplay	2019	A Twelve-Year Night	Won
CEC Cinema Writers Circle (Spain)	Best Film	2010	Bad Day to Go Fishing	Nominated
CEC Cinema Writers Circle (Spain)	Best Screenplay	2010	Bad Day to Go Fishing	Nominated
