= Bad Day to Go Fishing =

- Film poster
- Directed by: Álvaro Brechner
- Screenplay by: Álvaro Brechner; Gary Piquer
- Based on: Jacob y el otro by Juan Carlos Onetti
- Produced by: Álvaro Brechner; Tomás Cimadevilla; Virginia Hinze; Gary Piquer
- Starring: Gary Piquer; Jouko Ahola; Antonella Costa; César Troncoso; Roberto Pankow; Bruno Aldecosea
- Cinematography: Álvaro Gutiérrez
- Edited by: Teresa Font
- Music by: Mikel Salas
- Production companies: Baobab Films; Expresso Films; Telespan 2000
- Distributed by: Vértice 360 (Spain); Bavaria Film (International)
- Release date: 2009 (Cannes Film Festival)
- Running time: 100 minutes
- Countries: Uruguay; Spain
- Language: Spanish

Bad Day to Go Fishing (original title, Mal día para pescar) is a 2009 comedy-drama film directed by Álvaro Brechner from a screenplay he co-wrote with Gary Piquer. It stars Piquer, Jouko Ahola, Antonella Costa and Cesar Troncoso. It was screened as part of the official selection of the Critics Week at 2009 Cannes Film Festival.

The screenplay was written by Álvaro Brechner in collaboration with Gary Piquer, and was adapted from a short story by the Uruguayan writer Juan Carlos Onetti.

The film tells the story of a strongman and his crafty manager, who tour small South American towns staging wrestling matches. Arriving in Santa Maria, they are met with uncommon enthusiasm by the locals, snowballing into a major challenge to their livelihood and their friendship.

== Plot ==
Jacob van Oppen, an East German who is the former strongest man on earth, and his manager Orsini, a scrawny yet dapper businessman who calls himself "the Prince," makes a good living by travelling around small South American towns and organizing wrestling exhibitions in run-down theaters. Jacob van Oppen is an uncontrollable titan of impressive dimensions who can only be appeased by the soft soothing melody of "Lili Marleen." Once this oddball pair disembark at the village of Santa Maria (in an unspecified country), business really kicks off: the local newspaper is immediately gung-ho on sponsoring the fight, helping hands placard posters announcing the big event and putting an open call for a worthy adversary. Ever so resourceful, Orsini knows how to find the right combatant, but fishing in Santa Maria could lead to a bigger catch than he'd hoped for... Although the cunning editor of the local newspaper is convinced to have sniffed out Orsini's secret, he very well might be on a false track...

== Cast ==
- Gary Piquer as Prince Orsini
- Jouko Ahola as Jacob van Oppen
- Antonella Costa as Adriana
- César Troncoso as Heber
- Roberto Pankow as el Turco
- Bruno Aldecosea as Diaz Grey

== Reception ==
Bad Day to Go Fishing premiered at the Critic's Week of the 2009 Cannes Film Festival.

It was the Uruguayan candidate for the Academy Award for Best Foreign Language Film.

The film won several international awards and has participated in many prestigious film festivals such as 26th Warsaw International Film Festival (Best Film Free Spirit Comp.), Montreal World Film Festival, Los Angeles Latino International Film Festival (Best Film Opera Prima), Mar del Plata Film Festival (Best Actor), Moscow International Film Festival, Shanghai International Film Festival, Austin (Best Film & Audience Award), Brooklyn (Best Director), Sofia International Film Festival (Best Film Fipresci), São Paulo, Busan International Film Festival and Palm Springs International Film Festival.

The film won 10 Uruguay Fipresci Critics Awards, including Best Film, Best International Film Debut, Best Director, Best Screenplay and Best Actor and got nominated for Best Film, Best Screenplay and Best Actor by the Spanish Critics (CEC).
