= Disorder (2009 film) =

- Directed by: Huang Weikai
- Distributed by: dGenerate Films
- Release date: 2009
- Running time: 58 minutes
- Country: China
- Language: Mandarin

Disorder is a 2009 Chinese documentary film directed by Huang Weikai (Chinese: 黄伟凯; pinyin: Huáng Wěikǎi) and distributed by dGenerate Films.

== Synopsis ==
Huang Weikai assembles footage from a dozen amateur videographers and weaves them into a unique symphony of urban social dysfunction.
