= 32nd Moscow International Film Festival =

- Festival poster
- Location: Moscow, Russia
- Founded: 1959
- Awards: Grand Prix
- Festival date: 17–26 June 2010
- Website: Website

The 32nd Moscow International Film Festival was held from 17 to 26 June 2010. The Golden George was awarded to the Venezuelan drama film Hermano directed by Marcel Rasquin.

== Jury ==
- Luc Besson (France – President of the Jury)
- Catalina Saavedra (Chile)
- Veit Heiduschka (Germany)
- Mariya Mironova (Russia)
- Šarūnas Bartas (Lithuania)

== Films in competition ==
The following films were selected for the main competition:

English title	Original title	Director(s)	Production country
The Albanian	Der Albaner	Johannes Naber	Germany, Albania
Brother	Hermano	Marcel Rasquin	Venezuela
Boxhagener Platz	Boxhagener Platz	Matti Geschonneck	Germany
Drifting	A la deriva	Ventura Pons	Spain
Sparrow	Vorobey	Yuri Shiller	Russia
Brought by the Sea	Denizden gelen	Nesli Çölgeçen	Turkey
An Earthly Paradise For The Eyes	Zemský ráj to napohled	Irena Pavlásková	Czech Republic
Cole	Cole	Carl Bessai	Canada
The Last Report on Anna	Utolsó jelentés Annáról	Márta Mészáros	Hungary
Different Mothers	Despre alte mame	Mihai lonesku and Tiberiu Iordan	Romania
Little Rose	Rozyczka	Jan Kidawa-Błoński	Poland
Footsteps in the Sand	Stupki v Pyasuka	Ivailo Hristov	Bulgaria
The Cameramurderer	Der Kameramörder	Robert-Adrian Pejo	Austria, Hungary, Switzerland
Enlightenment Film	Gye-Mong Young-Hwa	Dong-hoon Park	South Korea
It Begins with the End	Ça commence par la fin	Michael Cohen	France
Dear Alice	För kärleken	Othman Karim	Sweden
Solemn Promise	Besa	Srđan Karanović	Serbia, Slovenia, France, Hungary, Croatia

== Awards ==
- Golden George: Hermano by Marcel Rasquin
- Special Jury Prize: Silver George: The Albanian by Johannes Naber
- Silver George:
  - Best Director: Jan Kidawa-Błoński for Little Rose
  - Best Actor: Nik Xhelilaj for The Albanian
  - Best Actress: Vilma Cibulková for An Earthly Paradise For The Eyes
- Silver George for the best film of the Perspective competition: Rewers by Borys Lankosz
- Lifetime Achievement Award: Claude Lelouch
- Stanislavsky Award: Emmanuelle Béart
