= Huelva Ibero-American Film Festival =

Film festival in Spain

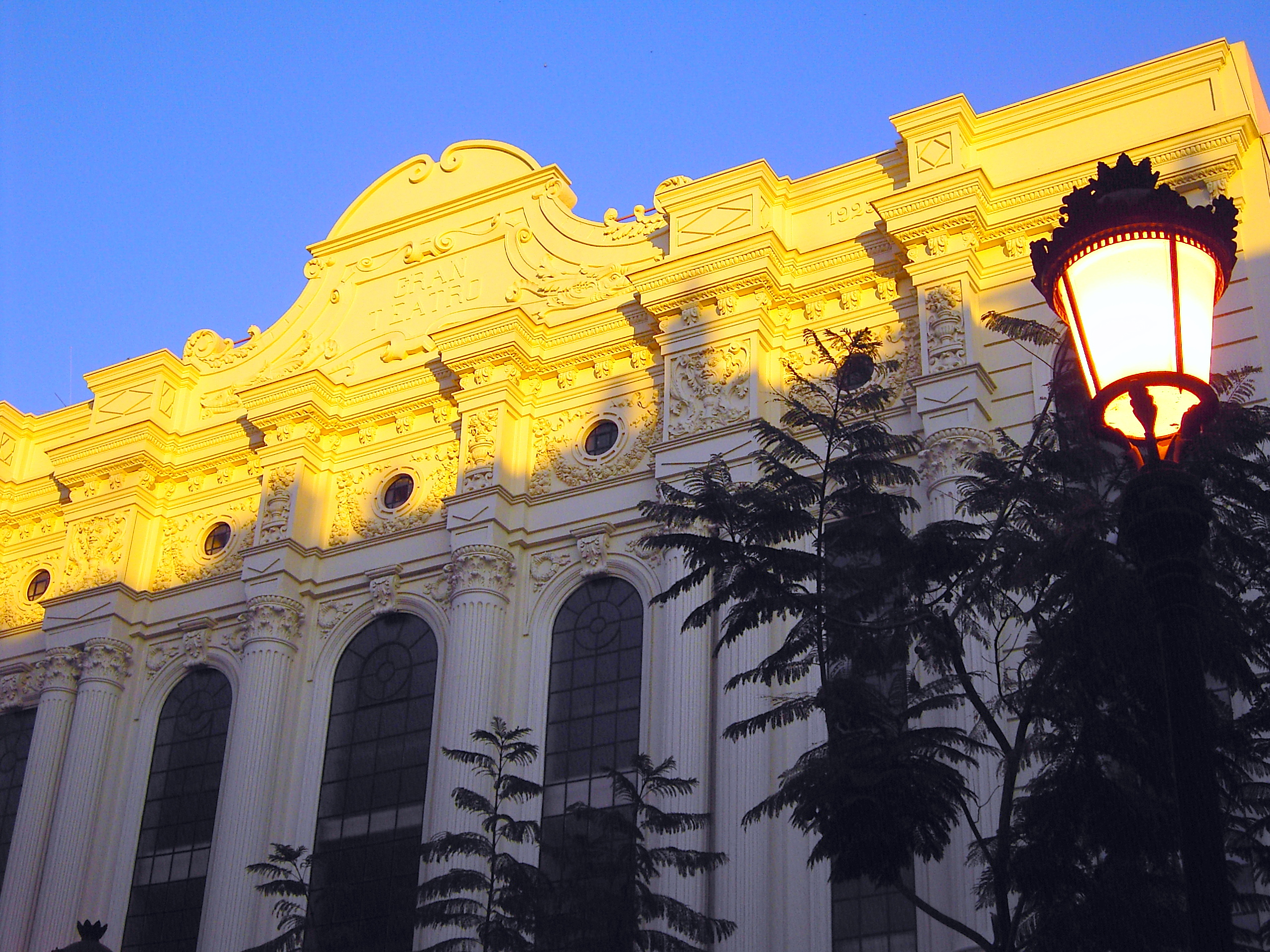
- The Gran Teatro de Huelva
- Location: Huelva, Spain
- Language: Spanish, Portuguese
- Website: http://www.festicinehuelva.com/

The Huelva Ibero-American Film Festival (Spanish: Festival de Cine Iberoamericano de Huelva) is the oldest film festival in Europe dedicated to the Ibero-American cinema. It has been held since 1975 in Huelva, Spain.

During the first editions, it was known as Semana de Cine Iberoamericano (transl. Ibero-American Film Week). The festival was originally organised by a private entity, the Cine-Club Huelva. Upon the creation of the governing Fundación del Festival de Cine Iberoamericano de Huelva, and the ensuing constitution of the board of trustees, the festival is primarily funded by the Ayuntamiento de Huelva, the Provincial Deputation of Huelva, the Junta of Andalusia and the Spanish Ministry of Culture, as well as a number of private donors.

The festival is chiefly publicly funded. The grand prize is the "Golden Columbus" (Colón de Oro) for best feature. Other awards include best director, best male lead, best female lead, best script, best photography and best short film.

== Winners of the Golden Columbus ==
Year	Film	Director(s)	Country	Ref
1975	Enough Praying (Ya no basta con rezar)	Aldo Francia	Chile	
1976	The Last Supper (La última cena)	Tomás Gutiérrez Alea	Cuba	
1976	The Traitors (Los traidores)	Raymundo Gleyzer	Argentina	
1977	Cantata de Chile	Humberto Solás	Cuba	
1978	A Summer Rain (Chuvas de Verão)	Carlos Diegues	Brazil	
1978	Moonlight Serenade (Serenata a la luz de la luna)	Carles Jover, Josep Salgot	Spain	
1979	Julio Begins in July (Julio comienza en julio)	Silvio Caiozzi	Chile	
1980	The Fault (A culpa)	António Victorino de Almeida	Portugal	
1980	The Widow of Montiel (La viuda de Montiel)	Miguel Littin	Mexico	
1981	Cerromaior	Luís Filipe Rocha	Portugal	
1982	Last Days of the Victim (Últimos días de la víctima)	Adolfo Aristarain	Argentina	
1983	Burning Patience (Ardiente paciencia)	Antonio Skármeta	Chile	
1984	Murder in the Senate (Asesinato en el Senado de la Nación)	Juan José Jusid	Argentina	
1984	The Children of the War (Los chicos de la guerra)	Bebe Kamin	Argentina	
1985	The Rigorous Fate (El rigor del destino)	Gerardo Vallejo	Argentina	
1986	Poor Butterfly (Pobre mariposa)	Raúl de la Torre	Argentina	
1987	Besame Mucho	Francisco Ramalho	Brazil	
1988	The Neighbor's Wife (A mulher do próximo)	José Fonseca e Costa	Portugal	
1989	Juliana	Fernando Espinosa, Alejandro Legaspi	Peru	
1990	After the Storm (Después de la tormenta)	Tristán Bauer	Argentina	
1991	The Tombs (Las tumbas)	Javier Torre	Argentina	
1992	Adorable Lies (Adorables mentiras)	Gerardo Chijona	Cuba	
1992	Dream Kiss (El beso del sueño)	Rafael Moreno Alba	Spain	
1993	The Strategy of the Snail (La estrategia del caracol)	Sergio Cabrera	Colombia	
1994	Queen and King (Reina y Rey)	Julio García Espinosa	Cuba	
1995	Sicario	José Ramón Novoa	Venezuela	
1996	Como un relámpago	Miguel Hermoso	Spain	
1997	How Angels Are Born (Como Nascem os Anjos)	Murillo Salles	Brazil	
1998	Treason (Traição)	Arthur Fortes, Claudio Torres, José Enrique Fonseca	Brazil	
1999	Olympic Garage (Garage Olimpo)	Marco Bechis	Argentina	
2000	Coronation (Coronación)	Silvio Caiozzi	Chile	
2001	In This Tricky Life (En la puta vida)	Beatriz Flores Silva	Uruguay	
2002	Madame Satã	Karim Aïnouz	Brazil	
2003	A Trip to the Seaside (El viaje hacia el mar)	Guillermo Casanova	Uruguay	
2004	Whisky	Juan Pablo Rebella, Pablo Stoll	Uruguay	
2005	Lower City (Cidade Baixa)	Sérgio Machado	Brazil	
2006	The Violin (El violín)	Francisco Vargas	Mexico	
2007	Silent Light (Luz silenciosa)	Carlos Reygadas	Mexico	
2008	The Good Life (La buena vida)	Andrés Wood	Chile	
2009	The Maid (La Nana)	Sebastián Silva	Chile	
2010	Hermano	Marcel Rasquin	Venezuela	
2011	I'd Receive the Worst News from Your Beautiful Lips (Eu Receberia as Piores Notícias dos Seus Lindos Lábios)	Beto Brant, Renato Ciasca	Brazil	
2012	Clandestine Childhood (Infancia clandestina)	Benjamín Ávila		
2013	Workers	José Luis Valle	Mexico	
2014	Zanahoria (Detrás de la verdad)	Enrique Buchichio	Uruguay, Argentina	
2015	Magallanes	Salvador del Solar	Peru, Argentina, Spain	
2016	Pizarro	Simón Hernández	Colombia	
2017	The Desert Bride (La novia del desierto)	Cecilia Atán, Valeria Pivato	Argentina, Chile	
2018	Miriam Lies (Miriam miente)	Natalia Cabral, Oriol Estrada	Dominican Republic, Spain	
2019	Song Without a Name (Canción sin nombre)	Melina León	Spain, Peru	
2020	The Lunchroom (Planta permanente)	Ezequiel Radusky	Argentina, Uruguay	
2021	The Other Tom (El otro Tom)	Rodrigo Plá, Laura Santullo	Mexico, United States	
2022	Blanquita	Fernando Guzzoni	Chile	
2023	Valentina or the Serenity (Valentina o la serenidad)	Ángeles Cruz	Mexico	
2024	Portrait of a Certain Orient (Retrato de um certo Oriente)	Marcelo Gomes	Brazil	
