= La Rábida High School =

High school in Huelva, Spain

Institute of Secondary Education La Rábida
- Instituto de Educación Secundaria La Rábida
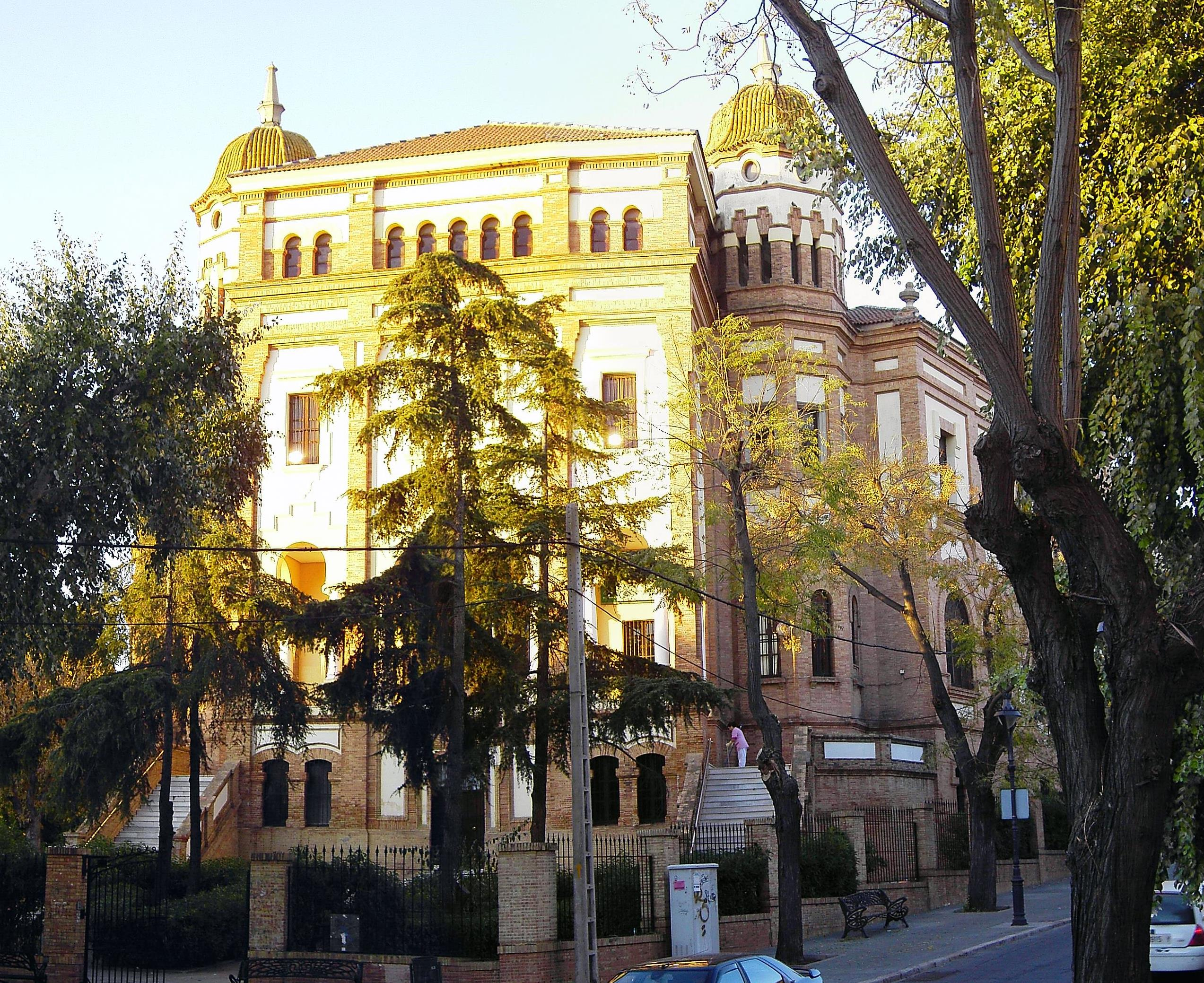
- Established: June 13, 1856
- Director: Juan Antonio Moreno Caro
- Academic staff: 60
- Students: 1000
- Location: Huelva, Spain; 37.2639°N 6.9485°W
- Website: http://www.iesrabida.es/

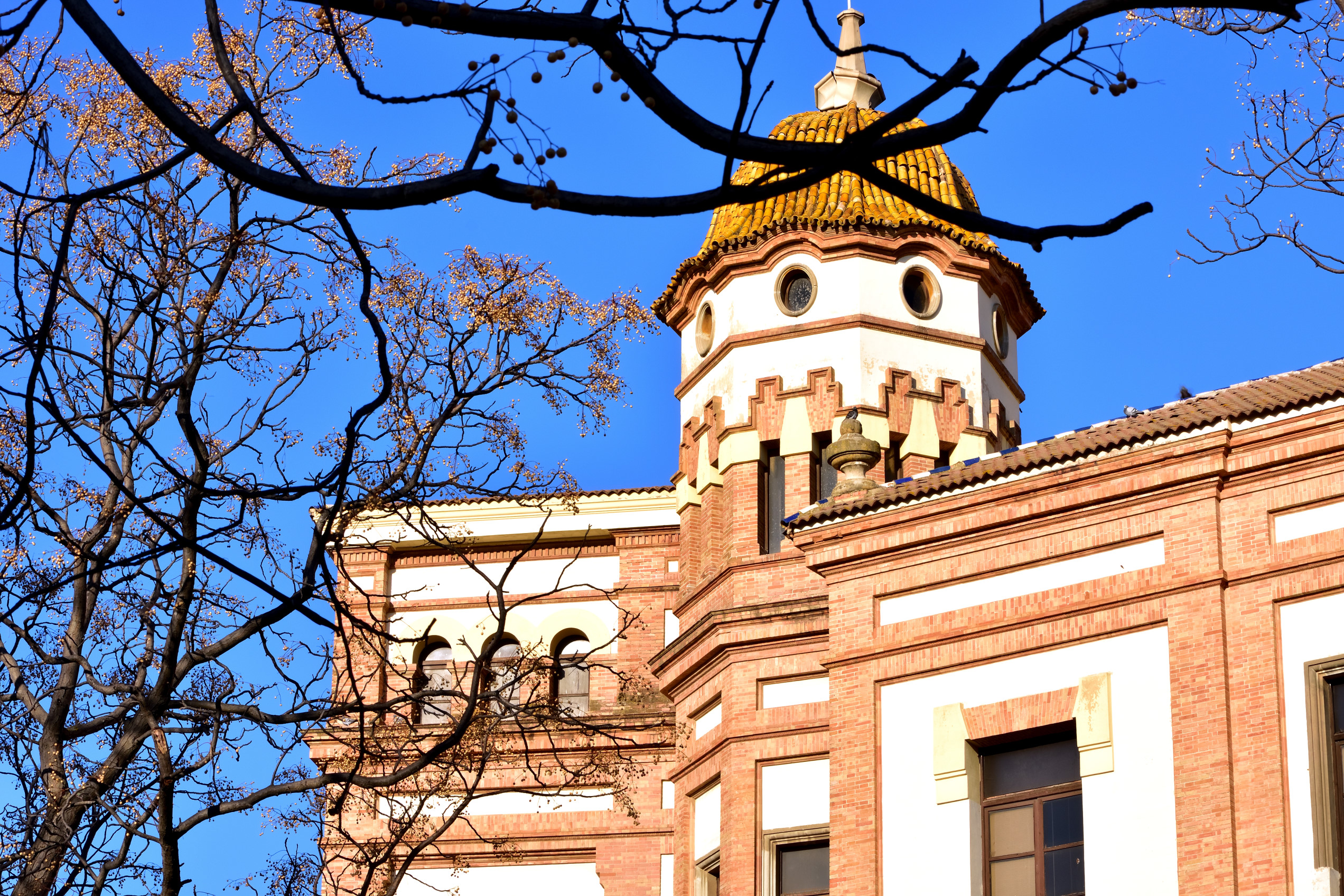
La Rabida High School. Corner of the south-east facade.

La Rábida High School is a public educational center located in the city of Huelva, Andalusia, Spain. It is among the region's most historic secondary schools at more than 170 years old, and is considered a benchmark in education throughout the province. The center staffs 60 teachers and enrolls more than 1000 students.

== History ==
The Institute of Secondary Education "La Rábida" was founded by the Royal Order of June 13, 1856 during the reign of Isabel II, and was officially inaugurated in October of the same year by the Civil Governor of Huelva, Adolfo de Castro, with Vicente Rodríguez García serving as its first director. Throughout its history it has occupied several buildings, the first of which was the Convent of San Francisco, which is now the Church of the Jesuits, followed by Convent of La Merced, now a University, known locally as the Old Institute. It moved to its current location on Avenue Manuel Siurot during the 1933-34 academic year.

The building, designed by architect José María Peréz Carasa, is highly unique in its style, presenting features of many styles that were fashionable at the time including historicism, modernisme, and neo-gothicism. Its design further reflects the era in which it was built, when architecture began to hold its functionality as a stronger part of its identity. It is among the best examples of the work of this unique architect, who worked to fit the building to its particular site on top of one of the city's major hills.

Notable graduates from La Rabida include:

- Antonia Arrobas y Pérez, the first woman who officially enrolled in secondary education in Spain. Born in Talavera la Real, the daughter of a carpenter and a housewife, she applied to take an examination at the Huelva high school to validate the studies she had completed privately. At the time, educational legislation did not consider women as capable or deserving of education, and only with the support of Krausist relatives within the school was her application referred up to the rector of the University of Seville and to the general director of Public Instructions, who finally granted her permission.
- Juan Ramón Jiménez, Spanish poet winner of the Nobel Prize for Literature in 1956.

The school served as a royal residence for the visit of King Alfonso XII to the city in 1882.

In 1903, the first meteorological station of Huelva and its province was established at the institute. It was directed by teachers of the center, who recorded the first official climate data available in the city and province. The center also oversaw the development of the first worker/professional educational programs in Huelva.

La Rábida Institute is distinguished as a Historical Educational Institute of Andalusia, recognized as part of a Network of Historical Educational Institutes of Andalusia which share resources, experiences, initiatives, and disseminate their history through educational projects.

In addition, La Rábida Institute is a member of the Order of Alfonso X El Sabio (educational award) for its educational work, becoming the only one in the province and one of just thirteen centers in Andalusia. This distinction was awarded by the Ministry of Education and the Royal House in February 2022.

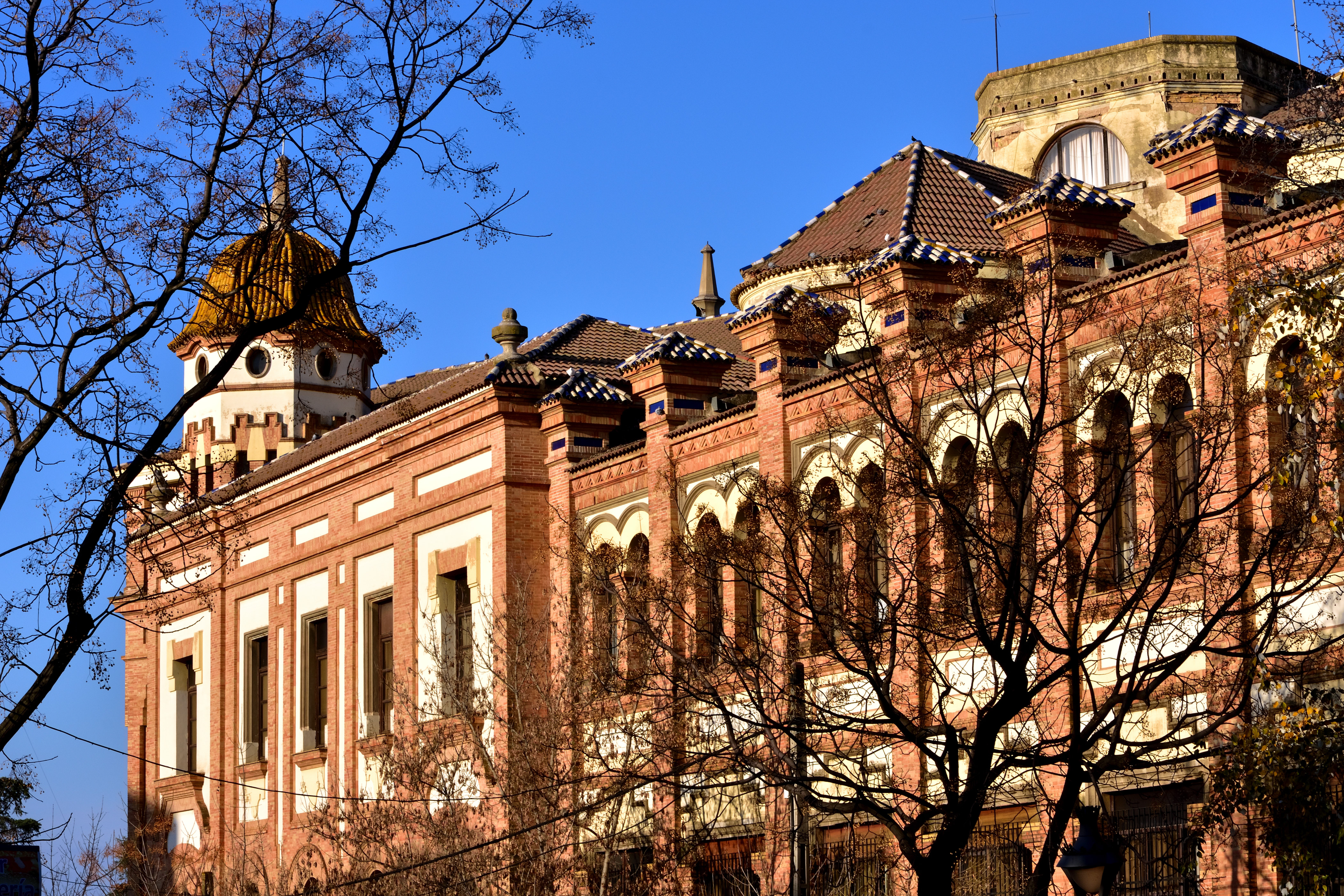
La Rábida High School, eastern facade.

== Teaching ==
In the center the following educational levels are taught:

- Compulsory Secondary Education (E.S.O.)
- Adult Secondary Education (E.S.A.)
- Bachillerato (Daytime and Semipresencial for adults)
- Higher Education Training Cycles (from the Hospitality and Tourism Family)

== Chronology and controversies of the reform ==
=== 2000-2017 ===
Since 2000 approximately, there is a project for the modernization work of the center. This action of the Regional Government of Andalusia would provide the center with a new gymnasium and would provide its facilities respecting its patrimonial protection.

This comprehensive reform of the institute has been waiting for both teachers and students of the center since 2000, arising year after year rumors that "the works will be undertaken the next course." Due to the great reform it would mean, during this time, it would not be possible to teach the classes in the center, so therefore, an alternative place should be sought until the works are finished, but it is still unknown where it would be.

Before the beginning of the works in 2020 (definitive date), there were many meetings with politicians and high officials of Education for several consecutive years. One of them was in 2014: On December 2, 2014, the territorial delegate for Education, Vicente Zarza, explained that this reform would have a budget of almost 8 million euros, with the aim of drafting the project "that equips the center with of facilities appropriate to their typology”. Despite the announcement, no definitive project was awarded, much less the beginning of the works.

=== 2017-2020 ===
On February 28, 2017, Vicente Zarza announced that the Andalusian Government had allocated almost 400,000 euros to project drafting and geotechnical study services for the modernization work of La Rábida High School. The delegate expressed the importance of this highly relevant action for the city, "preceded by a complex administrative process and which is gradually materializing". Once again, everything was left up in the air and there was nothing definitive.

On October 17, 2017, a plan for the evacuation of the Bachillerato and the ESO was carried out due to the heavy rains suffered throughout the morning, which flooded all the corridors and classrooms of the High School, claiming once again the necessary action of the reform that the center needs.

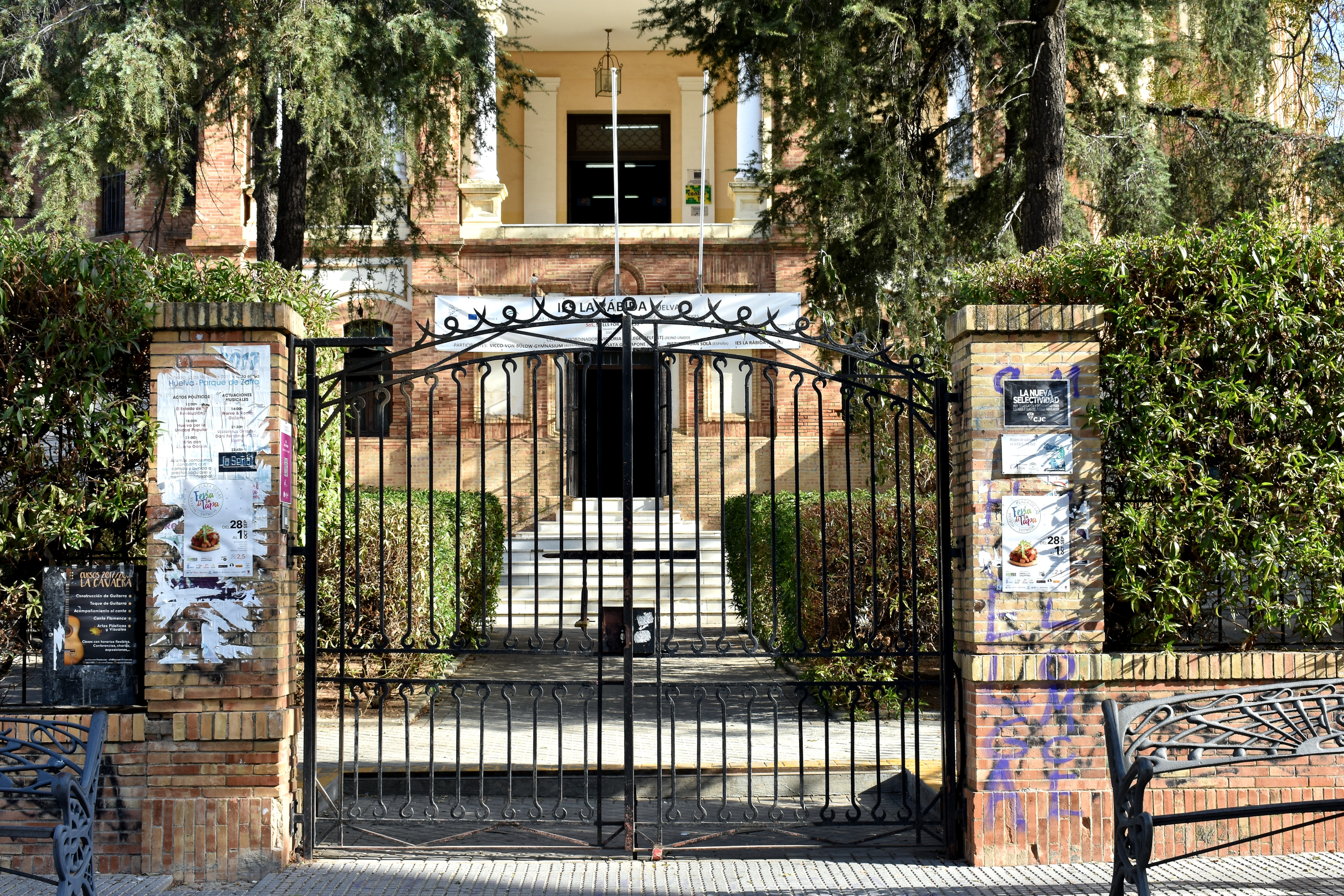
La Rábida High School. Gate of the main facade.

On November 9, 2017, the educational center was the subject of debate in the Andalusian Parliament due to its reform. The popular parliamentarian Guillermo García asked the Education Commission of the Andalusian Parliament the start date of the works to the responsible of Education in Andalusia, Sonia Gaya, who responded by arguing that the Andalusian Government had not have deadlines set yet to begin the reform, and insisted that the execution periods depend on the development of the administrative and contracting procedures that are associated with an action of this magnitude.

On November 11, 2017, 'Huelva Información's newspaper published an article explaining the discontent that existed both in the educational center and in the rest of Huelva society with the words of the responsible of Education from 2 days ago. After 15 years of waiting, Education did not know when the works would begin.

On January 23, 2018, the delegate of the Government of the Andalusian Government in Huelva, Francisco José Romero, and the territorial delegate of Education, Vicente Zarza, offered the main data and the lines of action in the improvement of the school infrastructures of the province, within the framework of the Infrastructure and Equipment Plan for non-university education of Education. In this plan, the largest amount was taken by La Rábida High School with a total of 7,454,700 euros. However, no deadline was given on this date either.

On February 12, 2018, the representative of all the students of La Rábida High School and delegate of the educational center, Gonzalo López Castilla, attended the meeting of the Provincial School Council, held in the Delegation of Education of Huelva. In this meeting, the delegate alleged that the institute had many shortcomings, such as constant power cuts and water, malfunctioning heating, flooding, etc., not meeting the necessary conditions of a teaching center. He asked to Tania González, the president of the table (Head of planning and education in Huelva), if the dates of the beginning of the works would be finally known. Finally, she did not know how to answer, having no idea about when the remodeling of the institute will begin.

On March 25, 2019, the Andalusian Public Education Agency of the Ministry of Education of Junta de Andalucía, gives the green light to the study in detail covering the area of the land plots on La Rábida High School and Diego de Guzmán y Quesada High School. The objective would be to modify the layout of the open spaces in this area by building a new gym on the plot of the La Rábida Institute, relocating the car park space for the teachers of the center; as well as the construction of a transformation center in the plot corresponding to the Diego de Guzmán y Quesada Institute.

=== 2020 - present ===
On June 5, 2020, is a definitive date: the Andalusian Minister of Education, Javier Imbroda, presented the award of the Andalusian Government on the works of the institute for 6.2 million euros. Imbroda assured that the action will have an execution period of 26 months and will consist of the comprehensive reform, expansion and modernization of the Huelva institute, respecting patrimonial protection at all times. Thus, on a visit to the educational center, Imbroda has indicated that the award is part of an amount of 6,265,001.06 euros. The Andalusian Ministerio stressed that these works will provide the center with adequate facilities for the teachings it provides and will allow "restoring the damage that has accumulated in the building over the years." Adding the project writing fees and the planned equipment endowment, the performance exceeds 6.9 million euros of investment.

On August 15, 2020, prefabricated classrooms were placed in the facilities outside the center to be able to teach classes in them during the works. Most classes are currently being taught (course 2021/2022) in these prefabricated classrooms. However, due to the number of students, there are other courses (only 'Bachillerato') that are being taught at 'CEIP Tres Carabelas', as La Rábida High School made known through a statement on its social networks.

On August 24, 2020, the comprehensive reform began and from this day, the center is immersed in a profound remodeling, with the performance having an execution period of 26 months. The website of the DIAZ CUBERO construction company frequently publishes the update of the works with audiovisual content.

On January 14, 2022, the Andalusian Minister of Education, Javier Imbroda, visited the works of the center to see the pace they were taking and announced that the comprehensive reform of the institute was 55% complete, ensuring that the reopening of the educational center will be the following September 21, 2022, coinciding with the start of the next school year 2022/2023.

== Explanation of the reform ==
The rehabilitation of La Rábida High School (that is being undertaken by the public company DIAZ CUBERO) is using materials that are related to the author's original conception, differentiating two areas of action: existing building and new gymnasium.

The execution of the works is proposed in two execution phases, which currently allows the center's teaching activity to continue in prefabricated classrooms during the first phase.

=== Phase 1 ===
In phase 1 (in which the project is currently) the prefabricated classrooms were installed (in which teaching is now taking place) and the comprehensive reform of the existing building is being carried out.

Once the provisional classrooms were installed and refurbished, work began inside the building. Actions are being carried out such as demolition of existing false ceilings, review of the state of the floors, as well as their propping, non-structural interior demolitions, demolition of existing floors in contact with the ground, new buried sanitation networks, demolitions structural (forging of the gallery, forging of the music room and the semi-basement staircase), assembly of the tubular scaffolding on the facades and roofs of the building, structural reinforcements, disassembly of the tiled roofs, assembly of pinnacles manufactured in the workshop, restoration of the facades, works inside the building, cladding and interior partitions, installations, cladding and carpentry, exterior urbanization works, reinforced concrete floor, execution of the pavements, cladding and placement of the furniture foreseen in the project.

=== Phase 2 ===
Phase 2 will start with the beginning of the phase 1 urbanization works, as well as the final works of installations and finishes inside the main building.

During this phase, the dismantling of the prefabricated modules of the classrooms and their provisional facilities will be carried out, the pavements of the sports court will be replaced and demolitions will be carried out in the urbanization of walls and floors. On the other hand, the excavation of land will begin for the execution of the foundation of the new gym.

The area, once the works are finished, will be made up of: gymnasium, transformation center, administration area (archive, offices, counselor's office, teachers' room and toilets), cafeteria, seminars, multifunctional room, library, secondary classrooms, high school classrooms, laboratories, multipurpose classrooms, management classrooms, new covered porch, and 2 sports courts.

Through this action, the different floors of the building will be redistributed to improve its functionality, while maintaining the original design scheme, as reported by the Board. Also, the current assembly hall will be converted for use as a multifunctional room, so that it can host conferences, study/library space and projections. Work will also be done on the institute's archive, whose funds have a high documentary and historical value, to facilitate access for the study and consultation of documents and provide it with fire protection systems.

This action, which has European co-financing through the European Regional Development Fund (Feder), is included in the Plan for Investments in Educational Infrastructures of the Andalusian Ministry of Education and Sport, which is executed through the Andalusian Public Education Agency.

== Multimedia gallery of the High School ==
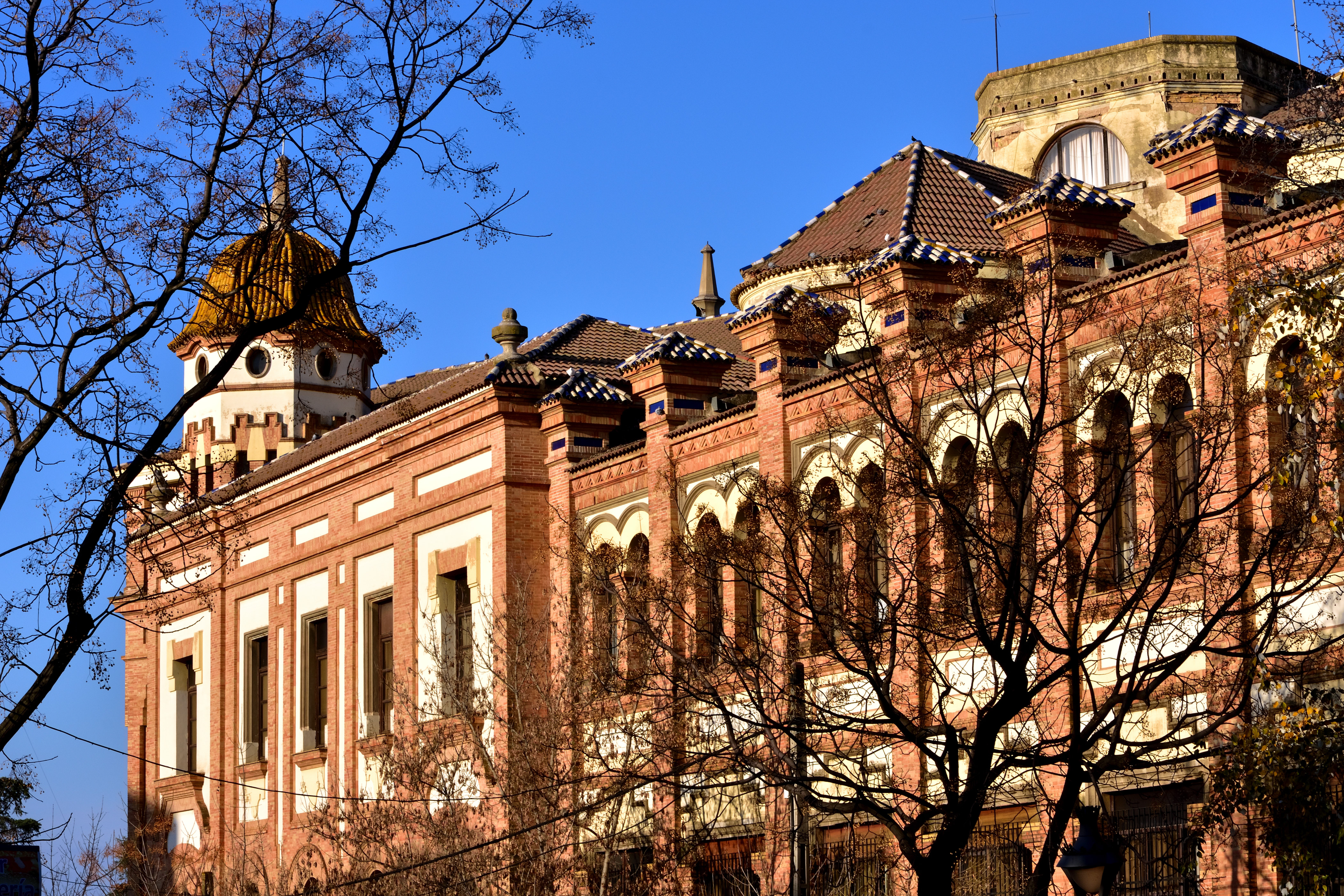
La Rábida High School, eastern facade

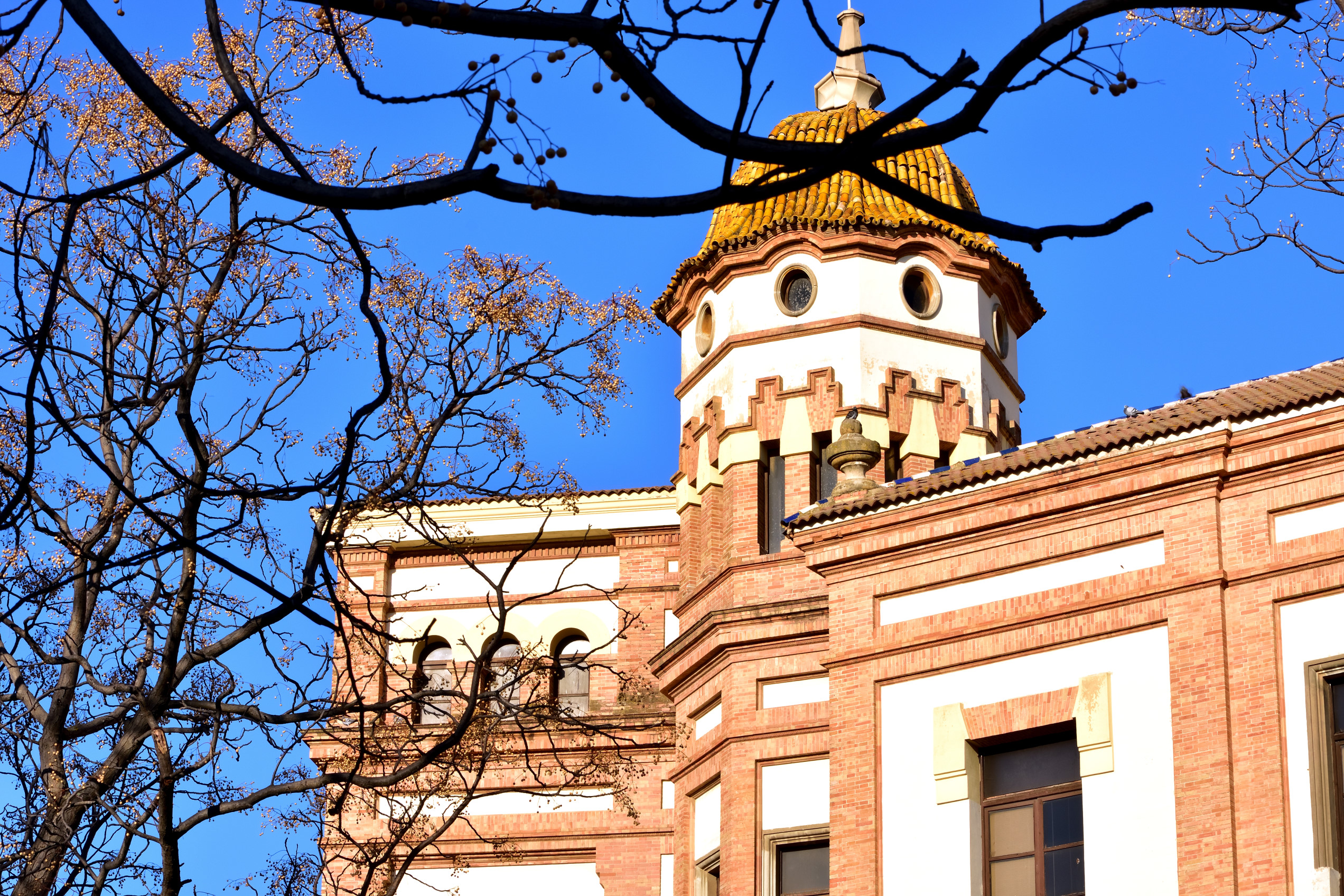
La Rábida High School

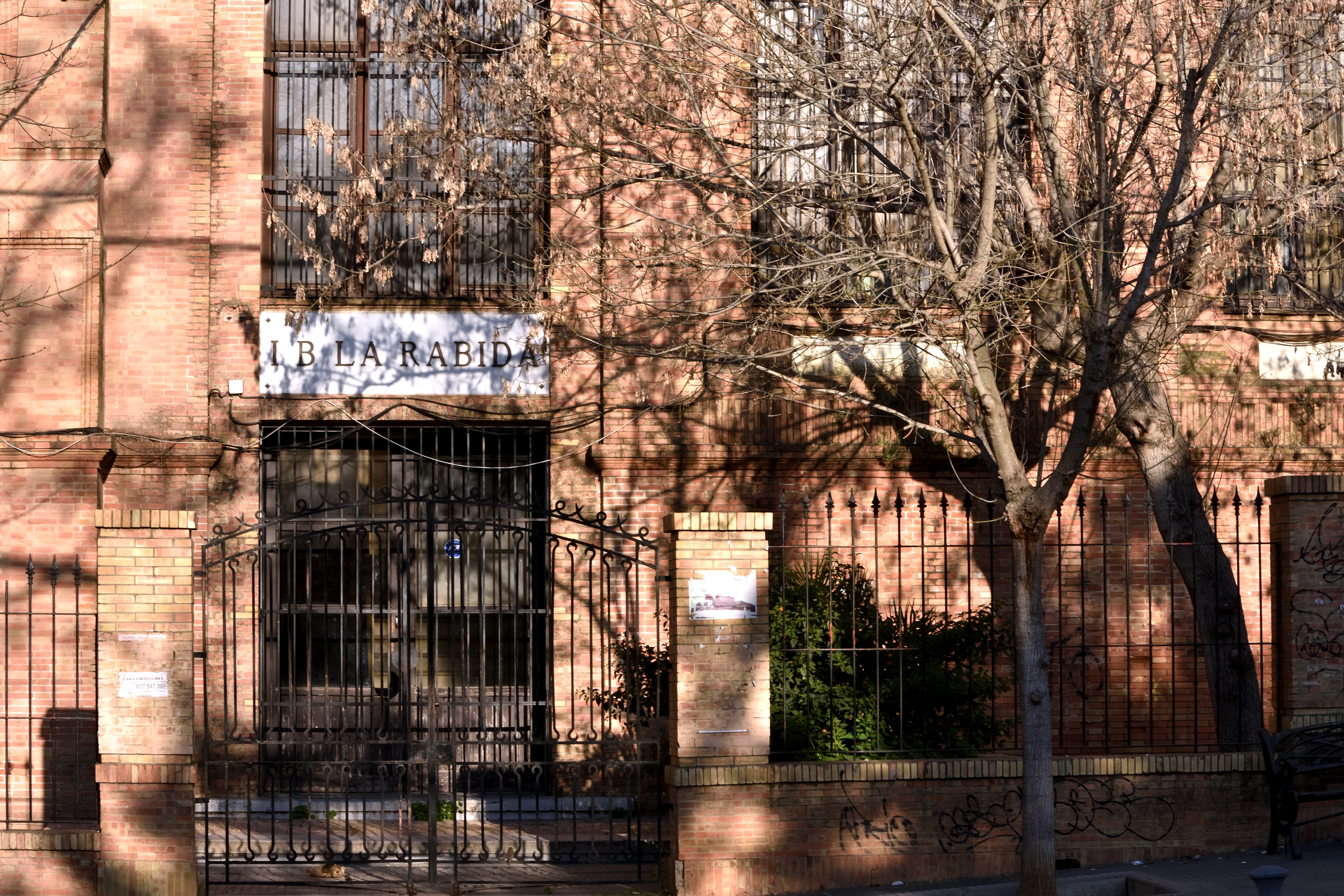
La Rábida High School, door in Avenida Manuel Siurot

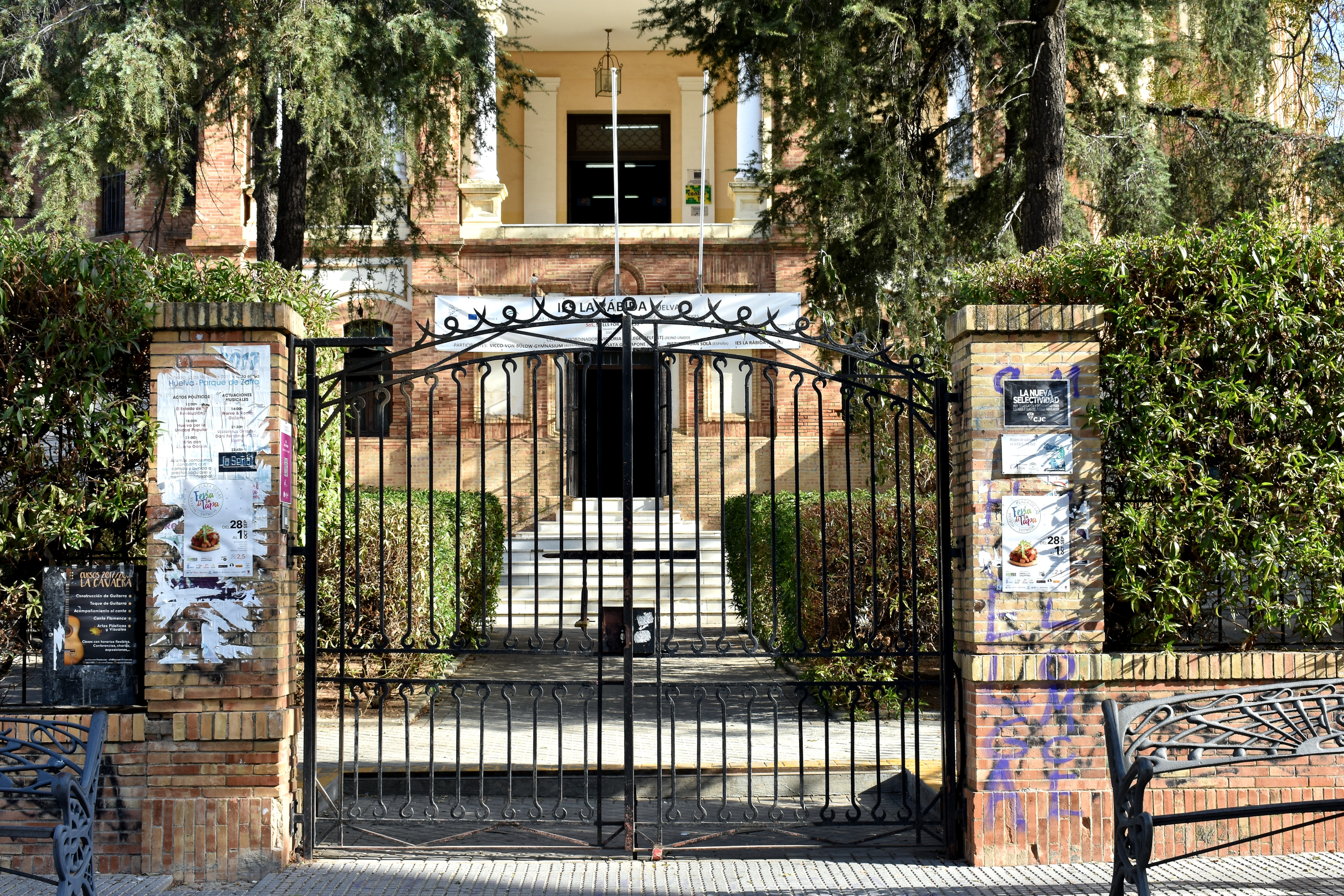
Gate of the main facade

== Bibliography ==
- GONZÁLEZ MARQUEZ, Juan Antonio (2007). Diputación Provincial de Huelva, ed. El Instituto La Rábida. 150 años de Educación y Cultura en Huelva. ISBN 978-84-8163-427-3.
