= Vilma Cibulková =

Czech actress

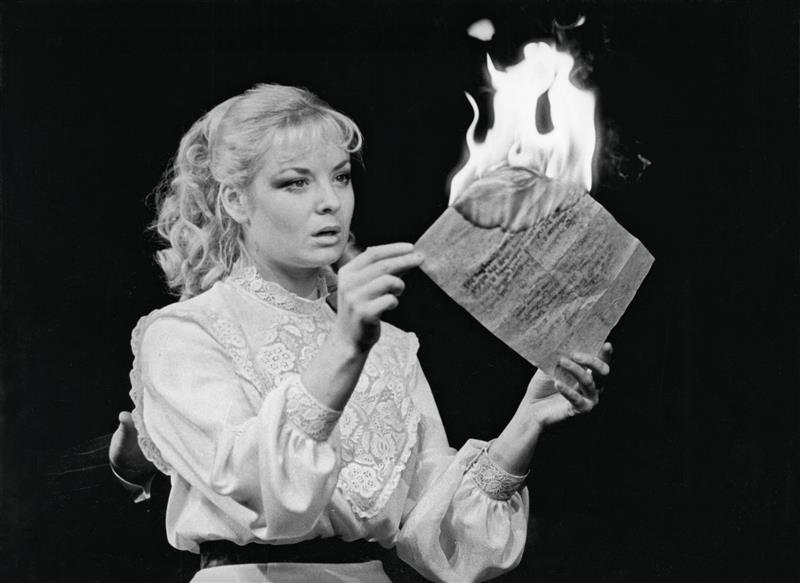
- Cibulková as Kristina in The Makropulos Secret, National Theatre, 1985
- Born: 26 March 1963 (age 61); Ostrov, Czechoslovakia
- Occupation: Actress
- Years active: 1982–present

Vilma Cibulková (born 26 March 1963) is a Czech film and stage actress. She won a Czech Lion for Best Supporting Actress at the 2003 Czech Lion Awards, for her role in the film Pupendo. At the 2006 Thalia Awards she won the category of Best Actress in a Play, before being awarded another prize in the same category at the 2014 Thalia Awards for her performance of the role of Leni Riefenstahl in a production of Leni at the Divadlo v Řeznické. She also won a prize at the 32nd Moscow International Film Festival, being named Best Actress for her role in An Earthly Paradise for the Eyes.

== Selected filmography ==
- Báječná léta pod psa (1997)
- Spring of Life (2000)
- Mazaný Filip (2003)
- Pupendo (2003)
- Dobrá čtvrť (television, 2005–2008)
- An Earthly Paradise for the Eyes (2009)
- Sign of the Horse (television, 2011–2015)
