= Cinta Pérez =

Spanish footballer (born 1985)

Personal information
- Full name: Cinta Pérez Cascales
- Date of birth: 17 February 1985 (age 41)
- Place of birth: Huelva, Spain
- Height: 1.70 m (5 ft 7 in)
- Position: Goalkeeper

Senior career*
Years	Team	Apps	(Gls)
2000–2005	Estudiantes Huelva		
2005–2011	Sporting Huelva		
- * Club domestic league appearances and goals

Cinta Pérez Cascales is a Spanish former footballer who played as a goalkeeper for Estudiantes Huelva and Sporting Huelva in Spain's Primera División.

== Career ==
Pérez played for Sporting Huelva since the foundation of the club and was part of the team involved in their promotion to the top tier, the Primera División. In October 2011, she retired from football to join the Spanish Air Force.
