= La Antilla =

Locality in Huelva, Spain

- Locality
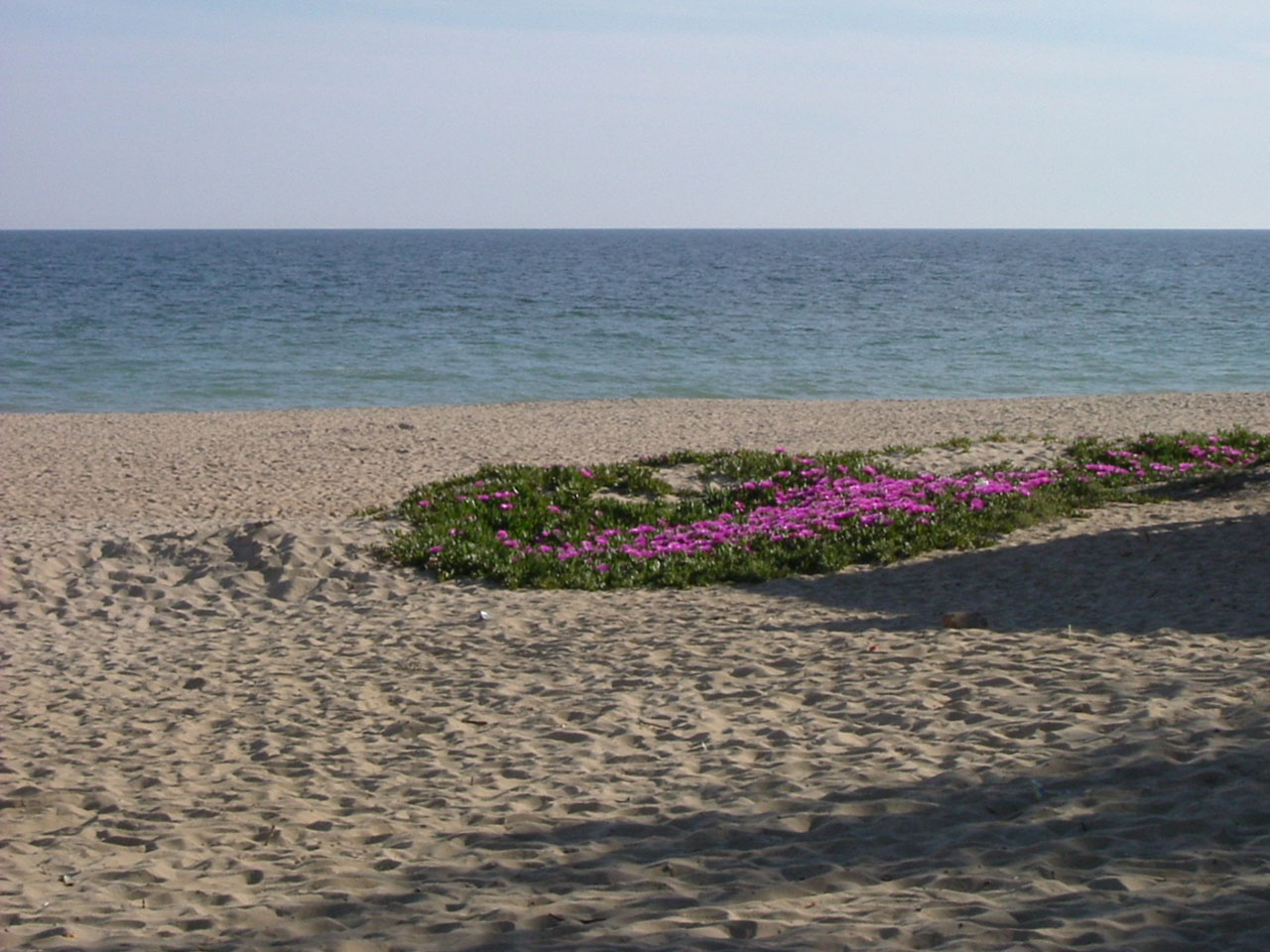
- Flowers on the sand of La Antilla beach

- Location within Province of Huelva Location within Andalusia Location within Spain
- Coordinates: 37°12′28″N 07°13′03″W
- Country: Spain
- Autonomous community: Andalusia
- Province: Huelva
- Comarca: Costa Occidental
- Municipality: Lepe

Government
  - Mayor: Juan Manuel González Camacho
- Elevation: 12 m (39 ft)

Population (2020)
  - Total: 1,606
- Time zone: UTC+1 (CET)
  - Summer (DST): UTC+2 (CEST)
- Postal code: 21449
- Telephone code: 959

La Antilla is a locality and a beach resort within Lepe, Huelva, Spain. It has a total population of 1,606 as of 2020. Its population usually increase drastically in the tourist season during the summer.

== Geography ==
La Antilla is located along the southern coast of Spain, near the border with Portugal. Its average elevation is 12 meters above the sea level.

== History ==
La Antilla beach was discovered near the estuary of Piedras River in the 16th century, at the same time when the Torre del Catalán was built.

At the end of the 19th century, local fishermen started building temporary residences in La Antilla. In 1946, there were about 50 such houses in the area.

In the 2010s, there have been different storms that have pushed back the coastline. The effect of the storms itself has been amplified by the instability of the coastline in the La Antilla area, as well as the presence of coastal works on nearby beaches such as the breakwaters of Villa Real and Isla Cristina.

== Climate ==
La Antilla has Hot-summer Mediterranean Climate. It sees the least amount of rainfall in July, with an average precipitation of 1.3 mm; and the most rainfall in December, with an average precipitation of 72.8 mm.

Climate data for La Antilla
| Month | Jan | Feb | Mar | Apr | May | Jun | Jul | Aug | Sep | Oct | Nov | Dec | Year |
|---|---|---|---|---|---|---|---|---|---|---|---|---|---|
| Mean daily maximum °C (°F) | 16 (61) | 17 (63) | 19 (66) | 21 (70) | 24 (75) | 27 (81) | 30 (86) | 30 (86) | 27 (81) | 23 (73) | 19 (66) | 16 (61) | 22 (72) |
| Daily mean °C (°F) | 11 (52) | 12 (54) | 15 (59) | 16 (61) | 19 (66) | 23 (73) | 25 (77) | 25 (77) | 23 (73) | 20 (68) | 15 (59) | 13 (55) | 18 (65) |
| Mean daily minimum °C (°F) | 8 (46) | 9 (48) | 11 (52) | 12 (54) | 15 (59) | 18 (64) | 20 (68) | 20 (68) | 19 (66) | 16 (61) | 12 (54) | 9 (48) | 14 (57) |
| Average rainfall mm (inches) | 48.8 (1.92) | 39.5 (1.56) | 33.1 (1.30) | 35.5 (1.40) | 20.4 (0.80) | 5.3 (0.21) | 1.3 (0.05) | 2.5 (0.10) | 15.1 (0.59) | 55.1 (2.17) | 71.3 (2.81) | 72.8 (2.87) | 400.7 (15.78) |
| Average rainy days (≥ 1 mm) | 5.9 | 4.9 | 4.5 | 4.7 | 3.0 | 0.9 | 0.2 | 0.4 | 2.2 | 5.9 | 6.4 | 7.2 | 46.2 |
| Mean daily daylight hours | 9.9 | 10.8 | 12.0 | 13.2 | 14.2 | 14.7 | 14.4 | 13.5 | 12.4 | 11.2 | 10.2 | 9.6 | 12.2 |
Source: Weatherspark.com
