= Nicolas Tenorio Cerero =

- Nicolas Tenorio Cerero
- Born: 28 December 1863; Villalba del Alcor, Province of Huelva, Spain
- Died: 1 December 1930 (aged 66); Seville, Spain
- Occupations: Writer, historian, judge
- Writing career
- Language: Spanish
- Notable work: The Galician Village La Aldea Gallega

Nicolas Tenorio Cerero (28 December 1863 – 1 December 1930) was a Spanish writer, historian, politician and judge.

== Early life ==
Nicolas was born in Villalba del Alcor, Spain. Orphaned at age 5, Cerero moved to Seville. He studied at the University of Seville between 1881 and 1886, where he pursued a legal career. After graduating he worked as a journalist for several years.

== Career ==
He later became a judge; his first assignment in 1897 was in Havana, Cuba (a Spanish colony). His term as a judge was interrupted by the Spanish–American War that led to Cuban independence.

Upon returning to Spain his assignment as a judge ended and he pursued a degree in history. His studies included research of important archives in Seville, including the General Archive of the Indies. His law practice and journalistic pursuits eventually led back to additional service as a judge. His work as a judge came in multiple regions of Spain, including Galicia, Murcia, Cádiz, Burgos and Seville.

He was a secretary-bookkeeper of the Cultural club of Seville from 1889 to 1893. He was elected to the Royal (Real) Sevillian Academy of Good Letters in 1900. He was an editor of a magazine, The Sevillian Newscaster (El Noticiero Sevillano), from its founding in 1893, and worked for other publications, such as The Future (El Porvenir).

In his second assignment as Judge, in October 1900 he moved from Seville to Viana do Bolo (Ourense, and Galicia). He later practiced in Vienna until 1906, when he moved to Vilamartín de Valdeorras (Ourense, Galicia). in 1910, he moved to Mule (Murcia), where he practiced in Cádiz. Later he moved to America as fiscal Lieutenant of the Hearing. In 1917 he finished his judicial career in Seville, as a civil justice. Parallel to his judicial career, he devoted himself to historical studies, writing books about the medieval epoch in Seville, and its juridical and political institutions. He died in Seville in 1930.

== Bibliography ==
He published books on sociology and anthropology. Named favorite son of Seville, his work was reissued especially The Galician Village La Aldea Gallega (La Aldea Gallega), due to the fact that it is the first anthropological study written on rural Galicia.

- Lists of crew members of the first trip of Christopher Colón to the Americas, appendix III and collaboration in work of Manuel Sales and I Covered The Discovery of America. Seville, 1893. Nicolas Tenorio.
- News of the parties in honour of the Marquise of Denia done by the city of Seville in 1599. Seville. 1896.
- The mausoleum of Colon, published in The Diary of The Future in Seville 1898.
- The Cave of the Serpent of the End, published in The Diary of The Future in Seville 1899 (the ethnographic study of former legend)
- The Galician Village La Aldea Gallega. (Study of common law and popular economy), written between 1900 and 1906, and published in Cádiz in 1914 for Manuel Álvarez's press.
- Some Menardo Ungut's news and It Throw Polono. Published in his Magazine of File, Libraries and Museums. Madrid 1901.
- The council of Seville (El Concejo de Sevilla). Study of the political – social organization of the city from its reconquest up to the reign of D. Alfonso XI (1248–1312). Edit: And. I itch. Seville 1901.
- A few elections in the Bun in 1614, published in Bulletin of the Provincial Commission of Historical and Artistic Monuments of Orense (juridical study on the form of election of the political annual charges in the Council of Viana do Skittle) (1903).
- The Galician Villages. Published in his Magazine of File, Libraries and Museums. Madrid 1903.
- Viana of the Skittle, settlers prerromanos, (recounted to Viana do Skittle), published in Bulletin of the Provincial Commission of Historical and Artistic Monuments of Orense Ourense (1904).
- Descripción and cosmografiade Spain, published between 1904 and 1914 for the magazine Bulletin of the Royal (Real) Society Geofráfica (transcription of Hernando Colón's manuscript on a trip that this it (he, she) did for Spain).
- The Militias of Seville, Magazine of Files, Libraries and Museums, XVII ( 1907 ).
- The Moriscos in Hornachos, Magazine I File Extremaduran, monthly magazine, science art and history, n º 5, Badajoz on 25 June 1908.
- Process brings over of the reference to the Royal Academy of the History, on the part of Nicolás Tenorio, manuscripts relative to Castro de Valdeorras's council. 1910.
- Visits that Don Enrique III made to Seville. (Seville 1924).
- Noticia Historical of the Royal Hearing of Seville (1924).
