= An Earthly Paradise for the Eyes =

2009 film by Irena Pavlásková

An Earthly Paradise For The Eyes
- DVD cover
- Directed by: Irena Pavlaskova
- Written by: Tereza Boučková
- Starring: Vilma Cibulková; Miroslav Etzler; Igor Bareš
- Production company: Cineart TV Prague
- Release date: 2009
- Running time: 119 minutes
- Country: Czech Republic

An Earthly Paradise For The Eyes is an English title for the Czech comedy film Zemský ráj to na pohled, directed by Irena Pavlásková and released in 2009. It portrays the adventures of a dissident family and their friends while under observation by pro-Soviet secret police in Prague between 1968 and 1977, during the country's period of "normalization"—forced revocation of the legislation and customs of the reform period led by Alexander Dubček (1963/1967 – 1968).

== Cast ==
- Vilma Cibulková as Marta
- Miroslav Etzler as Mirek
- Igor Bareš
- Jiří Dvořák as Petr Hána
- Jan Hartl as Director Kovác
- Tereza Voříšková as Gábina
- Jan Zadražil as Tomás
- Ondřej Vetchý as Jan Pavel
- Dana Marková as Majda
- Barbora Seidlová as Lenka

== Awards ==
(From Czech Wikipedia article)

- Tereza Boučková's screenplay received in 2006 the first-prize Sazka Award for best unproduced screenplay.
- Tereza Voříšková was nominated for the Czech Lion Award 2009 in the category "best actress in a supporting role".
- The film won the critics award FIPRESCI at the Moscow Film Festival.
- Vilma Cibulková won the Moscow International Film Festival Award for best actress, for her role in this film.
