= Villalba del Alcor =

Coordinates: 37°24′N 6°28′W

- Flag Coat of arms

- Location in Spain.
- Country: Spain
- Autonomous community: Andalusia
- Province: Huelva

Area
  - Total: 62.5 km^{2} (24.1 sq mi)
- Elevation: 153 m (502 ft)

Population (2025-01-01)
  - Total: 3,303
  - Density: 52.8/km^{2} (137/sq mi)
- Time zone: UTC+1 (CET)
  - Summer (DST): UTC+2 (CEST)
- Website: http://www.villalbadelalcor.es/es/

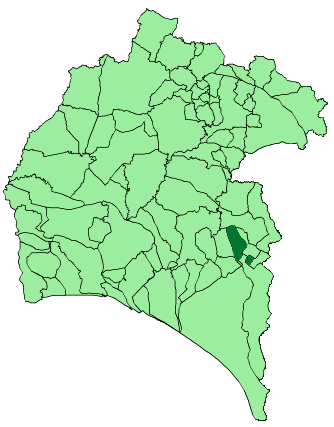
Map of Villalba del Alcor, Huelva

Villalba del Alcor is a town and municipality located in the province of Huelva, Spain. According to the 2008 census, the municipality had a population of 3527 inhabitants.

== See also ==
- List of municipalities in Huelva
