= Provincial Deputation of Huelva =

Government institution in Spain

- Diputación Provincial de Huelva
- Coat of arms

- Logo

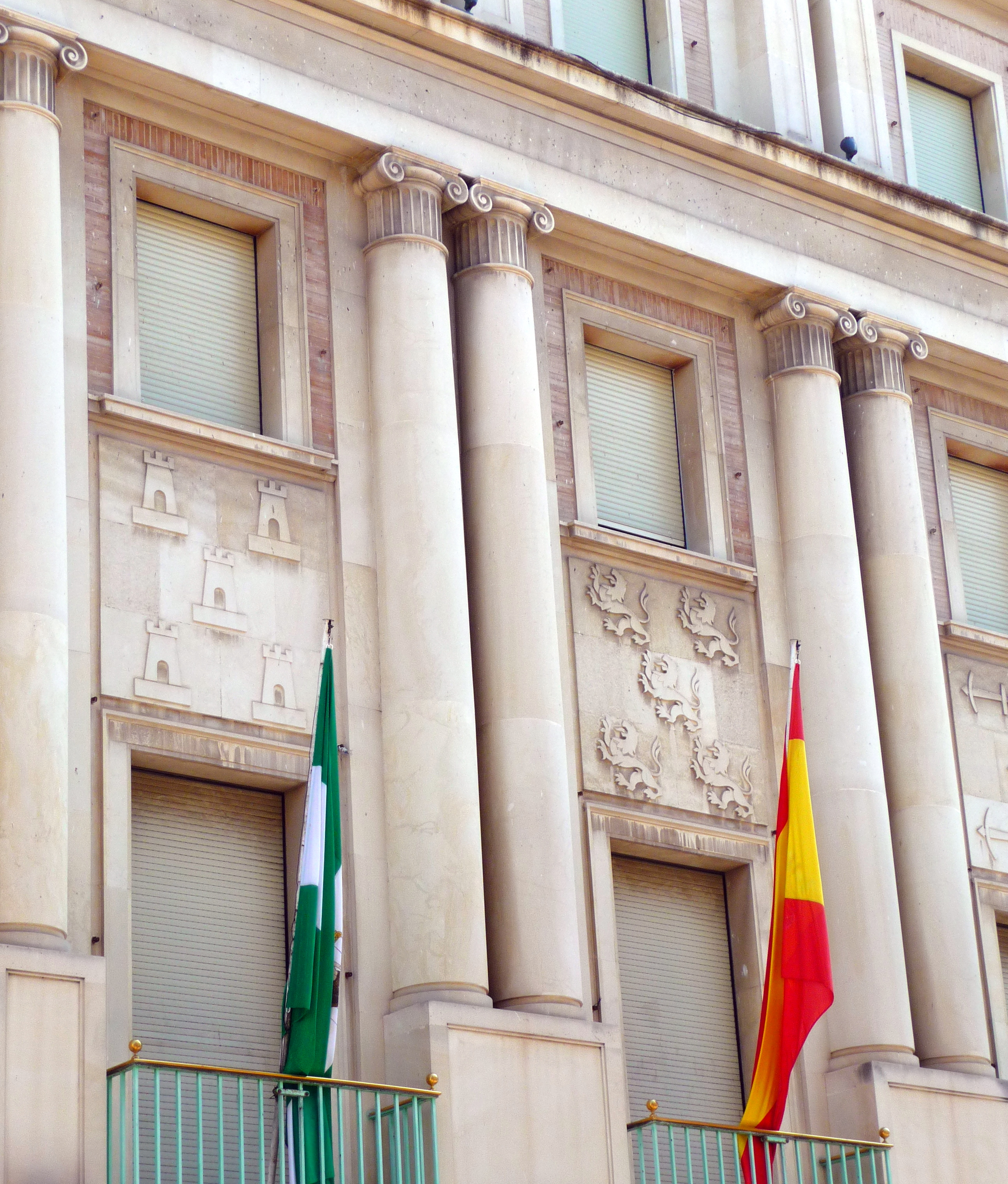

Provincial Deputation overview
- Formed: 16 November 1835
- Jurisdiction: Province of Huelva
- Headquarters: Palacio de la Diputación de Huelva. Huelva, Spain

The Provincial Deputation of Huelva (Spanish: Diputación Provincial de Huelva) is the institution charged with the government and administration of the Spanish province of Huelva.

== History ==
Even though there was a spell of trial of the provincial deputations across Spain during the 1820–1823 Trienio Liberal, the current organization in the province of Huelva was constituted on 16 November 1835. The provincial deputies originally represented the judicial districts of Huelva, Aracena, La Palma del Condado Ayamonte, Moguer and El Cerro del Andévalo, the latter of which was replaced in 1847 by that of Valverde del Camino.

== Composition ==
Composition of the Deputation after the 2023 Spanish local elections
Political party	Votes	%	Deputies
People's Party of Andalusia (PPA)	96,162	38.71%	14
Spanish Socialist Workers' Party of Andalusia (PSOE-A)	91,912	37.00%	11
Vox (VOX)	11,359	4.57%	1
United Left/The Greens–Assembly for Andalusia (IULV–CA)	10,856	4.37%	1
