= Huelva =

City in Andalusia, Spain

- Municipality
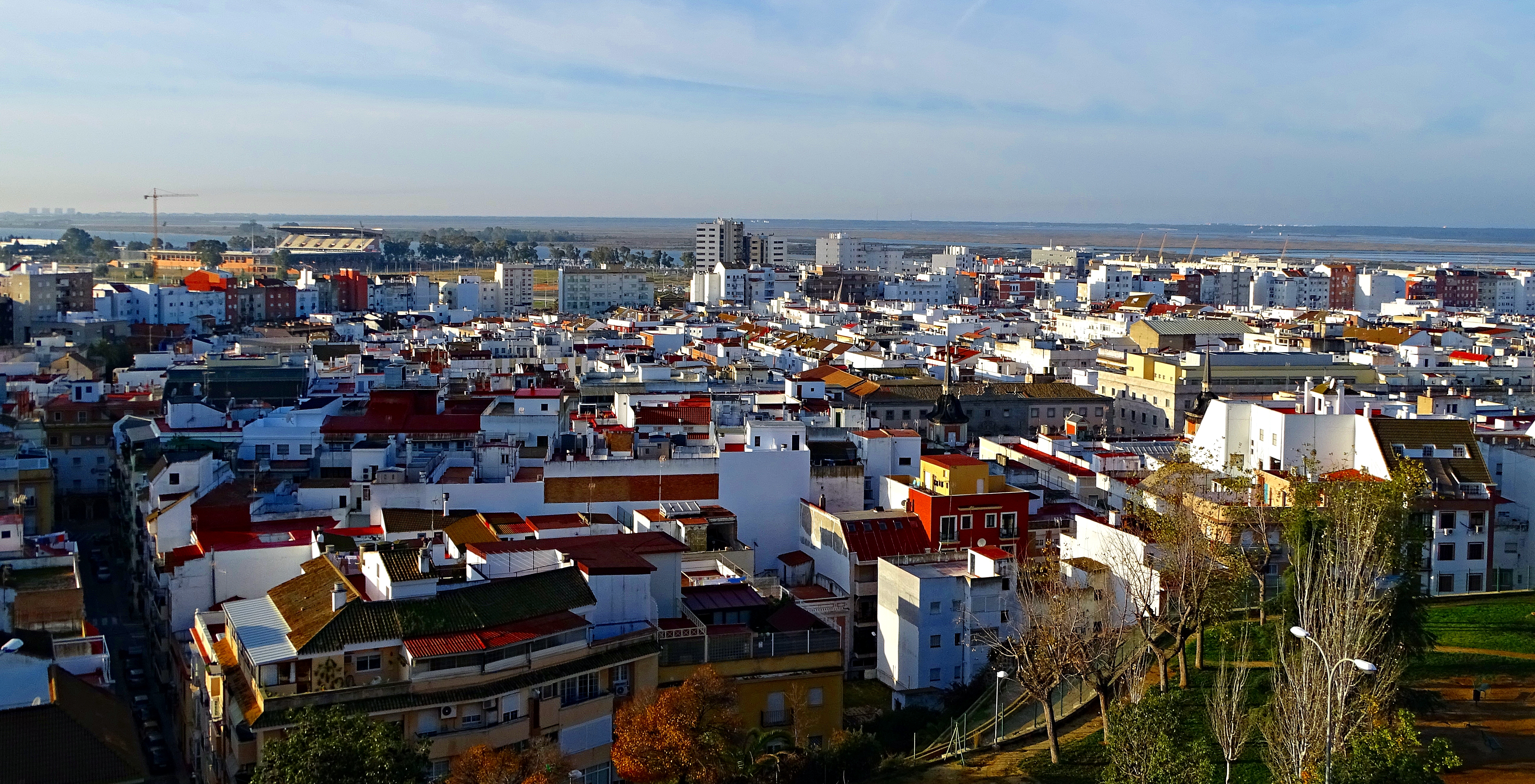
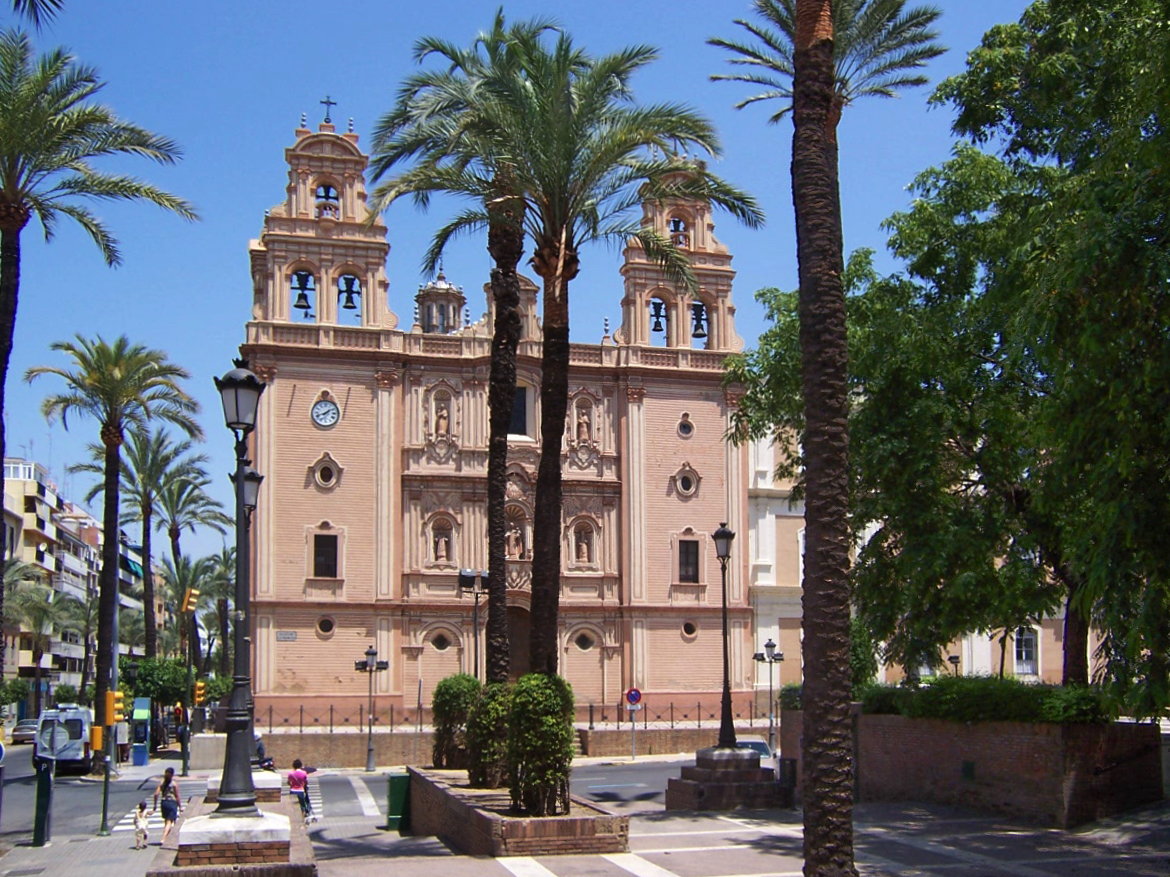
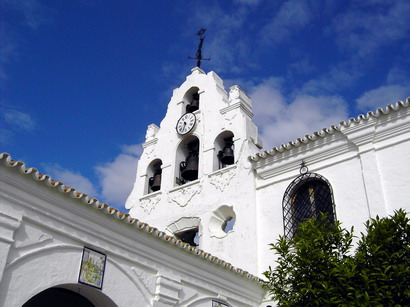
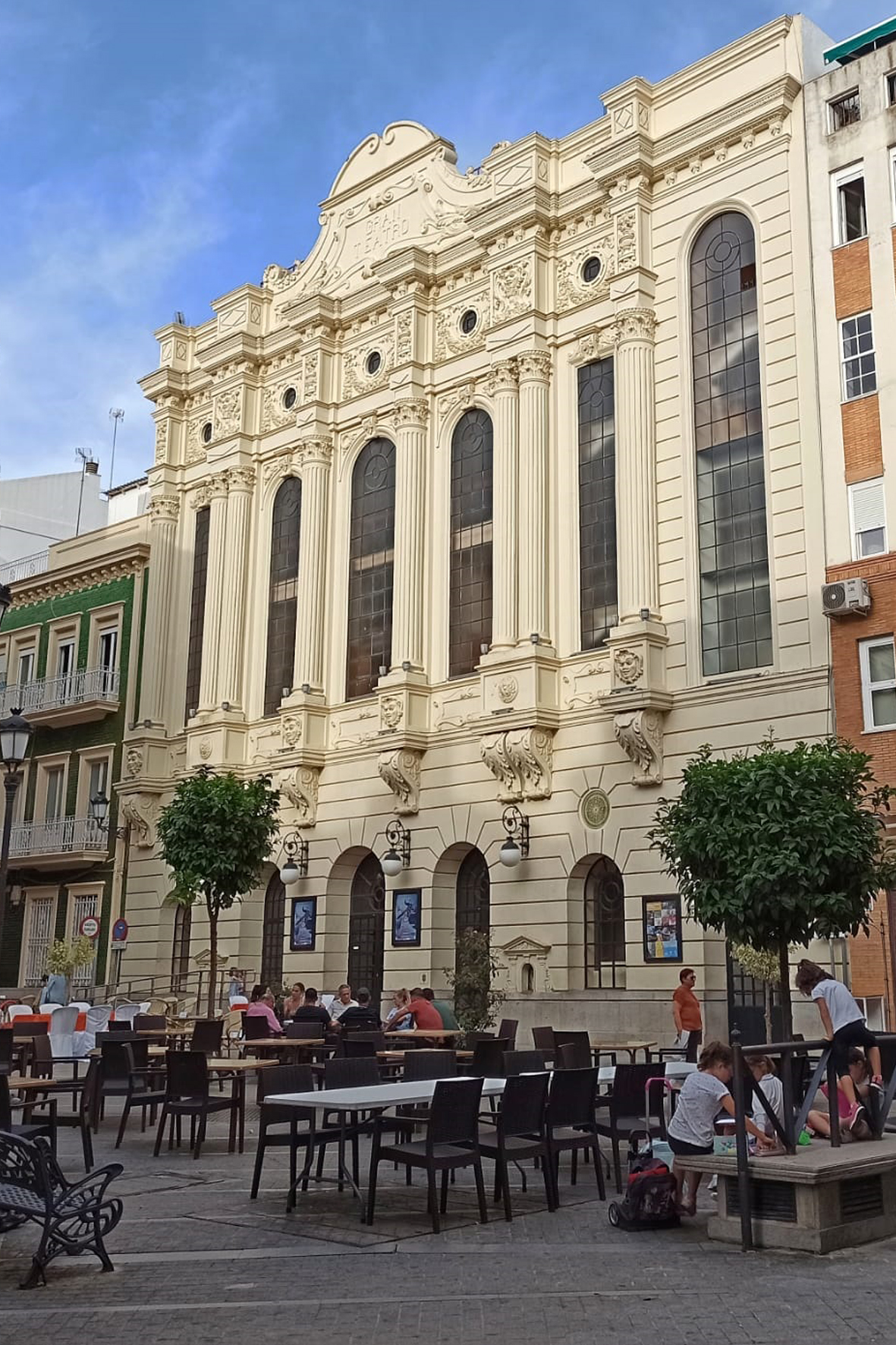
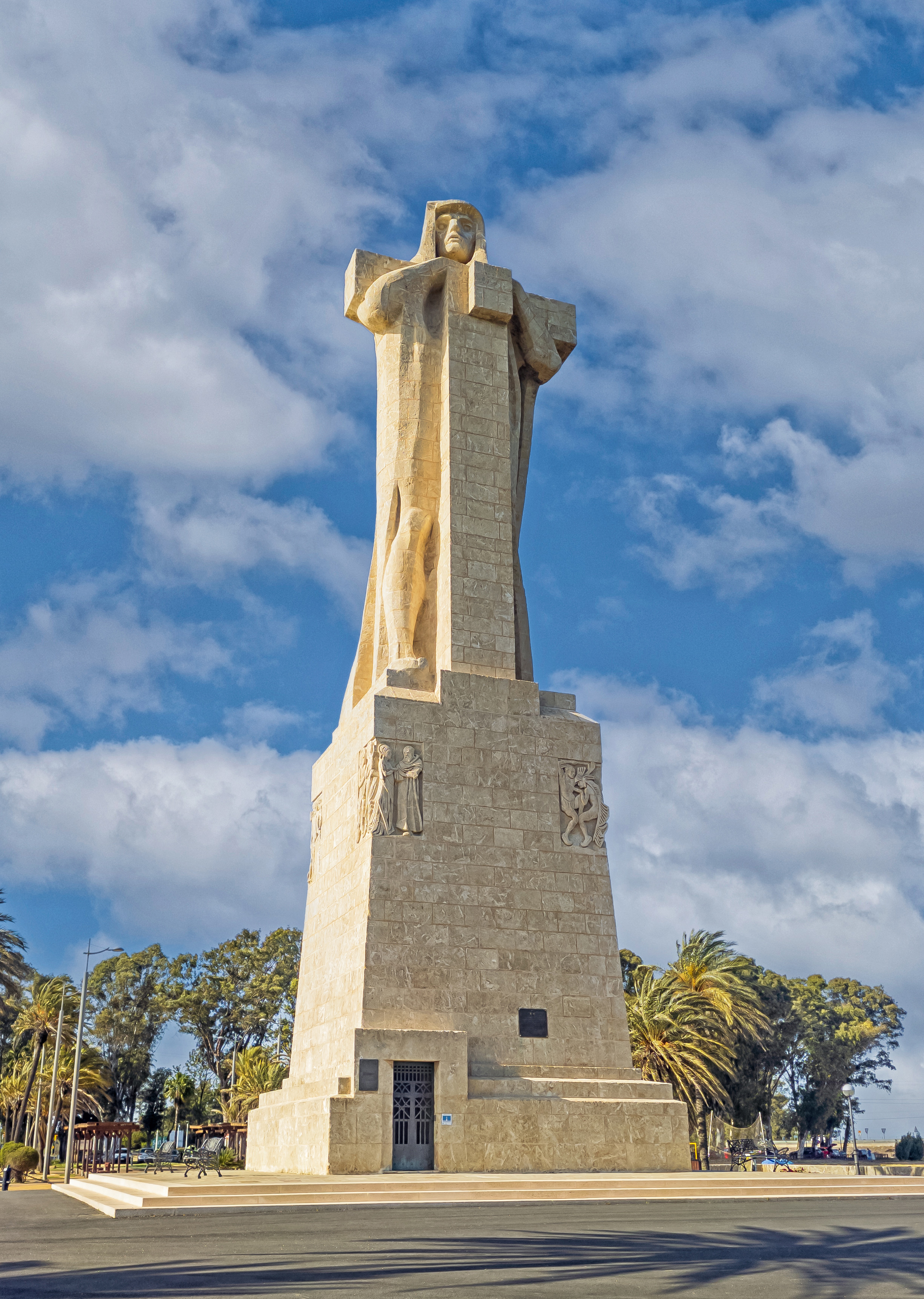
- Overview Huelva Cathedral Santuario de la Cinta Gran Teatro Monument to Columbus

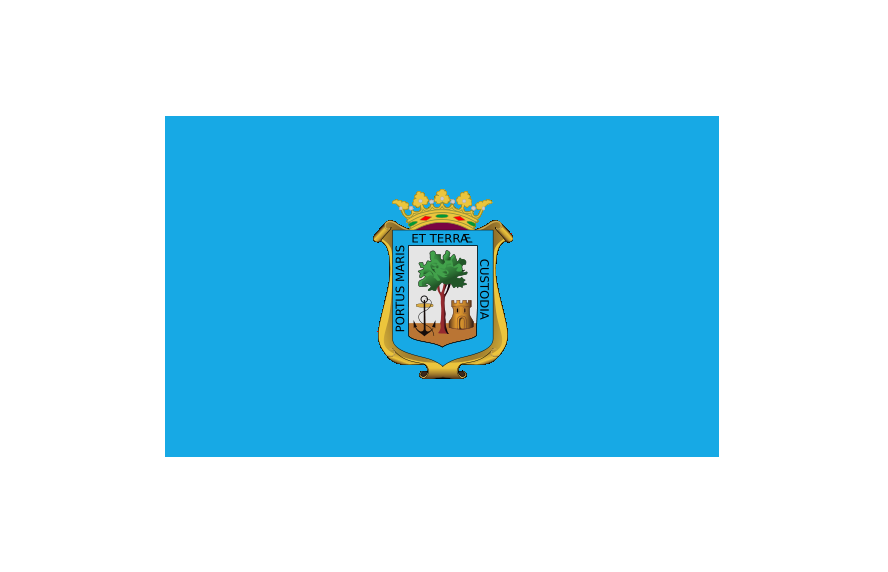
- Flag Coat of arms
- Motto: Portus Maris et Terrae Custodia
- Interactive map of Huelva
- Coordinates: 37°15′N 6°57′W
- Country: Spain
- Region: Andalusia
- Province: Huelva
- Founded: c. 10th–9th century BC

Government
  - Type: Ayuntamiento
  - Body: Ayuntamiento de Huelva
  - Mayor: Pilar Miranda Plata (PP)

Area
  - Total: 149 km^{2} (58 sq mi)
- Elevation: 54 m (177 ft)

Population (2025-01-01)
  - Total: 143,215
  - Density: 961/km^{2} (2,490/sq mi)
- Demonym(s): onubense, (colloquially) choquero/a
- Time zone: UTC+1 (CET)
  - Summer (DST): UTC+2 (CEST)
- Postal code: 21001 and others
- Website: Official website

Huelva (US: /ˈhwɛlvə/ WHEL-və, Spanish: [ˈwelβa], locally [ˈɡweɾβa]) is a municipality of Spain and the capital of the province of Huelva, in the autonomous community of Andalusia. Located in the southwest of the Iberian Peninsula, it sits between the estuaries of the Odiel and Tinto rivers on the Atlantic coast of the Gulf of Cádiz. According to the 2010 census, the city had a population of 149,410.

While the existence of an earlier pre-Phoenician settlement within the current urban limits since c. 1250 BC has been tentatively defended by scholars, Phoenicians established a stable colony roughly by the 9th century BC. Modern economic activity conformed to copper and pyrite extraction upstream funded by British capital and to the role of its port, as well as with the later development of a petrochemical industry.

Huelva is home to Recreativo de Huelva, the oldest football club in Spain.

== History ==
=== Protohistory ===
At least up to the 1980s and 1990s, the mainstream historians' view was that Huelva began as an autochthonous Tartessian settlement (possibly the very same Tartessos mentioned in Greek sources); later opinions have held that it was a multi-ethnic enclave, mixing natives with peoples with a mainly Phoenician, and later Greek, extraction. However, following the finding of Phoenician archaeological materials in the Méndez Núñez-Las Monjas site, the chronology as to the Phoenician presence was reassessed. The evidence favours solely viewing Huelva-Onoba as a very early Phoenician colony, a development which was parallel to a certain "dismantling" of the idea of Tartessos as a mainly autochthonous archaeological culture, even though the tentative identification of Huelva with Tartessos was not discarded, but rather kept. Tartessos has also been identified with the biblical Tarshish.

First contacts with the local Phoenician presence have been hypothesised to have taken place as early as 1015 to 975 BCE. However, remains such as those found in the Méndez Núñez-Las Monjas go so far as to show a likely Phoenician settlement of the 9th century BCE, especially to resemble a founding date of a Tyrian settlement from the reign of Ithobaal I between 875 and 850, although the Méndez Núñez-Las Monjas' archaeological finds have been brought forward as evidence of a 10th-century BCE founding chronology in the era of Hiram I (c. 975–950). The outpost was presumably populated mainly by continental Phoenicians, with some possible addition of the likes of Eteocypriots, Cypriot Phoenicians and Sardinian Phoenicians.

As a Phoenician outpost, it facilitated local exports such as silver, copper, purple dye and salted fish, while it also served as node in the trade routes connecting the Northern Atlantic, the Southern Atlantic and the Mediterranean. Population notably increased from the mid-8th century BCE onward, possibly connected to the arrival of refugees fleeing from Tiglath-Pileser III and, overall, from the economic crisis and social unrest induced by the Assyrian subjugation of the Levant.

It was called ʿunʿu baʿl ("Baal's fort") by the Phoenicians, which in most Greek texts corrupted to Ὄνοβα (Onoba). The Tartessian world entered a crisis in the 6th century BCE. The transition from the Tartessian period to the ensuing Turdetani period was presumably slow and not traumatic, degenerating from an economy based on mining to a new one focused on the trade of agricultural and fishing products. It was in the hands of the Turdetani at the time of conquest by Rome, and before the conquest, it issued silver coins with Iberian lettering.

=== Antiquity ===
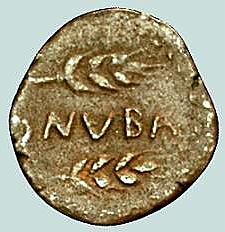
Roman coin with the onuba inscription

The place was called both Onoba Æstuaria or Onuba (used on coinage) during Roman times, or, simply, Onoba. It was put in the Roman province of Hispania Bætica. According to the Antonine Itinerary: it was a maritime town between the Anas, (modern Guadiana) and Bætis (modern Guadalquivir); it was on the estuary of the Luxia (modern Odiel), and on the road from the mouth of the Anas to Augusta Emerita (modern Mérida). There are still some Roman remains. Huelva hosted a mint; and many coins have been found there bearing the name of the town as Onuba.

=== Middle Ages ===
Soon after the beginning of the Umayyad invasion of the Iberian Peninsula in 711, Onuba was seized by the troops of Musa ibn Nusayr by April 712. Within a few decades, to both the broader Islamic world and the conquered locals, the town's name had corrupted to ولبة (Walba).

During the fitna of al-Andalus a weak and ephemeral taifa emerged following the demise of local Umayyad control: the bakrid, from 1012 to 1051. In the latter year, it was annexed by the more powerful Taifa of Seville, to be later occupied by the Almoravids in 1091. By 1262, Huelva—then part of the Taifa of Niebla—was taken by Alfonso X of Castile. From 1265 onward, Huelva enjoyed an exemption from the portazgo tribute, a portage tax.

Following the Christian conquest, the town became a royal demesne for a short time, until it was ceded in Lordship to Admiral Juan Mathé de la Luna in 1293 by Sancho IV of Castile. After a period during which Huelva was probably controlled by Seville, the tenencia of the lordship was passed to several lords, including Alonso Meléndez de Guzmán—brother of Eleanor de Guzmán—(in 1338) and Juan Alfonso de la Cerda (c. 1344). Huelva, again a realengo for a short time during the reign of Peter I, saw its privileges confirmed and was granted the right to choose the alcalde and the alguacil in 1351. The lordship was soon given to the king's mistress, María de Padilla.

=== Early modern history ===
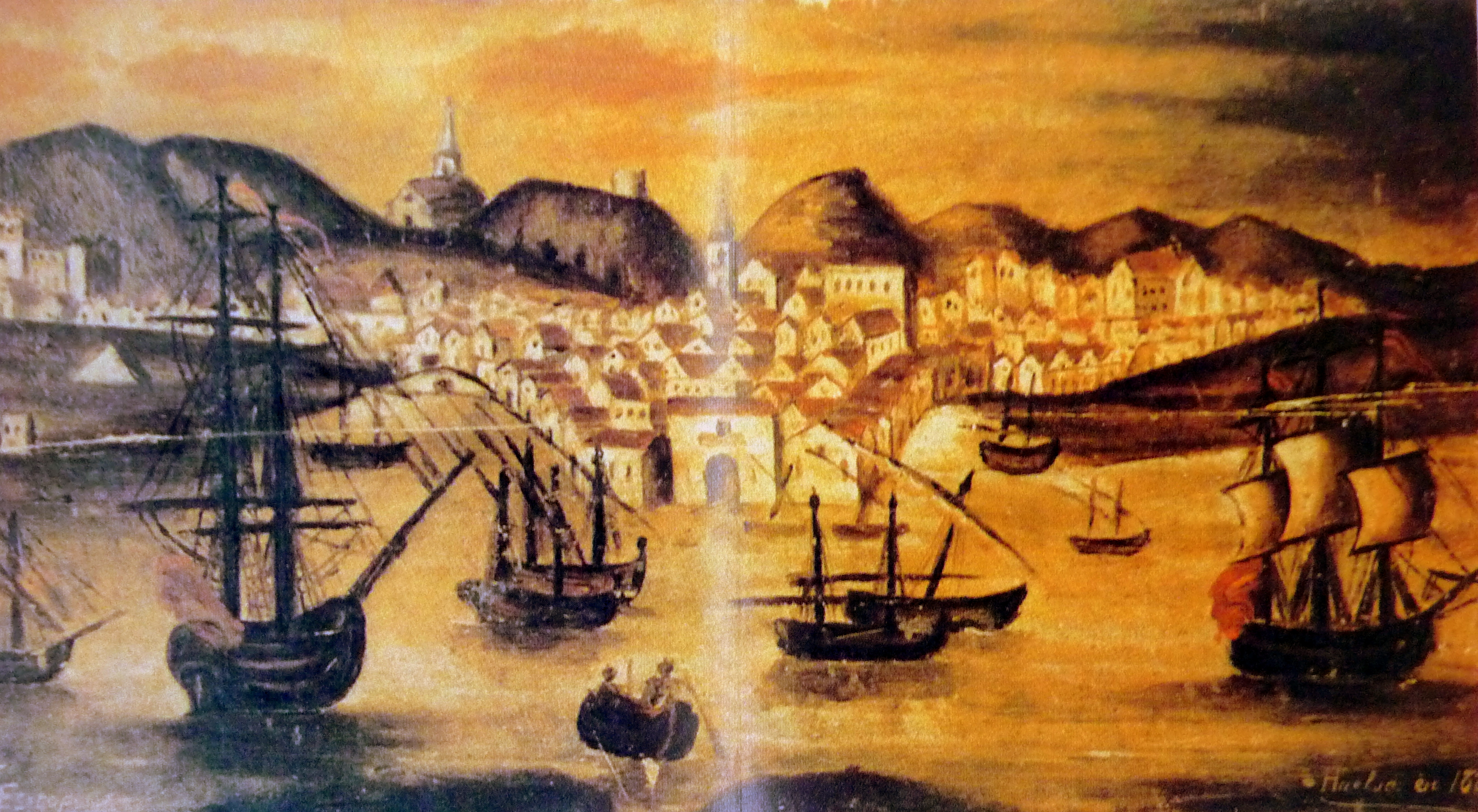
18th-century depiction of the port and city

It suffered substantial damage in the 1755 Lisbon earthquake.

Huelva became a leading fishing town in Andalusia in the 16th century (thriving in the sardine and tuna markets). The town became a provincial capital in 1833.

=== Modern history ===
Mines in the countryside still send copper and pyrite to Huelva's port for export. From about 1873, the major mining company has been Rio Tinto.

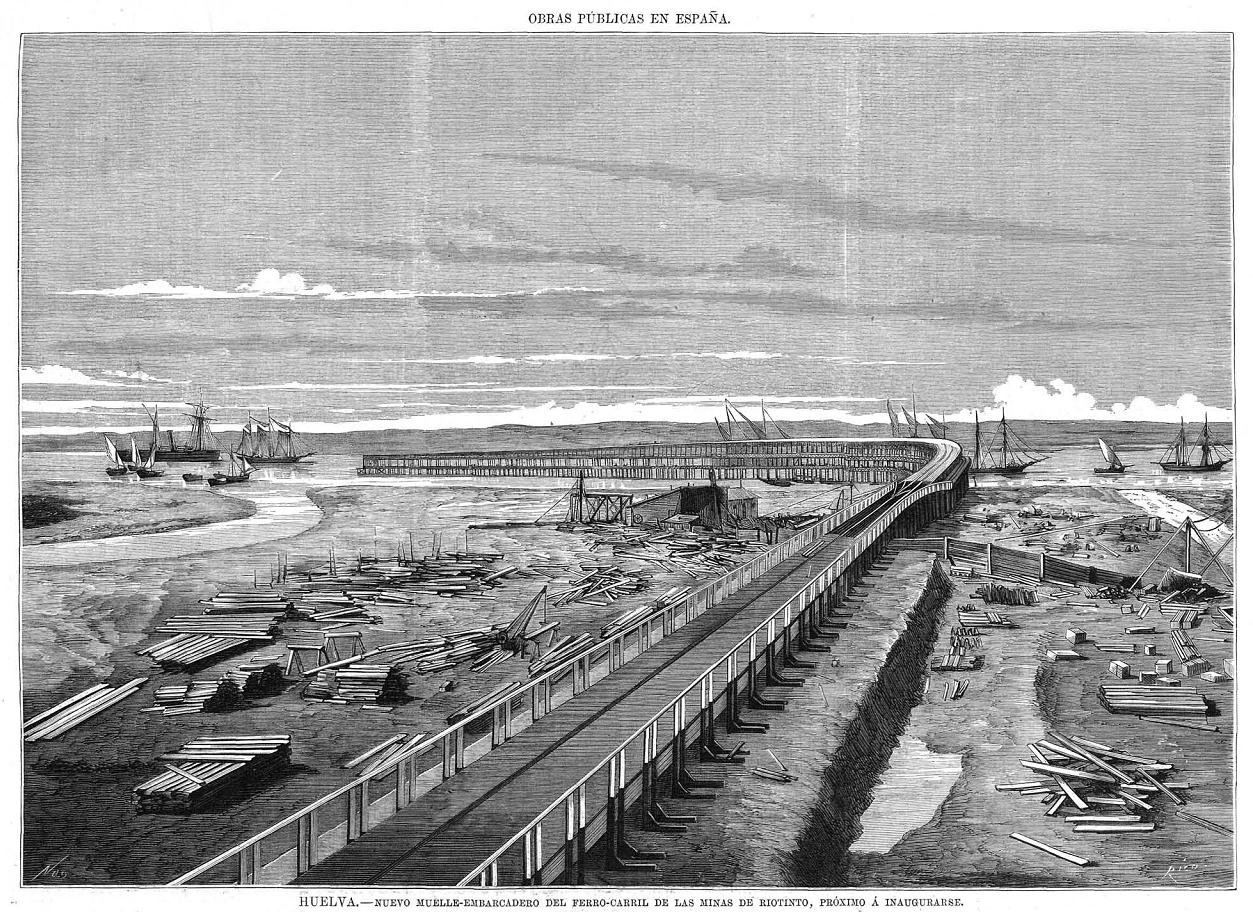
New pier-jetty of the Minas de Riotinto railway station, about to be opened in 1876

Huelva acquired the status of city (ciudad) by means of a royal decree on 17 September 1876.

The ore-smelting caused severe sulfur dioxide pollution and was frequently met by the protests of local farmers, peasants and miners, allied under the anarchist Syndicalist leader Maximiliano Tornet. On 4 February 1888, the Pavi Regiment of the Spanish Army opened fire on demonstrators at the village plaza of Rio Tinto. Historians estimate the number of deaths at 100 to 200. One hundred years later, environmentalists defending the nearby village of Nerva referred to 1888 as the "year of shots", in their protests against the provincial government's plans to site a large waste dump in a disused mine in the 1990s.

The local football club, Recreativo de Huelva was founded in 1889 by workers of Rio Tinto Group. Nicknamed the Decano of Spanish football, it is the longest-playing football club in Spain.

The 17–18 July 1936 military coup d'état that started the Spanish Civil War failed in the city and much of the province. However, on 27 July, 500 guardias civiles rose in arms against the Republic in the city, with the authorities escaping and later being shot down. Two days later, on 29 July, a rebel column from Seville on behalf of Gonzalo Queipo de Llano took control of the city. For the rest of the conflict, it remained to the rear of the zone controlled by the Rebel faction. The ensuing Francoist repression took a heavy toll, with an estimated total of 6,019 deaths all over the province for the rearguard and post-war repression.

During World War II, the city was a hub of espionage activities led by members of the large British and German expatriate communities. German activity centered on reporting British shipping moving in and out of the Atlantic. Most famously, the outskirts of Huelva was where Operation Mincemeat sent a cadaver carrying forged identification and fake documents to wash ashore. (Note: The cadaver, "Major William Martin, Royal Marines" of Operation Mincemeat is buried in the San Marco section of the cemetery of Nuestra Senora under a headstone that reads: William Martin, born 29 March 1907, died 24 April 1943, beloved son of John Glyndwyr and the late Antonia Martin of Cardiff, Wales, DULCE ET DECORUM EST PRO PATRIA MORI, R.I.P.)

Twenty-five years after the city was declared a Polo de Desarrollo Industrial ("Pole of Industrial Development") in 1964, the population had nearly doubled.

== Geography ==
=== Location ===
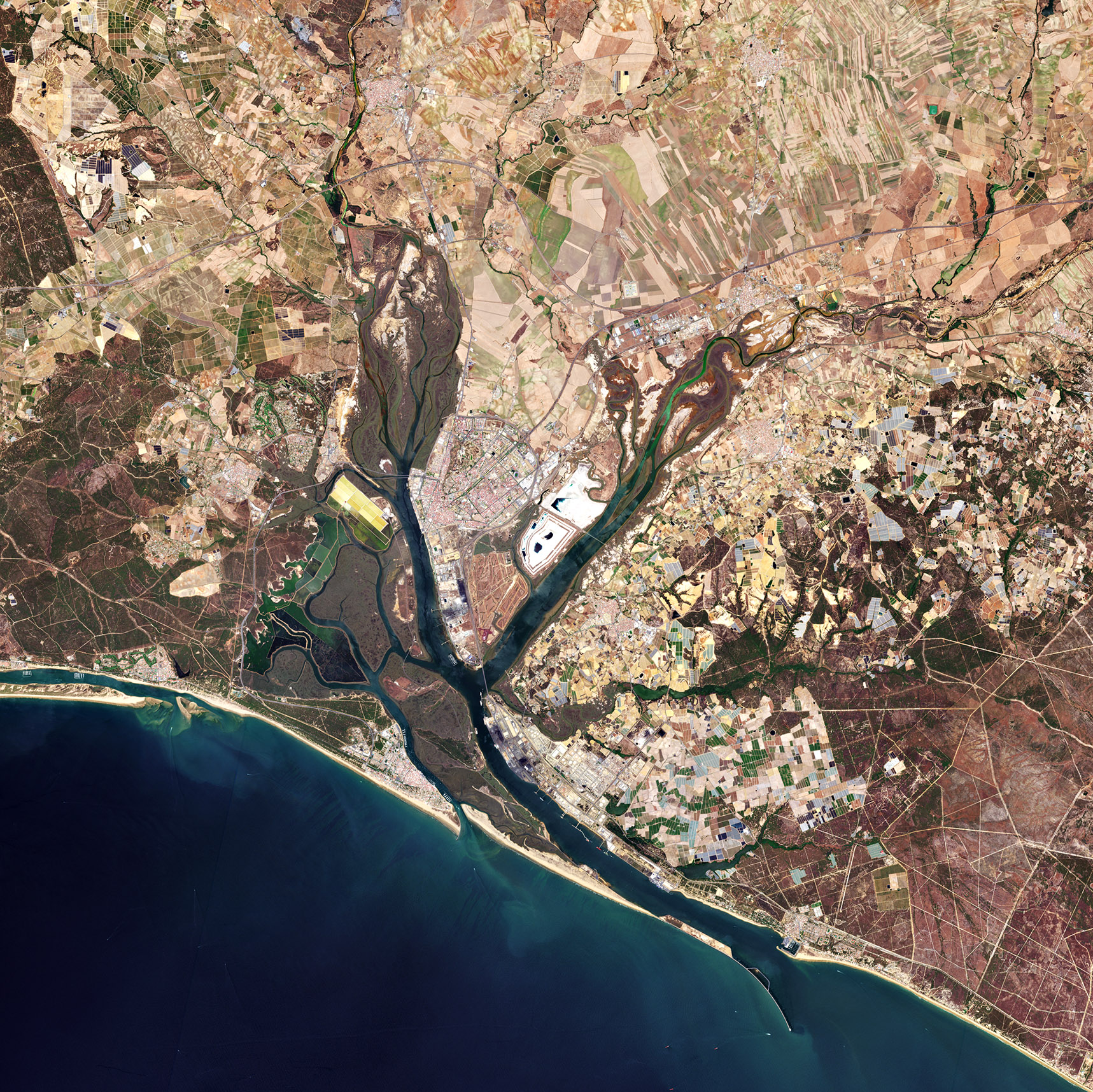

Huelva is in the Southwest of the Iberian Peninsula, in the Gulf of Cádiz, facing the Atlantic Ocean. The coastline straddling along the Gulf of Cádiz is known as Costa de la Luz. The city lies next to the estuary formed by the confluence of the Odiel and Tinto, sandwiched in between both rivers.

A rather wide estuary in ancient times, the estuary of Huelva progressively silted up to a large extent.

=== Climate ===
Huelva and its metropolitan area experience a Mediterranean climate (Köppen: Csa), characterized by mild, wet winters and long, hot, dry summers. The average annual temperature is approximately 18.1 °C (64.6 °F), with average highs reaching 25.5 °C (77.9 °F) in August and lows of 11.4 °C (52.5 °F) in January. Annual precipitation is around 525 mm (20.7 in) per year, typically spread across 53 rainy days, with December being the wettest month. Extreme temperatures have included a high of 43.9 °C (111.0 °F) recorded on 25 July 2022 and a low of -3.2 °C (29 °F) recorded in January. While Huelva experiences milder conditions near the coastline, its location near the river delta slightly amplifies summer warmth.

Snowfall is an extremely rare phenomenon in the city of Huelva. The most significant snowfalls recorded occurred in February 1954 and January 1991, with snow depths reaching up to 10 cm (4 in) and 15 cm (6 in), respectively, causing notable disruptions due to the region's lack of preparedness for such events. Huelva's climate is further influenced by being on the Atlantic Ocean, which moderates temperatures, particularly in coastal areas.

The Sierra de Huelva's unique microclimate also contributes to its occasional snowfalls yearly, making it a distinct feature compared to the otherwise temperate lowlands.

Climate data for Huelva, Ronda Este 1991–2020
Month	Jan	Feb	Mar	Apr	May	Jun	Jul	Aug	Sep	Oct	Nov	Dec	Year
Record high °C (°F)	24.6 (76.3)	27.6 (81.7)	31.0 (87.8)	33.0 (91.4)	39.1 (102.4)	41.1 (106.0)	43.9 (111.0)	43.4 (110.1)	42.0 (107.6)	35.6 (96.1)	28.4 (83.1)	24.6 (76.3)	43.9 (111.0)
Mean daily maximum °C (°F)	16.3 (61.3)	17.5 (63.5)	20.4 (68.7)	22.1 (71.8)	25.5 (77.9)	29.5 (85.1)	33.0 (91.4)	33.1 (91.6)	29.8 (85.6)	25.3 (77.5)	19.9 (67.8)	16.9 (62.4)	24.1 (75.4)
Daily mean °C (°F)	11.2 (52.2)	12.0 (53.6)	14.5 (58.1)	16.3 (61.3)	19.4 (66.9)	23.2 (73.8)	26.1 (79.0)	26.3 (79.3)	23.6 (74.5)	19.7 (67.5)	14.8 (58.6)	12.0 (53.6)	18.2 (64.8)
Mean daily minimum °C (°F)	5.9 (42.6)	6.5 (43.7)	8.6 (47.5)	10.4 (50.7)	13.2 (55.8)	16.9 (62.4)	19.1 (66.4)	19.5 (67.1)	17.3 (63.1)	14.1 (57.4)	9.7 (49.5)	7.1 (44.8)	12.4 (54.3)
Record low °C (°F)	−3.2 (26.2)	−2.2 (28.0)	−1.2 (29.8)	1.6 (34.9)	4.8 (40.6)	8.4 (47.1)	12.4 (54.3)	12.4 (54.3)	9.4 (48.9)	4.2 (39.6)	0.2 (32.4)	−2.2 (28.0)	−3.2 (26.2)
Average precipitation mm (inches)	63.2 (2.49)	43.1 (1.70)	41.5 (1.63)	42.6 (1.68)	26.8 (1.06)	6.1 (0.24)	1.1 (0.04)	2.1 (0.08)	22.4 (0.88)	68.3 (2.69)	87.1 (3.43)	88.0 (3.46)	492.3 (19.38)
Average precipitation days (≥ 1mm)	6.9	5.5	5.0	5.9	4.0	0.9	0.2	0.4	2.4	5.9	7.0	7.5	51.6
Average relative humidity (%)	77	73	68	65	62	57	54	56	61	69	75	78	66.2
Mean monthly sunshine hours	165	171	229	255	296	341	367	340	268	211	176	151	2,970

== Transportation ==
Huelva is home to Grupo Damas, a major provincial bus company providing connections between Huelva and other cities in Spain.

The city has a modern train station, inaugurated in 2018, which connects Huelva to Seville via regular trains and to Madrid through daily high-speed AVE train services. Currently, there are no direct train services between Huelva and Portugal.

The Port of Huelva offers passenger ferry services operated by Naviera Armas. The ferry Volcán del Teide provides weekly connections to Arrecife (Lanzarote) and Las Palmas de Gran Canaria in the Canary Islands.

Huelva does not have its own airport yet. The nearest airports are Faro Airport (Portugal), approximately 93 km away, and Seville Airport, about 95 km away. Both airports offer a range of domestic and international flights.

== Demographics ==
Huelva had a population of 149,410 in 2010. The city experienced a population boom in the nineteenth century, due to the exploitation of mineral resources in the area, and another with the construction of the Polo de Desarrollo (industrial hub) in the 1960s. It had a population of 5,377 inhabitants in 1787, which had risen to only 8,519 by 1857. From 1887, the city experienced rapid growth, reaching 21,539 residents in 1900, 56,427 in 1940, and 96,689 in 1970. Rapid expansion occurred in the following decades, and the population reached 141,479 by 1991.

From 1997 to 2007, immigration both from abroad and from the surrounding area sustained population growth. In 2007, the city reached a population of 145,000, while the metropolitan area had nearly 232,000 inhabitants, encompassing the surrounding areas of Aljaraque, Moguer, San Juan del Puerto, Punta Umbría, Gibraleón, and Palos de la Frontera. The 2006 census recorded a foreign-born population of almost 5,000 people in the urban centre, the majority of whom were of Moroccan origin.

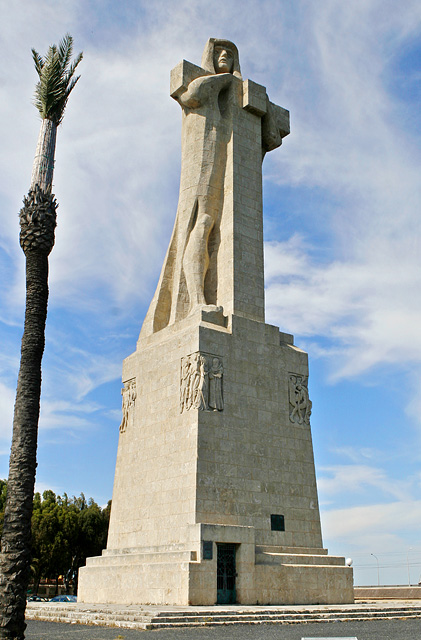
Monument to the Discovery Faith, a 37-metre-tall sculpture by Gertrude Vanderbilt Whitney celebrating the Columbian exploration of the Americas

== Artists ==
The most well-known artists in Huelva have been the poet and winner of the Nobel Prize in Literature Juan Ramón Jiménez, the sculptor Antonio León Ortega, the writer Nicolas Tenorio Cerero and the painter Daniel Vázquez Díaz.
Other outstanding artists from Huelva include the painters José Caballero, Pedro Gómez y Gómez, Antonio Brunt, Mateo Orduña Castellano, Pablo Martínez Coto, Manuel Moreno Díaz, Juan Manuel Seisdedos Romero, Francisco Doménech, Esperanza Abot, José María Labrador, Sebastián García Vázquez, Pilar Barroso, Juan Carlos Castro Crespo, Lola Martín, Antonio Gómez Feu, Rafael Aguilera, and Florencio Aguilera Correa. Miguel Báez Espuny, called el Litri, was a very famous bullfighter from Huelva; his son, named Miguel Báez Spínola, was also a very renowned bullfighter who retired in 1999.

== Sports ==
The city is home to Recreativo de Huelva, the oldest football club in Spain.

== Events ==
- Cabalgata de los Reyes Magos: Held on January 5, this traditional parade features the Three Wise Men distributing sweets and gifts to children, marking the culmination of the Christmas season.
- Carnaval: Celebrated in February, the carnival includes vibrant parades, music, and dance, with participants donning elaborate costumes, reflecting the city's festive spirit.
- Semana Santa (Holy Week): During March or April, Huelva's streets come alive with solemn processions, religious imagery, and traditional music, commemorating the Passion of Christ.
- Romería del Rocío: In late May or early June, pilgrims from Huelva join thousands from across Spain to journey to the village of El Rocío in one of the country's most significant religious pilgrimages.
- Colombinas Festivities (Fiestas Colombinas): Held in late July and early August, these festivities honor Christopher Columbus's departure from Huelva's port the 3rd of August of 1492, featuring concerts, fairs, and cultural events.
- Fiestas de la Cinta: Held between 3–8 September, commemorate Virgin Cinta with concerts and a festival.
- Ibero-American Film Festival Festival de Cine Iberoamericano de Huelva:In November, this festival showcases films from Latin American countries, Spain, and Portugal, promoting cultural exchange and cinematic excellence.
- San Sebastián, festival 20 January
- Fiesta de la Gamba, Jamón y del Vino (Prawn, Ham, and Wine Festival): A gastronomic highlight of the year, this festival in spring celebrates local delicacies, including fresh prawns, Iberian ham, and regional wines, drawing food lovers from across Andalusia.
- Fiesta de la Tapa: Typically held during the year, this event offers visitors and locals the chance to sample a wide variety of tapas from local restaurants, showcasing the region's culinary diversity.

== Nearby ==
Near Huelva, in the Huelva River estuary, lies Herculis Insula, mentioned by Strabo (iii. p. 170), called Ἡράκλεια by Stephanus of Byzantium (s. v.), now Isla Saltés.

The Doñana National Park is in the south-east of Huelva territory.

== Notable people ==
- Al-Bakri (1040-1094), historian and geographer
- Francisco Manuel de las Heras y Borrero (1951–2013), Spanish historian
- Cinta Pérez (born 1985), former footballer
- Carolina Marín (born 1993), professional badminton player
- Yosef ben HaLevi HaIvri (born in the 15th century), a Jew who accompanied Christopher Columbus as an interpreter on his first voyage.

== Twin towns – sister cities ==
Huelva is twinned with:

- Córdoba, Spain
- Genoa, Italy
- Viganella, Italy
- Győr, Hungary
- Faro, Portugal
- Huế, Vietnam
- New Orleans, United States
- Houston, United States
- Cádiz, Spain
- Marín, Spain
- Piteşti, Romania
- Tangier, Morocco
- Santa María del Río, Mexico (2010)
- Lugo, Spain
- Safi, Morocco
- Adamuz, Spain

== See also ==
- Costa de la Luz
- Tourist Mining Train
- Tharsis railway line
- Riotinto Railway
- Rio Tinto Company Limited
- List of municipalities in Huelva
