= Marcel Rasquin =

Venezuelan film director

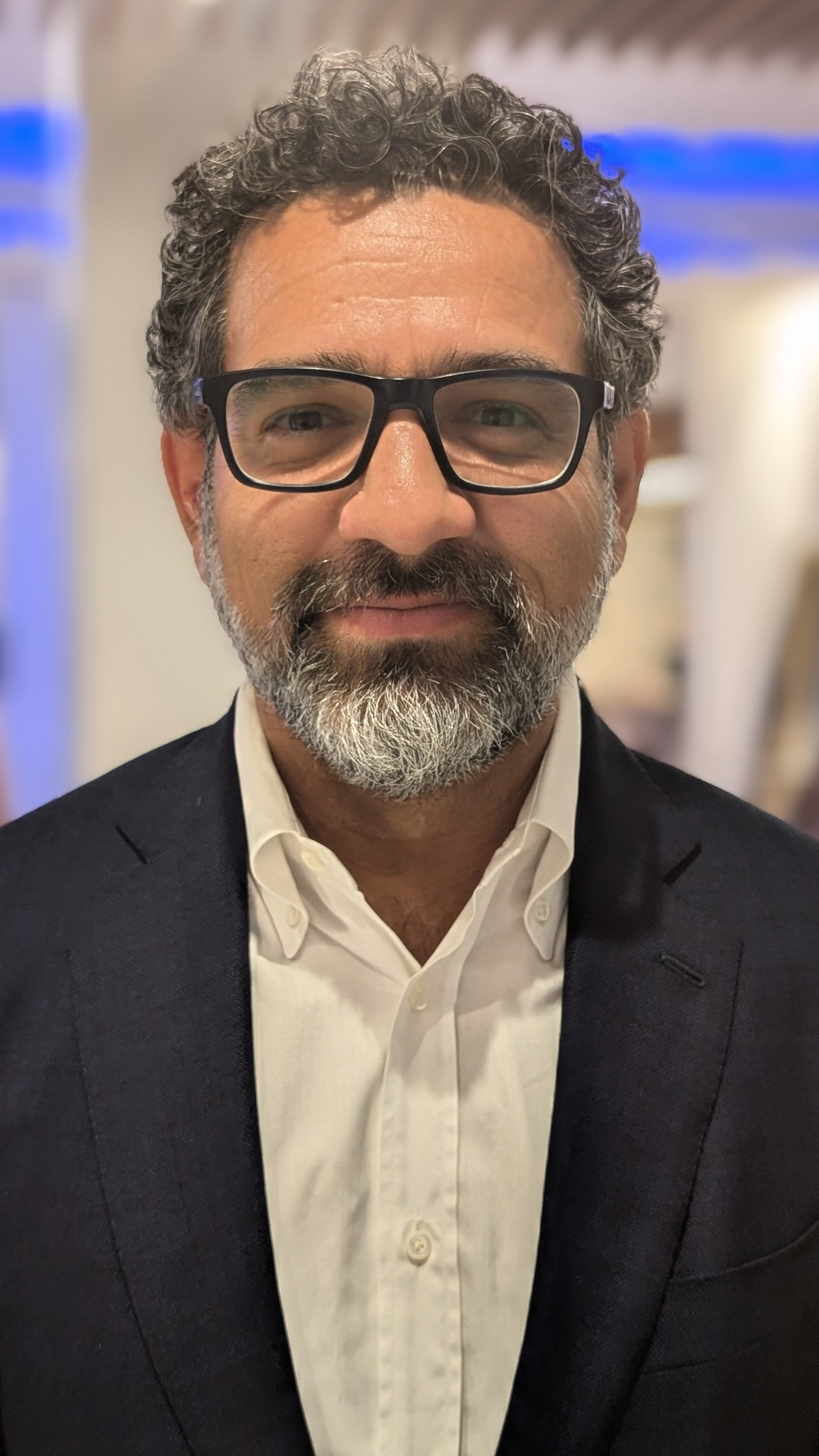
- Born: September 9, 1976 (age 49); Caracas, Venezuela

Marcel Rasquin (born September 9, 1976) is a Venezuelan film director. He directed the 2010 film Hermano. The film won the Golden George at the Moscow International Film Festival and was selected as the Venezuelan entry for the Best Foreign Language Film at the 83rd Academy Awards, but didn't make the final shortlist. Rasquin is in a relationship with actress Prakriti Maduro
