= George Brown =

George Brown may refer to:

== Arts and entertainment ==
- George Loring Brown (1814–1889), American landscape painter
- George Douglas Brown (1869–1902), Scottish novelist
- George Williams Brown (1894–1963), Canadian historian and editor
- George D. Brown (architect) (1898–1968), American architect
- George H. Brown (producer) (1913–2001), British film producer
- George Mackay Brown (1921–1996), Scottish poet, author, and dramatist
- George Brown (medievalist) (died 2021), American scholar of Anglo-Saxon literature
- George Brown (musician) (1949–2023), American drummer for Kool & the Gang

== Business and industry ==
- George Edwards Brown (1780–1848), British-born Chilean businessman and politician
- George Brown (financier) (1787–1859), American banker and railroad founder
- George W. Brown (businessman) (1845–1918), American founder of the Brown's Business College chain
- George A. Brown (1885–1940), Scottish businessman, manager of the Rangoon Times
- George R. Brown (1898–1983), American construction entrepreneur
- George Garvin Brown IV (born 1969/70), Canadian businessman

== Law ==
- George F. Brown (c. 1820–1893), justice of the Supreme Court of Mississippi
- George H. Brown (North Carolina judge) (1850–1926), associate justice of the North Carolina Supreme Court
- George M. Brown (judge) (1864–1934), American attorney and judge in Oregon
- George Stewart Brown (1871–1941), judge for the United States Customs Court
- George H. Brown Jr. (born 1939), associate justice of the Tennessee Supreme Court
- Sir George Brown (Belizean judge) (1942–2007), chief justice of Belize from 1990 to 1998

== Military ==
- Sir George Brown (British Army officer) (1790–1865), British general in the Crimean War
- George Brown (admiral) (1835–1913), American admiral
- George Scratchley Brown (1918–1978), chief of staff of the U.S. Air Force, chairman of the Joint Chiefs of Staff

== Politics and government ==
=== Canada ===
- George Brown (Canadian politician) (1818–1880), Scottish-born journalist and politician
- George Stayley Brown (1827–1915), ship owner, historian and political figure in Nova Scotia
- George W. Brown (Saskatchewan politician) (1860–1919), Lieutenant Governor of Saskatchewan
- George Brown (Ottawa politician) (born 1959), Ottawa politician

=== United Kingdom ===
- George Brown (Governor of Bombay) (1775–1819), governor of Bombay
- George Francis Brown (1802–1871), civil servant of the East India Company
- George Mackenzie Brown (1869–1946), member of parliament
- George Brown, Baron George-Brown (1914–1985), Secretary of State for Foreign Affairs

=== United States ===
- George Brown (Rhode Island politician) (1746–1836), lieutenant governor of Rhode Island
- George Houston Brown (1810–1865), New Jersey politician
- George William Brown (mayor) (1812–1890), mayor of Baltimore, Maryland
- George W. Brown (Wisconsin politician) (c. 1819–?), Wisconsin legislator from Waukesha County
- George Brown (Wisconsin politician, born 1830) (1830–1909), English-born Wisconsin politician
- George H. Brown (Lowell mayor) (1877–1950), mayor of Lowell, Massachusetts
- George Brown Jr. (1920–1999), U.S. representative from California
- George Brown Jr. (Kentucky politician) (born 1948), member of the Kentucky House of Representatives
- George L. Brown (1926–2006), Colorado politician
- Hank Brown (George Hanks Brown, born 1940), U.S. senator from Colorado

=== Other countries ===
- George Brown (South African politician) (1870–1932), Scottish-born South African trade unionist and politician
- George Deas Brown (1922–2014), Australian politician
- George Brown (Australian politician, born 1929) (1929–2002), Australian politician and Lord Mayor of Darwin, Northern Territory

== Religion ==
- George Brown (bishop of Dunkeld) (c. 1438–1515), Scottish bishop
- George Brown (Benedictine) (died 1628), English Benedictine
- George Brown (bishop of Liverpool) (1784–1856), English Roman Catholic Bishop of Liverpool
- George S. Brown (minister) (1801–1886), American Methodist preacher and missionary to Liberia
- George Brown (missionary) (1835–1917), English Methodist missionary to Fiji, Samoa, and New Britain, president-general of the Methodist Church of Australasia

== Science and medicine ==
- George Brown (inventor) (1650–1730), Scottish inventor
- George Thomas Brown (1827–1906), English veterinary surgeon
- Sir George Lindor Brown (1903–1971), English physiologist and Secretary of the Royal Society
- George Harold Brown (1908–1987), American developer of color television
- George W. Brown (computer scientist) (1917–2005), American statistician, game theorist, and computer scientist
- G. Spencer-Brown (1923–2016), English mathematician
- Sir George Malcolm Brown (1925–1997), English geologist
- George Brown (sociologist) (1930–2026), English medical sociologist

== Sports ==
=== Gridiron football ===
- George Brown (coach) (1911–1968), American football coach
- George Brown (American football, died 2008) (1923–2008), American football player
- George Brown (gridiron football, died 2013) (1923–2013), American and Canadian football player

=== Association football (soccer) ===
- George H. Brown (footballer) (1866–1903), English footballer for Notts County
- George Brown (footballer, born 1880), English footballer for Stoke, Norwich City, Millwall and Sheffield United
- George Brown (footballer, born 1883), English footballer for Southampton
- George Brown (footballer, born 1903) (1903–1948), English footballer for Huddersfield, Aston Villa, Burnley and Leeds United
- George Brown (footballer, born 1907) (1907–1988), Scottish footballer for Rangers and Scotland
- George Brown (Australian soccer) (fl. 1920s), Australian soccer player for Brisbane City, Pineapple Rovers and Australia
- George Brown (footballer, born 1928) (1928–2011), Scottish footballer for Stenhousemuir and Hamilton Academical
- George Brown (soccer, born 1935), American soccer player for New York Americans and Elizabeth Falcons
- George Brown (footballer, born 1999), Indonesian footballer
- George Brown (footballer, born 2006), English footballer for Sheffield Wednesday

=== Baseball ===
- George Brown (1910s outfielder) (1885–1955), American Negro leagues baseball outfielder
- George Brown (pitcher) (1895–1978), American Negro leagues baseball pitcher
- George Brown (1940s outfielder) (fl. 1940s), American Negro leagues baseball outfielder

=== Cricket ===
- George Brown (cricketer, born 1783) (1783–1857), English cricketer
- George Brown (cricketer, born 1821) (1821–1875), English cricketer
- George Brown (cricketer, born 1887) (1887–1964), English cricketer

=== Other sports ===
- George Daniel Brown (1836–1902), English golfer
- George Brown (rower) (1839–1875), Canadian champion single scull rower
- George V. Brown (1880–1937), American sports official and coach
- George Knockout Brown (1890–1971), American welterweight boxer
- George Brown (ice hockey) (1912–1972), Canadian ice hockey player
- George Brown (motorcyclist) (1912–1979), English motorcycle racer
- George Brown (sailor) (1915–1995), British Olympic sailor
- George Brown (rugby league, Batley) (fl. 1940s), English rugby league footballer for England and Batley
- George Brown (long jumper) (1931–2018), American long jumper
- George Brown (basketball) (1935–2016), American basketball player
- George Brown (rugby league, Castleford) (fl. 1950s–1960s), English rugby league footballer for Castleford
- George Brown (Australian footballer) (born 1959), Australian rules footballer

== Trade unions ==
- George William Brown (trade unionist) (1880–?), British trade unionist and politician
- George Brown (communist) (1906–1937), Irish-born Manchester trade unionist killed in the Spanish Civil War

== Other people ==
- Sir George McLaren Brown (1865–1939), Canadian railway administrator
- George Brown (executioner) (fl. 1911–1919), English executioner
- Igor Gouzenko (alias George Brown, 1919–1982), Soviet defector to Canada

== Other uses ==
- George Brown Polytechnic, applied arts and technology college in Toronto, Ontario, Canada
- George Brown, Class Clown, a book series by Nancy E. Krulik
- George Brown Darwin Botanic Gardens, in Darwin, Northern Territory, Australia
- George Brown & Co, a defunct Scottish shipbuilder

== See also ==
- Georg Stanford Brown (born 1943), Cuban-American actor and director
- George Browne (disambiguation)
- George Broun (disambiguation)
- Brown George, a Jamaican dessert
