= List of people educated at Ampleforth College =

This is a list of notable people educated at Ampleforth College in Yorkshire, England.

== Arts, entertainment, writing ==
- Michael Abney-Hastings, 14th Earl of Loudoun (1942–2012), British-Australian farmer made famous in the documentary Britain's Real Monarch
- Peter Bergen (born 1962), author, print and TV journalist, CNN, adjunct professor, Johns Hopkins University
- Ian Birrell, former Deputy Editor-in-Chief, The Independent; Contributing Editor, The Mail on Sunday
- Mark Burns (1936–2007), actor
- John Bunting (1927–2002), sculptor and teacher
- Mark Coreth (born 1959), animal sculptor
- Lord Anthony Crichton-Stuart (born 1961), art historian
- Vincent Cronin (1924–2011), historical writer and biographer
- Lu Edmonds (born 1957), musician (Public Image Ltd., The Damned, The Mekons, The Spizzles, The Waterboys, among others)
- Rupert Everett (born 1959), actor
- Mark Ezra (born 1950), film producer and writer
- Julian Fellowes, Baron Fellowes of West Stafford (born 1949), actor, writer and creator of Downton Abbey; Conservative peer of the House of Lords (2011–)
- Andrew Festing (born 1941), British Royal Portrait painter
- Sir Antony Gormley (born 1950), sculptor
- Harman Grisewood (1906–1997), Chief Assistant to the Director-General of the BBC, 1955–1964
- Albert Read, newspaper and magazine executive for Condé Nast
- Patrick Reyntiens (born 1925), stained glass artist
- Edward Holcroft (born 1987), film, television and stage actor
- James Honeyborne (born 1970), TV and film director
- Henry Hudson (born 1982), artist
- Geoffrey Huskinson (1935–2018), cartoonist
- Martin Jennings (born 1957), sculptor
- Andrew Knight (born 1939), journalist, editor, and media magnate
- Guy Mankowski (born 1983), writer
- John Micklethwait (born 1962), editor-in-chief of The Economist
- Red Morris, 4th Baron Killanin (born 1947), film producer
- Paul Morrissey (born 1938), film director, best known for his association with Andy Warhol.
- James Norton (born 1985), film, television and stage actor
- James O'Brien (born 1972), radio presenter and journalist
- Roderic O'Conor (1860–1940), artist
- Herbert Railton (1857–1910), illustrator
- Benedict Read (1945–2016), art historian, Senior Lecturer in Art History at the University of Leeds. Brother of Piers Paul Read (see below).
- Piers Paul Read (born 1941), writer
- Stuart Reid (born 1942), journalist, pundit
- Joe Simpson (born 1960), mountaineer and autobiographer
- Edward Stourton (born 1957), journalist
- Julian Wadham (born 1958), actor
- David Esdaile Walker (1907-1968), journalist, author
- Tom Waller (born 1974), film producer
- Michael Whitehall (born 1940), producer, agent, television personality; father of comedian Jack Whitehall
- Hugo Young (1938–2003), journalist

== Politics, law, business and nobility ==
- Michael Ancram, 14th Marquess of Lothian (1945–2024), Deputy Leader of the Conservative Party, 2001–2005
- Dominic Asquith (born 1957), Ambassador to Iraq, 2006—2007, Ambassador to Egypt, 2007–present.
- Julian Asquith, 2nd Earl of Oxford and Asquith (1916–2011), diplomat
- Raymond Asquith, 3rd Earl of Oxford and Asquith (born 1952), former diplomat and businessman
- Anthony Bamford, Lord Bamford (born 1945), Chairman, J.C.Bamford (Excavators) Ltd.
- Andrew Bertie (1929–2008), first British Grand Master of the Knights Hospitaller since 1258 (1988–2008)
- Richard Bertie, 14th Earl of Lindsey (born 1931), soldier and hereditary peer
- John Burnett, Baron Burnett (born 1945), Liberal Democrat MP for Torridge and West Devon, 1997–2001, 2001–5, Life Peer (2006–present)
- John Crichton-Stuart, 6th Marquess of Bute (1933–1993), Chairman, Historic Buildings Council for Scotland, 1983–1988, and National Museums of Scotland, 1985–1993
- Alexander Fermor-Hesketh, 3rd Baron Hesketh (born 1950), landowner and UKIP politician
- Matthew Festing (born 1949), second British Grand Master of the Knights Hospitaller since 1258 (2008–2017)
- Edward Fitzalan-Howard, 18th Duke of Norfolk (born 1956), Earl Marshal
- Major-General Miles Fitzalan-Howard, 17th Duke of Norfolk (1915–2002), Earl Marshal
- Francis Fitzherbert, 15th Baron Stafford (born 1954), landowner, peer and deputy lieutenant
- Sir Hugh Fraser (1918–1984), Secretary of State for Air, 1962–1964
- David Hennessy, 3rd Baron Windlesham (born 1932), Lord Privy Seal and Leader of the House of Lords, 1973–1974
- Auberon Herbert (1922–1974), campaigner for Eastern European causes
- Peter Kerr, 12th Marquess of Lothian (1922–2004), Scottish peer, landowner and politician
- John George (1930–2012), HM Kintyre Pursuivant of Arms, herald and author
- Sir Arthur Goodall, GCMG (born 1931), British diplomat, High Commissioner to India 1987–1991
- Grand Duke Jean of Luxembourg (1921–2019), Grand Duke of Luxembourg, 1964–2000
- Don Agustín Jerónimo de Iturbide y Huarte (1807–1866), Prince Imperial of Mexico
- Sir Jeremy Johnson (born 1971), High Court judge
- King Letsie III of Lesotho (born 1963), King of Lesotho (1990–1995, 1996–present)
- Paul Moore, (born 1958), whistleblower sacked from HBOS
- King Moshoeshoe II of Lesotho (1938–1996), King of Lesotho (1966–1970, 1970–1990, 1995–96)
- George Nelson, 8th Earl Nelson (1905–1981)
- Michael Nolan, Baron Nolan (1928–2007), Law Lord and first chairman of the Committee on Standards in Public Life
- Richard Norton, 8th Baron Grantley (born 1956), banker and politician
- William Peel, 3rd Earl Peel (born 1947), Lord Chamberlain
- Peter Hope, 4th Baron Rankeillour (1935–2005), Scottish landowner and peer
- Nick Read (born 1966), business executive, CEO of Post Office Limited
- John Home Robertson (born 1948), former Labour MP and currently Member of the Scottish Parliament
- John Scott, 4th Earl of Eldon (1899–1976)
- John Scott, 5th Earl of Eldon (1937–2017)
- Charles Stourton, 26th Baron Mowbray (1923–2006), a representative hereditary peer
- Edward Stourton, 27th Baron Mowbray (1953–2021)
- Sir Swinton Barclay Thomas (1931–2016), British judge, privy councillor, and the Interception of Communications Commissioner

== Military ==
- Michael Allmand (1923–1944), Victoria Cross recipient (posthumous). Killed In Action on 24 June 1944, in Burma
- Brigadier Andrew Parker Bowles (born 1939), soldier
- Brigadier Simon Fraser, 15th Lord Lovat (1911–1995), pioneering officer of the British Army's commandos
- Major General Lord Michael Fitzalan-Howard (1916–2007), Marshal of the Diplomatic Corps 1972–1981
- Major General Christopher John Ghika, Major-General commanding the Household Division 2019-present
- Major-General Sir Freddie de Guingand (1900–1979), Chief of Staff to Field Marshal Montgomery, 1942–1945
- Lieutenant-Colonel Sir John Johnston, Comptroller of the Lord Chamberlain's office
- Wing Commander Tony Lovell (1919–1945), flying ace of the Royal Air Force during the Second World War
- Captain Robert Nairac (1948–1977), George Cross, intelligence officer murdered by the Provisional Irish Republican Army
- Major-General Peter Grant Peterkin (born c.1947), Sergeant at Arms of the House of Commons
- Major General Sir Sebastian Roberts (1954–2023), GOC The Household Division 2003–2007
- Colonel Sir David Stirling (1915–1990), founder of the SAS
- Major Gus March-Phillipps (1908–1942), founder of No. 62 Commando

== Philosophy, history and academia ==
- Michael Clanchy (1936–2021), Professor of Medieval History, University of London
- William Dalrymple (born 1965), historian
- John Keay (born 1941), historian, journalist and radio presenter
- Angus Loughran (born 1966), journalist, commentator and pundit
- Robert Maximilian de Gaynesford (born 1968), philosopher
- Fred Halliday, (1946–2010), academic, Fellow of the British Academy, Montague Burton Professor of International Relations at London School of Economics
- Philip Lawrence (1947–1995), headmaster and murder victim
- Gabriel Turville-Petre (1908–1978), Professor of Ancient Icelandic Literature and Antiquities, University of Oxford, 1953–1975
- Henry Wansbrough (1934), Master of St Benet's Hall, Oxford, 1990–2004

== Religion ==
- Athanasius Allanson (1804–1876), Benedictine monk, and Abbot of Glastonbury, 1874–1876
- Thomas Burgess (1791–1854), Roman Catholic Bishop of Clifton, 1851–1854
- Columba Cary-Elwes (1903–1994), monastery founder, ecumenist and author
- Sheikh Abdur Raheem Green (born 1962), convert to Islam and founder of the iERA
- Ambrose Griffiths (1928–2011), Bishop of Hexham and Newcastle
- John Cuthbert Hedley (1837–1915), Roman Catholic Bishop of Newport, 1881–1915
- Basil, Cardinal Hume (1923–1999), Abbot of Ampleforth Abbey, 1963–1975, and Archbishop of Westminster, 1975–1999

== Science and medicine ==
- Peter Christopher Caldwell (1927–1979), zoologist
- Thomas Cecil Gray (1913–2008), pioneered modern anaesthetic techniques
- Bill Inman (1929–2005), pharmacovigilance pioneer
- John William Polidori (1795–1821), physician and writer

== Sport ==
- Christopher Bartle, (born 1952) equestrian, member of the GB team at the 1984 Summer Olympics
- John Bean (1913–2005), first-class cricketer and British Army officer
- John Crichton-Stuart, 7th Marquess of Bute (1958–2021), a Scottish peer and former racing driver ("Johnny Dumfries")
- Lawrence Dallaglio (born 1972), former captain of the English national rugby team
- John Dalrymple (born 1957), cricketer
- Howard Dunbar (1904–1942), cricketer
- Simon Easterby (born 1975), former member of the Ireland national rugby union team
- Guy Easterby (born 1972), former member of the Ireland national rugby union team
- Maurice Fitzgerald (born 1976), former rugby player for Biarritz and England A
- Tomas Francis, rugby player for Wales national rugby union team
- Charles Grieve (1913–2000), cricketer who played for Oxford University and Guernsey
- Edward O'Donovan Crean (born 1887), English rugby union player who was part of the first official British and Irish Lions team that toured South Africa in 1910
- Jonathan Pearce (born 1957), cricketer
