= George H. Brown =

George H. Brown may refer to:

- George H. Brown (footballer) (1866–1903), English footballer, Notts County
- George H. Brown (North Carolina judge) (1850–1926), justice of the North Carolina Supreme Court
- George H. Brown (producer) (1913–2001), British film producer
- George H. Brown (Lowell mayor) (1877–1950), mayor of Lowell, Massachusetts
- George H. Brown Jr. (born 1939), justice of the Tennessee Supreme Court
- George Harold Brown (1908–1987), American developer of color television
- George Houston Brown (1810–1865), New Jersey politician

== See also ==
- George Brown (athlete) (George Henry Brown Jr., 1931–2018), American long jumper
- George Brown (bishop of Liverpool) (George Hilary Brown, 1784–1856), English Roman Catholic Bishop of Liverpool
- George Brown (sailor) (George Herbert Brown, 1915–1995), British Olympic sailor
- George Brown (medievalist) (George Hardin Brown, fl. 1950s–2000s), American scholar of Anglo-Saxon literature
- Hank Brown (George Hanks Brown, born 1940), U.S. Senator from Colorado
- George Brown (disambiguation)
- George Browne (disambiguation)
- George Broun (disambiguation)
