= George Browne =

George Browne may refer to:

== Law and politics ==
- Sir George Browne (died 1483) (1440–1483), English politician
- George Browne (died 1631) (1583–1631), English politician
- Sir George Browne (died 1661), English politician
- Sir George Browne, 4th Baronet (1680s–1737), Irish politician
- George Browne (died 1782) (c. 1735–1782), Irish politician
- George Browne (Lower Canada politician) (before 1794–1822), Canadian politician
- George H. Browne (1818–1885), American politician
- George Eakins Browne (1837–1923), Irish politician

== Nobility ==
- George Browne, 8th Viscount Montagu (1769–1793), English nobleman
- George Browne, 3rd Marquess of Sligo (1820–1896), Irish peer
- George Browne, 6th Marquess of Sligo (1856–1935), Irish peer

== Religion ==
- George Browne (archbishop of Dublin) (died 1556), English Anglican bishop in Ireland
- George Joseph Plunket Browne (1795–1858), Irish Roman Catholic Bishop
- George Forrest Browne (1833–1930), English Anglican bishop
- George Browne (archbishop of West Africa) (1933–1993), Liberian Anglican bishop

== Sports ==
- George Browne (cricketer) (1835–1919), English cricketer
- George Browne (baseball) (1876–1920), American baseball player
- George Browne (umpire) (born 1934), West Indian cricket umpire

== Others ==
- George Browne (provost) (c. 1649–1699), English academic administrator
- George Browne (soldier) (1698–1792), Irish soldier of fortune
- George Browne (architect) (1811–1885), Irish-born Canadian architect
- Sir George Buckston Browne (1850–1945), British urologist
- Sir George Washington Browne (1853–1939), Scottish architect
- George Elmer Browne (1871–1946), American artist
- George E. Browne (fl. 1920s–1940s), American labor union leader
- Young Tiger (George Browne, 1920–2007), Trinidadian calypso musician

== See also ==
- George Brown (disambiguation)
- George Broun (disambiguation)
