= Poinciana Woman =

Australian urban legend

The Poinciana Woman is the subject of an Australian urban legend that dates back to the 1950s. There are multiple versions to the myth, but most follow the story of a woman who was raped and hanged, under a Poinciana tree, by a group of men in the East Point Reserve of Darwin, Northern Territory. It is said she haunts the East Point area, which has brought the attention of many media outlets such as the ABC and NITV.

== Legend ==
The first mentions of the Poinciana Woman date back to the 1950s, with different versions of the myth having been created since. Roland Dyrting delves into these versions in his award-winning essay "The Poinciana Woman of East Point". The essay's main depiction on the Poinciana Woman is that it is actually Pontianak (female vampiric ghost in Malay mythology) living in Darwin. This claim is backed with historical evidence of Asian migrants coming into Darwin in the late 1930s. There are many similar urban legends of women who died in tragic ways like that of the Poinciana Woman. These include the myths of the White Lady and the Lady in Red, which are ghosts that haunt public places which are directly related to the place of their demise. These two urban legends have become influential around the world and perhaps have formed an oral lore which has been transmitted into the myth of the Poinciana Woman.

The earliest mention of Poinciana Woman was in a book written by Maisie Austin, Quality of Life: A Reflection of Life in Darwin During the Post-war. This version is a spirit who meets mothers that died in childbirth underneath a frangipani tree. It also has another mention of a ghost found under a bridge at Daly Street, a road entering Darwin's CBD which is connected to the Stuart Highway and joins Darwin to Adelaide. An interview was held on ABC Radio, where one caller concurred saying she heard of the Poinciana Woman being a ghost on the Daly Street Bridge.

Like other urban legends, the Poinciana Woman seems to have spread across Australia. An ABC article was written within a project called Curious Darwin, where locals can ask questions for journalists to report on. The article contains an interview with a Darwin local who claims to have photographed the ghost at East Point Reserve. One writer from the project tells the version of the Poinciana Woman being Aboriginal and that the men who assaulted her were soldiers. This version of the story is the most popular among the Darwin locals, as it has ties with the Darwin Military museum which is in close proximity to the supposed location of the haunted Poinciana tree. The Northern Territory has the highest proportion of Aboriginals in Australia, and in the past has had racist community attitudes.

There have been some articles written in the Northern Territory News of an Indigenous man claiming the Poinciana Woman has strong ties to the folklore of the local Larrakia people. A response article was then written by former Lord Mayor George Brown, who confirmed that the Poinciana Woman was a story important to the Larrakia people. This is doubtful because there is a lack of sources containing information about the East Point Reserve being an important Larrakia site. Also, the Poinciana tree is an introduced species from Madagascar planted in the 1900s.

=== Summoning ===
To summon the Poinciana Woman, it is said that one has to be at the right location on a moonless night and spin around three times while calling out her name. This form of evocation is similar to other urban legend summoning practices such as Bloody Mary and Hanako-san, where some sort of action is repeated a number of times. A study by a PhD candidate at Durham University showed that people were attracted to stories with a survival threat and that they were likely to pass it on to another person. For these reasons the myth of the Poinciana Woman has gone viral within the community leading to many visiting the East Point site.

== Location ==
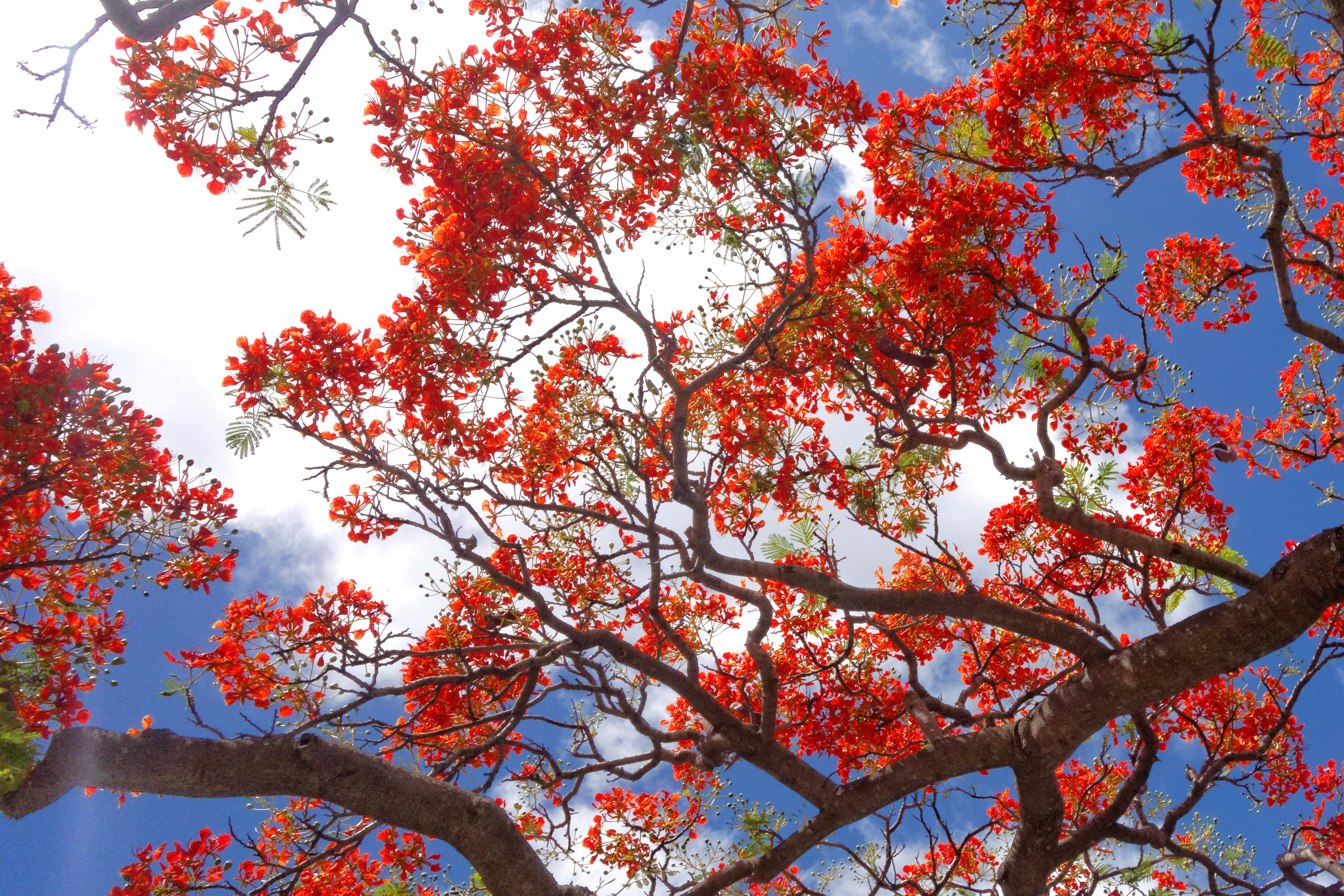
Royal poinciana

The ghost of the Poinciana Woman is said to haunt the area of the East Point Reserve. This area, now a popular place for tourists and recreation, was fortified during World War II and was the site of naval and anti-aircraft guns which has now turned into the Darwin Military Museum. Directly east of the museum is the supposed exact location of the Poinciana Woman where many Delonix regia (Royal poinciana) are growing. The tree is considered an invasive weed which grows on the southern edge of the remnant monsoon rain forest. This type of forest has the largest coverage in the Northern Territory and is under the protection of the government since it has a delicate ecosystem. Much of the rain forest was cleared for military purposes and there are now only small patches of this type of forestry in the area.

== In popular culture ==
- In an episode from the series Shadow Trackers, entitled "The Poinciana Woman", actors Hunter Page-Lochard and Zac James document their trip to Darwin in which they interview the local community to try and unveil the truth behind the urban legend of the Poinciana Woman. The show aired on NITV in October of 2016.
- Urban Thrillogy, directed by Bunji Elcoate, performed at the Darwin Festival in 2006, in an on-stage review that counts-down the Northern Territories' top five myths and legends. Poinciana Woman received first place.
- The urban legend received the award of being Darwin's "number one urban myth" by the ABC.
- A play called Smells Like Impulse, written for Darwin High School students has an act in which a girl is being chased by a group of boys until she is hiding away underneath a Poinciana tree. The girl unknowingly summons the Poinciana Woman who scares the boys away.
