= Greg Brown =

Greg Brown or Gregory Brown may refer to:

== Art ==
- Greg Brown (painter) (1951–2014), American painter from Palo Alto, California
- F Gregory Brown (1887–1941), British artist

== Music ==
- Greg Brown (folk musician) (born 1949), American folk musician
- Greg Brown (rock musician) (1970–2026), original guitarist for the band Cake
- Gregory Brown, classical pianist and member of The 5 Browns
- Gregory W. Brown (born 1974), American composer
- Greg Brown, disc jockey for WLS-FM in Chicago

== Sports ==
- Greg Brown (American football coach) (born 1957), defense coach for the Arizona Wildcats
- Greg Brown (defensive lineman) (1957–2020), retired American football defensive lineman
- Greg Brown (Australian rules footballer) (born 1943), premiership player
- Greg Brown (baseball coach) (born 1980), American baseball coach
- Greg Brown (basketball, born 1972) (1972–2024), American basketball coach and former player
- Greg Brown III (born 2001), American basketball player
- Greg Brown (footballer, born 1962), former All White and Socceroo
- Greg Brown (footballer, born 1978), English association football player
- Greg Brown (ice hockey) (born 1968), retired NHL athlete
- Greg Brown (sportscaster), announcer for the Pittsburgh Pirates

== Other ==
- Gregory S. Brown (born 1968), American historian
- Greg Brown (businessman) (born 1960), CEO of Motorola Solutions
- Gregg Brown (born 1972), English cricketer
- Gregory Brown, religious name of George Brown (died 1618), English Benedictine and prior
