= Celebrity Big Brother (British TV series) series 11 =

Coordinates: 51°39′23″N 0°16′02″W

Celebrity Big Brother
- Series 11
- Series eleven logo
- Presented by: Brian Dowling
- No. of days: 23
- No. of housemates: 11
- Winner: Rylan Clark
- Runners-up: Heidi Montag and Spencer Pratt
- Companion shows: Big Brother's Bit on the Side
- No. of episodes: 23

Release
- Original network: Channel 5
- Original release: 3 January – 25 January 2013

Series chronology
- ← Previous; Series 10 Next → Series 12

Celebrity Big Brother 11 is the eleventh series of the British reality television series Celebrity Big Brother. It launched on 3 January 2013, and aired on Channel 5 and 5* for 23 days concluding on 25 January 2013. The series is part of a new two-year contract signed by Channel 5 with Endemol to air the show until 2014.

The series was won by Rylan Clark, with Heidi Montag and Spencer Pratt as runners-up. It was the fourth celebrity series to air on Channel 5 and the sixth series of Big Brother to air on the broadcaster since they acquired the show. With an average of 2.8 million, this was the highest rated series of the show (alongside Celebrity Big Brother 8) since its move to Channel 5, until it was surpassed by Celebrity Big Brother 13 in January 2014. It was also the last series of Big Brother to be presented by Brian Dowling, who was replaced by Emma Willis from the fourteenth regular series onwards.

In 2017, Heidi and Spencer returned to the house for Celebrity Big Brother 19 as All-Stars, representing this series. They were the eighth housemates to be evicted.

== Format ==
Celebrity Big Brother is a game show in which a group of celebrity contestants, referred to as housemates, live in isolation from the outside world in a custom built "house", constantly under video surveillance. During their time in the House, the housemates are required to nominate two of their fellow contestants for potential eviction, and the two or more with the most votes would be nominated. This process is mandatory for all housemates, and failure to comply could result in expulsion from the House. The public then vote, with one of those celebrities evicted from the house. When the final week arrives, the viewers vote for which of the remaining celebrities should win the series, and the housemate with the most votes becomes the winner.

During their time in the House, housemates are given weekly tasks to perform. The housemates wager a portion of their weekly shopping budget on the task, and either win double their wagered fund or lose the wagered fund depending on their performance in the task. The housemates are required to work as a group to complete their tasks, with the format of the tasks varying based on the number of remaining housemates. Throughout the series, some housemates have been given secret tasks that must either be completed individually or with a small group; failure to do so can result in the housemate being nominated or punished in the House. Should the housemates run out of the food provided for them, an emergency ration was available to them. The housemates are forbidden from discussing nominations, and doing so could result in punishment. The format of the series is mainly seen as a social experiment, and requires housemates to interact with others who may have differing ideals, beliefs, and prejudices. Housemates are also required to make visits to the Diary Room during their stay in the House, where they are able to share their thoughts and feelings on their fellow housemates and the game.

== Housemates ==
Celebrity	Age on entry	Notability	Day entered	Day exited	Status
Rylan Clark	24	Singer and reality TV star	1	23	Winner
Heidi Montag (Note: Heidi and Spencer entered the House together on Day 1 and were treated as a single Housemate under the collective name "Heidi and Spencer" for the duration of the series.)	26	Reality TV stars	1	23	Runners-up
Spencer Pratt	29	Reality TV stars	1	23	Runners-up
Ryan Moloney	33	Actor	1	23	3rd place
Claire Richards	35	Singer	1	23	4th place
Razor Ruddock	44	Ex-footballer and TV personality	1	23	5th place
Tricia Penrose	42	Actress and singer	1	21	Evicted
Frankie Dettori	42	Jockey	1	21	Evicted
Gillian Taylforth	57	Actress	1	16	Evicted
Lacey Banghard	20	Glamour model	1	14	Evicted
Sam Robertson	27	Actor	1	9	Evicted
Paula Hamilton	52	Supermodel	1	7	Evicted

=== Claire Richards ===
Claire Richards (born 17 August 1977) is an English singer-songwriter and dancer, who is widely known around the UK for being the lead singer of the 90's pop group, Steps. The five-piece band formed back in 1997, before Richards and bandmate, Ian "H" Watkins quit the band in 2001. They later reformed in May 2011, releasing their fourth studio album and a documentary. On Day 1, she was accepted to live in the main house, beating Neil "Razor" Ruddock. On Day 23, she became the second celebrity to be evicted on the final night, finishing in fourth place.

=== Frankie Dettori ===
Lanfranco "Frankie" Dettori, MBE (born 15 December 1970) is an Italian horse racing jockey. Dettori has been Champion Jockey on three occasions and has ridden the winners of more than 520 group races. On Day 1, he became the first celebrity to enter the house and to which he and fellow housemate, Rylan Clark were set a task by Big Brother to watch each celebrities VT's and decide which celebrities should live in the main luxury house or the basement. On Day 3, he was nominated for eviction by his fellow basement housemates, before returning to the luxury house. On Day 21, two days before the final, Frankie became the fifth person evicted from the house in a double eviction, alongside Tricia Penrose.

=== Gillian Taylforth ===
Gillian Taylforth (born 14 August 1955) is an English actress, most notable for her portrayal as Kathy Beale in the BBC soap-opera, EastEnders from 1985 to 2000. Her other acting roles include starring as Jackie Pascoe-Webb in Footballer's Wives and Sgt. Nikki Wright in The Bill. On Day 1, Taylforth was accepted into the main house, beating Ryan Moloney. On Day 16, Taylforth had received the fewest votes and was evicted. She exited the house via the diary room due to heavy snow in the main entrance.

=== Heidi Montag and Spencer Pratt ===
Heidi Montag (born 15 September 1986) and Spencer Pratt (born 14 August 1983), known collectively as "Speidi", are an American reality television couple based from Los Angeles, California. They are best known for starring in the MTV reality series The Hills from 2006 to 2010. On Day 1, they were sent to the basement by Dettori and Clark, and acted as one housemate. On Day 7, after Paula's eviction, Big Brother set Heidi and Spencer a secret task, which was to stage a walkout in front of their fellow housemates but unbeknownst to them, they were actually in a revamped basement, watching the other celebrities in the main house. On Day 9, the couple re-entered the house. On both occasions in which they were eligible to be nominated, Heidi and Spencer have received a vote from each housemate, enough to receive the most nominations of all the series of Celebrity Big Brother. On Day 23, they were placed as runners-up of the competition, despite their hatred and disliking reputation during the process of the competition. Both of them later returned to compete in Celebrity Big Brother 19 as an "All-Star" housemate.

=== Lacey Banghard ===
Lacey Banghard (born 28 April 1992) is an English glamour model and The Sun's Page 3 girl, from Bedfordshire, England. On Day 1, Banghard was accepted into the main house, beating actor Sam Robertson. On Day 14, she became the third celebrity to be evicted from the house, losing to Claire, Rylan and Heidi and Spencer.

=== Paula Hamilton ===
Paula Hamilton (born 23 January 1958) is an English model, best known for her appearance in the classic 1987 Mk II Volkswagen Golf TV advert, Changes. In 2006, she returned to the public eye as a judge on Sky Living's Britain's Next Top Model, for two cycles. During her career, she has featured in music videos, appeared in feature films, been addicted to drugs and had lost her two front teeth, whilst in drink driving accident back in November 2012. On Day 1, Hamilton was sent to the basement, losing to actress Tricia Penrose. In the early hours of Day 2, Hamilton fell ill and a doctor suggested that she move from the basement to the main house. She received the fewest votes and was the first celebrity to be evicted from the house on Day 7, losing to Heidi and Spencer and Frankie. On Day 20, she made a return to the house as part of the housemate's shopping task.

=== Razor Ruddock ===
Neil "Razor" Ruddock (born 9 May 1968) is an English former professional footballer, actor and television personality. On Day 1, he was sent to the basement, after losing to Claire Richards. It was reported that Ruddock was a last-minute replacement for comedian Jim Davidson, who pulled out of appearing in the show after being arrested by police investigating the Jimmy Savile sex abuse scandal. He was the first person to be eliminated on Day 23, finishing in fifth place.

=== Ryan Moloney ===
Ryan Moloney (born 24 November 1979) is an Australian actor, best known for his portrayal as Jarrod "Toadfish" Rebecchi in the Australian-based soap opera, Neighbours, since 1995. On Day 1, he was sent to the basement, after losing to Gillian Taylforth. He was the third to be evicted on Day 23, finishing in third place.

=== Rylan Clark ===
Ross Richard "Rylan" Clark (born 25 October 1988) is an actor, model, TV presenter and singer from Corringham, Essex, best known as a contestant on the ninth series of The X Factor. He reached to the quarter-finals before being eliminated and was mentored by former Pussycat Doll lead singer, Nicole Scherzinger. As an actor, he revealed he was Ron Weasley's body double in the Harry Potter film series and had a minor role in the film, Love Actually. He appeared in several boyband tributes for Take That and Westlife, before his audition at The X Factor. It had been reported that Clark left the house on Sundays (days 3, 10 and 17) to rehearse for The X Factor 2013 live tour, which led to media speculation. On Day 1, he and Frankie Dettori were set a secret task by Big Brother to watch each celebrities VT's and judge whether they should live in the main luxury house or the dreaded basement. On Day 23, Clark emerged as the winner of Celebrity Big Brother 11, beating fellow housemates and runners-up, Heidi and Spencer. Shortly after his Big Brother victory, he became the new presenter for its spin-off show, Big Brother's Bit on the Side.

=== Sam Robertson ===
Samuel "Sam" Robertson (born 11 October 1985) is a Scottish actor, best known for his acting role as Flynn Spencer in the E4 comedy-drama Beaver Falls. Before starring in Beaver Falls, he had made an appearance as Adam Barlow in the ITV soap opera, Coronation Street. On Day 1, he was sent to the basement, after Frankie Dettori and Rylan Clark chose model Lacey Banghard over him to enter the main house. He received the fewest votes and was evicted from the house on Day 9, losing to Ryan Moloney.

=== Tricia Penrose ===
Patricia "Tricia" Penrose (born 9 April 1970) is an English actress and singer, best known for her acting role as Gina Ward in ITV's longest-running drama Heartbeat, from 1993 to 2010. She has also appeared in shows such as The Royal and Coronation Street. On Day 1, Tricia was accepted into the main house, beating model Paula Hamilton. On Day 21, she became the sixth person to be evicted from the house, missing out on a place in the final, along with Frankie Dettori. Penrose is also a close friend of Celebrity Big Brother 9 winner, Denise Welch.

== Nominations table ==
	Day 4	Day 7	Day 11	Day 14	Day 23 Final		Nominations received
Rylan	Heidi & Spencer, Lacey	Sam, Ryan	Heidi & Spencer, Lacey	No nominations	Winner (Day 23)		3
Heidi & Spencer	Rylan, Gillian	In Luxury; Basement	Claire, Rylan	No nominations	Runners-up (Day 23)		18
Ryan	Paula, Heidi & Spencer	Sam, Rylan	Heidi & Spencer, Razor	No nominations	Third place (Day 23)		5
Claire	Heidi & Spencer, Paula	Sam, Ryan	Heidi & Spencer, Lacey	No nominations	Fourth place (Day 23)		3
Razor	Heidi & Spencer, Lacey	Lacey, Sam	Heidi & Spencer, Lacey	No nominations	Fifth place (Day 23)		5
Tricia	Heidi & Spencer, Sam	Sam, Razor	Heidi & Spencer, Lacey	No nominations	Evicted (Day 21)		1
Frankie	Heidi & Spencer, Paula	Ryan, Razor	Lacey, Heidi & Spencer	No nominations	Evicted (Day 21)		0
Gillian	Paula, Heidi & Spencer	Sam, Ryan	Heidi & Spencer, Lacey	No nominations	Evicted (Day 16)		2
Lacey	Heidi & Spencer, Claire	Razor, Ryan	Razor, Heidi & Spencer	Evicted (Day 14)			9
Sam	Heidi & Spencer, Gillian	Claire, Tricia	Evicted (Day 9)				8
Paula	Heidi & Spencer, Sam	Evicted (Day 7)					4
Notes	1	2	3	4	5		
Against public vote	Frankie, Heidi & Spencer, Paula	Ryan, Sam	Claire, Heidi & Spencer, Lacey, Rylan	Claire, Frankie, Gillian, Heidi & Spencer, Razor, Ryan, Rylan, Tricia	Claire, Frankie, Heidi & Spencer, Razor, Ryan, Rylan, Tricia		
Evicted	Paula; Fewest votes to save	Sam; Fewest votes to save	Lacey; Fewest votes to save	Gillian; Fewest votes to save	Frankie; Fewest votes (out of 7)	Tricia; Fewest votes (out of 6)	
Evicted	Paula; Fewest votes to save	Sam; Fewest votes to save	Lacey; Fewest votes to save	Gillian; Fewest votes to save	Razor; Fewest votes (out of 5)	Claire; Fewest votes (out of 4)	
Evicted	Paula; Fewest votes to save	Sam; Fewest votes to save	Lacey; Fewest votes to save	Gillian; Fewest votes to save	Ryan; Fewest votes (out of 3)	Heidi & Spencer; Fewest votes (out of 2)	
Evicted	Paula; Fewest votes to save	Sam; Fewest votes to save	Lacey; Fewest votes to save	Gillian; Fewest votes to save	Rylan; Most votes to win		

Notes

- ^Note 1: As Frankie sacrificed himself on Day 3 to end the basement twist, he was automatically nominated for eviction. The rest of the housemates nominated on Day 4; Frankie could nominate but could not be nominated.
- ^Note 2: Shortly after Paula's eviction on Day 7, Heidi and Spencer were given a secret mission to stage a walkout but they would actually be heading back down to the Basement. As they were in the Basement, they missed out on face-to-face nominations and could not be nominated either, but watched live from the basement.
- ^Note 3: Shortly after Sam's eviction on Day 9, Heidi and Spencer returned to the house. However, before they re-entered they had to choose the two most boring housemates. These housemates would then automatically be nominated for the next eviction. They chose Claire and Rylan. The remaining housemates nominated on Day 11 to decide who else would join them. Because Claire and Rylan were automatically facing eviction, the remaining housemates could not nominate them, but they themselves still nominated.
- ^Note 4: Shortly after Lacey's eviction on Day 14, Razor and Ryan were punished for discussing nominations. As a result, all of the housemates were put up for eviction.
- ^Note 5: For the final week the public were voting for who they wanted to win rather than to save. The two housemates with the fewest votes were evicted on Day 21.

== Summary ==
Day 1	Entrances	Frankie, Rylan, Paula, Tricia, Ryan, Gillian, Sam, Lacey, Claire, Razor and Heidi and Spencer entered the house.
Day 1	Tasks	The first two housemates, Frankie and Rylan, entered the house together and were immediately called to the Diary Room to be given a task. They were told the remaining housemates would be entering in pairs and they would have to decide which of the pair would go to the Luxury House and which one would live in the Basement. To help make the decisions, Frankie and Rylan were allowed to watch the housemate's VT. They sent Tricia, Gillian, Lacey and Claire to the Luxury House and chose Paula, Ryan, Sam and Razor to live in the Basement. Finally they had a choice to send themselves down to the Basement or Heidi and Spencer, they chose Heidi and Spencer.
Day 2	Tasks	In order to win hot water for the whole house, one of the Basement housemates had to complete a task. The luxury house originally decided that Heidi and Spencer should take part in the task but they refused, Ryan then stepped in and won hot water for everyone.
Day 2	Events	In the early hours of the morning, Paula took ill and was advised by the doctor to move into the Luxury House. In the late hours, the Luxury House banished Frankie to the Basement, this then gave him the power to choose a housemate from the Basement to move up the Luxury House. He chose Heidi and Spencer.
Day 3	Tasks	To win electricity and a cooked breakfast for the house, the Luxury Housemates chose Sam and Frankie from the Basement to take part in the task. As the completed they task, they won a cooked breakfast for the Basement and tinned breakfast for the Luxury House.
Day 3	Events	The Basement housemates were asked to sacrifice one of their own and chose Frankie to automatically face eviction, after making the decision they moved out of the Basement and into the Luxury House.
Day 4	Nominations	The housemates nominated for the first time. Heidi and Spencer and Paula received the most nominations and faced the public vote with Frankie.
Day 5	Tasks	For the first shopping task, a Randomizer machine was located in the house which contained one green ball saying "PASS" and one red ball saying "FAIL". The celebrities must play a number of mini-tasks to win balls to go in the machine. For every pass they get, a green ball will be added to the machine, and for every fail, a red ball. At the end of the task a ball will be selected at random, and the outcome of the task would depend on the colour of the ball. As it stands, housemates have a 50/50 chance of passing. The first mini-task was called Pass The Pass where the celebrities had to pass disgusting items to each other using their mouths only. For the second mini-task, Rylan was called to the Diary Room and had to find the normal chocolates in a box of chilli chocolates. The third task was Kissing Balls where the celebrities, in pairs, had to capture ping pong balls between their lips. The final mini-task of the day, Claire was sent to the small task room and was forced to listen to 5,6,7,8 on a loop. At the end of the day, the celebrities had a 75% chance of receiving a luxury shopping budget.
Day 6	Tasks	The shopping task continued and Paula and Heidi were called to the Diary Room and asked questions about their fellow housemates. Meanwhile, the remaining housemates took turns to sit on a chair suspended above a pool of gunge in the garden. As the celebrity took their place on the chair, Paula and Heidi would be asked a question about them. If they got the answer right, the celebrity would escape the gunge, however an incorrect answer would mean the celebrity would go face-first into it. At the end of the shopping task, housemates had a 72% chance of passing. Sam was chosen to select a ball from the Randomizer machine, as it was a green ball celebrities passed their shopping task and won a luxury food budget.
Day 7	Tasks	Rylan was given a secret task in which he had to get emotional towards the nominated housemates and then cry. He had to recreate the famous X Factor crying scene without them suspecting anything.
Day 7	Exits	Paula was the first housemate to be evicted from the house, receiving the fewest votes to save.
Day 7	Twists	Not long after Paula's eviction, Heidi and Spencer were called to the Diary Room and were congratulated for surviving eviction. They were also set a secret mission where they had to convince their fellow housemates that they were leaving through the back door because they have had enough. After completing their mission they were granted immunity from the next eviction and secretly moved back to the new Luxury Basement where they will live there for 48 hours and watch the other housemates live.
Day 7	Nominations	The housemates nominated for the second time face-to-face. Ryan and Sam received the most nominations and faced the public vote.
Day 8	Tasks	In the basement, Heidi and Spencer were asked to choose a housemate to go to the Diary Room and ask questions to. They chose Ryan. If Heidi and Spencer did not like Ryan's responses, they could push a button which would drop dog food onto Ryan's head, which they did.
Day 9	Tasks	Still spying on the house, Heidi and Spencer were asked to choose five housemates which will "Tell It Like It Is" to each other and give some brutal home truths. Claire, Lacey, Razor, Rylan and Tricia were chosen to do this and as Heidi and Spencer thought Lacey was the most honest, she was rewarded with a phone call from home.
Day 9	Exits	Sam was the second housemate to be evicted from the house, receiving the fewest votes to save.
Day 9	Twists	Shortly after Sam was evicted, Heidi and Spencer returned to the house. But they were given a decision to make, they had to choose the two most boring housemates. The two housemates they chose would automatically face eviction, they chose Claire and Rylan. Housemates will nominate as usual on Day 11 to decide who else will be nominated.
Day 9	Events	After arriving back in the house, there were a number of arguments between Heidi and Spencer and the other housemates. One included Razor standing up for his fellow housemates and aggressively calling Spencer a bully. Razor was then given a formal warning for this and Heidi and Spencer were told to go back to the basement for their own safety.
Day 10	Tasks	Lacey took part in a quiz set by Big Brother to win the housemates a banquet. If she got more correct answers or equal to the number in the envelope, then she would win the task. Unbeknownst to her, for ever incorrect answer she gave, Razor would be waxed. She passed by getting 6 out of 11 questions correct.
Day 11	Nominations	The housemates nominated for the third time, Heidi and Spencer and Lacey received the most nominations and faced the public vote with Claire and Rylan.
Day 11	Tasks	Housemates were given the chance to win invitations to a party. Each housemate had to wear a shock suit and choose another housemate to play for. One by one, they had to press their buzzer after one minute. But once the buzzer was pressed, the housemate they had chosen to play for got an electric shock. The five housemates who got a shock closest to one minute won invitations to a party. These were Gillian, Frankie, Tricia, Razor and Claire.
Day 12	Events	Big Brother asked Heidi and Spencer to return to the main house.
Day 12	Tasks	Big Vendor came alive and asked the housemates what each of their talents are. As it only recognized Rylan and Claire's singing as talent, it chose those two to lead separate teams and perform a song with their team. Claire's team, which featured Heidi and Spencer, Lacey and Frankie, performed Reach by S Club 7. Rylan's team, which featured Razor, Gillian, Tricia and Ryan, performed Tragedy by Steps. At the end of both performances, Big Vendor announced Rylan's team as the winners.
Day 13	Tasks	For the latest shopping task, Frankie became dictator and seized power of the whole house. Ryan and Razor were chosen as his guards for the task. Frankie moved into the Golden Palace, formerly known as the Gym, where as the civilian had to stay in the house. All the civilians had to do was obey Frankie's rules, and if they did not they would end up in jail. However, unbeknownst to Frankie and the guards, the civilians were given a task of their own to form a revolution and overthrow the dictator, which was the real shopping task. The first thing Frankie did as dictator was confiscate all of the housemate's beauty products and Rylan's cigarettes. Rylan's first mission as part of the revolution was to get himself sent to jail where there would be hidden explosives that he must steal without the guards knowing. Claire and Lacey were also given a secret task during their meal with the dictator, they had to debug Frankie's phone and swap the keys to the beauty products with a fake set. They succeeded and won luxury food for the civilians, which they had to hide from the guards. Frankie then rewarded the civilians a silent disco which was watched by the guards. Meanwhile, Frankie was in his Golden Palace answering questions from Big Brother about the other housemates, and the answers were played through the civilian's headphones so that they could hear everything. The civilians had to pretend that everything was normal and they were still listening to music.
Day 14	Tasks	The civilian/dictator shopping task continued. Whilst Frankie was giving a live speech to the civilians, Rylan led the revolution to follow specific objectives from Big Brother to overthrow Frankie as dictator. These included tearing down all of the propaganda posters, defacing the large flag in the garden, defacing all of the banners in the garden with red paint, unlocking the box containing their banned items and retrieving them all, planting explosives in the statue of Frankie then detonating them to destroy it, and finally, capturing Frankie and his guards using a net. As they successfully completed all of these, housemates won a luxury shopping budget.
Day 14	Exits	Lacey was the third housemate to be evicted from the house, receiving the fewest votes to save.
Day 14	Punishments	Not long after Lacey's eviction, Big Brother punished Razor and Ryan for discussing nominations. Their punishment was that all housemates, including themselves, would face eviction on Friday.
Day 15	Tasks	Ryan was called to the Diary Room and was given a secret mission to complete. He had a secret earpiece and was told to follow instructions from either Razor (The Angel) or Rylan (The Devil). Razor was giving Ryan nice instructions where as Rylan was giving him evil ones. As Ryan passed the task without the other housemates suspecting anything, he won a party for the housemates.
Day 15	Events	As a punishment for discussing nominations, Gillian and Heidi and Spencer were not allowed to attend the party. Instead they had to spend time together in the igloo in Pearly King and Queens costumes and have a right cockney knees up. They were forced to speak in cockney rhyming slang and were treated with jellied eels and cockles.
Day 16	Events	Big Brother told the housemates that he was fed up with them not getting dressed and that celebrities should be dressed like celebrities. If they all did not get dressed, then Big Brother would take action. As Heidi and Spencer were the only housemates properly dressed, Big Brother had no choice but to turn the hot water off.
Day 16	Tasks	Heidi and Spencer were split and became team captains for their genders. Each team competed in a series of endurance challenges in which they had to keep their heads perfectly still while they were being tormented by a variety of nasty surprises. Each flinch or twist of the head would earn a fail for their team and the team with the lowest number of fails at the end of the game would be the overall winners. However, as team captains, Heidi and Spencer avoided the torment and each chose what distractions the opposing team would face. As the girls remained more still than the boys, they were the winners of the task. As a result of everyone completing the task to Big Brother's satisfaction, the hot water was turned back on.
Day 16	Exits	Gillian was the fourth housemate to be evicted from the house, receiving the fewest votes to save.
Day 17	Tasks	Heidi and Spencer were called to the Diary Room and were told that they had won a poll as the housemate viewers would most like to be interviewed on "Big Blogger", an internet based show. They were told that they would be answering questions from a competition winner 'SuzyEssex'. However, this is all fake and the other housemates were in on the hoax. As Heidi and Spencer were being interviewed in the large task room, the other housemates watched the whole thing from the house. The housemates then posed as SuzyEssex to ask Heidi and Spencer questions about their opinions on other housemates and events in the house. As Heidi and Spencer believed the whole thing, housemates passed the task and won an American party.
Day 18	Tasks	Big Brother told the housemates that they would each get a chance to win a letter from home, but to do this they would face some dilemmas. To receive a letter, all they have to do is accept the dilemma. First Tricia was called to the Diary Room and was asked to rate each housemate's letter in order of priority. If one housemate declined the dilemma then the housemate who was ranked the least priority by Tricia would not get their letter. If two housemates declined, then the two housemates who were ranked the least priority would not receive their letters, and so on. As Tricia successfully ranked the letters, she passed her part of the task. Rylan was told he had to shave 50% of his facial hair in order to pass his part of the task, he was successful. Claire had to 'take to the Steps' every time a crowd noise was played into the house and walk up and down the stairs until the crowd noise was played again, she was successful. Ryan had to become his Neighbours character, Toadie. He had to wear a toad costume and jump to wherever he wanted to go, he was also successful. Razor and Frankie had a joint task as Frankie became a jockey and Razor became a horse. Wherever any of them wanted to go, Frankie had to ride Razor like a horse. Both of these were successful. However, Heidi and Spencer refused to take part in their part of the task which was to be apart from each other until further notice. This resulted in Claire not receiving her letter.
Day 18	Events	As Big Brother gathered all of the housemates in the living area to give them their letters, they all decided to make a stand against Heidi and Spencer for not taking part in the earlier task. Every housemate apart from Heidi and Spencer refused to read their letter from home.
Day 19	Tasks	The housemates were split into two teams, the boys on one team and girls on another team to settle the question of who is better, male or female? As there were five males and three females, Razor had to join the girls' team and dress like a girl. Heidi and Spencer also refused to take part in the task, so they would be punished later. The housemates competed in a number of different games to decide who was better. First, Ryan and Tricia both took part in an obstacle course which was all about multi-tasking. They had to park a car, empty their shopping bags, answer the phone and then change a baby. As Tricia completed the course in the quickest time, the girls had the advantage. Next, Razor and Rylan took part in a maths challenge in the Diary Room and had to answer sums that Big Brother asked them, but there were some distractions. Razor won this challenge and earned another point for the girls. For the third part in the task, the boys and girls had to compete to see who sweats the most. They all wore plastic sweat suits and had to get as physical as they could to see who would gather the most sweat. The boys won this part in the task. Overall, the girls won 2-1 and won a hen party for themselves. As a further reward, the girls got their letters from home, which they had previously refused to read.
Day 19	Punishments	As punishment for Heidi and Spencer not taking part in the task, Big Brother removed their bed from the house.
Day 20	Tasks	For the shopping task, housemates had to dress to impress whilst being secretly watched and judged by Paula, who had returned to the house as part of this task. Paula had to select the most stylish housemate to join her in the large task room and be part of the fashion police, she chose Rylan. Paula and Rylan then had to choose the two most unfashionable housemates to transform them. Ryan and Tricia were both chosen and Rylan and Paula had to give them three different outfits to try on to make them look stylish. Rylan presented a fashion show which concluded the task and gave Ryan and Tricia a chance to show off their new looks.
Day 21	Tasks	Jamie East entered the house to host a new game show called "Viewer's Venom". The housemates had to get into two teams and answer questions which included viewer's brutal opinions about them, all housemates had to do was guess who the viewers were talking about.
Day 21	Exits	Frankie and Tricia were the fifth and sixth housemate to be evicted from the house, receiving the fewest votes to save, respectively.
Day 21	Events	Ryan and Rylan received their letters from home again after refusing to read them the previous time.
Day 22	Tasks	Housemates were given a Last Supper task and answered specific questions relating to their Big Brother experience. At the end of all of the questions, they were asked to stand up individually and make a speech.
Day 23	Exits	Razor left in fifth place, Claire left the house in fourth place and Ryan left the house in third place. Rylan was then announced as the winner, leaving Heidi and Spencer as the runners-up.

== The Basement ==
On launch night, Big Brother announced that half of the housemates would be moved to the Main House or the Basement. On Day 2, the Main House housemates had to vote for one housemate to enter the basement, and that housemate had to choose another to enter the Main House from the basement. Frankie and Heidi and Spencer were chosen respectively. The twist came to an end on day 3 after Frankie was chosen to face the first eviction by his fellow housemates.

Housemate	Day 1	Vote	Day 2
Claire	Main House	Frankie	Main House
Frankie	Main House	Rylan	Basement
Gillian	Main House	Frankie	Main House
Heidi and Spencer	Basement	Ineligible	Main House
Lacey	Main House	Frankie	Main House
Paula	Basement	Exempt	Main House
Razor	Basement	Ineligible	Basement
Ryan	Basement	Ineligible	Basement
Rylan	Main House	Frankie	Main House
Sam	Basement	Ineligible	Basement
Tricia	Main House	Rylan	Main House

- On Day 1, Frankie and Rylan decided every housemate's fate as to who would move in the Main House or the Basement.
- In the early hours of Day 2, Paula was medically evacuated to the Main House after falling ill.
- In the late hours of Day 2, the Main House voted to banish Frankie to the Basement. Frankie then won the power to choose his replacement, and chose Heidi and Spencer.
- On Day 7, Heidi and Spencer returned to the new Luxury Basement after completing their secret mission of staging a walkout.
- On Day 9, Heidi and Spencer left the Basement and returned to the main house again. However, after several heated arguments with their fellow housemates, they moved back downstairs so they could calm down.
- On Day 12, Heidi and Spencer were banished from the Basement.

== Production ==
=== Logo ===
The official new eye logo for Celebrity Big Brother 11 was introduced on 30 November 2012. The new logo design follows the same pattern as for Big Brother 13 and Celebrity Big Brother 10, but with a new winter theme.

=== House ===
The official pictures of the Celebrity Big Brother 11 House, which features a winter theme, were released on 27 December 2012. The House features the same layout as the previous layout, with minor changes. The garden, again, has a pool and a hot tub.

=== Sponsorship ===
This series is sponsored by beds retailer Dreams, who previously sponsored the sixth and seventh series. Many of the decorative items and furniture are from very.co.uk. The show features product placement from Aquafresh, Maximuscle, L'Oréal and Lucozade.

== Ratings ==
Official ratings are taken from BARB.

	Official viewers (millions)			
	Week 1		Week 2	Week 3
Saturday		2.41	2.54	2.11
Sunday		2.37	2.6	2.35
Monday		2.34	2.43	2.59
Tuesday		2.43	2.82	2.83
Wednesday		2.51	2.45	2.24
Thursday	3.61	2.38	2.28	2.26
Friday	2.15	2.56	2.7	3.42
Weekly average	2.53		2.55	2.54
Running average	2.53		2.54	2.54
Series average	2.54			
blue-coloured boxes denote live shows.
