= Celebrity Five Go to... =

British reality television series

Celebrity Five Go to... is a British reality show first broadcast on Channel 4. First shown on Channel 4 on 10 January 2011, the show is narrated by Jane McDonald.

Five celebrities go on holiday together to compete to be the best tour guide for the group. Over two days, each celebrity is given the chance to organize different activities for the group. On the third day the group must secretly vote for who they feel has delivered the worst experience for the group, with this person being sent home. Over the remaining days, two more celebrities are voted off, before, in a twist unknown to the remaining two celebrities, the locals of the village in which they have been staying, and with whom they have been interacting, vote for who they think is the best tour guide.

Each series comprises five episodes. The first series sees the celebrities visit Turkey; the celebrities visit South Africa in the second series. The third series takes place in Lanzarote.

== Series 1 ==
Broadcast 10–14 January 2011

- Russell Grant (astrologer)
- Emma Ridley (1980s wild child)
- Jan Leeming (former newsreader)
- Antony Costa (ex-Blue singer) – winner
- Derek Conway (ex-Tory MP)

== Series 2 ==
Broadcast 23–27 May 2011

- Stuart Baggs (ex-wannabe Apprentice)
- Paula Hamilton (model and Britain's Next Top Model judge)
- Christopher Biggins (actor)
- Sheila Ferguson (ex-Three Degrees singer)
- Ed Giddins (ex-cricketer)

== Series 3 ==
Broadcast 9–13 January 2012

- James Redmond
- Bianca Gascoigne
- Rosie Millard
- Derek Acorah
- Ken Morley
