= Wired UK =

British magazine

- Cover of the January/February 2024 issue
- Editor: Greg Williams, James Temperton (Wired.co.uk)
- Categories: Technology, Business, lifestyle, thought leadership
- Frequency: Quarterly
- Circulation: 57,497 (Jul – Dec 2013); Print and digital editions.
- Publisher: Nick Sargent
- First issue: May 2009; 17 years ago (present form)
- Company: Condé Nast Britain
- Country: United Kingdom
- Language: English
- Website: wired.co.uk

Wired UK is a bimonthly magazine that reports on developments in science and technology. It covers a broad range of topics including design, architecture, culture, the economy, politics and philosophy. Owned by Condé Nast Publications, it is published in London and is an offshoot of the original American Wired.

== History ==
=== Earlier version (mid–1990s) ===
Cover of the April 1995 launch issue

The magazine's current incarnation follows an earlier attempt at a British edition of Wired which ran from April 1995 until March 1997. It was initially created as a joint venture with the Guardian Media Group and Wired US's then owners, Wired Ventures, but that incarnation lasted only three or four issues, due to a culture clash between the two parties and low sales figures of 25,000 per month. Wired Ventures then ran the UK edition alone, with an almost entirely new staff, until the magazine was closed with the March 1997 issue, when sales were at 40,000 magazines per month.

=== Current version (2009–2026) ===
The current version of the magazine was launched in April 2009, and was the second international version of Wired, after the launch of Wired Italia in March 2009. In November 2009, the British Society of Magazine Editors awarded Launch of the Year to former Wired editor David Rowan. During the same year, Albert Read was announced as publishing director of Wired UK. Wired's former deputy editor, Greg Williams took over from Rowan as editor in January 2017. Michael Rundle (formerly of Huffington Post UK) took over from Nate Lanxon as editor for WIRED.co.uk in March 2015. The current website editor is James Temperton.

In 2011, 2014, and 2015 Wired UK was named as the magazine of the year by the Digital Magazine Awards.

Wired UK published ten issues a year, before switching to a bi-monthly schedule in December 2017. The magazine announced the JAN-FEB 2025 edition would be its last, before changing to a quarterly format.

The Winter 2025 issue was the final edition of Wired UK, with the magazine announcing it had ceased physical publishing in early 2026.

== Wired conference ==
Wired UK, together with Telefonica, held a two-day event on 25–26 October 2012 at The Brewery in London. The conference was designed to "explore the ideas, innovations and people that are reshaping our world". Among its speakers were David Karp, founder of microblogging platform Tumblr, and Mona Eltahawy, an Egyptian-American freelance journalist and commentator.

Wired 2011, hosted between 13–14 October at the St. Pancras Renaissance London Hotel, included guest speakers Joanna Shields, Managing Director and Vice President of Facebook EMEA, and Gil Hirsch, founder of Face.com.

Wired 2015, hosted at Tobacco Dock between 15–16 October, includes MIT Media Lab's Alex Pentland, René Redzepi, an owner and head chef at Noma restaurant, data-visualisation historian Max Roser, journalist Gillian Tett, and North Korean defector Hyeonseo Lee.
