= Monk Dawson =

1998 film

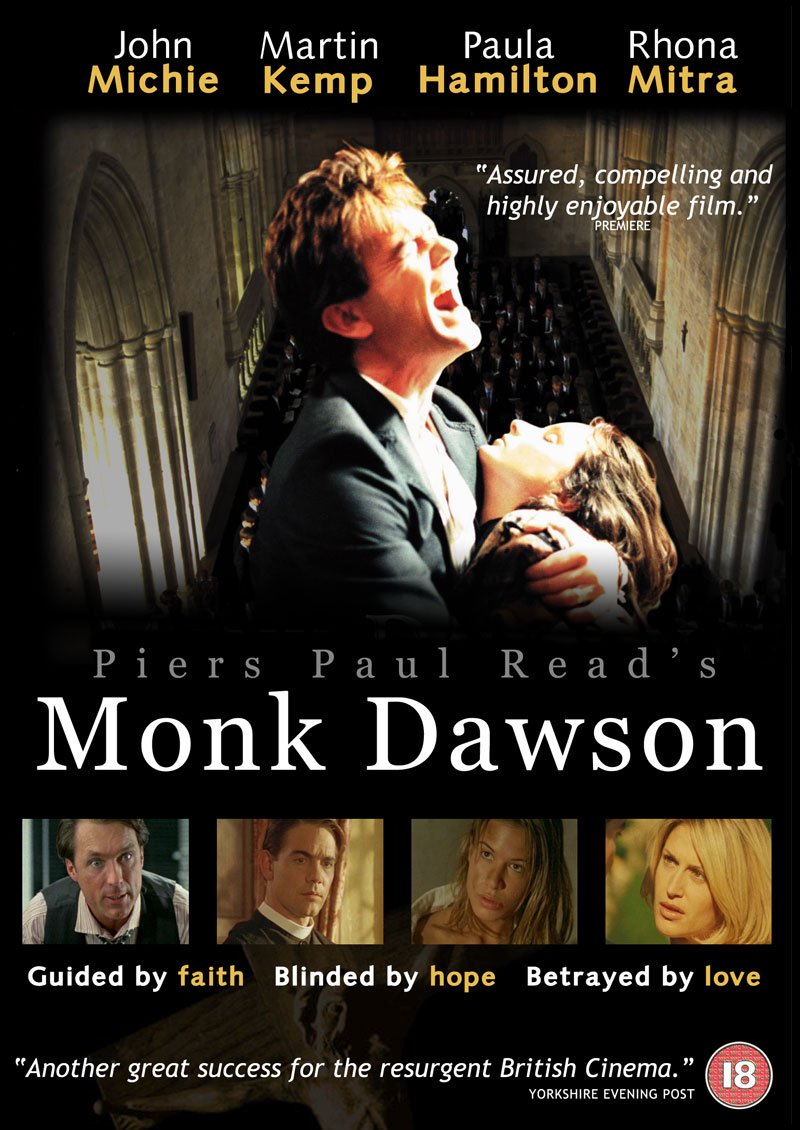
- DVD cover
- Directed by: Tom Waller
- Screenplay by: James Magrane; Matthew McIntyre
- Based on: Monk Dawson by Piers Paul Read
- Produced by: Tom Waller
- Starring: John Michie; Benedict Taylor; Martin Kemp
- Cinematography: Teoh Gay Hian
- Edited by: Tom Waller
- Music by: Mark Jensen
- Production company: De Warrenne Pictures
- Distributed by: Southern Star Entertainment; Winstone Film Distributors
- Release date: 31 July 1998
- Running time: 104 minutes
- Country: United Kingdom
- Language: English

Monk Dawson is a 1998 British drama film directed and produced by Tom Waller and starring John Michie, Benedict Taylor, Martin Kemp, Rhona Mitra, and Paula Hamilton. It was based on the 1969 novel of the same name by Piers Paul Read. In Canada and the United States the film was re-released in 2004 as Passion of the Priest.

== Plot ==
Eddie Dawson is a monk who has led a sheltered existence at a Benedictine monastery, but when he is expelled from his order he has to learn to deal with the harsh realities of everyday life in 1970s London, finding work as a journalist. He falls in love with a beautiful widow then discovers she has been having an affair with his best friend.

Eddie later marries a young girl who he first met while a priest in the parish, however he decides to return to live as a monk on a remote island.

== Reception ==
Despite being well received by film critics, it had a short box office run in the United Kingdom, with a gross of just £7,210, and a straight to video release for the United States market.

The film was chosen as the closer for the Leeds International Film Festival, and in 1999 it was also nominated for Best Film at the UK Creative Freedom Awards.
