= We'll Support You Evermore =

1985 BBC tv film

- Directed by: Douglas Livingstone
- Screenplay by: Douglas Livingstone
- Starring: John Thaw; Christopher Fulford; Ciarán Hinds; Nicholas Le Prevost; Paula Hamilton
- Production company: BBC
- Release date: 14 July 1985
- Running time: 87 minutes
- Country: United Kingdom
- Language: English

We'll Support You Evermore is a British television movie of 1985 written and directed by Douglas Livingstone, starring John Thaw and Ciarán Hinds, about a troubled period in the history of Northern Ireland.

== Plot ==
Geoff Hollins (John Thaw) is the father of David Hollins (Christopher Fulford), a young British Army officer serving in Northern Ireland who has been found brutally murdered. The circumstances are mysterious, even before Hollins finds his son's girlfriend Siobhan O'Hagan (Paula Hamilton) is the sister of Liam O'Hagan (Ciarán Hinds), the Provisional IRA man charged with the murder. The intelligence service tries to stop Hollins from attending the trial, and then all charges against O'Hagan are dropped without explanation. Hollins investigates the murder of his son.

== Cast ==
- John Thaw as Geoff Hollins
- Christopher Fulford as David Hollins
- Ciarán Hinds as Liam O'Hagan
- George Baker as Colonel
- Nicholas Le Prevost as Mardon
- Sheila Ruskin as Sue Friday
- Paula Hamilton as Siobhan
- Michael Harte as Young David
- David Coyle as Jimmy
- John Hewitt as Frank
- Anthony Milner as Tommy Gillespie
- Niall Cusack as UDR Soldier
- Michael Duffy as Taxi Driver
- George Mooney as Policeman in Court
- George Shane as Black Taxi Driver
- Doreen Hepburn as Woman in Taxi
- Maureen Dow as Woman in Taxi
- Jesse Birdsall as Soldier
- Ann Hasson as Mary
- Colette O'Neil as Jean Hollins
- Birdy Sweeney as Barman
- Derek Lord as Large Man in Bar
- Ursula Smith as Mrs Hunter
- Brenda Winter as Woman at Farm
- Olivia Nash as Woman at Farm
- B.J. Hogg as Man at Farm
- Michael Gormley as Man at Farm
- Oliver Maguire as Norman
- David Hitchinson as Television Announcer
- Lynda Jayne Caithness as Radio Presenter

== Reception ==
The Listener gave the film an enthusiastic review and commented that it was "set in that last remnant of Empire, Northern Ireland".
