= Monk Dawson (novel) =

1969 novel by Piers Paul Read

- First edition (UK)
- Author: Piers Paul Read
- Language: English
- Publisher: Secker & Warburg (UK); Lippincott (US)
- Publication date: 1969
- Publication place: United Kingdom
- Media type: Print
- Pages: 219
- ISBN: 0-436-40971-2

Monk Dawson, is a novel by English author Piers Paul Read, published in 1969 by Secker and Warburg in the UK and in 1970 by Lippincott in the US, the year it won both the Somerset Maugham Award and Hawthornden Prize. It was adapted into a film of the same name in 1998. The first part of the book was based on the author's experiences of Ampleforth College, and in an interview with The Catholic Herald the author reveals that the book was banned from the boarding school.

== Reception ==
- "A remarkable novel...profoundly moving" - Graham Greene
- "A Voltairean journey through contemporary panaceas" - The Sunday Telegraph
- "A fine and assured achievement" - New York Times

== Plot introduction ==
It tells the story of Edward Dawson through the words of his friend Robert Winterman. It begins with their school days at Kirkham, a Roman Catholic boarding school run by Benedictine monks. Edward vows to devote his life to helping people and comes to believe that entering the priesthood to be the best way to fulfil this ambition and stays on at Kirkham, becoming Father John. The Second Vatican Council called by Pope John XXIII has considerable impact on Dawson, who was caught up in reformist zeal; which led to his leaving the monastery and moving into the secular clergy. He works at Westminster Cathedral but finds his faith challenged by the pressures of the world around him and he eventually loses his faith and gives up his vocation. Instead with the help of his friend Robert becomes a journalist, editing the Beaconsfield Gazette, and having left the Church finds himself without friends. But the enigmatic ex-monk finds solace in recently widowed Jenny, one of the women he helped as a priest, and moves in with her...
