= Paula Hamilton =

English model

- Born: 2 January 1961 (age 65); Lancashire, England
- Occupation: Model
- Modelling information
- Height: 1.74 m (5 ft 9 in)
- Hair colour: Brunette
- Eye colour: Hazel
- Website: paulahamilton.co.uk

Paula Hamilton (born 2 January 1961) is an English model. She is best known for her appearance in the 1987 Mk II Volkswagen Golf TV advert Changes. In 2006, she returned to public recognition as a judge on Britain's Next Top Model, for two cycles.

== Early life ==
Hamilton's father died in Liverpool before her birth, after which her mother moved to South Africa, where her mother and stepfather brought her up.

The family moved to Hertfordshire when she was eight years old. Hamilton has five half-siblings. Aged 11, she learned that her real father was not Thomas "Ian Gunner" Hamilton, but a family friend, John Johnson.

Hamilton is dyslexic and did not learn to read and write until she was 11. For several years, she attended Burnham Secondary Modern School near Slough under the name of Paula Sherrin. She later attended the Licensed Victuallers' School, which was then in Slough, along with Nicholas and Simon Cowell, who were both at the school for one year.

== Career ==
At the age of 18, after appearing in pornographic poses and after several rejections as a model, Hamilton moved to Tokyo, Japan, and worked for 18 months. She then established herself in Australia and Germany before moving to Italy.

Returning to England, Hamilton was discovered by the photographer David Bailey, and as a result, became the main model of the Queen's couturier Sir Hardy Amies. During a tough interview with top Italian photographer Fabrizio Ferrei, Hamilton was told her hair was too long for the job. She promptly cut her hair, got the job, and went on to learn the tricks of the trade at Ferrei's side.

Hamilton reached the zenith of her modelling career at the age of 27 when she appeared in an iconic 1987 television advert for the Volkswagen Golf. Changes starred Hamilton, made up to resemble Diana, Princess of Wales. She is seen leaving her husband, posting her wedding ring back through the letterbox, throwing her pearl necklace and brooch towards a cat, and ditching her fur coat – but keeping the car keys. "If only everything in life was as reliable as a Volkswagen" ran the tagline. The advert began a new era in car advertising.

She went into rehab in her twenties, having become addicted to cocaine after being introduced to the drug by her agent. She was clean of drugs for seven years before becoming an alcoholic.

In the early 1990s, Hamilton participated in a television programme Back to the Present hosted by Eamonn Holmes and Esther McVey, where celebrities are regressed to 'uncover' their past lives. Hamilton, while being regressed, revealed that in a former life, she had been a male servant named Ashley Brown who emigrated from London to Dublin.

Hamilton also acted, appearing in feature films such as Mad Dogs and Englishmen (1995) and Monk Dawson (1998). In 1996, she featured in the music video accompanying the British boyband Take That's single "How Deep Is Your Love". The single reached number one on the UK Singles Chart. In the same year, she also published her autobiography, "Instructions Not Included".

In 2000, after the death of her friend Paula Yates from a drugs overdose, she left the UK and emigrated to New Zealand's south island, and started studying business at Christchurch Polytechnic. Having checked herself into Christchurch-based alcohol treatment clinic The Deanery, she later ended up as a media celebrity after leading a campaign to close the clinic down after it revealed private details of her admission and treatment. After her second arrest and conviction for drink driving, she returned to the UK after five years.

In 2006, it was announced that Hamilton, at the age of 45, had been re-signed by the leading agency Models 1, who hoped to capitalise on the popularity of more mature models, led by Twiggy and her successful advertising campaign for Marks & Spencer. Also in 2006 she was a mentor and judge on the second and third series of Britain's Next Top Model on Living TV, presented by model Lisa Snowdon.

Hamilton received therapy in 2006 and was diagnosed with bipolar disorder. It was revealed in 2007 that she had a combination of dyslexia, developmental coordination disorder, and Asperger syndrome.

In May 2011, Hamilton starred in the second series of Channel 4's Celebrity Five Go to... in which the guest stars visited South Africa. In 2012, she was convicted for drunk driving again after crashing her car into her neighbour's conservatory in Farnham Common, Buckinghamshire, and lost her driving licence.

On 3 January 2013, Hamilton was revealed as a contestant on Celebrity Big Brother 11, becoming the third celebrity to enter the house on that night, and was sent straight to the basement. On Day 7, she became the first celebrity to be evicted from the Big Brother house, losing to Heidi & Spencer, and Frankie Dettori.

In February 2013, Hamilton was found guilty of assaulting a police officer with a sunflower and was fined £400.

Hamilton is now signed to the London-based Mandpmodels.

== Personal life ==
Hamilton has reported losing her virginity to Simon Cowell, then a boy attending the same school, when she was sixteen. After naked pictures of her had appeared in Mayfair, she moved to London and for two years lived with a boyfriend, Andrew, and his parents in Rutland Gate, South Kensington.

In September 1986, Hamilton met Dan Mindel, a camera focus puller, and they married in London the following year. They stayed together until 1989, when they began a lengthy divorce process.

In the 1990s, Hamilton met Michael Ashcroft at the Savoy, when he offered her £200 for her charity Tusk Force if she would dance with him, and they went on to have a long affair.

== Filmography ==
Year	Title	Role	Notes
1985	We'll Support You Evermore	Siobhan O'Hagan	TV movie
1987	Empire of the Sun	British Prisoner #5	
1995	Mad Dogs and Englishmen	Charlie	
1998	Monk Dawson	Jenny Stanten	
1998	Titanic Town	Mrs. Brennan	
2000	The Low Down	Cashpoint Woman	
