= The Rangoon Times =

The Rangoon Times was an English-language weekly newspaper published in Rangoon, Burma during British rule. It was published from 1854 until British expulsion of Rangoon in 1942. The newspaper was formerly named the Rangoon Chronicle, and was renamed to The Rangoon Times in 1858. In the Homeward Mail of 23 January 1909, the death of the then sole proprietor Mr Oswald Maurice O'Brien was announced. It was managed by George A. Brown, a Scotsman, from about 1915 to his death in 1940. The Scottish author, critic and journalist Richard Curle took up the editorship in 1920.

== Publishing frequency ==
The newspaper was initially published twice a week, before being increased to three times by 1861, later becoming a daily publication.
