= Nate Lanxon =

British journalist (born 1984)

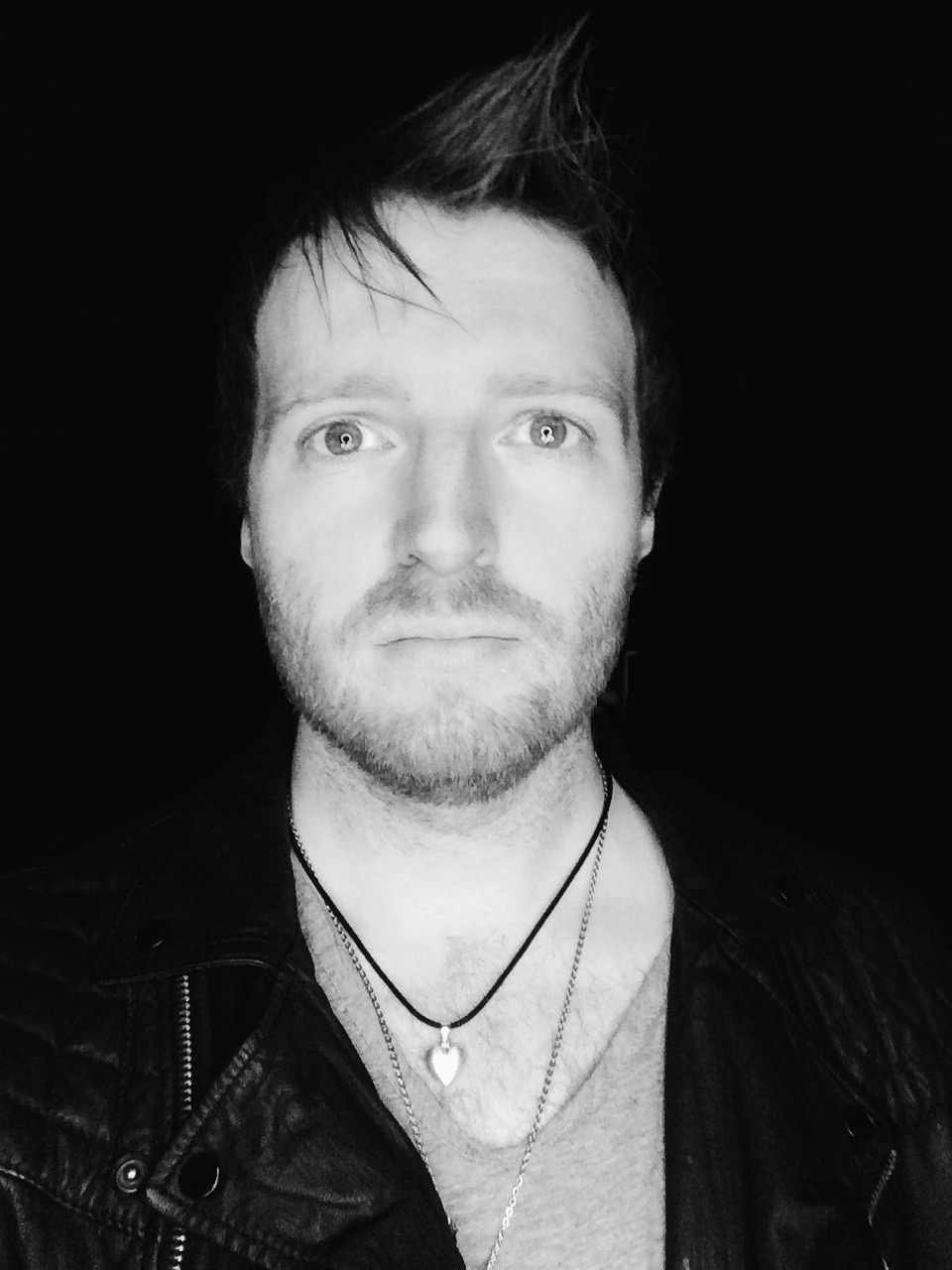
- Born: William Charles Lanxon Fisher; 15 December 1984 (age 41); Sheffield, England
- Occupation: Journalist

Nate William Charles Lanxon (born 15 December 1984) is a British technology journalist, TV presenter and podcaster. He lives in London, England. Lanxon is an editor at Bloomberg News, having formerly been editor of Wired.co.uk at Condé Nast, the online arm of Wired Magazine. Previously, he was a Senior Editor at CNET.

In October 2014 it was announced Conde Nast would launch a British version of Ars Technica, led by Lanxon as editor-in-chief, with a London-based team working under him to produce local editorial content. Ken Fisher, founder and editor-in-chief of Ars Technica in the United States, would oversee the publication from a brand perspective. Lanxon ended up accepting a position at Bloomberg prior to Ars UK launching.

== Background ==
Lanxon has written for or spoken on media outlets including Ars Technica, BBC television and radio, Channel 4, CNN, The Sunday Times, The Metro, Sky News and Wired magazine.

He appeared as an expert judge on one episode of the 2011 series of the BBC's programme The Apprentice.

Lanxon was shortlisted for the British Society of Magazine Editors' award for Editor Of The Year in 2010, 2011, and again in 2013.

== AI IRL ==
In February 2023 Bloomberg announced Lanxon would host a new TV and streaming series called AI IRL with fellow journalist Jackie Davalos, as part of a new Bloomberg Originals brand. The series was scheduled to begin airing on Bloomberg Television in April. The first episode broadcast on April 20, 2023 and run for 12 episodes in its first season.

== Podcasting ==
Lanxon currently co-hosts the technology podcast Tech's Message with fellow journalist Ian Morris. In 2017, the show was shortlisted for the Webby Award for 'Best Technology Podcast'.

From 2010 to 2014, Lanxon was the host and producer of Wired UK's weekly technology podcast, during which time the show reached number one in the UK iTunes Podcast charts.

Previously, Lanxon was the host of CNET's weekly technology podcast in the UK. His younger brother, Andrew Lanxon, went on to host this show in his capacity as senior editor at CNET.
