= George Brown (rower) =

Canadian rower

George Brown (February 7, 1839 at Herring Cove, Nova Scotia, British North America – July 8, 1875) was a champion single sculler and for five years in a row won the $150 Belt offered by the Royal Nova Scotia Yacht Squadron. He was regarded as one of the greatest long distance scullers in the world. He was the winner of the Cogswell Belt race from 1864 to 1868. He died on July 8, 1875, and is buried in St. John's Cemetery, Halifax, where there is a plaque in recognition of his rowing accomplishments.
