= Piers Paul Read =

British novelist, historian and biographer

Piers Paul Read FRSL
- Born: 7 March 1941 (age 85); Beaconsfield, Buckinghamshire, England
- Education: University of Cambridge
- Occupations: Novelist; historian; biographer

Piers Paul Read FRSL (born 7 March 1941) is a British novelist, historian and biographer. He was first noted in 1974 for a book of reportage, Alive: The Story of the Andes Survivors, later adapted as a feature film and a documentary. Read was educated at St. John's College, Cambridge, where he studied history.

Among his most popular works are the novels The Professor's Daughter, A Married Man, and A Season in the West. In addition to his written works, Read is also a dramatist and television scriptwriter. In recent years, he has produced a number of authorized biographies and popular history books which are intended for a general audience. Read has worked and lived in both the United Kingdom and the United States, where he published many of his recent works. Read was awarded the Sir Geoffrey Faber Memorial Prize for The Junkers, the Hawthornden Prize and Somerset Maugham Award for Monk Dawson, the Thomas More Medal for Alive, and the Enid McLeod Award for The Free Frenchman.

== Background ==
Piers Paul Read was born in Beaconsfield, Buckinghamshire. He is the third son of Sir Herbert Read, a poet, art critic and theorist of anarchism, and Margaret Read (née Ludwig), a professional musician. His mother was a convert to Roman Catholicism and he was raised in that religion.

When Read was eight, his family moved to North Yorkshire. He was educated by Benedictine monks at Gilling Castle and Ampleforth College. His years at Ampleforth would later provide much of the material for the first part of his third novel Monk Dawson (1969) and rural Ryedale was the setting of his fifth novel, The Upstart (1973). In 1959 he went to St John's College, Cambridge, where he studied history. He received his B.A. in 1961 and M.A. in 1962. In 1963–64, he spent a year in West Berlin on a Ford Foundation Fellowship. There he came into contact with German writers in the Gruppe 47, the French nouveau romancier Michel Butor, and the Polish novelist, diarist and playwright, Witold Gombrowicz, and worked on his first novel Game in Heaven with Tussy Marx (1966). He later enrolled in an academy for writers funded by the Ford Foundation, the Literarisches Colloquium, where he made friends with fellow members Tom Stoppard and Derek Marlowe.

His stay in Berlin inspired his second novel The Junkers (1968, which won the Geoffrey Faber Memorial Prize) and confirmed the general sympathy towards the Germans that he felt on account of his mother's part-German ancestry. On returning to England, he took a job as sub-editor on The Times Literary Supplement and shared a flat in Pimlico with Stoppard and Marlowe. In 1967–68, he spent a year in New York – an experience he used in his fourth novel The Professor's Daughter (1971).

== Personal life ==
Read is a practising Catholic and has served on the board of Catholic charities such as Aid to the Church in Need (UK) and the National Catholic Library. He was Master and remains Vice-President of the Catholic Writers' Guild of England and Wales. He has served on the governing bodies of the Institute of Contemporary Arts (1971–1975), the Society of Authors (1973–1976) and the Royal Society of Literature (2001–2007).

In 1967, he married Emily Albertine, daughter of (Evelyn) Basil Boothby, CMG, British Ambassador to Iceland from 1962 to 1965, and descended from Sir William Boothby, 7th Baronet; her mother, Susan, was granddaughter of British Prime Minister H. H. Asquith. They live in London, and have two sons, including Albert Read, and two daughters. Read was romantically involved with a 15-year-old Anna Wintour when he was 24.

In 2005, he correctly predicted the election of Joseph Ratzinger as Pope Benedict XVI. In Read's 1988 WWII novel The Free Frenchman, the protagonist's Catholic faith plays an important part in political decisions and dilemmas during the German occupation of France, as well as in the protagonist's tangled relations with the women in his life.

== Work ==
Early in his career, Read wrote a number of scripts for film and television – A Premeditated Crime (1967) for the German director Peter Lilienthal whom he met in Berlin; Coincidence (1968), The House on Highbury Hill (1971) and The Childhood Friend (1974) as Wednesday Plays for BBC television – the latter starring Anthony Hopkins who would also play the title role in the television adaptation of Read's A Married Man (1984). A short play The Class War was staged by the Questors Theatre Company in 1964, and his Margaret Clitherow was broadcast by Granada Television in 1977.

The greater part of Read's work has been in prose form. After his plotless first novel, Game in Heaven with Tussy Marx (1967), Read's fiction adopted a more traditional narrative structure with both contemporary and historical settings. Three of his historical novels – The Junkers (1968), Polonaise (1976), The Free Frenchman (1986), are set in Continental Europe around World War II; and Alice in Exile (2001) in Russia at the time of the Bolshevik Revolution. Read's contemporaneous novels – A Married Man (1979), A Season in the West (1988), and The Misogynist (2010) – are ironic critiques of the manners and morals of the English upper-middle classes.

There are elements of the thriller in The Villa Golitsyn (1981), On the Third Day (1990), A Patriot in Berlin (1995), Knights of the Cross (1997) and The Death of a Pope (2009), though these too show Read's historical, political and religious concerns. With Alive: The Story of the Andes Survivors (1974), The Train Robbers (1978), and Ablaze: The Story of Chernobyl (1993) Read extended his range to reportage; to history with The Templars (1999) and The Dreyfus Affair (2012); and to biography with Alec Guinness: The Authorised Biography (2003). He has also contributed to moral and religious controversies with a pamphlet Quo Vadis: The Subversion of the Catholic Church (1991), and essays and articles collected in Hell and Other Destinations (2006).

Read was awarded the Sir Geoffrey Faber Memorial Prize for The Junkers; the Hawthornden Prize and Somerset Maugham Award for Monk Dawson; the Thomas More Medal for Alive; the Enid McLeod Award for The Free Frenchman; and the James Tait Black Memorial Prize for A Season in the West. Read's novels A Married Man (1984) and The Free Frenchman (1988) were adapted for television; Alive was made into a feature film by the director Frank Marshal in 1993; and Monk Dawson by Tom Waller in 1998.

=== Alive ===
Read is best known for his non-fiction book Alive: The Story of the Andes Survivors which documented the story of the 1972 crash of Uruguayan Air Force Flight 571 in the Andes Mountains. Alive won the Thomas More Medal for the most distinguished contribution to Catholic literature in 1974 and has sold more than five million copies worldwide. The book was adapted into the 1993 film Alive: The Miracle of the Andes. Beyond Society (Más allá de la sociedad) is an upcoming 2026 documentary series, that will be released on Netflix December 18, 2026. It will include interviews with the authors Piers Paul Read and Pablo Vierci and the filmmakers Frank Marshall and J. A. Bayona.

=== Other work ===
Read's first notable success was his novel Monk Dawson (1969), which won him a Hawthornden Prize and a Somerset Maugham Award, and was later made into the 1998 film of the same name by Tom Waller.

In 1978 he wrote the book The Train Robbers about the Great Train Robbery in England in 1963. In 1988 he was awarded a James Tait Black Memorial Prize for his book A Season in the West. In 2003 his authorised biography of the actor Alec Guinness was published.

In 2009 he wrote The Death of a Pope (ISBN 9781586172954) set with the 2005 Papal conclave as a backdrop. In 2015 he wrote Scarpia (ISBN 9781408867501), a fictional retelling of the story in the Puccini opera Tosca.

In 2023 he wrote A History of the Catholic Church, covering the church's history from its Jewish roots to the papacy of Pope Benedict XVI.

=== Archive ===
Read's archive of literary papers and correspondence is held by Special Collections in the Brotherton Library at the University of Leeds. The collection consists of 139 boxes and contains manuscripts and typescripts of his novels and plays. It also contains articles and short stories; extensive correspondence, interview tapes and research notes; press-cuttings and other papers.

=== Themes ===
Read's novels are strongly influenced by his Catholic faith. His stories focus on the religious themes of sin and redemption. Read writes in a fairly traditional, linear style and he often uses plot elements from popular fiction, especially the thriller, like espionage, murder and conspiracy theories. Most of his main characters are fairly unsympathetic and some of them commit horrific deeds before they finally convert to God.

Almost all of Read's novels are set in Europe. Many of his books show a great interest and sympathy especially for Germany – quite unusual in British literature – and for Eastern European countries like Russia and Poland. In The Knights of the Cross, he explicitly satirises the expectations and prejudices of the British readership towards the Germans.

== List of works ==
=== Fiction ===
- Game in Heaven with Tussy Marx (1966)
- The Junkers (1968)
- Monk Dawson (1969)
- The Professor's Daughter (1971)
- The Upstart (1973)
- Polonaise (1976)
- A Married Man (1979)
- The Villa Golitsyn (1981)
- The Free Frenchman (1986)
- A Season in the West (1988)
- On the Third Day (1990)
- A Patriot in Berlin (1995)
- Knights of the Cross (1997)
- Alice in Exile (2001)
- The Death of a Pope (2009)
- The Misogynist (2010)
- Scarpia (2015)

=== Non-fiction ===
- Alive: The Story of the Andes Survivors (1974)
- The Train Robbers (1978)
- Quo Vadis? The Subversion of the Catholic Church (a 45-page pamphlet in the Claridge "Blasts" series) (1991)
- Ablaze: The Story of Chernobyl (1993)
- The Templars: The Dramatic History of the Knights Templar, the Most Powerful Military Order of the Crusades (1999)
- Alec Guinness. The Authorised Biography (2003)
- Hell and Other Destinations (US title: Hell and Other Essays) (2006)
- The Dreyfus Affair: The Story of the Most Infamous Miscarriage of Justice in French History (2012)
- A History of the Catholic Church (2023)
