= George McLaren Brown =

Canadian railway administrator (1865–1939)

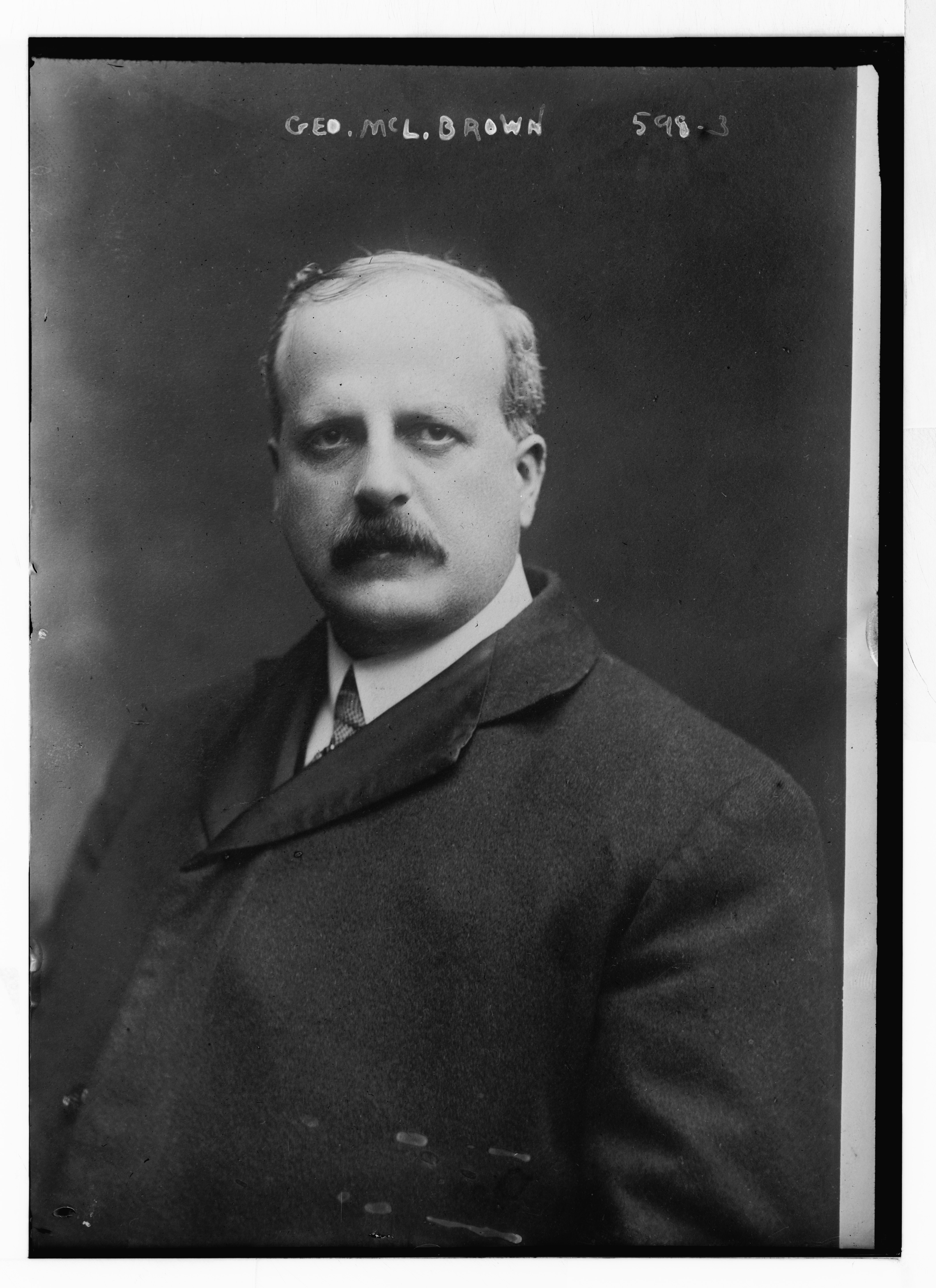
George McLaren Brown

Sir George McLaren Brown, KBE (29 January 1865 – 28 June 1939) was a Canadian railway administrator. He worked for Canadian Pacific Railway from 1887 to 1936, eventually becoming its European general manager.

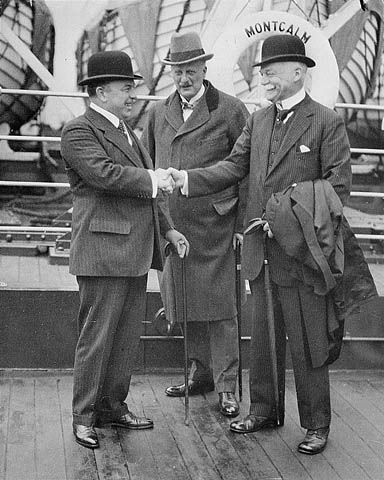
Brown (centre) with Prime Minister of Canada William Lyon Mackenzie King (left) and High Commissioner to Great Britain Peter Charles Larkin (right) en route to the 1926 Imperial Conference

During the First World War, Brown was Assistant Director-General of Movements and Railways at the War Office. For his service, in 1919 he was appointed a Knight Commander of the Order of the British Empire "For valuable services rendered in connection with the War".
