= George Brown (rugby league, Castleford) =

English rugby league footballer

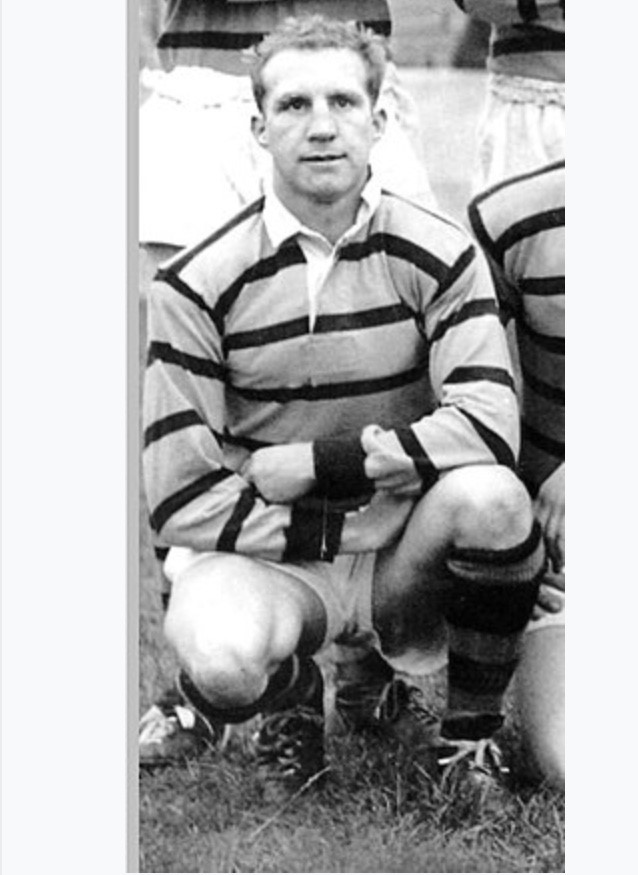

Playing information
Club
Years	Team	Pld	T	G	FG	P
1958–63	Castleford	101	29	0	0	87

George Brown is a former professional rugby league footballer who played in the 1950s and 1960s. He played at club level for Castleford.
