= Changes (advertisement) =

1987 British television advertisement

- Hamilton angrily tears off her pearl necklace
- Agency: Boase Massimi Pollitt
- Client: Volkswagen
- Language: English
- Running time: 50 seconds
- Product: Volkswagen Golf Mk2
- Release date: 1987 (television)
- Slogan: "If only everything in life was as reliable as a Volkswagen."
- Directed by: David Bailey
- Music by: Alan Price
- Starring: Paula Hamilton
- Production company: Paul Weiland Film Co Ltd.
- Produced by: Howard Spivey
- Country: United Kingdom
- Official website: www.volkswagen.com

Changes is a British television advertisement launched in 1987 to promote the second-generation of the Volkswagen Golf. The 50-second ad was directed by David Bailey and stars the model Paula Hamilton as a woman throwing away some of her possessions. After discarding her wedding ring, pearl necklace, brooch and mink coat, she decides to keep her Volkswagen Golf and drives off in it with a smile on her face. Changes was named after the song that was used as its soundtrack, written by Alan Price. It was awarded the Silver prize at the 1988 British Arrows Awards, and is remembered as an indicator of car advertising's recognition of women's growing independence.

== Sequence ==
A woman (Paula Hamilton) is leaving her husband. She tearfully exits her mews house, removes her wedding ring and posts it back through the letter box. Walking away, she angrily tears off her pearl necklace, throws away her brooch, and removes her mink coat. She approaches a drain, but, as she goes to drop the keys to her Volkswagen Golf down it, she changes her mind and decides instead to keep the car. The advert ends with her driving off in the Golf with a smile on her face; its strapline reads: "If only everything in life was as reliable as a Volkswagen."

== Production ==
Changes was created by the advertising agency DDB on behalf of Volkswagen. It was written by creative team Barry Greensted and Graham Featherstone, directed by the British photographer David Bailey, who had first discovered Hamilton. For the piece, Hamilton was styled to resemble Princess Diana. The music used was the song "Changes" by Alan Price, which also gave its title to the advert itself. Set to the tune of "What a Friend We Have in Jesus", the song was written for the 1973 Lindsay Anderson film O Lucky Man!.

== Reception ==
Critical reaction to the advert was positive—it was awarded the Silver prize at the 1988 British Arrows Awards. As a result of the success of Changes, Hamilton was catapulted to fame, but grew to resent only being known for it. Speaking to Matthew Wright in 1997, she remarked: "All I always seem to be known as is Paula Hamilton the alcoholic and Volkswagen girl."

Year	Award	Result	Ref.
1988	British Arrows Awards	Silver	

== Legacy ==
Changes is remembered as an indicator of car advertising beginning to recognise women's increased independence – previous car adverts had largely only either featured women as models or depicted them as passengers. Reflecting on the advert in May 1998, Stephen Armstrong of The Guardian named it as one of the five best advertising campaigns, and remarked that it had "spawned a new era in car advertising". In April 2000 Changes was ranked at number 42 on Channel 4's The 100 Greatest TV Ads, where it was described as being "a sign that feminism had at last reached the ad men".
