= George Brown (Australian footballer) =

Australian rules footballer (born 1959)

Personal information
- Full name: George Brown
- Born: 14 July 1959 (age 67)
- Original team: Marysville
- Height: 180 cm (5 ft 11 in)
- Weight: 76 kg (168 lb)

Playing career^{1}
Years	Club	Games (Goals)
1978–79	Footscray	7 (4)
- ^{1} Playing statistics correct to the end of 1979.

George Brown (born 14 July 1959) is a former Australian rules footballer who played with Footscray in the Victorian Football League (VFL).
