= George Brown Darwin Botanic Gardens =

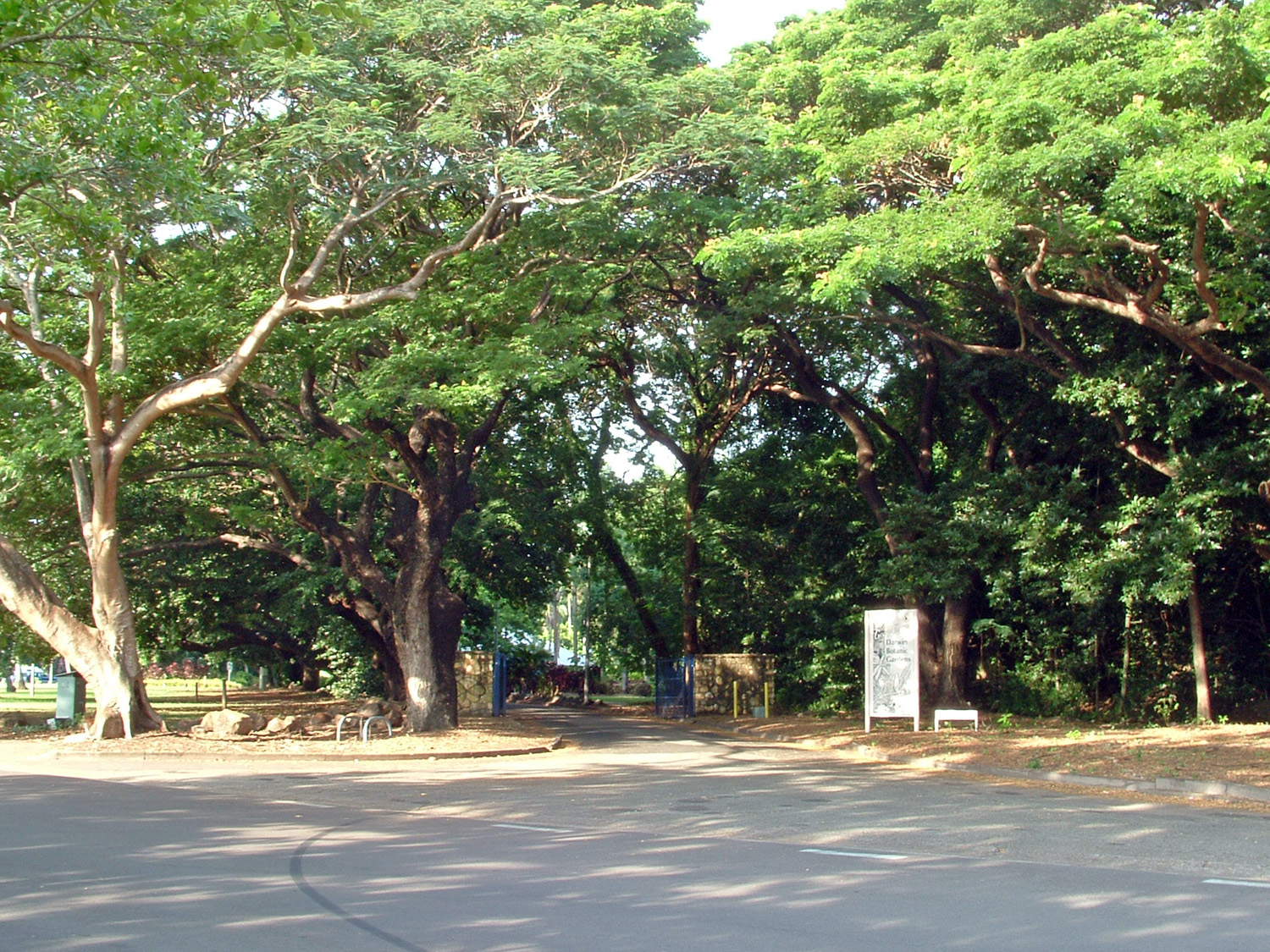
- Entrance into George Brown Darwin Botanic Gardens
- Interactive map of George Brown Darwin Botanic Gardens
- Type: Botanical
- Location: The Gardens, Darwin, Northern Territory
- Coordinates: 12°26′42″S 130°50′11″E
- Opened: 1886
- Owner: Parks and Wildlife Commission of the Northern Territory
- Operator: Parks and Wildlife Commission of the Northern Territory
- Website: Official website

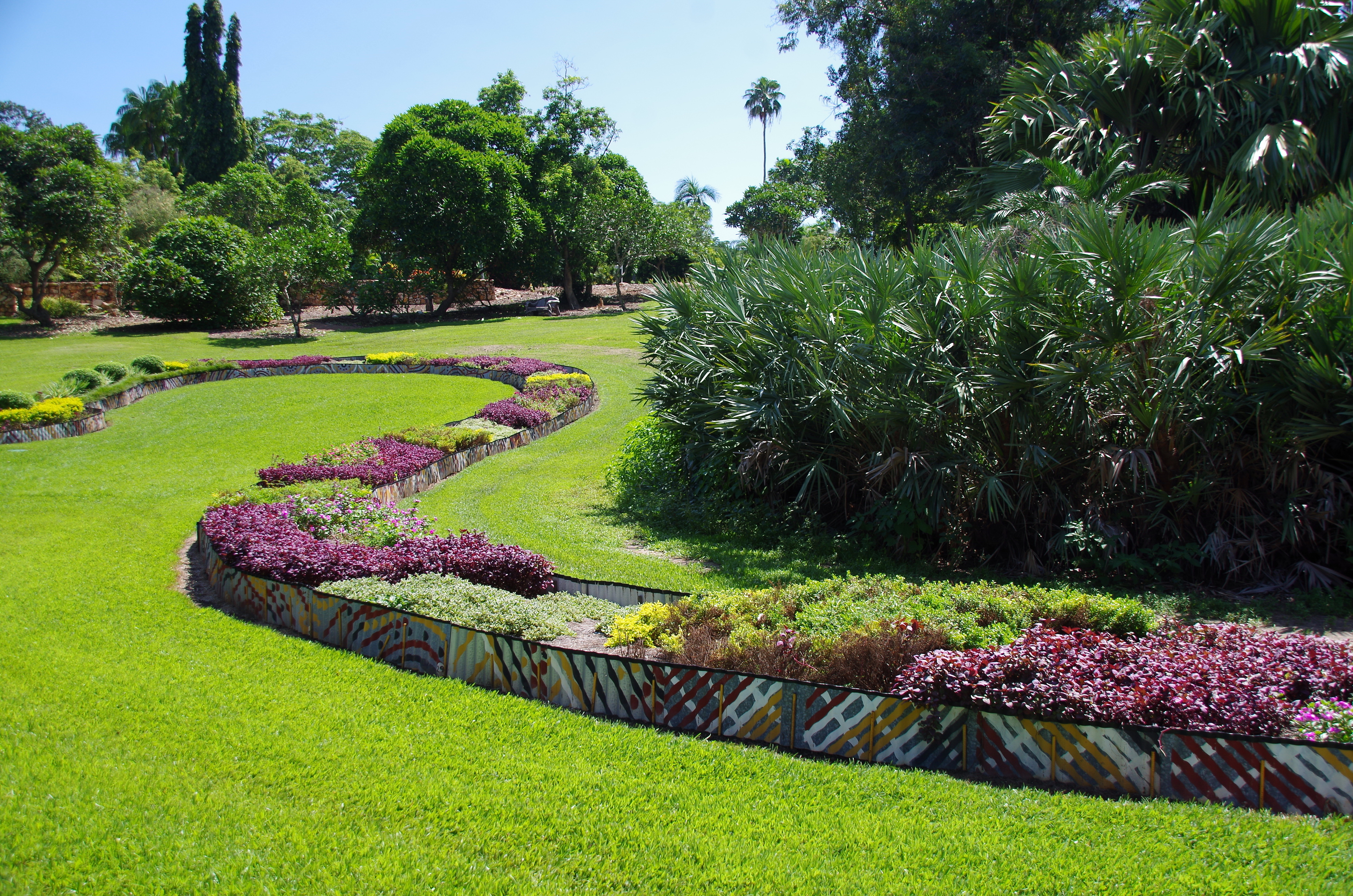
Frangipani Hill

The George Brown Darwin Botanic Gardens is a botanical garden located 2 km north of the CBD of Darwin, Northern Territory, Australia.

== History ==
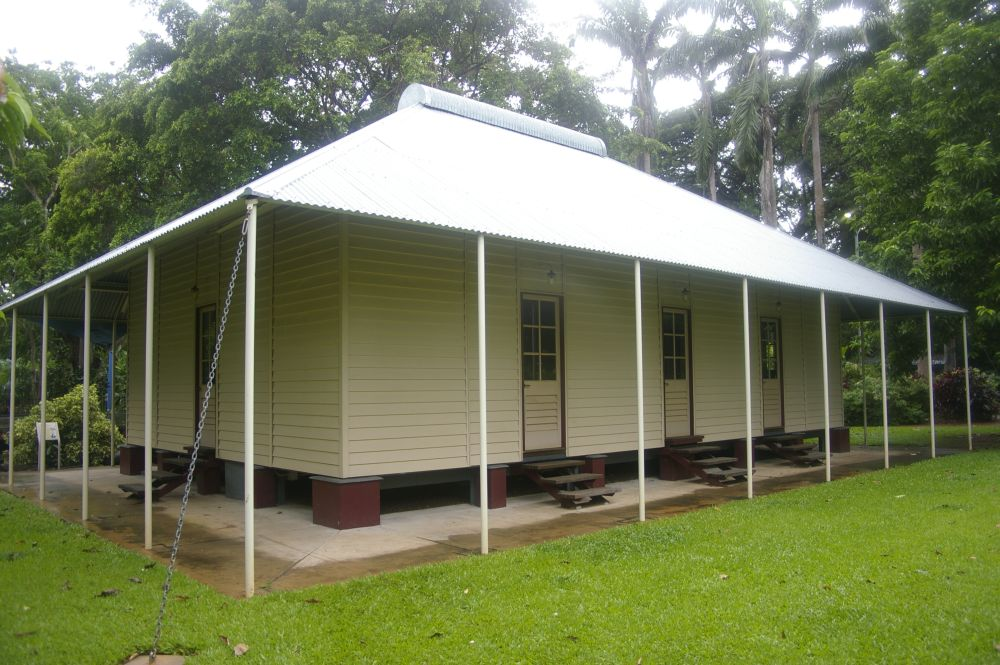
Oldest surviving building in Darwin

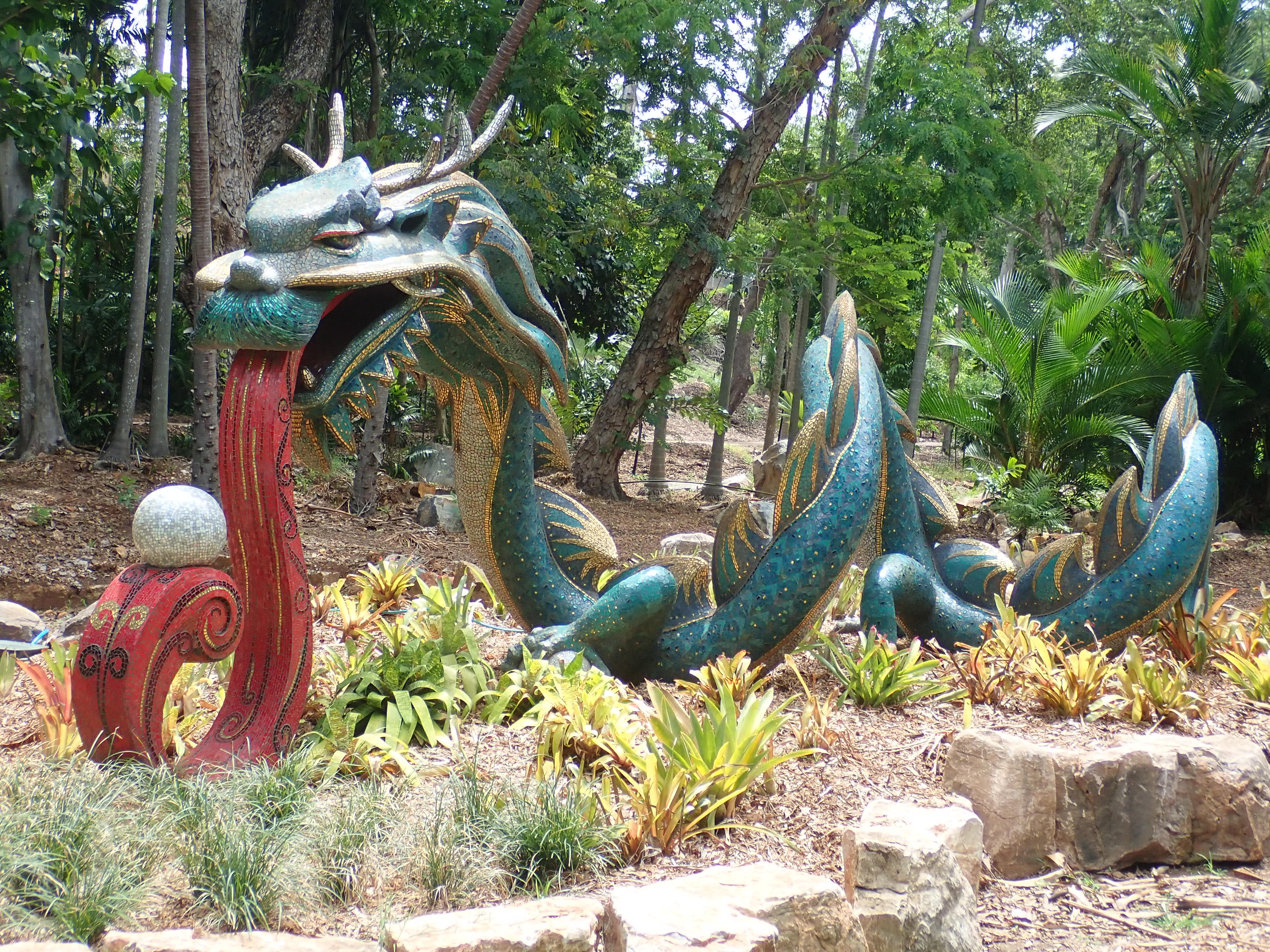
Dragon (artist:Techy Masero)

The gardens were established on their present site in 1886 The gardens were severely damaged during Cyclone Tracy in 1974. Restoration after the cyclone was led by George Brown. The gardens were renamed in 2002 after him.

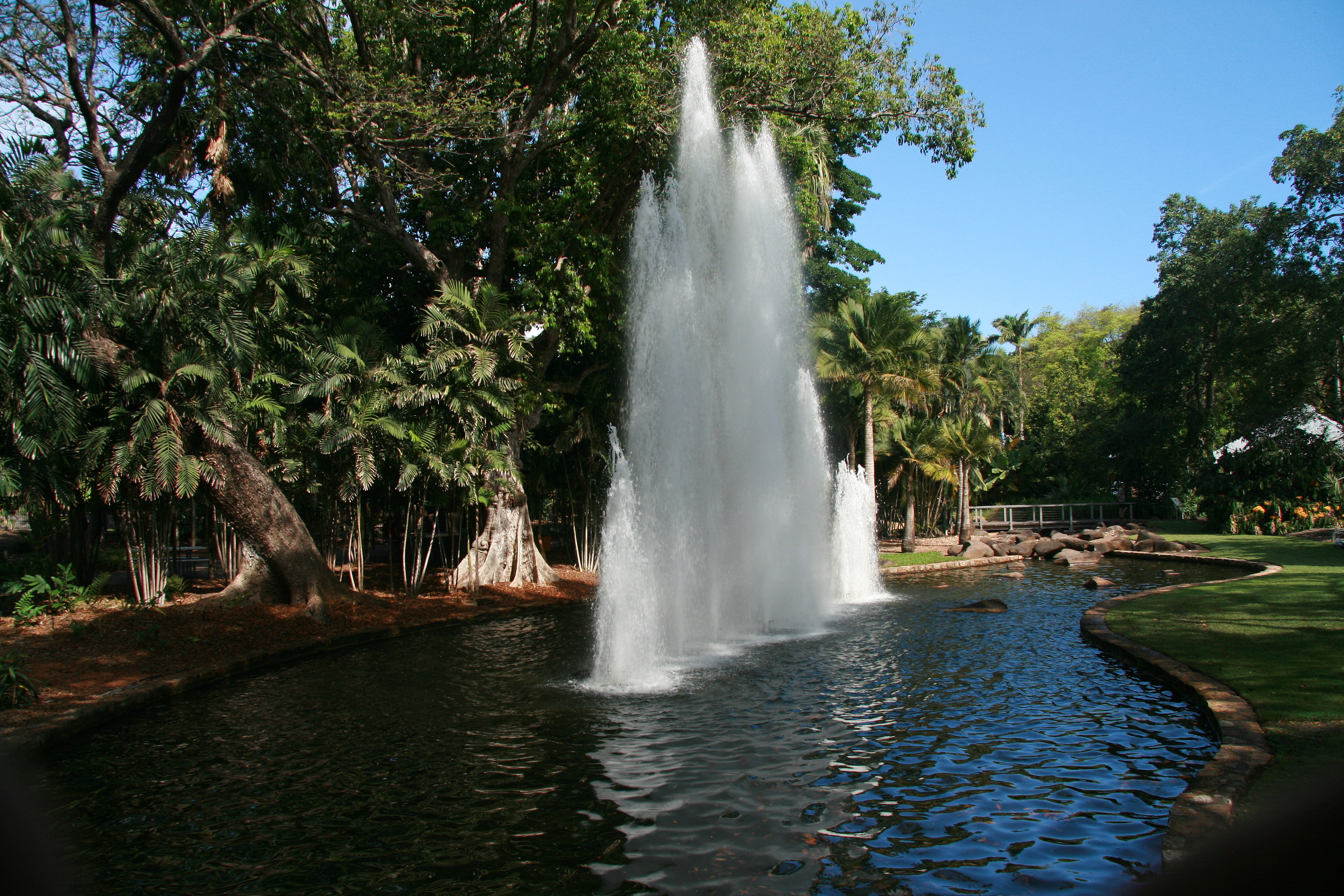
Fountain

Today, the old church building houses Eva's Botanical Gardens Cafe.

== Collections ==
The gardens contain a major collection of Northern Australian monsoon flora; these include communities like mangroves, monsoon vine thicket, Tiwi Islands wet forest and those found on the Arnhem Land escarpment. The gardens also has a large collection of native and introduced tropical plants including cycads, palms, Adansonia, gingers and heliconias.

== Access and transport ==
George Brown Darwin Botanic Gardens is accessible by a number of entrances. The main entrance and visitor parking is located at Gardens Rd. A secondary entrance with parking is situated at the end of Geranium street which is a turn-off from Stuart Highway. Pedestrians and cyclists can also access from Gilruth Avenue.

Public transport is available by bus number 10 which stops close to the Geranium Street entrance as well as bus number 4 which has a stop close to the Gardens Road entrance.

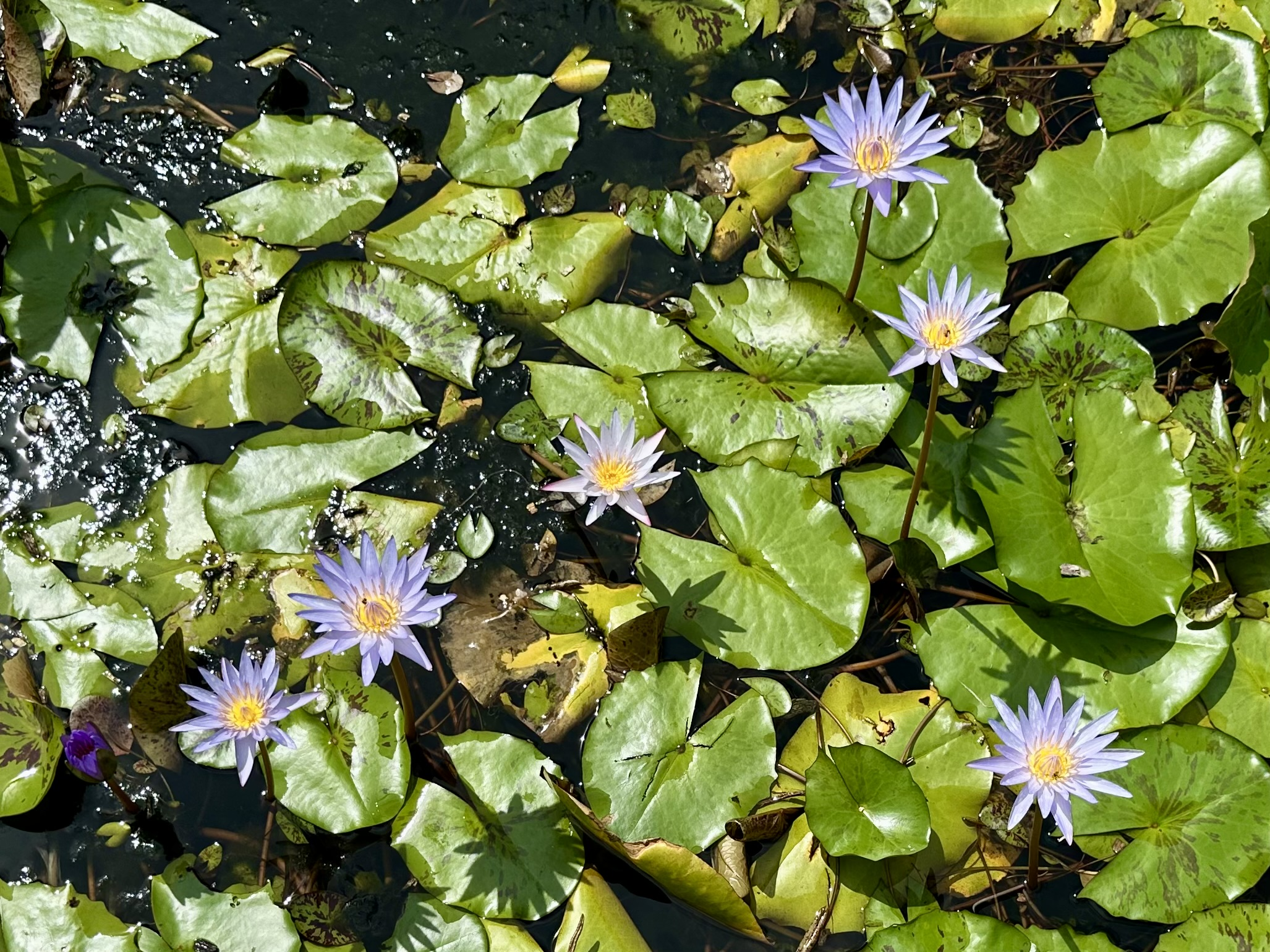
Blue Water Lily Pond - George Brown Darwin Botanic Gardens
