= George A. Brown =

Scottish businessman

George A. Brown (1885–1940) was a Scottish businessman, and manager of the Rangoon Times from 1915 up until his death in 1940. He was also a prominent freemason. He attended Glasgow High School and was apprenticed as an accountant in Glasgow before being appointed to an accounting firm in Yangon (Rangoon) in 1906. He worked there, and later with a tin-mining company in the region, before becoming the manager of the Rangoon Times in 1915. He died in 1940 in Yangon under unknown circumstances.
