= Albert Read (executive) =

British journalist and media executive

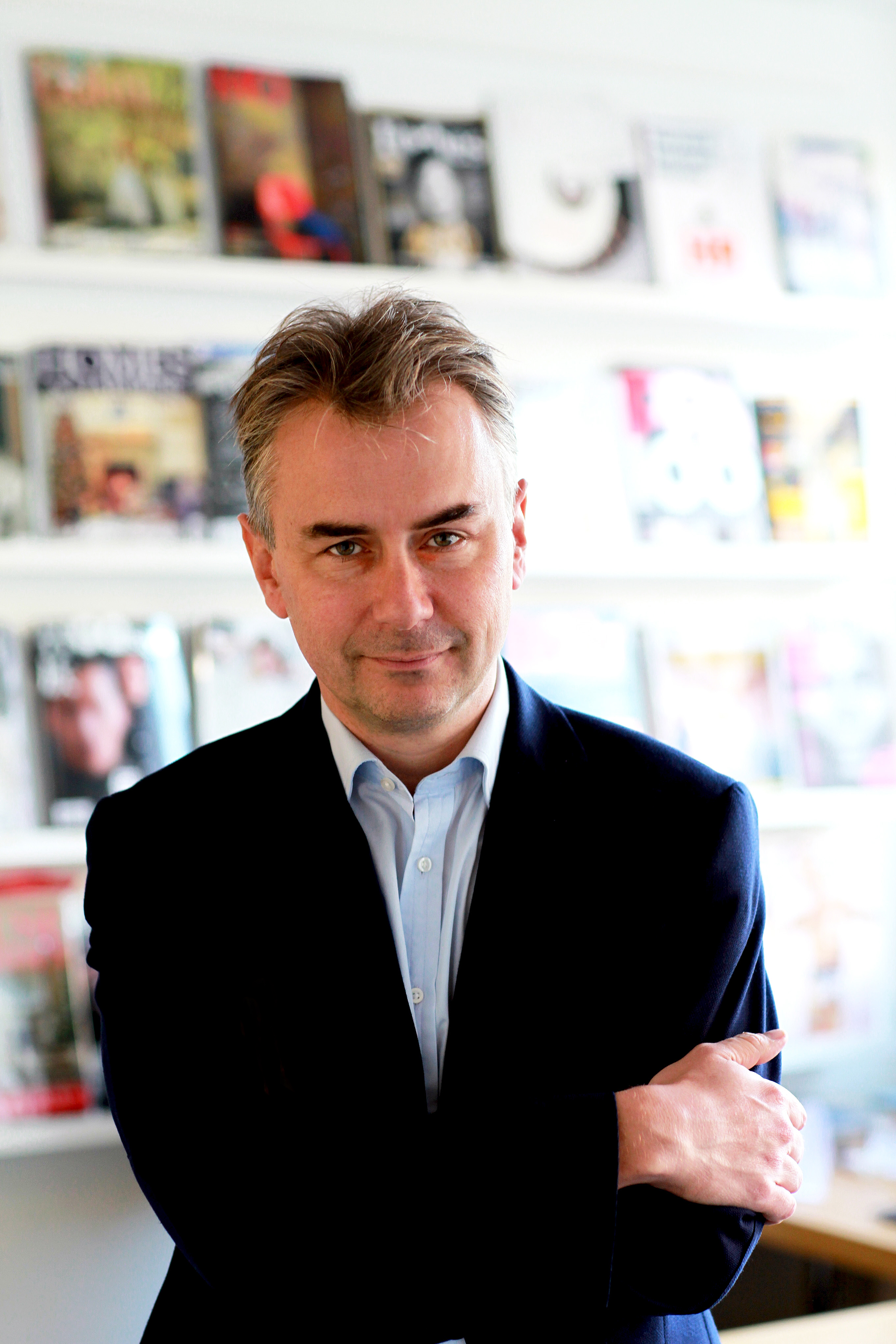
- Born: London, England
- Education: University of Oxford; INSEAD
- Occupation: Executive Chairman of The Evening Standard

Albert Read is the Executive Chairman of The Evening Standard and former managing director of Condé Nast Britain, overseeing titles and businesses including British Vogue, GQ, Vanity Fair, GQ Style, Tatler, Condé Nast Traveller, Glamour, Wired UK, Love, House & Garden and World of Interiors.

Read was previously a journalist, before moving into a business role at Conde Nast. From 2006 onwards Read played a pivotal role in managing Conde Nast's business interests in the UK and internationally.

Albert Read is also the author of The Imagination Muscle, published by Little Brown in the UK and Union Square in the US. The book was described as 'super sharp...an extraordinary book' by the Spectator 'a beautifully written meditation' by the Economist. It was named as one of Bloomberg's best books of 2023 and was nominated on JP Morgan's Next List 2025 .

== Early life and education ==
Read was born in London. He was educated at Cardinal Vaughan Memorial School, Ampleforth College and New College, Oxford, where he read classics. He received an MBA from INSEAD in 2000.

== Career ==
Read began his career as a journalist, writing and editing for The Spectator, The Daily Mail, The Daily Express and The Daily Telegraph, before moving to Conde Nast. It was stated in interviews that Read wanted to transition from journalist to the business side of publishing and began that transition once he had joined Condé Nast International.

In this role he developed the distribution of Condé Nast titles to the Asian market, including the launch of Vogue China and Vogue India. During the same period, he was listed on the Evening Standard's 2007 list of London's 100 Most Influential People.

In 2009 Read became publishing director of Wired UK. After holding a number of business roles at Condé Nast he was promoted to deputy managing director of Condé Nast Britain in early 2012.

In January 2017 it was announced that Read would be replacing Nicholas Coleridge as the managing director of Conde Nast Britain. The role meant Read would be responsible for the publication of many well-known British publications, including British Vogue, Vanity Fair, Tatler, Condé Nast Traveller, Glamour, GQ, and others.

In 2018 it was announced that Condé Nast Traveller's editorial teams internationally and in the United States would be merged. The newly formed editorial team would be based in London under Read's guidance. In July 2019 Read also appeared on BBC Business Live speaking about the market conditions of the magazine industry, and also spoke to The New York Times in late 2019 about The World of Interiors.

During the outbreak of the COVID-19 pandemic, Read made the decision to unlock the May issues of certain publications, providing readers with free-digital access. He was also interviewed regularly about the health of Condé Nast's publications and the wider publishing industry during the pandemic.

== Other roles ==
Read was a director of Ian Fleming Publications, best known for their involvement in the James Bond franchise. He is a board member of the Independent Press Standards Organisation's regulatory funding committee.

== Personal life and family ==
Read is the son of the novelist and historian Piers Paul Read and is the grandson of Sir Herbert Read, poet, art critic and founder of the Institute of Contemporary Arts.

He lives in London with his wife, author and editor, Catherine Ostler, and their children.
