= George Browne (cricketer) =

English cricketer

George Fairbrother Browne (28 January 1835 – 28 May 1919) was an English cricketer. The place of his birth is not known; he died in Lowestoft, Suffolk and is buried at Kirkley Cemetery.

Browne debuted for Sussex against Middlesex in 1864, in a match which finished in an innings defeat.

Browne's second and final first-class appearance saw him play for Middlesex against Hampshire, partnering Indian-born future Australian Test cricketer Bransby Cooper in the middle order.
