= George Brown (Benedictine) =

English Benedictine and prior

George Brown (died 21 October 1618), who later adopted the religious name Gregory, was an English Benedictine and prior of St Laurence, Dieulouard. He was for some time identified as the anonymous translator of Life of St Mary Magdalen de' Pazzi (1619), an identification that is now challenged.

== Biography ==
Brown was born in Essex, and spent two years at the English College, Douai. After this, he left to join the Order of Saint Benedict in Spain. In 1605, he was professed at the abbey of Santa Maria, in Obarnes, where he took the religious name of Gregory. From 1609 to 1610, Brown was the prior of the monastery of St Laurence, Dieulouard, in Lorraine. This monastery was occupied by English Benedictines, founded in 1608 by monks fleeing the English Reformation, and trained Catholic missionaries for the conversion of their home country. According to Athanasius Allanson, Brown was "a diligent promoter" of Benedictine religious houses in France and the Low Countries. From 1613 until his death, Brown resided at Chelles Abbey, joining Francis Walgrave and Augustine Bradshaw, who had been invited there by Abbess Marie de Lorraine as chaplains to the monastery. Here, Brown died on 21 October 1618.

== Life of St Mary Magdalen de' Pazzi (1619) ==
The English translation of the Italian biography of Mary Magdalene de' Pazzi, Life of St Mary Magdalen de' Pazzi (1619), was attributed to Brown by 19th-century Catholic Historian, George Oliver. This identification was based on Oliver's misidentification of Brown as chaplain of the English Benedictine monastery, St Benet, Brussels, established by his misreading of the monastery's convent chronicle. As the original translation had been dedicated to Lady Mary Percy, abbess of the Brussels monastery, Oliver identified Brown as its author. This identification has been contested by A. F. Allison and D. M. Rogers, in their Contemporary printed literature of the English Counter-Reformation (1989), instead identifying Tobie Matthew as a more likely candidate.
