= George Brown (coach) =

American football coach (1911–1968)

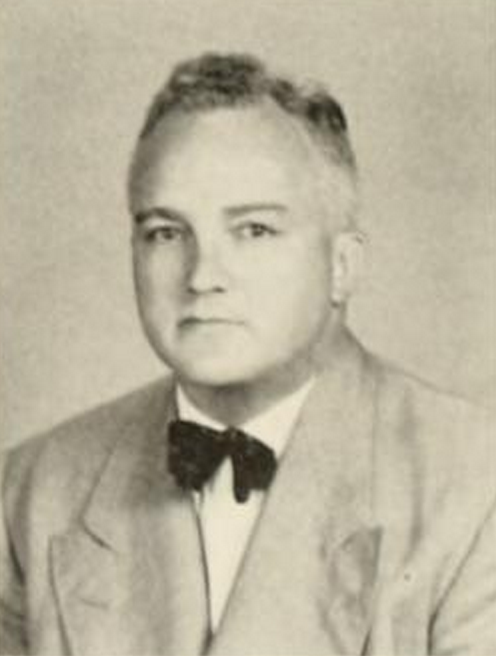

Biographical details
- Born: May 17, 1911; Columbus, Ohio, U.S.
- Died: September 27, 1968 (aged 57); Montclair, New Jersey, U.S.

Coaching career (HC unless noted)
- 1953: Montclair State

Head coaching record
- Overall: 4–1

George Anthony Brown (May 17, 1911 – September 27, 1968) was an American basketball and football coach. He served as the head football coach of the Montclair State University Red Hawks in Upper Montclair, New Jersey for the 1953 season, compiling a 4–1 record. He was born in Ohio.

== Life and career ==
Brown was born in Columbus, Ohio, on May 17, 1911.

Brown worked as a director of athletics at Milligan college in Tennessee, before joining Upper Iowa University as head basketball and football line coach.

Brown played for the New York Giants American football team.

Brown married Margaret Elizabeth Ferri in 1939. He died in Montclair, New Jersey on September 27, 1968, at the age of 57.

== Head coaching record ==
Year	Team	Overall	Conference	Standing	Bowl/playoffs
Montclair State Indians (Independent) (1953)
1953	Montclair State	4–1			
Montclair State:		4–1			
Total:		4–1			
