= Tom Waller =

Tom Waller (full name Thomas de Warrenne Waller; born 4 April 1974 in Bangkok, Thailand) is a film director, screenwriter, and producer.

Waller founded the production company De Warrenne Pictures Ltd and secured funding for the film Monk Dawson (1998), his directorial debut, a story based on an award-winning novel by Piers Paul Read. He went on to produce the films Eviction (1999), Butterfly Man (2002), Ghost of Mae Nak (2005), The Elephant King (2006) and Soi Cowboy, (2008) which was selected in Un Certain Regard at the Cannes Film Festival. His second directorial feature was Mindfulness and Murder (2010), a Thai language murder mystery based on the novel of the same name by Nick Wilgus.

In 2006, he directed the music video El Nin-YO! for Thai singer Tata Young. Waller has also served as producer on three feature titles for American studio Millennium Films; The Prince and Me 4: The Elephant Adventure (2010), Elephant White (2011) and Ninja 2 (2013).

In 2014, he produced and directed The Last Executioner, a biopic on Thailand's last prison executioner, which won the prestigious 'Tukkata Tong' or Golden Doll awards for Best Picture, given by the Thai Entertainment Reporters Association. In 2016 he served as line producer for the action sequel Mechanic: Resurrection, starring Jason Statham, Jessica Alba, Tommy Lee Jones and Michelle Yeoh.

In 2016, he won the best director award in Dhak, tional Film Festival. In 2018, Waller directed an independent film about the Tham Luang cave rescue. Titled The Cave (original Thai title: Nang Non), the film played at the 2019 Bal. A reedited version of the film, titled Cave Rescue, was released by Lionsgate in 2022.

In 2024, he directed Kiss of the Con Queen, starring Ravi Patel.
