= George Browne (umpire) =

West Indian cricket umpire (born 1934)

Personal information
- Born: 28 April 1934 (age 92); Saint Vincent

Umpiring information
- ODIs umpired: 1 (1988)
- Source: Cricinfo, 16 May 2014

George T. Browne (born 28 April 1934) is a former West Indian cricket umpire. He mainly umpired at the first-class level. The only international match he officiated in was an ODI game in 1988.

== See also ==
- List of One Day International cricket umpires
