= George Brown (Australian politician, born 1929) =

George Brown (29 July 1929 – 8 January 2002) was an Australian local politician and Lord Mayor of Darwin in the Northern Territory of Australia.

== Early life ==
George Brown first came to Darwin on a golfing holiday.

He was the curator of Darwin Botanic Gardens, now named after him. Cyclone Tracy, which hit Darwin on 24 December 1974 destroyed 89 per cent of the plants in the garden. Brown was away at the time, but returned to Darwin as soon as he could. Despite being stopped at a checkpoint at gunpoint, he ignored the threat, determined to return to Darwin.

== Politics ==
Brown was the Lord Mayor of Darwin from 1992 until 2002. He caused controversy in the later years of his service for his colourful use of language. He died while in office in 2002.

The Northern Territory Government renamed the Darwin Botanic Gardens the George Brown Darwin Botanic Gardens in recognition of Brown's 32 years of service and contribution to the development of Darwin.
