= Athanasius Allanson =

Athanasius Allanson (11 June 1804 – 13 January 1876) was an English Benedictine monk and historian, and Abbot of Glastonbury from 1874 to 1876. His secular forename was Peter. London-born, he attended Ampleforth College in 1813 and graduated. He worked extensively at the Abbey.

He was sent to St Peter's, Liverpool in 1828 but later worked at the mission at Swinburne, Northumberland for the remaining 47 years of his life. In 1842, whilst working there, he was asked by the General Chapter of the English monks to prepare an historical account of monks since 1600. When he had completed it, he composed the Biography of the English Benedictines, completed around 1858, but not published until 1999.
