= George Harold Brown =

American research engineer (1908–1987)

- Born: 14 October 1908; North Milwaukee, Wisconsin
- Died: 11 December 1987 (aged 79); Princeton, New Jersey
- Engineering career
- Awards: IEEE Edison Medal (1967)

George Harold Brown (14 October 1908 – 11 December 1987) was an American research engineer. He was a prolific inventor who held more than 80 patents and wrote over 100 technical papers.

He led the RCA Corporation's efforts to develop a color television system which is still in use today. He was associated with the RCA for over forty years, becoming an executive vice president for research and engineering in November 1961.

== Education and early career ==
Brown's father, a railway employee, was of Scottish descent, his mother's family was German. He attended high school at Portage, Wisconsin. As a schoolboy he was already experimenting with constructing his own crystal-detector receiver. After graduation he studied electrical engineering at the University of Wisconsin, Madison.

He was still only a college junior when he spent a summer in the Test Department at the General Electric Company in Schenectady, New York. He won two highly competitive graduate fellowships and received a B.S. (1930), an M.S. (1931) and a Ph.D. (1933) for his work on broadcast antennas and ground systems.

In 1933 Brown joined RCA at Camden, New Jersey, where he conducted research into AM broadcasting antennas that became standard throughout the world.

In 1935 a commission to produce an antenna with omnidirectional radiation, i.e. equal at all points of the compass, led him to develop the turnstile antenna, so-called because it looked like a turnstile. This offered an effective combination of high gain and broad bandwidth with a wave propagation pattern that made it possible to broadcast FM radio and television signals over long distances. To this design he later added an absorbing resistor which resulted in increased bandwidth and permitted the simultaneous radiation of television pictures and sound from the same antenna.

In 1939 he produced a device for enabling high resolution of broadcast television. He named it the "vestigial side-band filter". It was accepted in January 1939 by the Federal Communications Commission for broadcasting throughout the US, and it is used throughout the world today.

He moved to the new central research laboratories of the RCA at Princeton, New Jersey, in 1942. By this time he was developing radio and radar antennas for military systems. He was awarded a Certificate of Appreciation from the War Department for his contributions.

He and his colleagues developed a method for speeding the production of penicillin by means of radio-frequency heating techniques. Using inexpensive vacuum pumps and simple condensers it was estimated to be about one-tenth of the cost of freeze drying. Radio-frequency heating also became used in the manufacture of plastic raincoats, bags and other products.

George Brown made pioneering developments in directional antennas, much of which was published in the Proceedings of the Institute of Radio Engineers in the mid thirties, and has been republished in several engineering handbooks.

== Promotions, awards, and honors ==
Brown had an illustrious career with RCA, becoming director of the Systems Research Laboratory in 1952, chief engineer, Commercial and Industrial Electronic Products at Camden in 1957, vice-president, Research and Engineering, in 1961, and executive vice-president, Patents and Licensing, in 1968. He was a member of the RCA board of directors from 1965 until his retirement in 1972.

He was a fellow of the Institute of Radio Engineers (IRE) and the American Institute of Electrical Engineers (AIEE) before the merger of those two societies into the Institute of Electrical and Electronics Engineers (IEEE).

He was a fellow of the American Association for the Advancement of Science and of the Royal Television Society. In 1972 he gave the prestigious Shoenberg Memorial Lecture at the Royal Institution. He received many awards: the De Forest Audion Award of the Veteran Wireless Operators Association in 1968, an honorary D.Eng. from the University of Rhode Island in 1968, and the 1967 IEEE Edison Medal: "For a meritorious career distinguished by significant engineering contributions to antenna development, electromagnetic propagation, the broadcast industry, the art of radio frequency heating, and color television".

== Personality ==
George Brown was a notable personality and powerful communicator and was widely sought as an after-dinner speaker, on which occasions he could be informative as well as witty, spicing his speeches with many amusing anecdotes. He hated pomposity, and several people who tried to conceal ignorance or incompetence became victims of his acerbic wit in his memoirs.

He could also appear modest. On one occasion someone introduced him –somewhat inaccurately – as the greatest mathematician in the USA. He quickly protested: "Oh, please don't say that. Just say: the greatest mathematician in Mercer Road". The joke was that he lived in the same road in Princeton as Albert Einstein and Hermann Weyl.

== Family life ==
George Brown married in December 1932. His wife, Elizabeth Ward, was also a graduate student at the University of Wisconsin–Madison. She was a loyal support to him during more than fifty years of marriage, always sharing the interests of his professional life. Their twin sons were born in 1934.

Brown devoted much time during his early retirement to the writing of his memoirs which are full of entertaining anecdotes as well as constituting a first-hand account of the history of the technical development of television broadcasting.

He died on 11 December 1987, aged 79, at his home in Princeton after a long illness.
