= George Broun =

George Broun may refer to:

== Baronets ==
- Sir George Broun, 2nd Baronet (died 1718), of the Broun baronets
- Sir George Broun, 3rd Baronet (died 1734), of the Broun baronets

== Others ==
- George Broun-Lindsay (1888–1964), Scottish MP
- George Broun, Lord Coalston, see David Dalrymple, Lord Hailes

== See also ==
- George Brown (disambiguation)
- Broun (surname)
