= Francisco Abal =

Uruguayan rugby player

- Born: Francisco Domingo Abal Guerault; 24 June 1951; Montevideo, Uruguay
- Died: 13 October 1972 (aged 21); Argentine Andes, Mendoza
- Other name: Panchito
- Known for: Uruguayan Air Force Flight 571 crash victim

Francisco Domingo Abal Guerault (24 June 1951 – 13 October 1972) was a Uruguayan rugby player. He was part of the Old Christians Club and was considered one of the best rugby players in his country. In 1970 he was part of the Uruguayan rugby team.

Part of his life and the tragedy experienced during the Uruguayan Air Force Flight 571 is featured in the film Society of the Snow. Abal is played by Argentine actor Jerónimo Bosia. The character Felipe Restano (portrayed by Josh Lucas) in Alive (1993 film) is also based on Abal.

== Biography ==
In Miracle in the Andes, the book by his childhood friend Fernando Nando Parrado, Abal is described as a good-looking young man from a family with good social and economic status. He had earned, by the time he was 15, like Parrado, a place in the Stella Maris First XV, the starting line-up of the Old Christians rugby team. He graduated from Stella Maris School.

The Abal family owned a cigarette factory where Francisco had started working. He was also a shareholder of Abal Hnos. Francisco is known for being one of the 45 passengers of the Uruguayan Air Force Flight 571 that crashed in October 1972 in the Argentine sector of the Andes Mountains.

=== Uruguayan Air Force Flight 571 ===
On the plane he was traveling next to Nando, in the right row of seats but in the aisle seat. He later asked his friend to change seats. Also on the plane was his cousin, Javier Methol, 36, with his wife Liliana, 34. Javier was an executive and shareholder in the Abal cigarette factory and a survivor of the tragedy.

After the crash, Panchito was badly injured and his legs were damaged, but in spite of the injury he was able to speak; it is known that he told part of the events of the accident. When the provisional wall was built to cover the hole in the plane, he was laid there along with the other seriously injured: the siblings Susana and Nando Parrado. During that night, with a trickle of voice, he asked for help that nobody could give him and murmured that he was freezing. Later at dawn, when medicine students Roberto Canessa and Gustavo Zerbino examined the wounded the next morning, they realized that he had died as a result of his wounds and the extreme cold. The corpse was covering Susana Parrado and presented a purple hue in the extremities. He was only 21 years old. Susana died a few days later. Currently, his remains rest together with the other victims five meters (20 feet) from the monument in their honor at the site of the accident.

== Bibliography ==
- Guiver, John (2022). To Play the Game: A History of Flight 571. Heddon. ISBN 978-1-913166-69-4.
- Read, Piers Paul (1974). Alive: The Story of the Andes Survivors (First ed.). J. B. Lippincott Company. ISBN 039701001X. The 1993 film, Alive, is an adaptation of this book.
- Vierci, Pablo (2024). Society of the Snow: The Definitive Account of the World's Greatest Survival Story. Translated by Erikson, Jennie. Constable. ISBN 978-1408716373. Originally published in Spanish in 2008 as La Sociedad de la Nieve: Por Primera Vez Los 16 Sobrevivientes Cuentan la Historia Completa. The 2023 film, Society of the Snow, is an adaptation of this book.
