= Gustavo Zerbino =

Uruguayan businessman and plane crash survivor

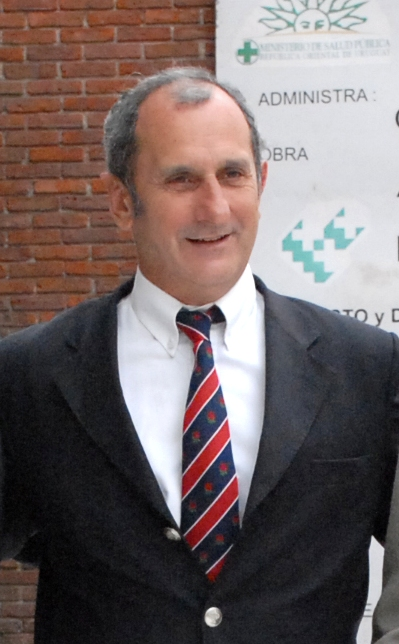

President of the Uruguayan Rugby Union
- In office 20 December 2007 – 2011
- Preceded by: Pablo Ferrari
- Succeeded by: Marcello Calandra

Personal details
- Born: Gustavo Carlos Zerbino Stajano; 16 May 1953 (age 72) Montevideo, Uruguay
- Children: 6
- Education: University of the Republic
- Occupation: Businessman; motivational speaker; rugby official

Gustavo Carlos Zerbino Stajano (born May 16, 1953) is a Uruguayan businessman, motivational speaker, sports executive and former rugby union player. He is known for being one of the 16 survivors of the Uruguayan Air Force Flight 571 that crashed in the Andes on October 13, 1972.

== Early life and education ==
Gustavo Zerbino was born in Montevideo on May 16, 1953, as the son of lawyer Jorge Zerbino Cavajani and his wife Susana Stajano Ferreiro. He is one of the couple's nine children, and a maternal descendant of Carlos Stajano, one of the founders of Carrasco Polo Club. Raised in the Carrasco neighborhood, he attended Stella Maris College and played for its alumni rugby union team, Old Christians.

In 1972, he enrolled at the University of the Republic to study medicine.

== Crash of Flight 571 ==
On October 13, 1972, at the age of 19, Zerbino was a passenger on Uruguayan Air Force Flight 571, which crashed in the Andes; of the 45 passengers, he was one of the 16 who were rescued from the mountain. While the other survivors were rescued after 72 days, Zerbino stayed an extra day to return with the others' belongings.

During an interview in 2022, he said of his experience on the mountain:

First I would like to clarify what was a tragedy for some and for others, a miracle. There are mothers who talk about the miracle of life and others exclaim, "How will it be miracle if I lost my son?" Then, I would say it's a story of love, friendship, solidarity and vocation of service. Life is a miracle and death is a mystery. In the middle is what we have to live. I was 18 and I was 73 days on the mountain, and today I'm 68. While the mountain [experience] is something out of the ordinary, tragedy is the invasion of Ukraine. Life gives you the possibility to live things that mark you but that allow you to grow.

== Career ==
After returning to Uruguay from the Andes, Zerbino continued studying medicine but ultimately did not graduate. Instead, he earned a business administration degree from the University of the Republic. He also continued playing rugby union, he was a member of the national team, and participated in the 1973 and 1977 South American Rugby championships, in which Uruguay finished as runner-up.

Since 1980, he has been director of Cibeles S.A., his family's pharmaceutical company founded in 1975. He also has served as president of the Chamber of Pharmaceutical and Related Specialties of Uruguay (CEFA).

He is co-founder and vice president of Rugby sin Fronteras (Spanish for 'Rugby without Borders'), a foundation created in 2009 with the aim of promoting the values of this sport through awareness campaigns, events, conferences and sporting events. In addition, as a sports executive and administrator, in December 2007 he was elected president of the Uruguayan Rugby Union, and in 2009 was re-elected for a second two-year term. In 2011 he was succeeded by Marcello Calandra.

== Personal life ==
Zerbino was married for thirteen years to Paqui Paysée, with whom he had four children, Gustavo, Sebastián, Lucas, and Martín; the latter was a member of the band Toco Para Vos.

In 2000, he began a relationship with the Argentine María González, whom he later married. Together they had two daughters, Luma—Gonzalez's daughter, whom Zerbino adopted—and Lupita. After fifteen years together, they divorced; in October 2019, María González died of breast cancer.

== Filmography ==
Zerbino was portrayed by actor David Kriegel in Frank Marshall's 1993 feature film Alive, and by Tomás Wolf in the 2023 feature film, Society of the Snow.

Year	Title	Role	Notes
1993	Alive: 20 Years Later	himself	video documentary
2007	Stranded: I've Come from a Plane That Crashed on the Mountains	himself	documentary
2009	Independent Lens' (Stranded: The Andes Plane Crash Survivors)	himself	TV series documentary
2010	I Am Alive: Surviving the Andes Plane Crash	himself	documentary aired on History Channel
2023	Society of the Snow	Rugby Coach	feature film

== Bibliography ==
- Read, Piers Paul (1974). Alive: The Story of the Andes Survivors (First ed.). J. B. Lippincott Company. ISBN 039701001X. The 1993 film, Alive, is an adaptation of this book.
- Vierci, Pablo (2024). Society of the Snow: The Definitive Account of the World's Greatest Survival Story. Translated by Erikson, Jennie. Constable. ISBN 978-1408716373. Originally published in Spanish in 2008 as La Sociedad de la Nieve: Por Primera Vez Los 16 Sobrevivientes Cuentan la Historia Completa. The 2023 film, Society of the Snow, is an adaptation of this book.
