= I Am Alive: Surviving the Andes Plane Crash =

2010 television documentary

- Directed by: Brad Osborne
- Starring: Nando Parrado; Roberto Canessa

Production
- Production company: AMS Pictures

Original release
- Network: History Channel
- Release: October 20, 2010

I Am Alive: Surviving the Andes Plane Crash is a 2010 television documentary recounting the tragedy of Uruguayan Air Force Flight 571 in the Andes mountains from the perspective of survivor Nando Parrado. It is a 2-hour special with reenactments of the October 13, 1972 crash, a deadly avalanche and the 72-day struggle for survival that followed, including details of the 60-kilometre (37 mi) trek out of the mountains by Parrado and fellow survivor Roberto Canessa. I Am Alive was produced by AMS Pictures and premiered on the History Channel on October 20, 2010. It was released for DVD on February 22, 2011.

== Survivor interviews ==
- Nando Parrado
- Roberto Canessa
- Carlitos Paez
- Eduardo Strauch
- Gustavo Zerbino

== Cast ==
- James Lentzsch as Nando Parrado
- Benjamin Josse as Roberto Canessa
- Kelly Haitz as Susy Parrado
- Cindy Latch as Zenia Parrado
- Vince Roberts as Carlitos Paez
- Dorian Roberts as Eduardo Strauch
- Everette Scott Ortiz as Gustavo Zerbino
- Ben Keyworth as Marcelo Perez
- Heather Child as Liliana Methol
- Mark T. Lee as Javier Methol
- Alfred Ramirez as Panchito Abal
- Taylor Witt as Antonio Vizintin
- Larry Rodriguez as Col. Julio Fernandez
- Tim Wylie as Lt. Col. Dante Lagurara
- Grayson Howe as Numa Turcatti
- Daniel Cruz as Bobby Francois
- Lico Reyes as Sergio Catalan

== Reception ==
Critic Linda Stasi of the New York Post awarded I Am Alive four stars, calling it "without question the finest survival documentary I have ever seen on TV."
