= Stranded (2007 film) =

2007 film

- Promotional film poster
- Directed by: Gonzalo Arijón
- Written by: Gonzalo Arijón
- Produced by: Hilary Sandison; Marc Silvera
- Starring: Jose Algorta; Roberto Canessa; Alfredo Delgado
- Cinematography: César Charlone
- Edited by: Claudio Hughes
- Music by: Florencia Di Concilio
- Distributed by: Zeitgeist Films
- Release date: November 24, 2007 (Amsterdam International Documentary Film Festival)
- Running time: 126 minutes
- Country: France
- Language: Spanish

Stranded: I've Come from a Plane that Crashed on the Mountains is a 2007 documentary film which tells the story of a rugby team from Uruguay whose plane, Uruguayan Air Force Flight 571, crashed in the Andes Mountains on October 13, 1972. The documentary recounts the struggle to survive by the people on board who survived the initial crash and by the 16 people who were found alive for 72 days, out of a total of 45 passenger and crew.

== Interviews (survivors, family, friends) ==
- Jose Algorta (as José Pedro Algorta)
- Laura Canessa
- Roberto Canessa
- Juan Catalan
- Sergio Catalan
- Alfredo “Pancho” Delgado
- Daniel Fernandez
- Roberto François
- Roy Harley
- Jose Luis “Coche” Inciarte
- Alvaro Mangino
- Jorge Massa
- Javier Methol
- Juan Pedro Nicola
- Mateo Nicola
- Carlos Páez Rodríguez
- Madelón Rodríguez
- Nando Parrado
- Ramón Sabella
- Adolfo Strauch
- Alejandra Strauch
- Eduardo Strauch
- Rosina Strauch
- Antonio “Tintin” Vizintín
- Lucas Zerbino Payssé
- Martín Zerbino Payssé
- Sebastián Zerbino Payssé
- Gustavo Zerbino

== Critical reception ==
On the review aggregator website Rotten Tomatoes, 92% of 37 critics' reviews are positive, with an average rating of 7.9/10. The website's consensus reads: "Stranded is a thoroughly uplifting account of the well-known tragedy, with touching testimony from remaining survivors." On Metacritic, it received a weighted score of 82 out of 100, based on 15 critics, indicating “universal acclaim.”

== See also ==
- Survival film, about the film genre, with a list of related films
