= Javier Methol =

Uruguayan businessman

- Born: Javier Alfredo Methol Abal; 11 December 1935; Montevideo, Uruguay
- Died: 4 June 2015 (aged 79); Montevideo, Uruguay
- Spouse(s): Liliana Beatriz Navarro (m. 1960; died 1972) Ana María Amorrortu (m. 1976)

Javier Alfredo Methol Abal (11 December 1935 – 4 June 2015) was a Uruguayan businessman and lecturer, known for being one of the 16 survivors of the Uruguayan Air Force Flight 571 crash in the Andes Mountains in October 1972.

== Early life ==
He was born in Montevideo in 1935 to an upper-middle class family of Basque-French and Galician descent.

After graduating from high school at the Elbio Fernández School, he started working at the Abal Hnos S.A. cigarette factory, which belonged to his mother's family. At the age of 20, he moved to Cuba and the United States to become a technician in the tobacco industry. While in the United States, he was diagnosed with tuberculosis and had to remain hospitalized there for five months before returning to Uruguay.

== Accident in the Andes ==
He was one of the 45 people who on October 13, 1972, boarded the Fairchild Hiller FH-227 of Uruguayan Air Force Flight 571, together with his wife Liliana Navarro. At the time of the accident, he was 36 years old and had 4 children. His cousin, Francisco Panchito Abal, died of injuries sustained in the crash. Liliana lost her life during the avalanche, which also killed others who had survived the crash. Within the community that lived in the Fairchild for more than 70 days, Javier Methol's mature figure allowed him to be one of the main leaders. The boys affectionately called him Dumbo.

== Later life and death ==
After his return to Uruguay following the crash in the Andes, he continued working at Abal Hnos S.A., being a member of the company's board of directors and manager of corporate affairs. In 1979, it was acquired by the tobacco company Philip Morris International. In addition, for several years he gave motivational lectures based on his survival experience.

Methol died on June 4, 2015, at the British Hospital of Montevideo, at the age of 79, from melanoma. The following day, the wake was celebrated with a mass at the San José de la Montaña de Carrasco and a funeral procession was held at the Buceo Cemetery, where his remains were buried.

He was the founder and first president of the ¡Viven! Foundation in 2007.

== Personal life ==
In 1960, he married Liliana Beatriz Navarro, with whom he had four children: María Laura, Pablo Javier, Anna Inés and Marie Noel.

Four years after Navarro's death he remarried Ana María Amorrortu from Argentina, with whom he had four more children: Guillermo Javier, Rafael Javier, Ignacio Javier and Ximena María.

He was a cousin of Francisco Abal, who died during the accident. He was a Catholic.

== Bibliography ==
- Read, Piers Paul (1974). Alive: The Story of the Andes Survivors (First ed.). J. B. Lippincott Company. ISBN 039701001X. The 1993 film, Alive, is an adaptation of this book.
- Vierci, Pablo (2024). Society of the Snow: The Definitive Account of the World's Greatest Survival Story. Translated by Erikson, Jennie. Constable. ISBN 978-1408716373. Originally published in Spanish in 2008 as La Sociedad de la Nieve: Por Primera Vez Los 16 Sobrevivientes Cuentan la Historia Completa. The 2023 film, Society of the Snow, is an adaptation of this book.
