= Mount Seler =

Mountain in the Andes mountain range

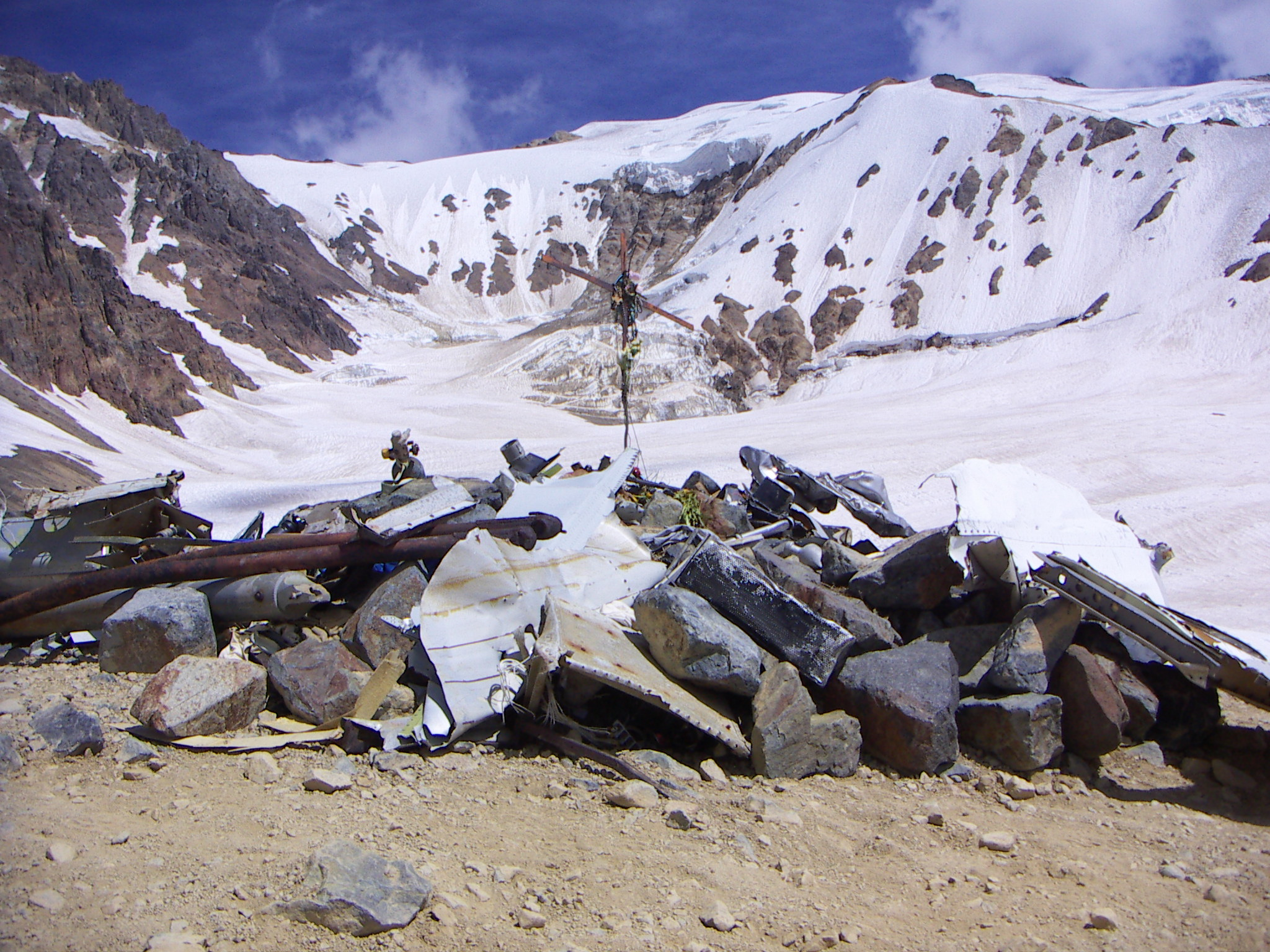
- The peak in the background, with a memorial at the crash site in the foreground

Highest point
- Elevation: 4,600 m (15,100 ft)
- Prominence: 127 m (417 ft)
- Isolation: 0.45 km (0.28 mi)
- Coordinates: 34°44′58″S 70°18′23″W

Naming
- Etymology: Seler Parrado

Geography
- Location within Argentina Location within Chile
- Countries: Argentina and Chile
- State(s): Mendoza Province (Argentina); O'Higgins Region (Chile)
- Parent range: Andes

Climbing
- First ascent: December 14, 1972 Nando Parrado

Mount Seler is a mountain located on the border between Argentina and Chile on the western rim of the Glacier of Tears cirque in the Andes mountain range. The mountain was first summited in December 1972 by Nando Parrado, and shortly thereafter by Antonio Vizintin and Roberto Canessa, survivors from the nearby crash site of Uruguayan Air Force Flight 571. They made the ascent with the intent of finding civilization. At the summit, Parrado used lipstick to write "MT. SELER" on a plastic bag, which he placed under a rock. Nando named the mountain after his father Seler Parrado, who was his motivation to survive.

== Ascent ==
The ascent began on December 12, 1972, the 61st day after the survivors' plane had crashed, by Nando Parrado, Roberto Canessa, and Antonio Vizintin. The men had no mountaineering gear or experience; instead of beginning on a saddle to the sound, they set off up the steepest slope. They had the impression that they had crashed at the western limits of the Andes due to their pilot moaning "We passed Curicó" as he died. They climbed until the temperature began to drop. At twilight, they found a spot to sleep in the sleeping bag they had sewn using insulation from the plane and copper wire. The men continued climbing the next day, the incline of the climb increasing every hundred yards, before pitching camp before sunset.

The next morning, on December 14, Parrado and Vizintin continued climbing while Canessa stayed behind. After several hours, the incline had become almost vertical. Using an aluminium pole brought as a walking stick, Parrado carved stairs into the hard-packed snow. Parrado reached the summit late that morning, to immediate disappointment. It became apparent that their plane had crashed in the middle of the Andes, not near the western limits as they had thought. Using lipstick he brought to protect his lips, he wrote the words "MT. SELER" on a plastic bag, and placed it under a rock. Afterwards, Vizintin went back to get Canessa, who he reached the peak three hours later.

Area of the crash. The dotted green line follows Parrado and Canessa's route westward, with Mount Seler located where it crosses with the dotted red line. They trekked about 38 km (24 mi) over 10 days.

Vizintin left his meat with Parrado and Canessa, returning to the crash site, and the two carried on westwards from the mountain the next morning. They would continue walking until being sighted on December 20, and they were rescued with the rest of the survivors in the following days.
