= Miracle in the Andes =

2006 non-fiction book by Nando Parrado

- Hardcover edition
- Author: Nando Parrado; Vince Rause
- Original title: Milagro en los Andes
- Language: Spanish, English
- Genre: Non-fiction
- Publisher: Crown Publishers
- Publication date: May 9, 2006
- Publication place: Uruguay (author); United States (publisher)
- Pages: 304
- ISBN: 978-0756988470

Miracle in the Andes (in Spanish Milagro en los Andes) is a 2006 memoir by Nando Parrado and co-author Vince Rause, published by Crown. It documents his perspective within a rugby team's survival of a 1972 crash of Uruguayan Air Force Flight 571 into the Andes Mountains, and his life afterward.

== Story ==
Nando Parrado co-wrote the 2006 book Miracle in the Andes: 72 Days on the Mountain and My Long Trek Home, with Vince Rause. In it, Parrado returns to the events described in Piers Paul Read's 1974 book, Alive: The Story of the Andes Survivors which is the story of Uruguayan Air Force Flight 571, most passengers of which were in a Uruguayan rugby team consisting of alumni of Stella Maris College. The flight crashed into the Andes Mountains on October 13, 1972. Their meager food was consumed after ten days, so survivors agreed that all future survivors should eat any bodies, to endure until rescue.

Piers Paul Read's version was published two years after the rescue and was based upon interviews with the survivors. However, Miracle of the Andes is a memoir written 34 years later from Nando Parrado's perspective.

== Reception ==
Publishers Weekly wrote: "more than a companion to the 1970s best-selling chronicle of the disaster, Alive: The Story of the Andes Survivors, this is a fresh, gripping page-turner that will satisfy adventure readers, and a complex reflection on camaraderie, family and love."

Jon Krakauer, the author of Into Thin Air, said the book is "an astonishing account of an unimaginable ordeal".

== Adaptations ==
- The play Sobrevivir a los Andes (Surviving the Andes) was written by Gabriel Guerrero and premiered on 13 October 2017. Based on the account written by Nando Parrado, it was presented in 2017 at Teatro la Candela in Montevideo, Uruguay and in 2018 at Teatro Regina in Buenos Aires, Argentina.
- Miracle Flight 571, composed and created by Lloyd Burritt, is a two-act chamber opera based on Miracle in the Andes by Parrado. It received its musical premiere at the 2016 What Next Festival of Music.
