= Andes Museum 1972 =

Museum on the story of the 1972 Andes flight disaster

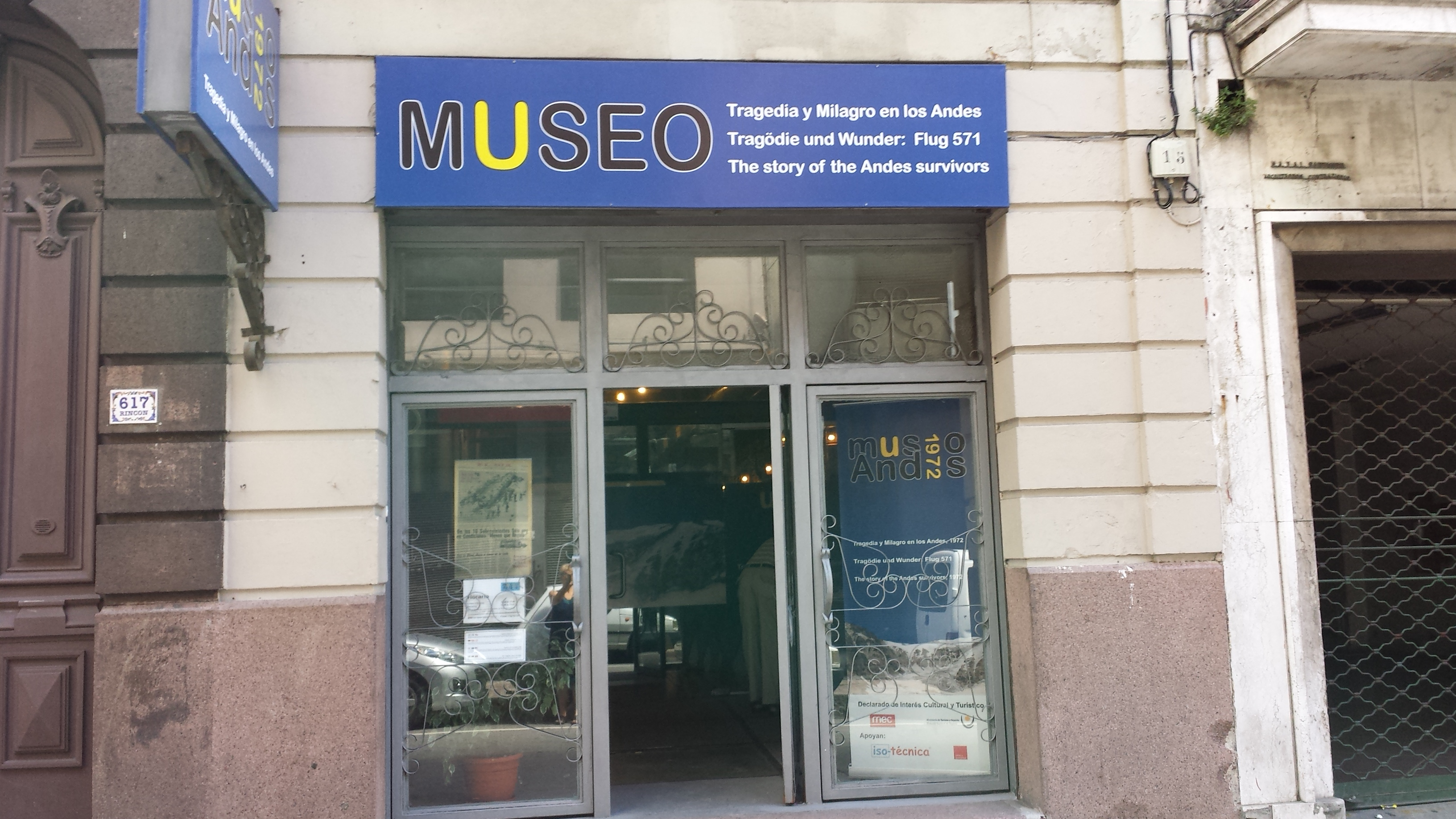
- Established: 2013
- Location: Ciudad Vieja, Montevideo (Uruguay)
- Coordinates: 34.905972°S 56.202914°W
- Type: Private
- Directors: Andrea Prada and Jörg P.A.Thomsen
- Curator: Jörg P. A. Thomsen
- Website: Museo Andes 1972 Official Site

The Andes Museum 1972 (Spanish: Museo Andes 1972) is located in The Old City in Montevideo, the capital city of Uruguay.

== Overview ==
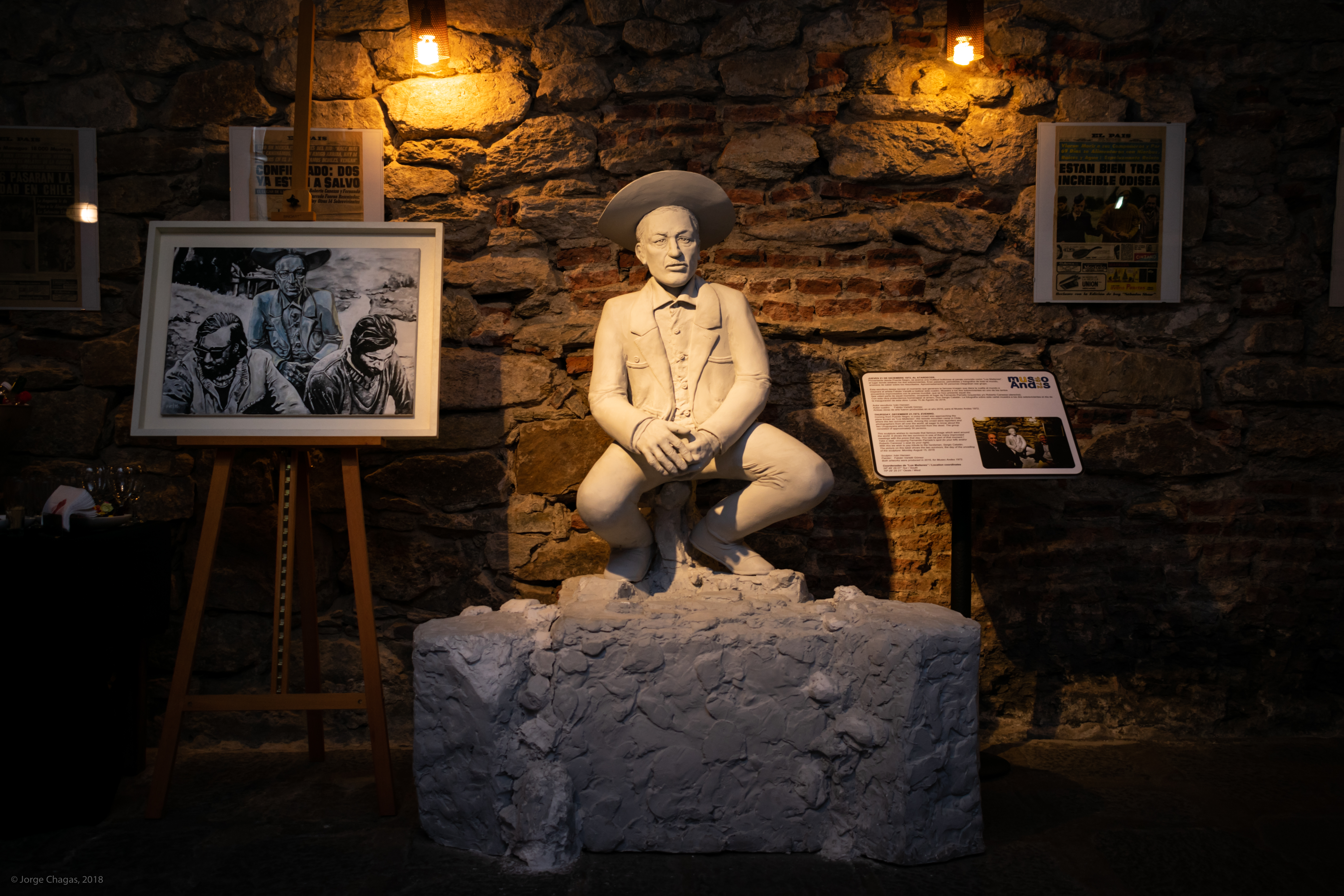
The sculpture of Sergio Catalán, a Chilean arriero, next to a display case with his original poncho, located in the Andes Museum 1972, Ciudad Vieja, Montevideo, Uruguay

The Andes Museum 1972 is dedicated to the story of the crash of Uruguayan Air Force Flight 571 in the Andes, involving a group of Uruguayan rugby players, their friends and relatives that were traveling to Chile when the airplane crashed.

The museum pays homage to the memory of the 29 people who died due to the plane accident in the Andes, and to those who risked their lives to save the rest. It is a reminder of those 16 Uruguayans who came back to life after the 72 days in the Andes freezing weather conditions with no food and proper clothing. It is a private enterprise declared of cultural interest by the MEC and the Ministerio de Turismo y Deporte de Uruguay.

The museum displays objects, documents, and photographs related to the Andes Tragedy in 1972. Many tourists from different parts of the world visit this museum since it is an object of global fascination, as documented in the museum visitor's book. There is graphic and textual information in Spanish and English.
