= Hotel Termas el Sosneado =

Historical ruins in the Andean range in Argentina

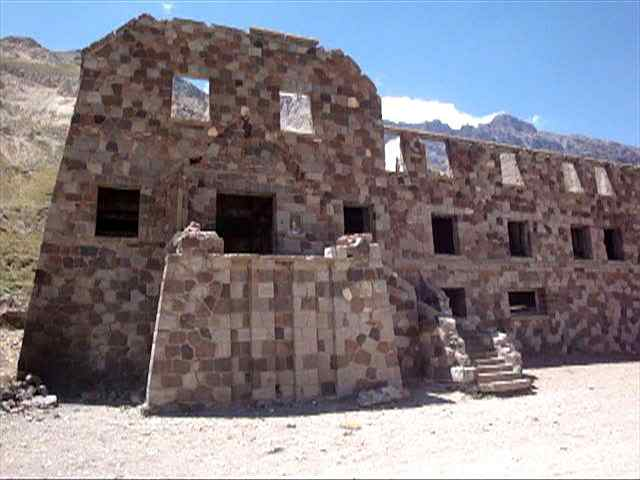
- The hotel's ruins
- Interactive map of the Hotel Termas el Sosneado area

General information
- Location: El Sosneado, San Rafael Department, Mendoza Province, Argentina
- Elevation: 2180 meters (7152 feet)
- Inaugurated: December 1938
- Destroyed: 1953

Hotel Termas el Sosneado was a hotel in the middle of the Andes, in the San Rafael Department, Mendoza Province, Argentina. Currently, only its ruins remain.

== History ==
The hotel was built in 1938 by the Compañía de Hoteles Sud Sudamericanos Ltda. (Sud South American Hotel Company Ltd.)―daughter company of railway corporation BAP (Buenos Aires and Pacific Railway)―and inaugurated in December of the same year with a strong marketing campaign and the presence of a lot of personalities from around the world.

It was built by the Atuel River, upon the Provincial Route 220, about 60 km (40 miles) northeast of El Sosneado, and at an altitude of 2180 meters (7152 feet).

One of the hotel's principal touristic attractions was the hot springs, with sulfur waters running down from del Overo Volcano, maintaining the pond hot and filled.

After 1953, the luxurious facilities were abandoned, and while some janitors stayed in the hotel for a longer period of time, it was eventually left alone.

=== 1972 Andes Plane crash ===
On 13 October 1972, Uruguayan Air Force Flight 571, chartered by an Uruguayan rugby football team (the Old Christians Club) and their supporters, to take them to a game in Santiago, Chile, crashed into a glacier in the heart of the Andes mountains. Unbeknownst to the passengers or the search teams, the flight had crashed in Argentina even before crossing into Chile, about 20 km (12 mi) from the Hotel Termas el Sosneado.

Currently, the crash site attracts hundreds of visitors from all over the world each year. The trip to the site takes three or four days. Four-wheel drive vehicles take visitors from the village of El Sosneado in Mendoza to Puesto Araya near the abandoned Hotel Termas el Sosneado. From there, travelers either continue on horseback or walk for three days to reach the crash site. They spend their first night in the Valley of Tears at the El Barroso camp site. On the third day, they reach the Las Lágrimas glacier and the crash site.
