= Stella Maris College (Montevideo) =

Christian Brothers College - Stella Maris
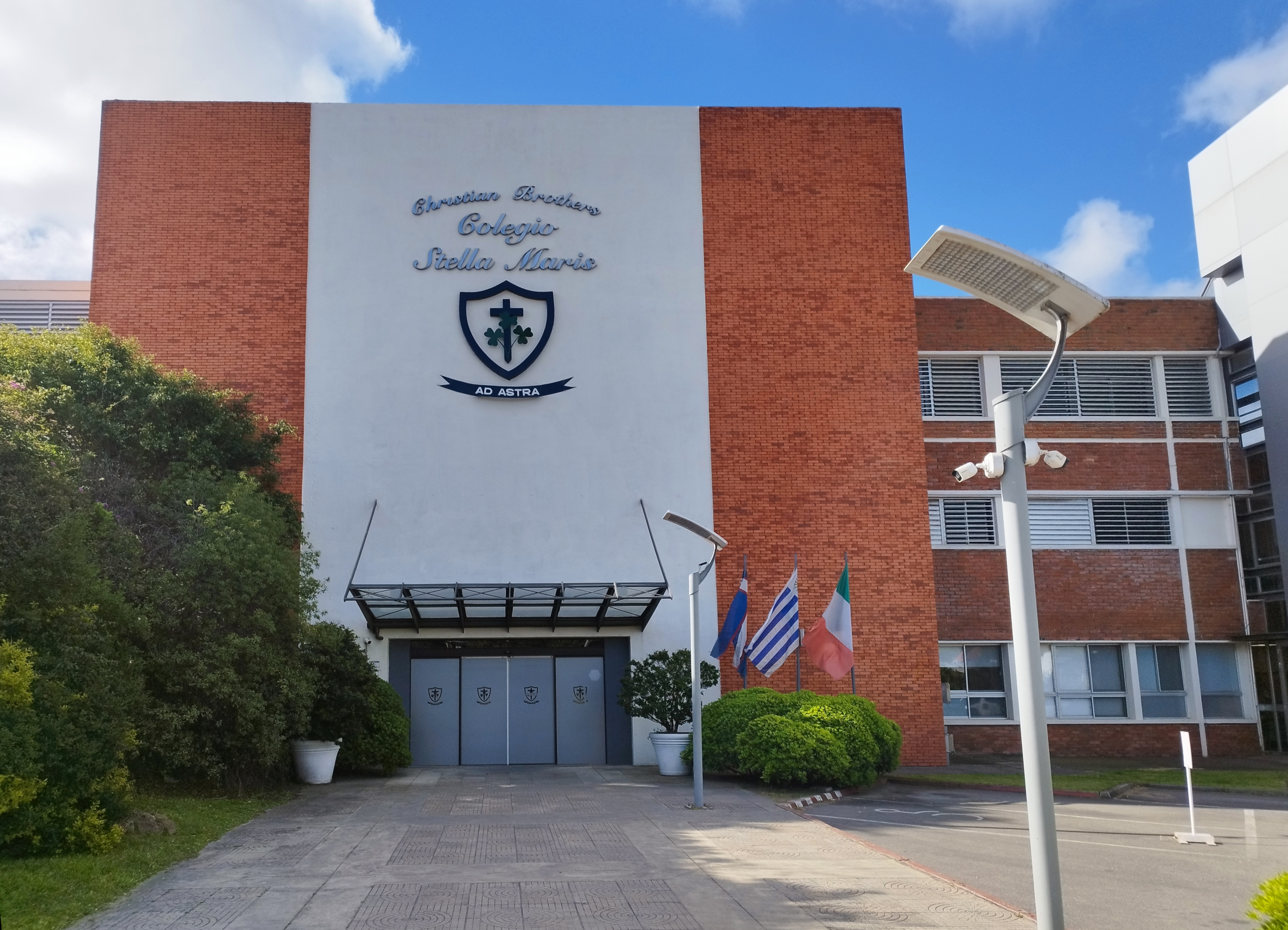
- Montevideo, Uruguay

Information
- Type: Private co-educational school
- Motto: "Ad Astra" (Up To The Stars)
- Established: 1955; 71 years ago
- Headmaster: Patricia Ponce de Leon
- Grades: K-12
- Campus: Carrasco Norte
- Colours: White, Green, Blue
- Affiliations: Roman Catholic, Christian Brothers, International Baccalaureate Organization
- Website: www.stellamaris.edu.uy

The Christian Brothers College of Montevideo, commonly referred as Stella Maris College – Christian Brothers or just Christian, is a private, co-educational, not-for-profit Catholic primary and secondary school run by the Christian Brothers of Ireland. The school is located in the residential neighborhood of Carrasco Norte, Montevideo, Uruguay. The school's headmaster is Patricia Ponce de Leon. The school is a member of the International Baccalaureate Organization (IBO), currently offering the International Baccalaureate Diploma Program (IBDP). The college also offers valuable international exams such as the IGCSE programs and the A levels. It has a long list of distinguished former pupils, including economists, engineers, architects, lawyers, politicians and sportspeople.

The school has also played an important part in the development of rugby union in Uruguay, with the creation of Old Christians Club, the school's alumni club.

== The Andes Accident of 1972 ==
The school gained accidental fame when its alumni rugby team crashed in the Andes Mountains on October 13, 1972, on Uruguayan Air Force Flight 571. The story of the crash and rescue was first told in the 1974 book Alive: The Story of the Andes Survivors and in the 2006 book Miracle in the Andes: 72 Days on the Mountain and My Long Trek Home. The school also appeared in the documentary, Alive: 20 Years Later.

Twelve of the 45 people on board the plane died in the crash, with several more dying of their injuries in the ensuing days. Another eight perished in an avalanche. The remaining survivors endured hunger, crash-related injuries, altitude sickness, and temperatures that fell to 30 degrees below zero at night. On their eighth day in the mountains, they heard on the radio that the authorities had stopped searching for them. When their scarce food reserves were gone, they were forced to eat those who had died in the crash.

On December 12, three of the remaining survivors set out to find help, hiking west across the Andes Mountains to reach Chile. After scaling the 15,000-foot Mount Seler, they realized that the trek for help would take them much longer than they had thought. Therefore, to conserve their limited food supply, one of them returned to the crash site and the other two continued hiking west.

On 21 December 1972, the ninth day of their journey, they were found by huasos who grazed livestock in the high country, and the next day, the world learned of the 16 survivors who had cheated death for 72 days in the Andes Mountains, in part by resorting to cannibalism.

== Notable alumni ==
- Roberto Canessa
- Bautista Mascia
- Juan Cruz Mascia
- Nando Parrado
- Carlos Páez Rodríguez
- Gonzalo Rodríguez
- Pablo Vierci
- Gustavo Zerbino
