= Uruguayan Air Force Flight 571 =

1972 aviation accident in the Andes mountains of Argentina

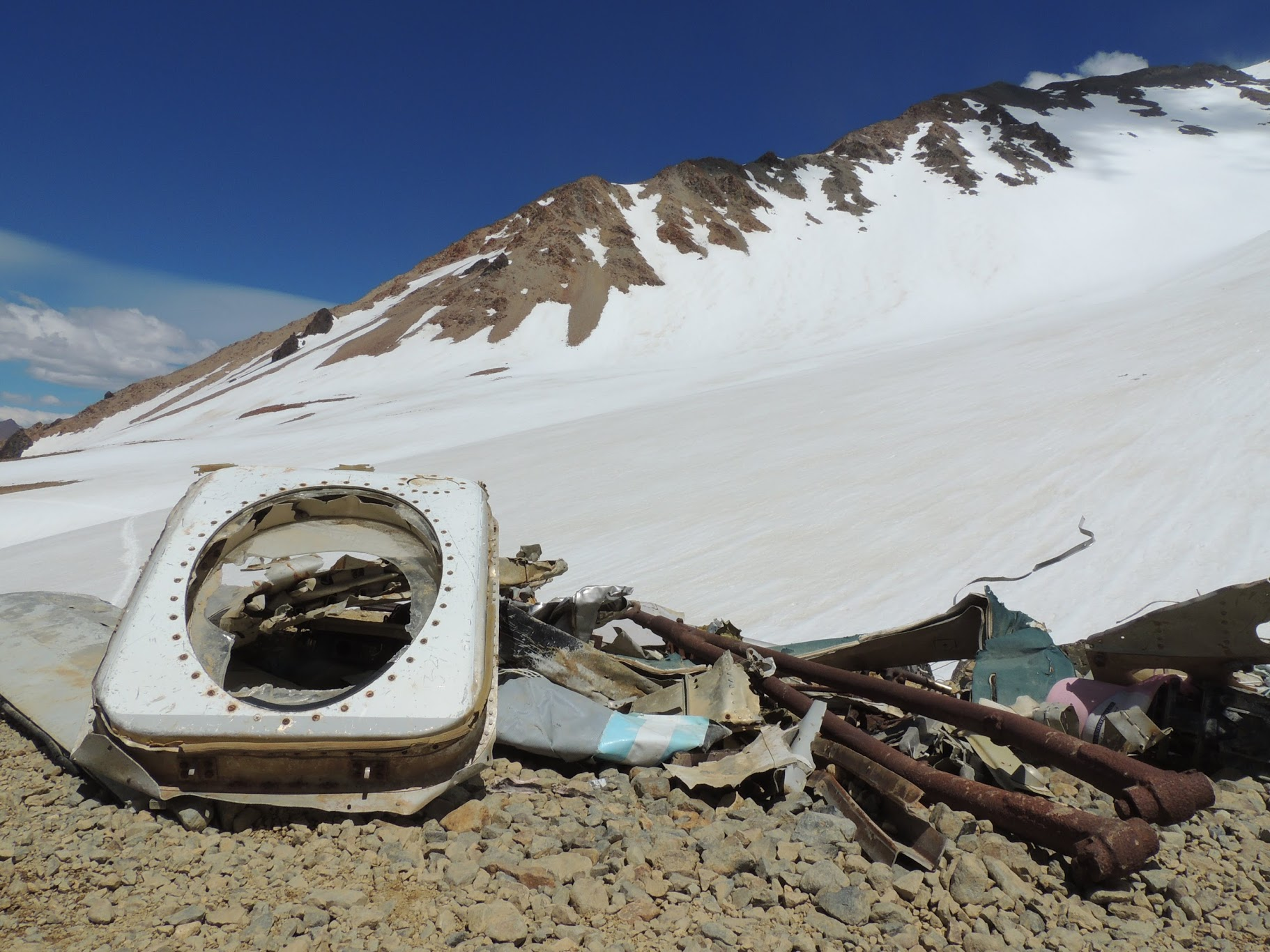
- Some wreckage from the aircraft

Accident
- Date: 13 October – 23 December 1972
- Summary: Controlled flight into terrain due to pilot error; 72-day survival
- Site: Remote Andes in Malargüe Department, Mendoza Province, Argentina (near the Chilean border); 34°45′53.5″S 70°17′06.6″W

Aircraft
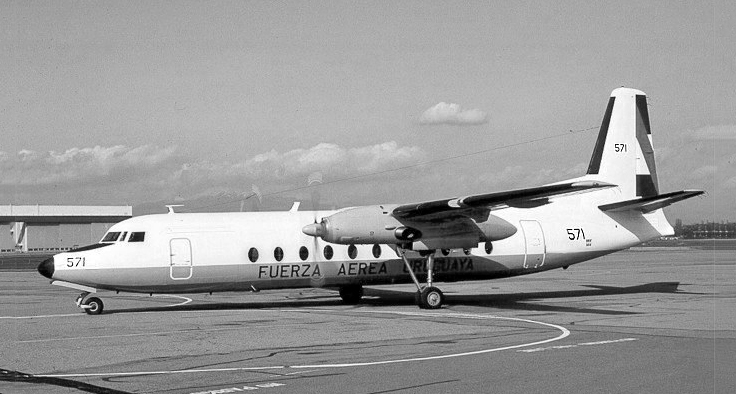
- One of the FH-227 aircraft used in the production of the 1993 film Alive, painted to appear as the aircraft involved in the accident
- Aircraft type: Fairchild Hiller FH-227D
- Operator: Uruguayan Air Force
- Registration: T-571
- Flight origin: Carrasco International Airport, Montevideo, Uruguay
- Stopover: Mendoza International Airport, Mendoza, Argentina
- Destination: Pudahuel Airport, Santiago, Chile
- Occupants: 45
- Passengers: 40
- Crew: 5
- Fatalities: 29
- Injuries: 16
- Survivors: 16

Location of the crash site in west central Argentina

Uruguayan Air Force Flight 571 was the chartered flight of a Fairchild FH-227D from Montevideo, Uruguay, to Santiago, Chile, that crashed in the Andes mountains in Argentina on 13 October 1972. The accident and subsequent survival became known as both the Andes flight disaster (Tragedia de los Andes, literally Tragedy of the Andes) and the Miracle of the Andes (Milagro de los Andes).

The inexperienced co-pilot, Lieutenant-Colonel Dante Héctor Lagurara, was piloting the aircraft at the time of the accident. He mistakenly believed the aircraft had overflown Curicó, the turning point to fly north, and began descending towards what he thought was the Pudahuel Airport in Santiago de Chile. He failed to notice that the instrument readings indicated that he was still 60–69 km (37–43 mi) east of Curicó. Lagurara, upon regaining visual flight conditions, saw the mountain and unsuccessfully tried to gain altitude. The aircraft struck a mountain ridge, shearing off both wings and the tail cone. The remaining portion of the fuselage slid down a glacier at an estimated 350 km/h (220 mph), descending 725 metres (2,379 ft) before ramming into an ice and snow mound.

The flight was carrying 45 passengers and crew, including 19 members of the Old Christians Club rugby union team, along with their families, supporters and friends. Three crew members and nine passengers died immediately and several more died soon after due to the frigid temperatures and the severity of their injuries. The crash site is located at an elevation of 3,660 metres (12,020 ft) in the remote Andes mountains of western Argentina, just east of the border with Chile. Search and rescue aircraft overflew the crash site several times during the following days, but failed to see the white fuselage against the snow. Search efforts were called off after eight days of searching.

During the 72 days following the crash, the survivors suffered from extreme hardships, including sub-zero temperatures, exposure, starvation, and an avalanche, which led to the deaths of 13 more passengers. The remaining passengers resorted to eating the flesh of those who died in order to survive. Of the 19 team members on the flight, seven of the rugby players survived the ordeal; 11 players and the team physician perished.

Convinced that they would die if they did not seek help, Nando Parrado, Antonio "Tintin" Vizintín, and Roberto Canessa, set out across the mountains on 12 December. After three days, Tintin was sent back to the fuselage so that Parrado and Canessa could make the food last during their search for help. After nine days, they spotted Sergio Catalán on horseback, thus ending their trek. On 22 and 23 December 1972, two and a half months after the crash, the remaining 14 survivors were rescued. Their survival made worldwide news.

The story of the "Andes flight disaster" is depicted in the 1993 English-language film Alive and the 2023 Spanish-language film Society of the Snow.

== Flight and accident ==
=== Flight origin ===
Members of the amateur Old Christians Club rugby union team from Montevideo, Uruguay, were scheduled to play a match in Santiago, Chile, against the Old Boys Club, an English rugby team. Club president Daniel Juan chartered a Uruguayan Air Force twin turboprop Fairchild FH-227 airplane to fly the team over the Andes mountains to Santiago. The aircraft carried 40 passengers and 5 crew members. The pilot in command, Colonel Julio César Ferradas, was an experienced Air Force pilot with 5,117 hours of flight time. He was accompanied by co-pilot Lieutenant-Colonel Dante Héctor Lagurara. There were ten extra seats, so the team invited friends and family members to accompany them. When someone cancelled at the last minute, Graziela Mariani purchased a ticket so she could attend her oldest daughter's wedding.

The aircraft departed Carrasco International Airport on 12 October 1972, but a storm front over the Andes forced them to spend the night in Mendoza, Argentina, to wait for meteorological conditions to improve. Although there is a direct westerly route from Mendoza to Santiago, the high mountains including Mount Aconcagua at 6,959 metres (22,831 ft) were near the FH-227D's service ceiling of 8,500 metres (28,000 ft). With the aircraft loaded to capacity, this direct route would have required the pilot to fly very carefully to avoid the mountains. Instead, it was customary for turboprops to fly the longer 600-kilometre (370 mi), 90-minute U-shaped route to Malargüe south of Mendoza using the A7 airway (now UW44), then west along the G-17 airway (now UB684), crossing Planchón pass and on to the Curicó radiobeacon in Chile, and from there due north to descend and land in Santiago.

The weather on 13 October affected the flight adversely. On the morning of the flight meteorological conditions over the Andes had yet to improve, but the weather was expected to improve by the early afternoon. The pilot delayed the flight and took off from Mendoza at 2:18 p.m. on Friday 13 October. He flew south towards the Malargüe radiobeacon at flight level 180 (18,000 feet or 5,500 metres). Lagurara radioed their position to Malargüe Airport to inform them that they expected to cross the 2,515 metres (8,251 ft) high Planchón pass at 3:21 p.m. Planchón pass is the air traffic control hand-off point between Chile and Argentina. After crossing the Andes into Chile the aircraft was supposed to turn north and initiate their descent into Pudahuel Airport in Santiago.

=== Crash ===
Map of Flight 571 departing Montevideo, Uruguay.

Pilot Ferradas had previously flown across the Andes 29 times. On this flight he was training co-pilot Lagurara, who was at the controls. As they flew above the Andes, clouds obscured the mountains below. The aircraft was four years old with 792 hours on the airframe.

The plane was nicknamed the "lead sled" by pilots because they considered it underpowered. The fuselage of this aircraft and others had been stretched to add a 1.83 metres (6.0 feet) section, increasing passenger capacity from 52 to 56, and making room for more cargo between the cockpit and the passenger cabin. A total of 78 FH-227 aircraft were built, 23 of which eventually crashed. The 1972 Andes flight disaster was the tenth FH-227 crash since the model was introduced in 1966.

At 3:21 p.m., shortly after crossing Planchón pass, Lagurara notified air traffic controllers that he expected to reach Curicó a minute later. While some reports state the co-pilot incorrectly estimated his position using dead reckoning, he was relying on radio navigation.

The flight time from Planchón pass to Curicó is normally 11 minutes, but only three minutes later the co-pilot radioed Santiago that they were overflying Curicó and turning due north. He requested permission from air traffic control to descend. The controller authorized the aircraft to descend to 3,500 metres (11,500 ft), unaware due to lack of radar coverage that the airplane was still flying over the Andes.

The aircraft encountered severe turbulence as it descended. Nando Parrado recalled that the plane rapidly descended several hundred feet out of the clouds. At first the rugby players joked about the turbulence until they saw the aircraft was flying abnormally close to the mountains. "That was probably the moment when the pilots saw the black ridge rising dead ahead."

Roberto Canessa later said he thought the pilot had turned due north too soon and began the descent to Santiago while the aircraft was still flying over the Andes. Then "he began to climb, until the plane was nearly vertical and it began to stall and shake." The aircraft's ground collision alarm sounded and scared all the passengers.

The pilots applied maximum power to gain altitude and climb over the 4,200 metres (13,800 ft) high southern ridge of the glacier's cirque. Witness accounts and evidence at the scene indicated the plane struck the mountain two or three times.

The co-pilot was able to bring the aircraft nose over the ridge, but at 3:34 p.m., the lower part of the tail-cone may have clipped the ridge at 4,200 metres (13,800 ft). The next collision severed the right wing. Some evidence indicates it was thrown back with such force that it may have been the event that tore off the tail-cone. When the tail-cone was sheared off, it took with it the rear part of the aircraft, including two rows of seats, the galley, baggage hold, vertical stabilizer and horizontal stabilizer, leaving a gaping hole in the rear. Three passengers, the navigator and the flight attendant were lost with the tail section.

The aircraft's momentum and its remaining engine carried it forward and upward until a rock outcropping at 4,400 metres (14,400 ft) tore off the left wing. Its propeller sliced through the fuselage. Two more passengers fell out of the gaping hole in the rear. The fuselage crashed onto the snow and careened 725 metres (2,379 ft) down the steep slope of the glacier at 350 km/h (220 mph), rammed into a snow bank and came to a sudden stop. The seats broke loose from the floor and were thrown against the forward bulkhead of the fuselage. The impact crushed the cockpit, pinning both pilots against the instrument panel, killing Ferradas immediately.

The official investigation concluded that the crash was caused by controlled flight into terrain due to pilot error.

The plane's fuselage came to rest in the cirque of the Glaciar de las Lágrimas or Glacier of Tears at 34°45′53.5″S 70°17′06.6″W at an elevation of 3,675 metres (12,057 ft), in the Malargüe Department in the Mendoza Province of Argentina. The glacier lies between the 5,169 metres (16,959 ft) high Mount Sosneado and the 4,280 metres (14,040 ft) high Tinguiririca volcano, straddling the remote mountainous border between Chile and Argentina. It is south of a 4,650 metres (15,260 ft) high mountain (later named Mount Seler by Nando Parrado in honor of his father). Two survivors later climbed the peak before descending into Chile to get help. The aircraft came to rest 80 km (50 mi) to the east of its planned route.

== Aftermath ==
Of the 45 people aboard the aircraft, three passengers and two crew members in the rear section of the fuselage died when the tail cone was ripped from the fuselage: Lt. Ramón Saúl Martínez (navigator), Ovidio Ramírez (steward), Gaston Costemalle, Alexis Hounié and Guido Magri. A few seconds later Daniel Shaw and Carlos Valeta also fell out of the rear fuselage, killing Shaw. Valeta survived the fall but fell into deep snow and asphyxiated while stumbling down the snow-covered glacier. His body was found by fellow passengers on 14 December.

When the fuselage slammed into the snow bank, the remaining seats broke loose from the floor, compressing the passengers against the forward bulkheads. Team physician Dr. Francisco Nicola, his wife Esther Nicola, Eugenia Parrado, and Fernando Vazquez were killed. Pilot Ferradas died instantly when the nose gear compressed the instrument panel against his chest and forced his head out of the windshield. Co-pilot Lagurara was critically injured and trapped in the crushed cockpit. He asked one of the passengers to find his pistol and shoot him, but the passengers refused. He died the following day.

Thirty-three passengers and crew survived the first day, although many were critically or seriously injured. Their wounds included broken legs resulting from the impact of the seats against the forward bulkhead. Both of Arturo Nogueira's legs were broken in several places. None of the passengers with compound fractures survived. Canessa and Gustavo Zerbino, both medical students, quickly triaged the wounded and first treated those they could help most. Nando Parrado had a skull fracture, and he remained unconscious for three days, and his sister, Susana, was badly injured and semi-conscious. Graziela Mariani's legs were broken and trapped by twisted seats. Enrique Platero had a piece of metal stuck in his abdomen that, when removed, brought a few inches of intestine with it. He nonetheless immediately began helping others.

=== Unsuccessful air search ===
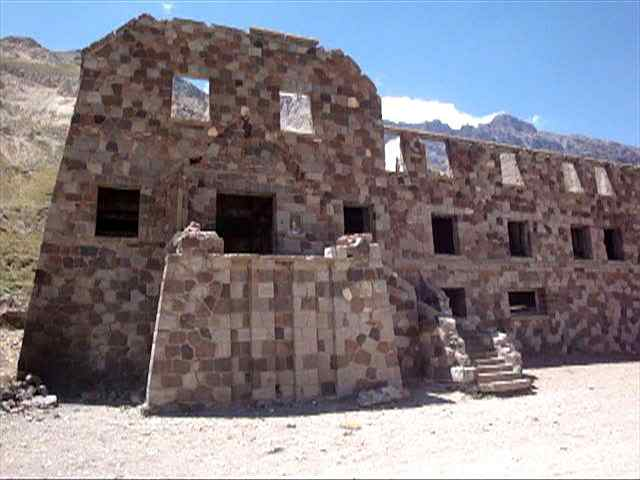
Unknown to the survivors, the abandoned summer resort Hotel Termas el Sosneado was only 20 km (12 mi) due east from the crash site.

The Chilean Air Search and Rescue Service (SARS) was notified within the hour that the flight was unaccounted for. Four aircraft began to search for the aircraft based on its last reported position on the Curicó corridor from Angostura to Santiago. News of the missing flight reached Uruguayan media around 6:00 p.m. that evening. When SARS officials could not locate the crash, they listened to recordings of the radio transmissions and concluded the aircraft must have crashed in one of the most remote and inaccessible areas of the Andes. They asked the Andes Rescue Group of Chile (CSA) for assistance. Unbeknownst to the passengers or the search teams, the flight had crashed in Argentina even before crossing into Chile, about 20 km (12 mi) from the Hotel Termas el Sosneado, an abandoned hot springs resort.

On the second day, eleven aircraft from Argentina, Chile, and Uruguay searched for the missing flight. The search area covered the accident location, and a few aircraft even overflew the crash site. The survivors tried to use lipstick recovered from their luggage to write an SOS message on the roof of the fuselage, but did not have enough lipstick to make large letters that could be seen from the air by rescuers. They also used luggage to fashion a cross on the snow, but it failed to attract the attention of the rescuers. On the fourth day, the survivors saw aircraft overfly the crash site, but the rescuers were unable to spot the white fuselage against the snow.

The harsh conditions gave the rescuers little hope that they would find anyone alive, so rescue efforts were cancelled after eight days of searching, on 21 October.

=== First week of survival ===
Another five passengers and crew died between the first night and the next day: co-pilot Lagurara, Francisco Abal, Graziela Mariani, Felipe Maquirriain, and Julio Martinez-Lamas.

The remaining 28 survivors removed the broken seats and other debris to fashion the fuselage into a crude shelter 2.5 by 3 metres (8 ft × 10 ft) small. They used luggage, seats, and snow to close off the rear end of the fuselage. Fito Strauch devised a solar-powered water collector with sheet metal he retrieved from under the seats. To prevent snow blindness, he also improvised sunglasses by cutting the green plastic sun visors in the cockpit and sewing the pieces to bra straps with electrical wire. They used the woolen seat covers to keep warm and seat cushions as snowshoes. The captain of the rugby team, Marcelo Perez, took on a leadership role.

After three days, Parrado regained consciousness only to learn that his mother had died and his 19-year-old sister Susana was severely injured. He tried to keep his sister alive, but on the ninth day, she too died from her injuries. The remaining 27 survivors had a hard time during the nights when temperatures plunged to −30 °C (−22 °F). They all had lived their entire lives by the sea and some had never even seen snow before the crash. None had any high-elevation survival training or experience. They lacked medical supplies, cold-weather clothing, equipment, and food. They only had three pairs of sunglasses among themselves to prevent snow blindness.

They found a small AM transistor radio jammed between two aircraft seats. Roy Harley improvised a long antenna using electrical wire from the plane and on the eleventh day on the mountain heard the news that their search had been called off. Piers Paul Read's book Alive: The Story of the Andes Survivors describes how they reacted:

The others who had clustered around Roy, upon hearing the news, began to sob and pray, all except [Nando] Parrado, who looked calmly up at the mountains which rose to the west. Gustavo [Coco] Nicolich came out of the aircraft and, seeing their faces, knew what they had heard... [Nicolich] climbed through the hole in the wall of suitcases and rugby shirts, crouched at the mouth of the dim tunnel, and looked at the mournful faces looking at him. "Hey boys," he shouted, "there's some good news we just heard on the radio! They've called off the search!" Inside the crowded aircraft, there was silence. As the hopelessness of their predicament enveloped them, they wept. "Why the hell is that good news?" Paez shouted angrily at Nicolich. "Because it means," [Nicolich] said, "that we're going to get out of here on our own." The courage of this one man prevented a flood of total despair from overcoming the group.

=== Resorting to survival cannibalism ===
The survivors had very little food. They found eight chocolate bars, three small jars of jam, a tin of mussels, a tin of almonds, a few dates, some candy, dried plums, and several bottles of wine. They rationed the meager supply of food, but it lasted only a week. Parrado ate a single chocolate-covered peanut over three days. Far above the timber line, there was no vegetation and no animals. When the food ran out, they ate the cotton stuffing from the seats and leather from belts and shoes, which made them sick.

Knowing that rescue efforts had been called off and facing certain death from starvation, the survivors gave each other permission to use their bodies for food in case they died. Left with no alternative, the survivors consumed the bodies of their deceased friends and relatives. Canessa later described the decision to eat the dead:

Our common goal was to survive, but what we lacked was food. We had long since run out of the meager pickings we'd found on the plane, and there was no vegetation or animal life to be found. After just a few days, we had the sensation that our own bodies were consuming themselves just to remain alive. Before long we would become too weak to recover from starvation.

We knew the answer, but the answer was just too terrifying to contemplate.

The bodies of our friends and teammates preserved outside in the snow and ice contained the vital, life-preserving proteins that would keep us alive. But could we do it? For a long time, we agonized. I went out in the snow and prayed to God for guidance. Without His consent, I felt I would be violating the memory of my friends, that I would be stealing their souls.

We wondered whether we were going mad to even contemplate such a deed. Had we turned into brute savages? Or was this the only alternative for us to survive? Truly, we were pushing the limits of our fear.

The group survived by eating the bodies of their dead comrades. This decision was not taken lightly, as most of the dead were classmates, close friends, or relatives. Canessa cut the meat with a shard of broken windshield glass. He set the example by swallowing the first matchstick-sized lump of human flesh. Several others followed suit over the next few days, but a few still kept refusing to eat it.

In his memoir, Miracle in the Andes: 72 Days on the Mountain and My Long Trek Home (2006), Parrado wrote about this decision:

At high altitude, the body's caloric needs are astronomical. We were seriously starving with no hope of finding food, but our hunger soon grew so voracious that we searched anyway. Again and again, we scoured the fuselage in search of crumbs and morsels. We tried to eat strips of leather torn from pieces of luggage, though we knew that the chemicals they'd been treated with would do us more harm than good. We ripped open seat cushions, hoping to find straw, but found only inedible upholstery foam. Again and again, I came to the same conclusion: Unless we wanted to eat the clothes we were wearing, there was nothing here [to eat] but aluminum, plastic, ice, and rock.

Parrado protected the bodies of his mother and sister so they would not be eaten. They dried the meat from the bodies in the sun to make it easier to eat. At first, they were so disgusted by the experience that they could only eat skin, muscle and fat, but in the end, they also ate hearts, lungs, and even brains.

All of the passengers were Roman Catholic. Some feared eating human flesh would lead to eternal damnation. According to Read, some survivors compared it to the Eucharist, i.e., the conversion of bread and wine into the Body and the Blood of Jesus Christ. Others cited John 15:13 from the Bible to justify it: "No man hath greater love than this: That he lay down his life for his friends."

All who survived the ordeal decided to eat human flesh, though not without serious reservations. Some, including Coche Inciarte and Numa Turcatti, only ate the bare minimum necessary for survival, due to their deep revulsion. Javier Methol and his wife Liliana, the only surviving female passenger at the time, were the last to eat human flesh. Liliana had very strong religious convictions against doing so and only reluctantly agreed to eat after someone suggested that doing so was akin to receiving the Holy Communion.

=== Avalanche ===
Close to midnight on 29 October and sixteen days after the crash, an avalanche struck the fuselage while the survivors were asleep, almost filling the fuselage with snow and ice and smothering eight people to death: Enrique Platero, Liliana Methol, Gustavo Nicolich, Daniel Maspons, Juan Menendez, Diego Storm, Carlos Roque and Marcelo Perez. The death of Perez, rugby team captain and leader of the survivors, along with the loss of Liliana Methol, who had nursed many injured passengers "like a mother and a saint", were particularly difficult to bear for the remaining survivors. At 34 years old and the mother of four children, Methol was the last of the five female passengers to perish; the survivors made an agreement that her body would not be touched.

The avalanche completely buried the fuselage, filling it to within 1 metre (3 ft) of the ceiling. The survivors trapped inside quickly realized they would soon run out of air. Parrado took a metal pole from the luggage racks and used it to pry open one of the cockpit windscreens and to poke a hole through the snow for fresh air. On the morning of 31 October they were able to dig an exit tunnel with considerable difficulty from the cockpit to the surface, only to be faced with a blizzard that made them crawl back into the fuselage. Despite the other extreme hardships that the group endured on the mountain, survivor José Luis Inciarte referred to the avalanche as the worst part of the entire 72-day ordeal.

The blizzard raged furiously for three days, trapping the survivors together with the bodies of the deceased inside the snow-filled fuselage. On the third day, they began to eat the flesh of their newly deceased friends. Parrado later said: "It was soft and greasy, streaked with blood and bits of wet cartilage. I gagged hard when I placed it in my mouth."

With Perez dead, Daniel Fernández and cousins Eduardo and Fito Strauch assumed the leadership of the group. They took over harvesting the flesh from the deceased and distributing it for others to eat.

Before the avalanche, a few survivors insisted the only way to survive would be to climb over the mountains to get help. Because the co-pilot kept repeating before he died that the aircraft had overflown Curicó, the survivors believed the Chilean countryside was closest at only a few kilometres to the west. Unbeknownst to them, they had crashed deep in the Andes mountain range, and the Chilean countryside was a distant 89 km (55 mi) to the west. As the days passed, with the onset of summer, the temperature rose, and the snow that had buried the fuselage began to melt away.

=== Exploring the area surrounding the crash site ===
In the first few weeks after the crash, some survivors set out on brief expeditions to explore the immediate vicinity of the aircraft but they found that altitude sickness, dehydration, snow blindness, malnourishment and the extreme night-time cold made it impossible to travel any significant distance from the crash site.

The decision was made for a few survivors to leave on an expedition to get help. Some survivors were determined to join the expedition team, including Canessa (one of the two medical students), but other survivors were less willing to do so or were unsure of their ability to stand up to such a physically demanding ordeal. Numa Turcatti and Antonio Vizintín were selected to accompany Canessa and Parrado. Turcatti's wounded leg had become infected, so he was unable to join the expedition. Canessa, Parrado, and Vizintín were among the most physically fit and were allocated larger rations of meat to build their strength for the expedition and the warmest clothes to withstand the nighttime cold they would have to face on the mountain. They were also excused from carrying out the daily tasks essential to the group's survival so they could focus on training for the upcoming ordeal. At Canessa's urging, they waited the better part of a week for temperatures to increase.

The expedition aimed to head west to Chile, but the large mountain on the western rim of the glacier's cirque presented a formidable obstacle, so instead the team of three decided to head east. They hoped the valley would make a U-turn to the west that would lead them to Chile. On 15 November, after several hours of walking 1.6 km (1 mi) downhill east of the fuselage, they found the tail section of the aircraft with the galley mostly intact. They also found luggage with a box of chocolates, three meat patties, a bottle of rum, bottles of Coca-Cola, cigarettes, extra clothes, comic books, some medicine, and, most importantly, the aircraft's batteries. They decided to seek shelter for the night inside the tail section, started a fire to stay warm, and stayed up late reading comic books.

The next morning, they continued descending to the east, but on the second night of the expedition, they nearly froze to death. They decided to return to the tail section and bring the batteries to the fuselage. They hoped they could power the radio and make an SOS call to Santiago for help.

=== Radio inoperative ===
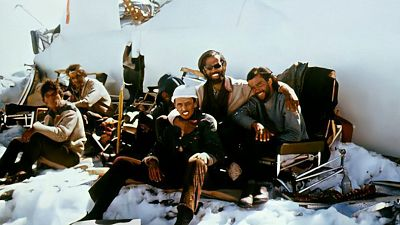
From left to right: Álvaro Mangino, Carlitos Páez, Numa Turcatti, Daniel Fernandez, Coche Inciarte, Pancho Delgado

Upon returning to the tail, the trio found that the 24-kilogram (53 lb) batteries were far too heavy to carry back to the fuselage, an uphill climb in the deep snow from the tail section. Instead, they decided it would be better to return to the fuselage, disconnect the radio, and bring it back to the tail section where the batteries were. Roy Harley used his knowledge as an amateur electronics enthusiast to assist in the process. Unbeknownst to them, the aircraft's avionics required 115 Volt AC power while the battery from the tail section only supplied 24 Volt DC, thus dooming their plan from the start.

They gave up after several days of not being able to make the radio work and returned to the fuselage, realizing they would have to climb out of the mountains on their own terms to get help if they were to have any chance of surviving. Along the way, they were struck by another blizzard. Harley lost faith and stopped, expecting to die, but Parrado helped him back to the fuselage.

=== Last three deaths ===
Arturo Nogueira died on 15 November, and three days later, Rafael Echavarren also died, both from their infected wounds. Numa Turcatti, whose extreme revulsion against eating human flesh dramatically accelerated his physical decline, died on day 60 (11 December). He was the last victim of the crash. The remaining survivors knew they would all die if they did not leave soon to get help. The survivors heard on the transistor radio that the Uruguayan Air Force had resumed searching for them.

== Expedition to Chile to get help ==
The route out. The dotted green line follows Parrado and Canessa's route westward, with Mount Seler located where it crosses with the dotted red line. They trekked about 61 km (38 mi) over 10 days.

=== Making a sleeping bag ===
The remaining survivors came to the realization that the only way out was to climb over the mountains on the western rim of the glacier's cirque, and that such a climb was impossible unless they found a way to survive the freezing night-time temperatures they would find at elevation. They fashioned a sleeping bag with insulation from the rear of the fuselage, electrical wire and the waterproof fabric that covered the plane's air conditioning unit. Parrado described in his book, Miracle in the Andes: 72 Days on the Mountain and My Long Trek Home, how they came up with the idea of making a sleeping bag:

The second challenge would be to protect ourselves from exposure, especially after sundown. At this time of year, we could expect daytime temperatures well above freezing, but the nights were still cold enough to kill us, and we knew now that we couldn't expect to find shelter on the open slopes.

We needed a way to survive the long nights without freezing and the quilted insulation we'd taken from the tail section gave us our solution. As we brainstormed about the upcoming trip, we realized we could sew the patches together to create a large warm quilt. Then we realized that by folding the quilt in half and stitching the edges together, we could create an insulated sleeping bag large enough for the three of us to sleep in. With the heat of our three bodies trapped by the insulation, we might be able to survive even the coldest nights.

Carlitos [Páez] took on the challenge. His mother had taught him to sew when he was a boy and with needles and thread from the sewing kit he found in his mother's vanity case, he began to work. To speed up progress, Carlitos taught others to sew, and we all took our turns. Coche [Inciarte], Gustavo [Zerbino], and Fito [Strauch] turned out to be our best and fastest tailors.

Turcatti died after the sleeping bag was completed. Canessa was still hesitant about the trip. While the remaining survivors encouraged Parrado to go on the expedition, no one actually volunteered to go with him. Parrado finally persuaded Canessa it was time to set out and together with Vizintín, the three men began climbing the mountain on 12 December.

=== Climbing the western peak ===
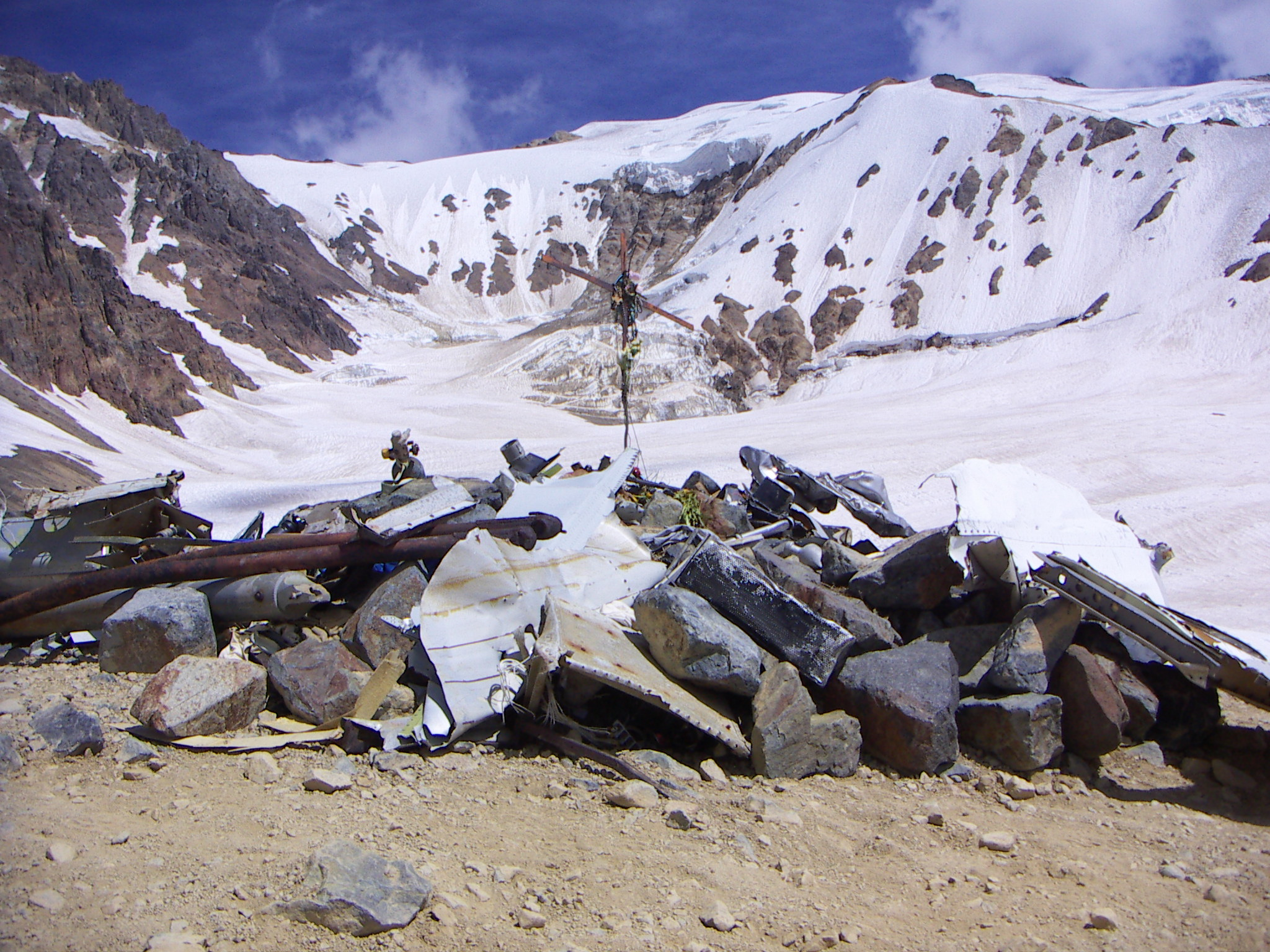
The survivors' expedition had to climb the western rim of the glacier cirque before descending into Chile. Santuario y monumento de la tragedia de Andes, the rock pile memorializing the victims and survivors is in the foreground.

Based on the aircraft's broken altimeter, they thought they were at 2,100 metres (7,000 ft), when they were actually at 3,664 metres (12,020 ft). They also believed, based on the co-pilot's dying words, that they had overflown Curicó, near the western edge of the Andes. They thought the closest help lay due west. As a result, they only brought along a three-day supply of meat for the three of them. Parrado wore three pairs of jeans, three sweaters over a polo shirt and four pairs of socks wrapped in a plastic shopping bag.

They had no rock climbing gear, no area map, no compass and no climbing experience. On 12 December 1972, Parrado, Canessa and Vizintín began climbing out of the glacier at an elevation of 3,664 metres (12,020 ft). Instead of climbing the somewhat lower ridge to the south, they headed straight up the steep 30–60º headwall slope of the mountain ridge. They thought they could climb the ridge top in a day. Parrado took the lead with the other two often asking him to slow down. The thin oxygen-poor air made climbing difficult. During certain sections of the climb, they sank up to their hips in the summer-softened snow.

The improvised sleeping bag they shared kept them alive through the nights. In the documentary film Stranded, Canessa described how on the first night they had difficulty finding level ground to place the sleeping bag on. A blizzard blew fiercely and they finally found a rocky ledge at the edge of a cliff level enough for the sleeping bag. Canessa said it was the worst night of his life. The climb was slow and tedious. The survivors at the base camp watched them climb for three long days.

On 13 December, their second day climbing the mountain, Canessa thought he saw a line along the valley to the east, and believed it to be a road. He tried to persuade Parrado to head in that direction, but Parrado thought the idea was crazy and would not consider it.

=== Reaching the ridge top ===
On the third morning after starting out, Canessa stayed back at the camp site. Vizintín and Parrado reached the base of a nearly vertical 100-metre (330 ft) wall, covered with snow and ice. Parrado used a stick he brought along to carve steps in the ice wall. He reached the 4,503-metre (14,774 ft) ridge before Vizintín. Believing he would see the green valleys of Chile to the west, he was stunned when he was faced with seemingly unending snow-capped mountain peaks extending in every direction. Vizintín and Parrado descended and rejoined Canessa as the sun set. They sipped cognac from a bottle they had found in the tail section of the aircraft and Parrado said: "Roberto, can you imagine how beautiful this would be if we were not walking dead?"

They realized their rescue-seeking expedition was going to take much longer than they had anticipated. They decided that Vizintín should return to base camp so the other two might have enough food to complete their journey. Vizintín's return was entirely downhill and he used an aircraft seat as a makeshift sleigh to make it back down to base camp within the hour.

From their bivouac spot the night before, Parrado and Canessa took three hours to climb to the 4,503 metres (14,774 ft) ridge. When they reached the top and only saw snow-capped mountains in every direction, Canessa thought, "We're dead!" Parrado told Canessa, "We may be walking to our deaths, but I would rather walk to meet my death than wait for it to come to me." Canessa agreed: "You and I are friends, Nando. We have been through so much. Now let's go die together." Parrado saw two lower peaks near the western horizon that were clear of snow, with the valley at the foot of their mountain slowly winding its way towards those peaks. Parrado was sure the valley was the way out of the mountains and refused to give up hope. They followed the ridge towards the valley for a considerable distance as they descended.

=== Finding help ===
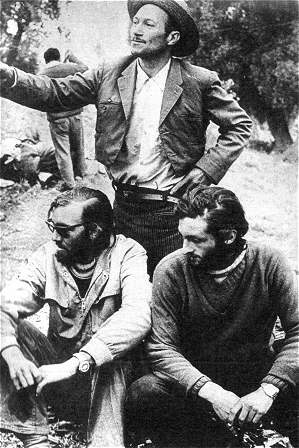
Nando Parrado and Roberto Canessa (sitting) with Chilean arriero Sergio Catalán

Parrado and Canessa hiked down for seven more days into Chile. They reached the narrow valley that Parrado had seen from the top of the mountain, finding a river, and eventually the end of the snowline. They continued descending along the river, gradually seeing more signs of human life: first, an empty soup can, and finally, on the ninth day, some cows.

Canessa was exhausted and unable to keep walking so they rested for the evening. As they gathered wood for a fire, they saw three men on horseback on the other side of the river. Parrado called out to them but the noise of the river made it impossible to communicate. One of the men across the river saw Parrado and Canessa and shouted back: "Tomorrow!" The next day the man returned, scribbled a note, tied the note with a pencil to a stone and threw the stone across the river to Parrado. Parrado replied:

Vengo de un avión que se estrelló en las montañas. Soy uruguayo. Hace 10 días que estamos caminando. Tengo un amigo herido arriba. En el avión quedan 14 personas heridas. Tenemos que salir rápido de aquí y no sabemos cómo. No tenemos comida. Estamos muy débiles. ¿Cuándo nos van a buscar arriba? Por favor, no podemos ni caminar. ¿Dónde estamos?
English: I come from an airplane that crashed in the mountains. I am Uruguayan. We have been walking for 10 days. I have a wounded friend up there. In the plane there are still 14 injured people. We need to get out of here quickly and we don't know how to. We don't have any food. We are very weak. When are you going to come to get us? Please, we can't even walk. Where are we?

Sergio Catalán, a Chilean arriero, read the note and made signs that he understood. He threw a loaf of bread to the two men across the river and went for help, riding to Puente Negro, a small town which was "eight hours away on horseback, and still more time on real roads." He would return with ten carbineers.

In the meantime, Parrado and Canessa arrived on horseback to a cabin at Los Maitenes where they were fed and allowed to rest. Canessa had lost half of his body weight since the plane crash and weighed 44 kilograms (97 lb). In an interview with Nando Parrado, the British media outlet The Guardian states that Parrado and Canessa hiked approximately 37 miles (60 km) during their 10 day trek. Parrado notes that by the end, "Roberto was very weak. He gave everything that he had."

=== Helicopter rescue ===
When the news broke out that survivors had emerged from the crash of Uruguayan Air Force Flight 571, the story of their 72-day ordeal drew international attention. The day after they were found while still in Los Maitenes, Parrado and Canessa faced "a column of men in urban clothes, panting, stumbling, bowed under the weight of briefcases," who were reporters from major news outlets including the BBC and El Mercurio, seeking interviews about their survival.

The Chilean Air Force provided three Bell UH-1 helicopters to assist with the rescue. They flew in heavy cloud cover under instrument conditions to Los Maitenes, where the Army interviewed Parrado and Canessa. Once the fog lifted at noon, Parrado guided the helicopters to the crash site in Argentina with the pilot's map he had brought with him. One of the helicopters remained behind as backup. The pilots were astounded at the difficult terrain the two men had crossed to get help.

The two helicopters arrived at the crash site on the afternoon of 22 December 1972. The steep terrain only permitted the pilot to touch down with a single skid. Due to the altitude and weight limits, the two helicopters were able to take only half of the survivors. Four of the rescuers volunteered to stay behind with the remaining eight survivors for their last night on the mountain. The second flight of helicopters arrived the following morning at daybreak. The last remaining survivors were rescued on 23 December 1972, more than two and a half months after the crash. The survivors were taken to hospitals in Santiago for evaluation and were treated for altitude sickness, dehydration, frostbite, broken bones, scurvy and malnutrition.

Normally the search and rescue team would have also recovered the remains of the dead for burial. However, because recovery would have had to be made from Argentine soil, the Chilean rescuers decided to leave the bodies behind until Argentine authorities decided how to proceed. The Chilean military photographed the bodies and mapped the crash site before returning to Chile.

== Timeline ==
Day	Date	Events and deaths	Dead	Missing	Alive
Day 0	12 October (Thu)	Departed Montevideo, Uruguay			45
Day 1	13 October (Fri)	Departed Mendoza, Argentina 2:18 p.m. Crashed at 3:34 p.m. Fell from aircraft, missing: Gastón Costemalle* (law student); Alexis Hounié* (veterinary student); Guido Magri* (agronomy student); Joaquín Ramírez (flight attendant); Ramón Martínez (navigator); Daniel Shaw* (cattle rancher); Carlos Valeta (prep student); Died in crash or soon thereafter: Colonel Julio César Ferradas (pilot); Dr. Francisco Nicola (team physician); Esther Horta Pérez de Nicola (wife of team physician); Eugenia Dolgay Diedug de Parrado (Fernando "Nando" and Susana Parrado's mother); Fernándo Vázquez (business student)	5	7	33
Day 2	14 October (Sat)	Died during first night: Francisco "Panchito" Abal*; Felipe Maquirriain (literature student); Julio Martínez-Lamas* (engineering student); Lt. Col. Dante Héctor Lagurara (co-pilot); Graziela Augusto Gumila de Mariani (wedding guest)	10	7	28
Day 9	21 October (Sat)	Died: Susana Parrado (Fernando "Nando" Parrado's sister)	11	7	27
Day 12	24 October (Tue)	Found deceased: Gastón Costemalle*; Alexis Hounié*; Guido Magri*; Joaquín Ramírez; Ramón Martínez	16	2	27
Day 17	29 October (Sun)	Avalanche kills eight: Sgt. Carlos Roque (aircraft mechanic); Daniel Maspons*; Juan Carlos Menéndez (law student); Liliana Navarro Petraglia de Methol (wife of Javier Methol); Gustavo "Coco" Nicolich* (veterinary student); Marcelo Pérez* (rugby team captain); Enrique Platero* (farming student); Diego Storm (medical student)	24	2	19
Day 34	15 November (Wed)	Died: Arturo Nogueira* (cartography student)	25	2	18
Day 37	18 November (Sat)	Died: Rafael Echavarren (dairy farming student)	26	2	17
Day 60	11 December (Mon)	Died: Numa Turcatti (law student)	27	2	16
Day 61	12 December (Tues)	Parrado, Canessa and Vizintin set off on final expedition to the west to find help	27	2	16
Day 62	13 December (Wed)	Found deceased: Daniel Shaw*	28	1	16
Day 63	14 December (Thu)	Found deceased: Carlos Valeta	29		16
Day 64	15 December (Fri)	Antonio Vizintin returns to the fuselage	29		16
Day 69	20 December (Wed)	Parrado and Canessa encounter Sergio Catalán	29		16
Day 70	21 December (Thu)	Fernando "Nando" Parrado* and Roberto Canessa* rescued	29		16
Day 71	22 December (Fri)	6 people rescued: José Pedro Algorta; Daniel Fernández; José "Coche" Luis Inciarte; Álvaro Mangino; Carlos Páez Rodríguez*; Eduardo Strauch*	29		16
Day 72	23 December (Sat)	8 people rescued: Alfredo "Pancho" Delgado; Roberto "Bobby" François*; Roy Harley*; Javier Methol; Ramón "Moncho" Sabella; Adolfo "Fito" Strauch; Antonio "Tintin" Vizintín*; Gustavo Zerbino*	29		16

== Survivors ==
- Pedro Algorta (economics student)
- Roberto Canessa* (medical student)
- Alfredo "Pancho" Delgado (law student)
- Daniel Fernández (Strauch)† (agronomy student)
- Roberto "Bobby" François*
- Roy Harley* (engineering student)
- José "Coche" Luis Inciarte†
- Álvaro Mangino†
- Javier Methol†
- Nando Parrado*
- Carlos Páez Rodríguez*
- Ramón "Moncho" Sabella
- Adolfo "Fito" Strauch
- Eduardo Strauch*
- Antonio "Tintin" Vizintín*
- Gustavo Zerbino* (medical student)

* Rugby player
† Survivors who are now deceased

== Aftermath ==
The survivors told the press they had managed to stay alive eating cheese and other food items they had brought with them, and after these ran out, local vegetation. They planned to discuss the actual details of how they survived, including the decision to eat the flesh of those who died, first only with their families. False rumors circulated in Montevideo saying they had killed some of the survivors for food. On 23 December, news reports of cannibalism were published worldwide, except in Uruguay. On 26 December, two pictures taken by members of Cuerpo de Socorro Andino (Andean Relief Corps) of a half-eaten human leg were printed on the front page of two Chilean newspapers, El Mercurio and La Tercera de la Hora, who reported that the survivors had resorted to eating the flesh of those who died in order to survive.

The survivors held a press conference on 28 December at the Stella Maris College in Montevideo to tell the story of their 72-day ordeal. Alfredo Delgado acted as the spokesman for the survivors. He compared their actions to that of Jesus at the Last Supper, during which he gave his disciples the Eucharist. The survivors initially faced a backlash of public opinion, but after they explained the pact the survivors had made among themselves to sacrifice their flesh in case of death to help the others survive, the outcry subsided and their families became more understanding. A Roman Catholic priest heard the survivors' confessions and reassured them they were not going to be damned for it, given the in extremis nature of their survival situation. The news of their survival, and what they were forced to resort to, drew world-wide attention and developed into a media circus. Pope Paul VI sent a telegram to the survivors sanctioning the consumption.

=== Burial of the remains at the crash site ===
The Argentine authorities and the victims' families decided to bury the remains of the victims at the crash site in a common grave. Thirteen bodies were whole while another 15 consisted only of skeletal remains. Twelve men and a Chilean priest were taken to the crash site on 18 January 1973. Family members were not allowed to attend. They dug a grave 400 to 800 m (1/4 to 1/2 mi) from the aircraft fuselage at a location they deemed protected from avalanches. They built a simple stone altar near the grave and placed an orange iron cross on its top. They also made a memorial out of a pile of rocks they gathered and placed a plaque on it with the inscription:

EL MUNDO A SUS HERMANOS URUGUAYOS
CERCA, OH DIOS DE TI
[English: The world to its Uruguayan brothers
Close, oh God, to you]

They doused the remains of aircraft wreckage with gasoline and set it on fire. Eduardo Strauch later wrote in his book Out of the Silence that the bottom half of the fuselage, covered in snow and thus spared by the fire, was still there when he returned in 1995.

Ricardo Echavarren, the father of one of the victims, received word from a survivor that his son had wished to be buried at home. Unable to obtain official permission from Argentine authorities to retrieve his son's body, Echavarren hired guides and mounted an illegal expedition of his own. He had arranged with the priest who had buried his son to mark the body bag with his son's remains. Upon returning to the abandoned Hotel Termas El Sosneado, he was arrested for grave robbery. A federal judge and the local mayor interceded to secure his release and Echavarren was later authorized to make funeral arrangements for his son.

== Legacy ==
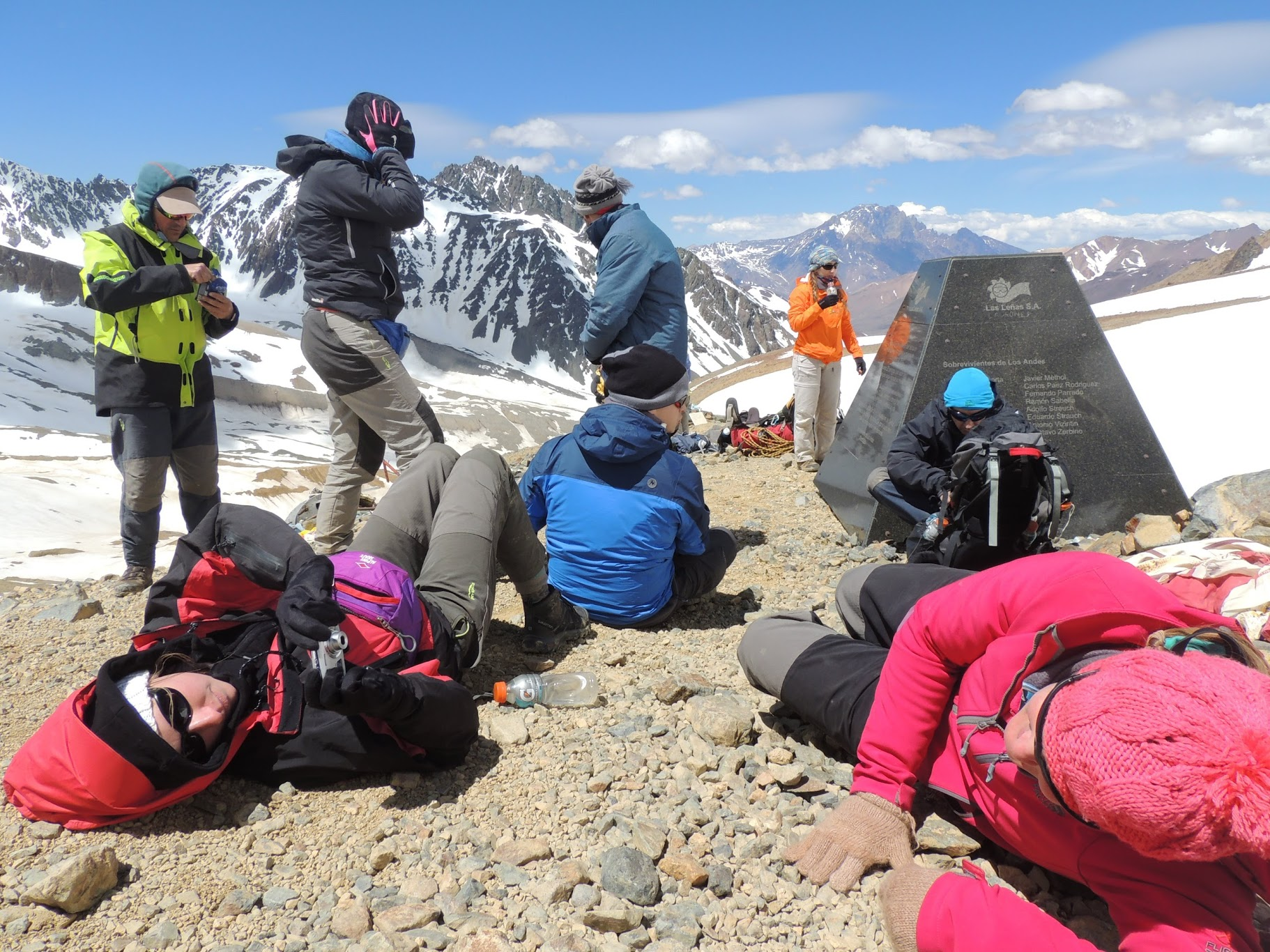
Hikers at the memorial dedicated to crash victims and survivors

The survivors' courage under life-threatening conditions has been described as "a beacon of hope to [their] generation, showing what can be accomplished with persistence and determination in the face of unsurpassable odds when we set our minds to attain a common goal." The incident was later analyzed in a case study by German researchers, where accounts from the survivors were used to demonstrate how building communities and interacting with others could help project members develop resilience in the face of adversity.

The themes of resilience, perseverance, community-building, and leadership present in the stories of the survivors have also made the 1972 Andes plane crash notable for challenging, and being the opposite of, dystopian fictional tales such as Lord of the Flies and Yellowjackets. In a 2024 op-ed on the 2023 film, Society of the Snow, two of the survivors, Roberto Canessa and Gustavo Zerbino, state that they "and others have been telling our story for half a century, but the filmmaker J. A. Bayona has captured it in ways that we find inspiring and fresh all over again. In many respects, Society of the Snow violates a well-worn tenet of all drama: it is a film free of an antagonist. Yes, it is a classic man-versus-nature narrative, but there is no evil present in the film. It is a film free of cynicism, brimming with pure humanity, accessible to a wide spectrum of viewers. It is a film that has broken the boundaries of language with the universal message that everyone has the immeasurable potential to rise to the occasion, thanks, in great part, to the alliances we can and should forge as we share this planet together." Pablo Vierci also states in his 2008 book Society of the Snow (the basis for Bayona's film) that "contrary to what apocalyptic fiction predicts, the human mob, the 'every man for himself' scenario, did not happen here. Instead what arose was a spirit of harmony and solidarity, where the most important thing was to take care of those who were most injured."

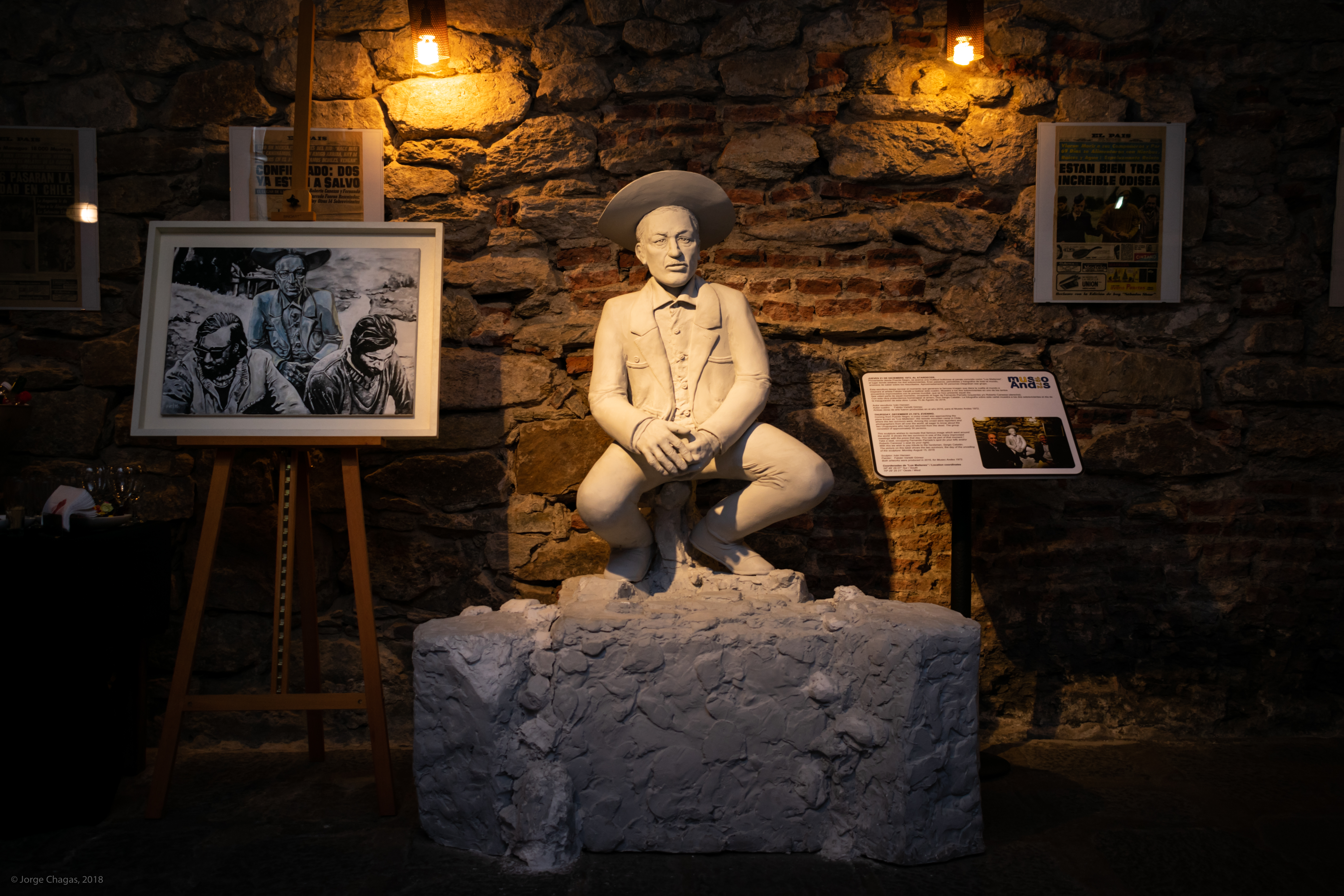
The sculpture of Sergio Catalán, a Chilean arriero, next to a display case with his original poncho, located in the Andes Museum 1972, Ciudad Vieja, Montevideo, Uruguay

=== Library, foundation, monument, and museum ===
The mothers of 11 of the victims who died in the crash founded Uruguay's Our Children Library in 1973 to promote reading and teaching.

Family members of victims founded Fundación Viven in 2006 in order to preserve the legacy of the Andes crash, the memory of the victims, and to support organ donation. In addition, the families of the victims of the crash built a black obelisk monument at the crash site to memorialize those who lived and died there in March 2006.

The story of the crash is the focus of the Andes Museum 1972, which opened in 2013 in Ciudad Vieja, Montevideo.

=== Sergio Catalán ===
In 2007, while being interviewed on Chilean television, arriero Sergio Catalán revealed he had arthrosis of the hip. Canessa (who had become a doctor) and other survivors raised money to pay for his hip replacement surgery. Catalán died in 2020 at the age of 91.

=== Site tours ===
The crash site attracts hundreds of visitors from all over the world each year. Several tour companies offer excursions to the site that pay tribute to the victims and survivors and how they managed to survive. The trip to the site takes three or four days. Four-wheel drive vehicles take visitors from the village of El Sosneado in Mendoza to Puesto Araya near the abandoned Hotel Termas el Sosneado. From there, travelers either continue on horseback or walk for three days to reach the crash site. They spend their first night in the Valley of Tears at the El Barroso camp site. On the third day, they reach the Las Lágrimas glacier and the crash site.

== Media ==
=== Documentaries ===
- Alive: 20 Years Later (1993) is an American documentary film produced, directed, and written by Jill Fullerton-Smith and narrated by Martin Sheen. It explores the lives of the survivors 20 years after the crash and discusses their participation in the production of the 1993 American film, Alive: The Miracle of the Andes.
- Stranded: I've Come from a Plane that Crashed on the Mountains (2007), written and directed by Gonzalo Arijón, is a documentary film interlaced with dramatised scenes. All the survivors are interviewed, along with some of their family members and people involved with the rescue operation, and an expedition in which the survivors return to the crash site is documented. The film premiered at the 2007 International Documentary Film Festival Amsterdam, Netherlands and received the Joris Ivens Award. This film appeared on PBS Independent Lens as "Stranded: The Andes Plane Crash Survivors" in May 2009.
- Trapped-National Geographic Channel series: "Episode 1, "Alive in the Andes" (7 November 2007) is the first episode of the National Geographic Channel documentary television series Trapped. This series examines incidents that left survivors trapped in their situation for a period of time.
- I Am Alive: Surviving the Andes Plane Crash (20 October 2010) is a documentary film directed by Brad Osborne that first aired on the History Channel. The film mixed reenactments with interviews with the survivors and members of the original search teams. Also interviewed were Piers Paul Read, renowned mountain climber Ed Viesturs, Andes Survivors expert and alpinist Ricardo Peña, historians, expert pilots, and high-altitude medical experts.
- Prisoners of the Snow: A Special Edition of 20/20 (22 May 2023), is an American documentary broadcast on ABC News.
- Alive: The Andes Plane Disaster (originally Andes Plane Crash) is a 2024 ITN television three-part documentary, directed and produced by Oliver Price. It is streaming on Amazon Prime.
- Beyond Society (Más allá de la sociedad) is an upcoming 2026 documentary series.

=== Feature films ===
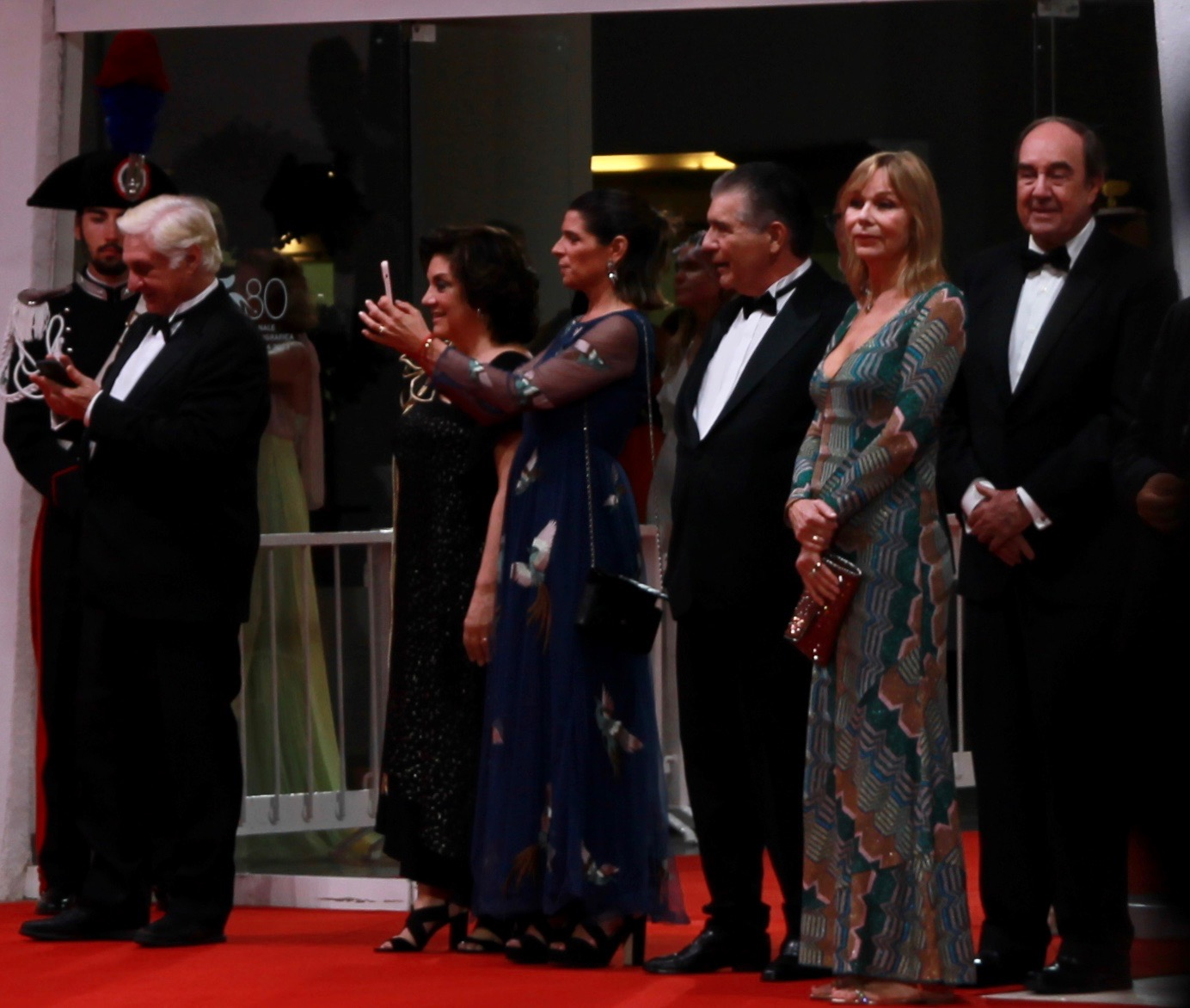
Survivors Canessa, Páez Rodríguez and Parrado (from the left) attend the Venice première of the movie Society of the Snow with their wives in 2023.

- Survive! (1976), also known as Supervivientes de los Andes, is a Spanish-language feature film (from Mexico) directed by René Cardona, Jr., and based on Clay Blair's 1973 unauthorized account, Survive!
- Alive (1993) is an American English-language feature film directed by Frank Marshall, with a cast of actors from the United States. It is based on Piers Paul Read's 1974 book Alive: The Story of the Andes Survivors. Nando Parrado served as a technical adviser to the film, and 11 of the survivors visited the set during the production.
- Society of the Snow (La sociedad de la nieve, 2023), also known as La Sociedad de la Nieve, is a Spanish-language feature film (from Spain) directed by J. A. Bayona, with a cast of actors from Uruguay and Argentina. It is based on Pablo Vierci's 2008 book of the same name, features cameos of several of the survivors, and premiered on Netflix on 4 January 2024. It won 12 awards including Best Picture and Best Director at the 38th Goya Awards, 6 awards at the 11th Platino Awards, and was nominated for 2 Academy Awards.

=== Podcasts ===
- Sarah Marshall and Blair Braverman chronicled the story in the podcast You're Wrong About in October 2022 for its Halloween episode.
- "Lost in an icy hell: my 72 day mountain escape" chronicles the story in an interview with survivor Nando Parrado as part of the BBC's podcast series Lives Less Ordinary, hosted by Asya Fouks.
- Alaina Urquhart and Ash Kelley covered the crash on their true crime podcast Morbid on 20 January 2025 in "Episode 638: The Crash of Uruguayan Air Force Flight 571".
- The Last Podcast on the Left covered the crash with a three-part series "Survival in the Andes" in December 2023: "Part I – Stayin' Alive", "Part II – Buried Alive", and "Part III – Still Alive".

=== Theater ===
- The play Sobrevivir a los Andes (Surviving the Andes) was written by Gabriel Guerrero and premiered on 13 October 2017. Based on the account written by Nando Parrado, it was presented in 2017 at Teatro la Candela in Montevideo, Uruguay, and in 2018 at Teatro Regina in Buenos Aires, Argentina.
- Miracle Flight 571, composed and created by Lloyd Burritt, is a two-act chamber opera based on the book Miracle in the Andes by Parrado. It received its musical premiere at the 2016 What Next Festival of Music.

== See also ==
- List of accidents involving sports teams
- List of incidents of cannibalism
