= Beyond Society =

2026 film

- Más allá de la sociedad
- Genre: Documentary
- Created by: J. A. Bayona and Carlos Torres
- Directed by: Carlos Torres
- Country of origin: Spain
- Original language: Spanish
- No. of seasons: 1
- No. of episodes: 3

Production
- Producers: J. A. Bayona; Belén Atienza; Sandra Hermida

Original release
- Network: Netflix

Beyond Society (Spanish: Más allá de la sociedad) is an upcoming 2026 documentary series. Created by Society of the Snow director J. A. Bayona and Carlos Torres, the series focuses on the lives of both the survivors and relatives of the deceased who were involved in the crash of Uruguayan Air Force Flight 571 in the Andes Mountains on October 13, 1972. It includes interviews with the authors Piers Paul Read and Pablo Vierci, and the filmmakers Frank Marshall and J. A. Bayona.

Beyond Society premiered at the 74th San Sebastián International Film Festival on September 23, 2026, and will be released on Netflix on December 18, 2026.
