= Roberto Canessa =

Uruguayan rugby union footballer and pediatric cardiologist

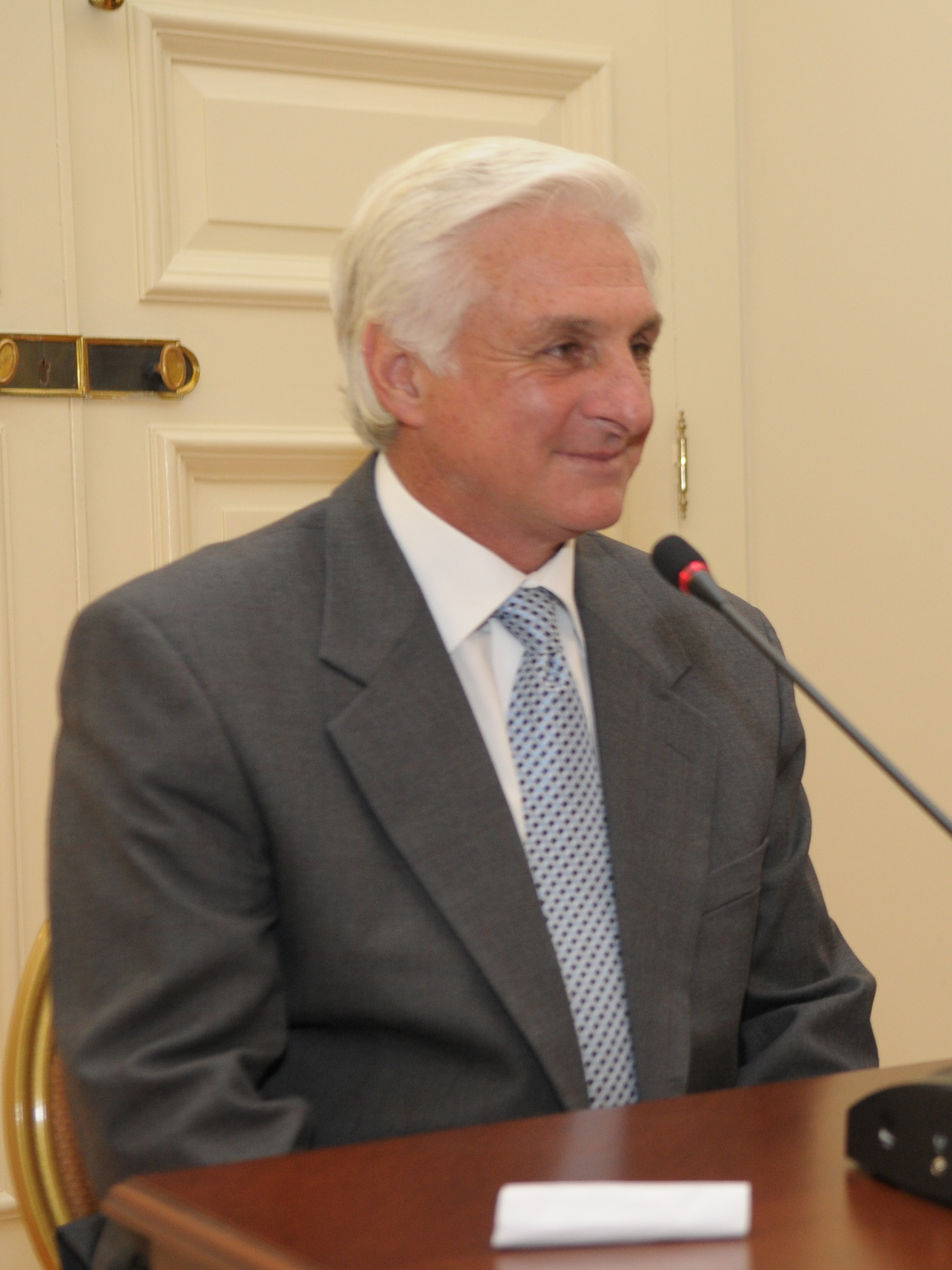
- Roberto Canessa in 2010
- Born: Roberto Jorge Canessa Urta; 17 January 1953 (age 73); Montevideo, Uruguay
- Education: University of the Republic
- Occupations: Pediatric cardiologist; Motivational speaker; Lecturer
- Spouse: Laura Surraco (m. 1976)
- Children: 3
- Website: robertocanessa.com

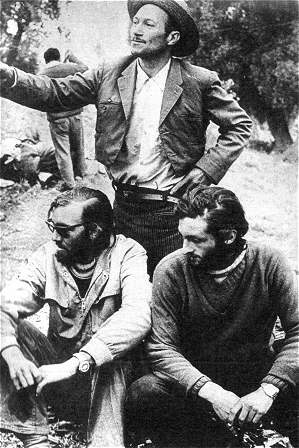
Parrado (left) and Canessa with Chilean Huaso Sergio Catalan (the man who found them), 1972

Roberto Jorge Canessa Urta (born 17 January 1953) is a Uruguayan paediatric cardiologist, motivational speaker, and former rugby player. He is one of the sixteen survivors of the Uruguayan Air Force Flight 571 crash in the Andes mountains on 13 October 1972. He was portrayed by Josh Hamilton in the 1993 feature film Alive and by Argentine actor Matías Recalt in the 2023 Spanish feature film Society of the Snow.

== Early life and education ==
Canessa Urta was born in Montevideo on 17 January 1953, the son of physician Juan Carlos Canessa Montero (1928-2009) and María Mercedes Urta Stagnero (died 2011). He is of Italian descent, tracing his ancestry to Rapallo, Liguria. He attended Stella Maris College, located in barrio Carrasco, and was part of the school's alumni rugby club, Old Christians. In 1971, he began to study medicine at the University of the Republic. Between 1971 and 1979, he played eight matches with the Uruguay national rugby union team, and was also selected for the 1980 South American Jaguars rugby union tour of South Africa.

== 13 October 1972 plane crash ==
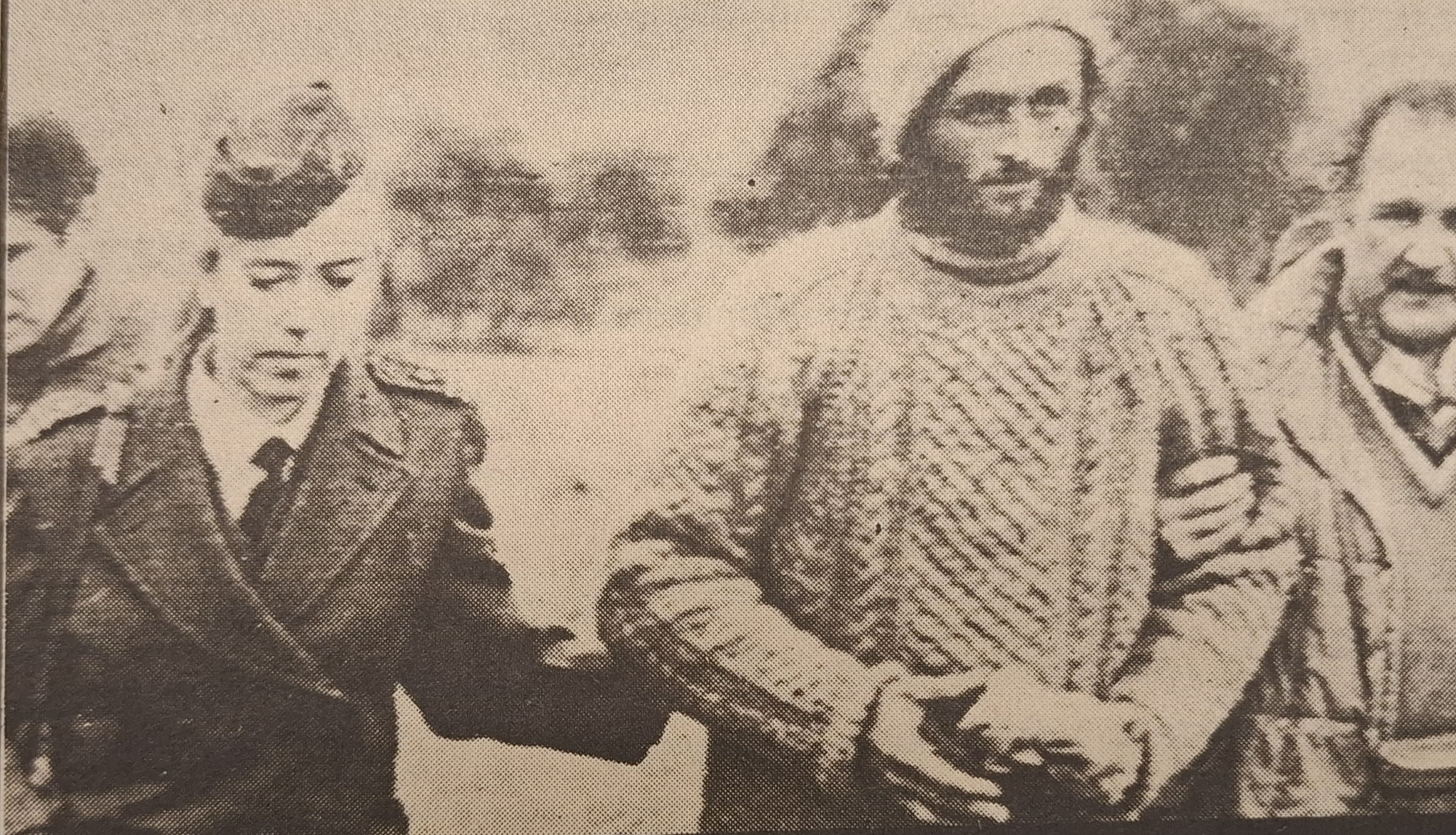
Roberto shortly after being rescued

At the time of the crash of Uruguayan Air Force Flight 571, Canessa was a 19-year-old medical student. He suggested to his fellow survivors that to stay alive, they should eat the flesh of the deceased victims of the crash, which they did after days of "agonis[ing]" over having to resort to such a means. Together with Fernando Parrado, he trekked through the Andes for 10 days in search of help for the survivors.

== Career ==
After returning to Uruguay from the Andes, Canessa graduated from the University of the Republic with a medical degree, later specializing in cardiology and pediatric cardiology. He serves as vice president of the Fundación Corazoncitos, which provides care for children with congenital heart disease. Throughout his career, Canessa has worked as a pediatric cardiologist and researcher at the Italian Hospital of Montevideo and the Hospital Pereira Rosell. He has also taught graduate courses at the University of the Republic. In 2019, he was conferred the title of honorary fellow of the American College of Cardiology. In 2020 during the COVID-19 pandemic, he led a group of professional volunteers to create respirators for ICUs.

In the 1994 general election, Canessa ran for President of Uruguay for the Blue Party. He received 1645 votes (0.08% of the vote) lagging far behind former President, Julio María Sanguinetti, whose party returned to power with 30.83% of the public vote. In 2012, he and Sergio Abreu founded the National Dignity faction within the National Party. In 2019, Open Cabildo presidential candidate Guido Manini Ríos offered him the vice presidency, but Canessa turned it down.

== Filmography ==
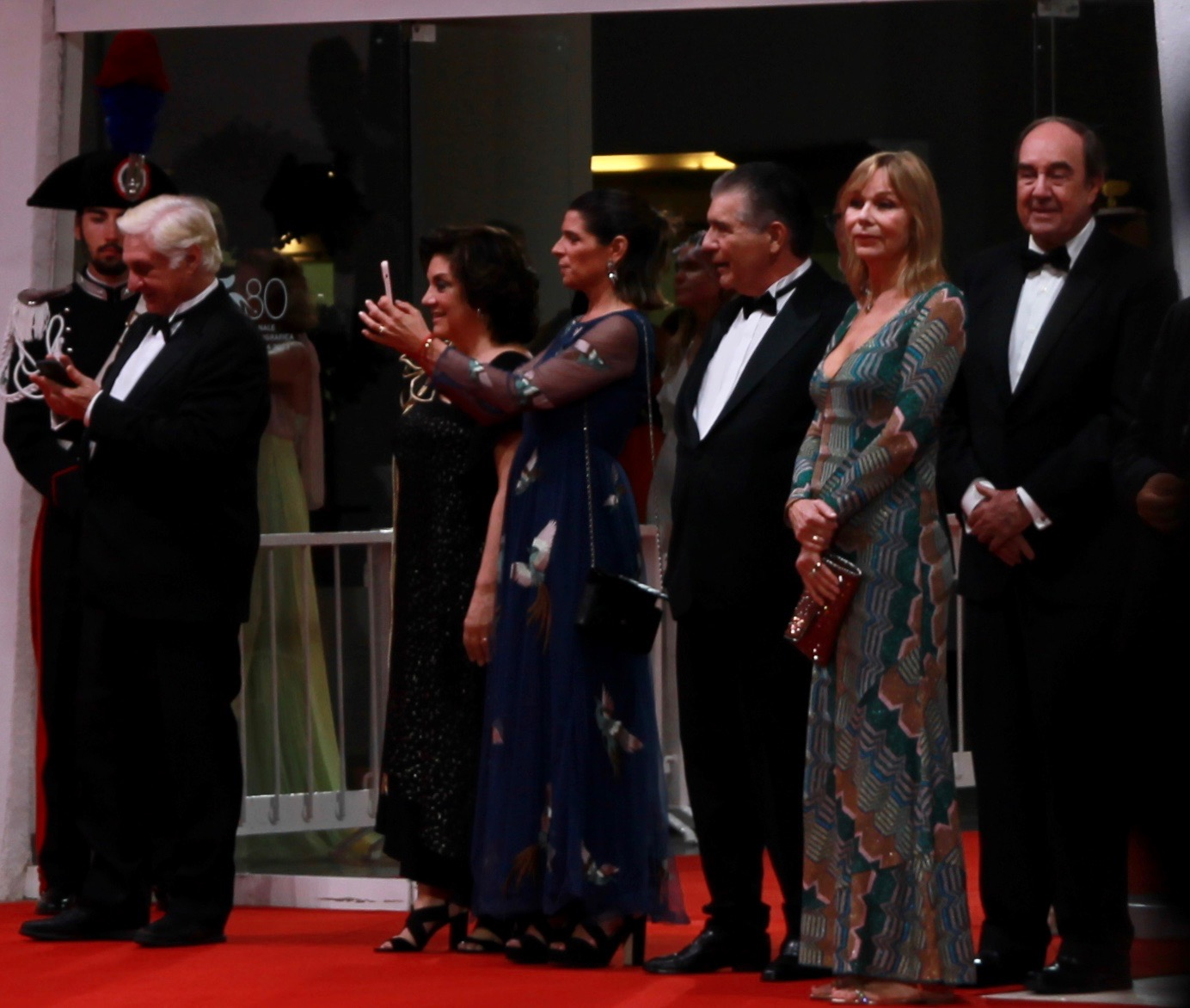
Roberto Canessa, Fernando Parrado, and Carlos Páez Rodríguez attend the Venice premiere of the film "Society of the Snow" in 2023.

Canessa was portrayed by Josh Hamilton in Alive, the 1993 feature film directed by Frank Marshall and based on Piers Paul Read's 1974 book Alive: The Story of the Andes Survivors. He was also portrayed by Matías Recalt in Society of the Snow, the 2023 feature film directed by J. A. Bayona and based on the book by Pablo Vierci. Recalt won the Goya Award for Best New Actor for his portrayal of Canessa.

Year	Title	Role	Notes
1993	Alive: 20 Years Later	himself	video documentary
2006	Alive: Back to the Andes	himself	TV documentary
2007	Stranded: I've Come from a Plane That Crashed on the Mountains	himself	documentary
2009	Independent Lens' (Stranded: The Andes Plane Crash Survivors)	himself	TV series documentary
2010	I Am Alive: Surviving the Andes Plane Crash	himself	documentary aired on History Channel
2023	Society of the Snow	Chilean Hospital Doctor	feature film
2024	Society of the Snow: Who Were We on the Mountain?	himself	Netflix documentary

== Personal life ==
As Canessa began dating Laura Surraco in her adolescence and early youth, they were a couple at the time of the accident. They married in 1976 and have three children: Hilario, Roberto Martín, and Laura Inés.

On April 11, 2024, after a conference organized the previous day in Torreón, Mexico, two videos went viral on Twitter accusing Canessa of inappropriately groping attendees at the event. The incident was condemned among netizens and feminist collectives, some of whom urged Canessa to issue a public apology. On April 12, El País reported that they had tried to contact Canessa to talk about what happened. He refused to comment, stating that the remarks on social networks had been made in "bad faith".

== Book ==
In March 2016, Canessa published his memoir, Tenía que sobrevivir: Cómo un accidente aéreo en los Andes inspiró mi vocación para salvar vidas, co-written with the Uruguayan author Pablo Vierci. The English translation, I Had to Survive: How a Plane Crash in the Andes Inspired My Calling to Save Lives, was published by Simon & Schuster.

== Bibliography ==
- Read, Piers Paul (1974). Alive: The Story of the Andes Survivors (First ed.). J. B. Lippincott Company. ISBN 039701001X. The 1993 film, Alive, is an adaptation of this book.
- Vierci, Pablo (2024). Society of the Snow: The Definitive Account of the World's Greatest Survival Story. Translated by Erikson, Jennie. Constable. ISBN 978-1408716373. Originally published in Spanish in 2008 as La Sociedad de la Nieve: Por Primera Vez Los 16 Sobrevivientes Cuentan la Historia Completa. The 2023 film, Society of the Snow, is an adaptation of this book.
