= Nando Parrado =

Survivor of the 1972 Andes flight disaster

- Born: Fernando Seler Parrado Dolgay; 9 December 1949 (age 76); Montevideo, Uruguay
- Education: Jim Russell Racing Driver School
- Alma mater: Stella Maris College (Montevideo)
- Occupations: Entrepreneur; TV presenter; motivational speaker; author
- Writing career
- Genre: Memoir
- Subject: The 1972 crash of Uruguayan Air Force Flight 571 into the Andes mountains
- Notable work: Miracle in the Andes: 72 Days on the Mountain and My Long Trek Home (with Vince Rause)

Fernando "Nando" Seler Parrado Dolgay (born 9 December 1949) is a Uruguayan businessman, producer, motivational speaker, author, television presenter, former rugby player, and a racing driver. He is one of the sixteen survivors of the Uruguayan Air Force Flight 571, which crashed in the Andes on 13 October 1972. After spending more than two months trapped in the mountains with the other crash survivors, he, along with Roberto Canessa, climbed through the Andes mountains over 10 days to find help.

== Background ==
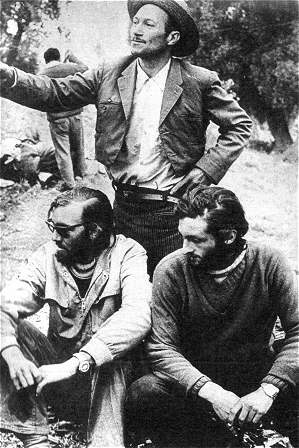
Parrado (left) and Canessa with Chilean Huaso Sergio Catalan (the man who found them), 1972

=== Early life ===
Parrado was born in Montevideo on December 9, 1949, the second of three children of Seler Parrado and Xenia "Eugenia" Dolgay, a Ukrainian immigrant who arrived in Uruguay at the age of 16. Raised in the Carrasco neighborhood, he attended Stella Maris College, and played for its alumni rugby team, Old Christians Club.

At the time of the Andes crash, he was a university student. Of his life before the accident, Parrado states that:

When it finally came time to choose a college, I decided to enroll in agricultural school, because that was where my closest friends were going. When my father heard the news, he shrugged and smiled. 'Nando,' he said, 'your friends' families own farms and ranches. We have hardware stores.' It was not hard for him to talk me into changing my mind. In the end, I did what made sense: I entered business school with no serious thought about what school would mean for me or where this decision might lead. I would graduate or I would not. I would run the hardware stores, or maybe I wouldn't. My life would present itself to me when it was ready. In the meantime, I spent the summer being Nando; I played rugby, I chased girls with Panchito, I raced my little Renault along the beach roads at Punta del Este, I went to parties and I lay in the sun, I lived for the moment, drifting with the tide, waiting for my future to reveal itself, always happy to let others lead the way.

=== After the Andes ===
Parrado co-wrote the 2006 book Miracle in the Andes: 72 Days on the Mountain and My Long Trek Home, with Vince Rause. The book references Piers Paul Read's 1974 account of the accident and aftermath, Alive: The Story of the Andes Survivors, a book based on interviews with the survivors. Miracle in the Andes, however, is told only from Parrado's point of view 34 years later. In Chapter 10 of Miracle in the Andes, Parrado notes that after he returned from the mountains, he struggled to cope with the loss of his mother and younger sister Susy in the Andes. He gave up his formal studies, drifted for a period of time, and helped out with his father's business.

As he was interested in the field of sports car racing (and after meeting Jackie Stewart), Parrado enrolled in the Jim Russell Racing Driver School. For many years, he developed a career as a professional race car driver, which he gave up after his marriage to Veronique Van Wassenhove. He then took over his father's hardware business alongside his older sister Graciela and her husband, and developed additional businesses (that included becoming a television personality in Uruguay). In addition to his work in business and television, Parrado is a motivational speaker, using his experience in the Andes to help others cope with psychological trauma.

In 2020, a racehorse named after Parrado won the Coventry Stakes at the Royal Ascot meeting. Parrado gave his consent for the horse to be named after him.

== Filmography ==
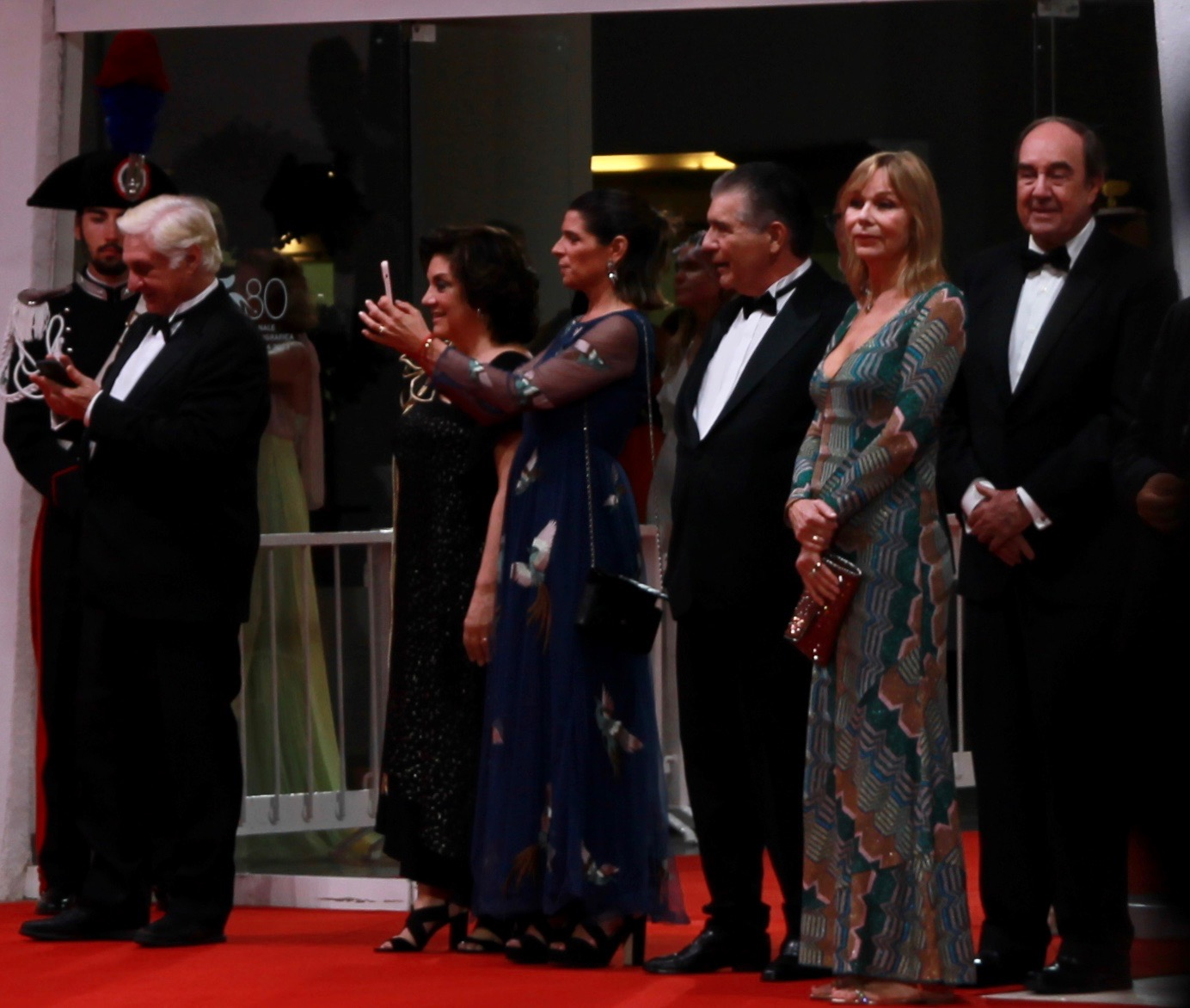
Roberto Canessa, Fernando Parrado, and Carlos Páez Rodríguez attend the Venice premiere of the film "Society of the Snow" in 2023.

Parrado was portrayed by Ethan Hawke in the 1993 feature film Alive and by Argentine actor Agustín Pardella in the 2023 Spanish feature film Society of the Snow.

Year	Title	Role	Notes
1993	Alive	technical advisor	feature film
1993	Alive: 20 Years Later	himself	video documentary
2002	Return to the Andes	himself	video documentary short
2006	Alive: Back to the Andes	himself	TV documentary
2007	Stranded: I've Come from a Plane That Crashed on the Mountains	himself	documentary
2009	Independent Lens' (Stranded: The Andes Plane Crash Survivors)	himself	TV series documentary
2010	I Am Alive: Surviving the Andes Plane Crash	himself	documentary aired on History Channel
2023	Society of the Snow	Airport family member	feature film
2024	Society of the Snow: Who Were We on the Mountain?	himself	Netflix documentary
2024	Alive: The Andes Plane Disaster (originally Andes Plane Crash)	himself	ITN documentary (currently streaming on Amazon Prime)

== Bibliography ==
- Read, Piers Paul (1974). Alive: The Story of the Andes Survivors (First ed.). J. B. Lippincott Company. ISBN 039701001X. The 1993 film, Alive, is an adaptation of this book.
- Parrado, Nando; Rause, Vince (2006). Miracle in the Andes: 72 Days on the Mountain and My Long Trek Home. Perfection Learning Corporation. ISBN 978-0-7569-8847-0.
- Vierci, Pablo (2024). Society of the Snow: The Definitive Account of the World's Greatest Survival Story. Translated by Erikson, Jennie. Constable. ISBN 978-1408716373. Originally published in Spanish in 2008 as La Sociedad de la Nieve: Por Primera Vez Los 16 Sobrevivientes Cuentan la Historia Completa. The 2023 film, Society of the Snow, is an adaptation of this book.
- Godfrey, Chris (4 December 2023). "My plane crashed in the Andes. Only the unthinkable kept me and the other starving survivors alive (Nando Parrado)". The Guardian.
