= Pablo Vierci =

Uruguayan journalist, author and screenwriter (born 1950)

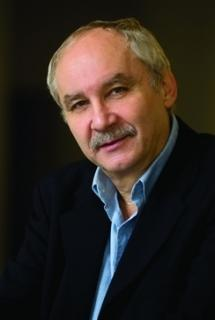
- Born: Carrasco, Montevideo, Uruguay
- Education: Stella Maris College
- Occupations: journalist; author; screenwriter

Pablo Vierci is a Uruguayan journalist, author, and screenwriter.

== 1972 Andes Plane crash ==
Vierci was born in Carrasco, Montevideo, Uruguay. He attended, and was the school “scribe” for, the Stella Maris College with Nando Parrado, Roberto Canessa and the other rugby players involved in the 1972 plane crash in the Andes mountains. He was also part of the rugby team while a student at Stella Maris College.

In February 1973, shortly after Parrado returned to Montevideo, he asked Vierci to help him write a book about his experience in the Andes. Although Vierci agreed (and worked with Parrado on it for a few months), he was later asked to drop the project after the survivors began to work on what would become the 1974 book, Alive: The Story of the Andes Survivors.

In 2005, Vierci was asked to write a book on the Stella Maris College that included a chapter on the Andes. His work on that project eventually led to his 2008 book La sociedad de la nieve (The Society of the Snow), which retells the events of the Andes plane crash through the perspectives of the survivors three decades later. It also offers full oral histories of each of the 16 survivors. Filmmaker J. A. Bayona adapted this book into the 2023 Spanish film Society of the Snow. Beyond Society (Más allá de la sociedad) is an upcoming 2026 documentary series, that will be released on Netflix December 18, 2026. It will include interviews with the authors Piers Paul Read and Pablo Vierci and the filmmakers Frank Marshall and J. A. Bayona.

=== Works ===
- Vierci, Pablo (2023). Society of the Snow: The Definitive Account of the World's Greatest Survival Story. Translated by Erikson, Jennie. Constable. ISBN 978-1408716373. Originally published in Spanish in 2008 as La Sociedad de la Nieve: Por Primera Vez Los 16 Sobrevivientes Cuentan la Historia Completa.
- Canessa, Roberto; Vierci, Pablo (2016). I Had to Survive: How a Plane Crash in the Andes Inspired My Calling to Save Lives. Translated by Frias, Carlos. Simon and Schuster. ISBN 978-1-4767-6545-7. Originally published in Spanish as Cómo un accidente aéreo en los Andes inspiró mi vocación para salvar vidas.

== Additional works ==
- 1979, Los tramoyistas
- 1984, Pequeña historia de una mujer
- 1987, Detrás de los árboles
- 2004, 99% asesinado
- 2010, De Marx a Obama (ISBN 978-6074298802)
- 2011, Artigas La Redota
- 2012, El desertor (ISBN 978-9500744300)
- 2014, Ellas 5
- 2018, El fin de la inocencia

== Awards ==
- 2003: Citi Journalistic Excellence Award.
