= Alive: The Story of the Andes Survivors =

1974 non-fiction book

Alive
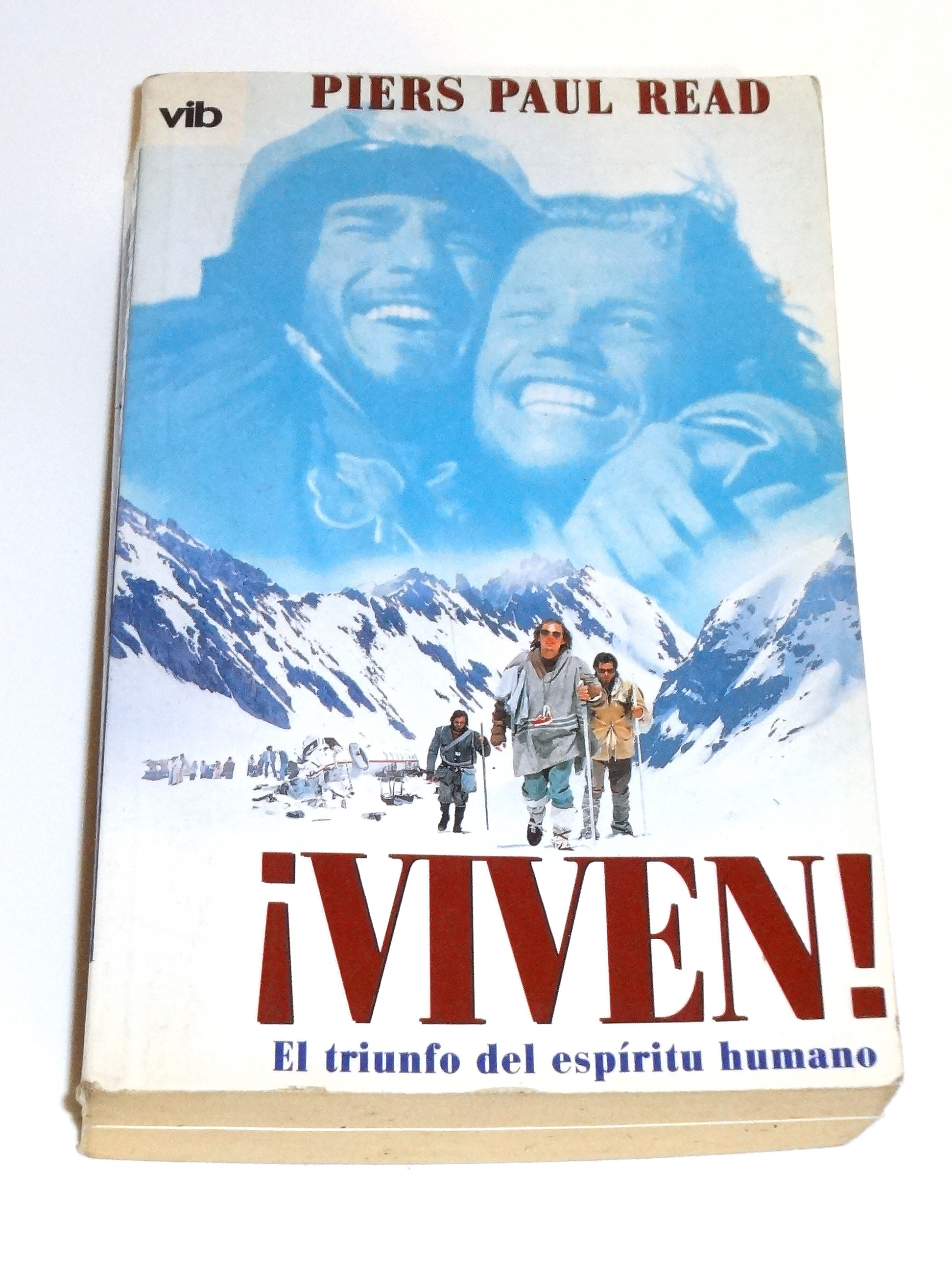
- ¡Viven! – Spanish-language edition
- Author: Piers Paul Read
- Original title: Alive. The Story of the Andes Survivors
- Language: English
- Publisher: J.B. Lippincott Company
- Publication date: 1974
- Publication place: United Kingdom

Alive is a 1974 book by the British writer Piers Paul Read documenting the events of Uruguayan Air Force Flight 571.

== Story ==
Alive tells the story of an Uruguayan rugby team (who were alumni of Stella Maris College), and their friends and family who were involved in the airplane crash of Uruguayan Air Force Flight 571. The plane crashed into the Andes Mountains on Friday 13 October 1972. Of the 45 people on the flight, only 16 survived 72 days of sub-zero temperatures.

A search was conducted for eight days, but bad weather prevented searching for two days. The survivors found little food in the crashed fuselage. Facing starvation, the crash survivors realized to survive, they would need to eat the frozen bodies of the dead.

The book was published two years after the survivors were rescued. The author interviewed many of the survivors as well as the family members of the passengers. He wanted to write the story as it had happened without embellishment. He recalled:

At times I was tempted to fictionalize certain parts of the story because this might have added to their dramatic impact but in the end I decided that the bare facts were sufficient to sustain the narrative...when I returned in October 1973 to show them the manuscript of this book, some of them were disappointed by my presentation of their story. They felt that the faith and friendship which inspired them in the cordillera do not emerge from these pages. It was never my intention to underestimate these qualities, but perhaps it would be beyond the skill of any writer to express their own appreciation of what they lived through.

== Reception ==
The book was a critical success. Walter Clemons in Newsweek declared that it "will become a classic in the literature of survival".

Keith Mano of The New York Times Book Review gave the book a "rave" review, stating that "Read's style is savage: unliterary, undecorated as a prosecutor's brief." He also described the book as an important one:

Cowardice, selfishness, whatever: their essential heroism can weather Read's objectivity. He has made them human. 'Alive' is thunderous entertainment: I know the events by rote, nonetheless I found it electric. And important. 'Alive' should be read by sociologists, educators, the Joint Chief of Staff. By anyone, in fact, whose business it is to prepare men for adversity.

Michel Roger concurs, stating that: "Read has risen above the sensational and managed a book of real and lasting value."

== Editions ==
The first edition was released in 1974. A paperback that referenced the film Alive: The Miracle of the Andes was released in 1993. A new softcover edition, with a revised introduction and additional interviews with Piers Paul Read, Coche Inciarte, and Alvaro Mangino, was released by HarperCollins in 2005. This edition also has a new subtitle: Sixteen Men, Seventy-two Days, and Insurmountable Odds: The Classic Adventure of Survival in the Andes. The book was also re-released, simply titled Alive, in October 2012.

== Films ==
- Alive by Frank Marshall was released in 1993. A companion documentary, Alive: 20 Years Later, was made at the same time.
- Beyond Society (Más allá de la sociedad) is an upcoming 2026 documentary series, that will be released on Netflix December 18, 2026. It will include interviews with the authors Piers Paul Read and Pablo Vierci and the filmmakers Frank Marshall and J. A. Bayona.

== Music ==
The book inspired the song "The Plot Sickens" on the album Every Trick in the Book by the American metalcore band Ice Nine Kills.
