= Páez (surname) =

Páez is a Spanish surname. Notable people with the surname include:

== Arts ==
- Agó Páez (born 1954), Uruguayan plastic artist
- Alex Paez (born 1963), American actor, musician, and restaurateur
- Carlos Páez Rodríguez (born 1953), Uruguayan air crash survivor, son of Carlos Páez Vilaró
- Carlos Páez Vilaró (1923–2014), Uruguayan artist and writer
- Fito Páez (born 1963), Argentine singer
- Francisco Páez (singer), Guatemalan singer and songwriter
- Francisco Páez de la Cadena (born 1951), Spanish garden historian

== Sports ==
- Antonio Páez (born 1956), Spanish middle distance runner
- Anthony Paez (born 1984), American basketball player
- Azriel Páez (born 1989), Mexican boxer, son of Jorge Páez
- Francisco Páez (swimmer) (born 1979), Venezuelan swimmer
- Hector Páez (born 1982), Colombian cross-country mountain biker
- Jedixson Páez (born 2004), Venezuelan baseball player
- Jorge Páez (born 1965), Mexican boxer, actor, and circus performer
- Jorge Páez, Jr. (born 1987), Mexican boxer
- Robert Páez (born 1994), Venezuelan diver
- Ron Paez (1931–2014), Australian rules football player
- Verónica Páez (born 1974), Argentine marathon runner

=== Association football ===
- Ariel Páez (born 1984), Chilean midfielder
- Carlos Paez (born 1978), Honduran midfielder
- Gaspar Páez (born 1986), Argentine footballer
- Guillermo Páez (born 1945), Chilean footballer
- Gustavo Páez (born 1990), Venezuelan forward
- Javier Páez (born 1975), Argentine defender
- Kendry Páez (born 2007), Ecuadorian midfielder
- Luis Alfonso Páez (born 1986), Colombian forward
- Luis Fernando Páez (born 1989), Paraguayan forward
- Mauro Andrés Manotas Páez (born 1995), Colombian forward
- Rafael Páez (born 1994), Spanish defender
- Raúl Páez (1937–1996), Argentine defender
- Ricardo David Páez (born 1979), Venezuelan midfielder
- Richard Páez (born 1952), Venezuelan manager
- Sebastián Páez (born 1983), Chilean midfielder
- Sergio Ariel Páez (born 1981), Argentine midfielder

== Others ==
- Federico Páez (1876–1974), President of Ecuador 1935–1937
- José Antonio Páez (1790–1873), Venezuelan independence leader and president
- Juan Paez de Castro (1512–1570), Spanish Jesuit priest
- Oscar Páez Garcete (1937–2016), Paraguayan Roman Catholic bishop
- Pedro Páez (1564–1622), Spanish Jesuit missionary in Ethiopia
- Richard Paez (born 1947), U.S. federal judge
- Pablo Martín Páez Gavira (born 2004), Spanish footballer
