= Alfredo Esteban Bustamante Guerrero =

- Born: Alfredo Esteban Bustamante Guerrero; December 26, 1896; Montevideo, Uruguay
- Died: August 1962; Montevideo, Uruguay
- Education: Universidad del Trabajo del Uruguay, Pedro Blanes Viale
- Known for: Painting
- Notable work: Paso del Molino (1958)
- Awards: Andrés Ramponi Prize (Bronze Medal), XXII Salón de Artes Plásticas, Montevideo (1958)

Alfredo Esteban Bustamante Guerrero (26 December 1896 – August 1962) was a Uruguayan painter. He was born and died in Montevideo. His work forms part of the collection of the Museo Nacional de Artes Visuales (MNAV), where he is recognized among 20th-century Uruguayan artists.

== Early life and education ==
Bustamante Guerrero was born in Montevideo on 26 December 1896 and studied at the Universidad del Trabajo del Uruguay (UTU). He received guidance for his artistic development from Pedro Blanes Viale.

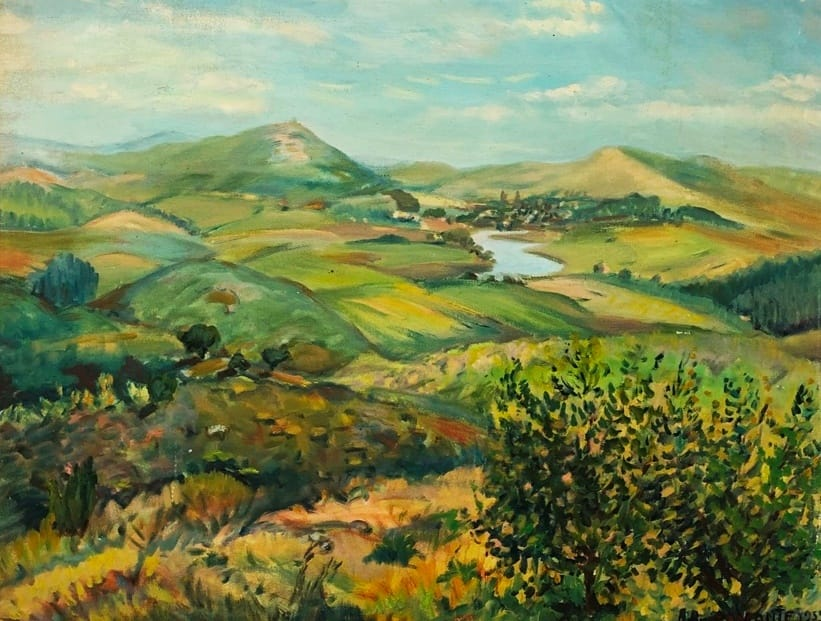
Landscape, A. Bustamante, 1955, oil on canvas

== Career ==
Bustamante Guerrero participated in numerous collective exhibitions and National and Municipal Salons of Visual Arts, holding a single solo exhibition in 1957. Bustamante Guerrero’s works are preserved in the permanent collection of the Museo Nacional de Artes Visuales. His paintings, often focused on urban and rural Uruguayan themes, reflect the transition between early 20th-century realism and mid-century local modernism. Bustamante Guerrero died in Montevideo in August 1962.

== Awards ==
- 1939 – III Salón Nacional de Bellas Artes (Montevideo): Mención especial for El cedro y la Santa Rita.
- 1940 – IV Salón Nacional de Bellas Artes (Montevideo): Mención for La casita.
- 1944 – VIII Salón Nacional de Bellas Artes (Montevideo): Premio Casa Taranco y Cía., Bronze Medal for Alrededores del Cerrito.
- 1945 – IX Salón Nacional de Bellas Artes (Montevideo): Premio Diario “La Razón”, Bronze Medal for Paisaje.
- 1949 – XIII Salón de Pintura y Escultura (Montevideo): Premio Banco de la República, Bronze Medal for Reparando el dique.
- 1950 – XIV Salón de Pintura y Escultura (Montevideo): Premio Banco de la República, Bronze Medal for Construcción.
- 1953 – XVII Salón de Artes Plásticas (Montevideo–Mercedes–Tacuarembó): Premio UTE, Bronze Medal for Zona industrial.
- 1957 – XXI Salón de Artes Plásticas (Montevideo): Premio ANCAP, Bronze Medal for Paisaje.
- 1958 – XXII Salón de Artes Plásticas (Montevideo): Premio Andrés Ramponi, Bronze Medal for Paso del Molino.
