= Alive: 20 Years Later =

1993 film

- Directed by: Jill Fullerton-Smith
- Produced by: Jill Fullerton-Smith
- Narrated by: Martin Sheen
- Distributed by: Touchstone Home Video
- Release date: January 30, 1993
- Running time: 51 minutes
- Languages: English; Spanish

Alive: 20 Years Later is a 1993 documentary film produced, directed and written by Jill Fullerton-Smith and narrated by Martin Sheen. The documentary focused on the lives of the 16 survivors, 20 years after Uruguayan Air Force Flight 571 crash in the Andes Mountains on October 13, 1972. It also discussed their participation in the production of the 1993 feature film Alive.

The documentary first aired on CBS on January 30, 1993.

== Interviews (survivors, family, friends) ==
- Laura Canessa
- Roberto Canessa
- Sergio Catalan
- Pancho Delgado
- Daniel Fernandez
- Roberto François
- Roy Harley
- Coche Inciarte
- Alvaro Mangino
- Carlos Páez Rodríguez
- Nando Parrado
- Father Rojas
- Adolfo Strauch
- Eduardo Strauch
- Rosina Strauch
- Gustavo Zerbino
