= Francisco Páez =

Francisco Páez may refer to:

- Francisco Páez (singer), from Guatemala
- Francisco Páez (swimmer) (born 1979), from Venezuela
- Francisco Páez de la Cadena (born 1951), Spanish historian
