= Numa Turcatti =

Uruguayan law student

- Born: Numa Turcatti Pesquera; 30 October 1947; Montevideo, Uruguay
- Died: 11 December 1972 (aged 25); Glacier of Tears, Argentina
- Cause of death: Uruguayan Air Force Flight 571
- Education: University of the Republic

Numa Turcatti Pesquera (30 October 1947 – 11 December 1972) was a Uruguayan law student, known for being one of the victims of the 1972 Uruguayan Air Force Flight 571 plane crash, dying 60 days after the crash. He is portrayed by Enzo Vogrincic in Society of the Snow (2023), where his character serves as the film's narrator.

== Biography ==
He was born on 30 October 1947, in Montevideo. He had four siblings, his twin Leonardo, Daniel, Gastón and Isabel. He attended the Colegio Seminario, a Jesuit school located in the Cordón neighborhood.

After graduating from high school, he began to study law at the Law School of the University of the Republic. He was a member and captain of the Loyola FC team created by alumni of Colegio Seminario and affiliated to the University Sports League in 1970, which was renamed the Numa Turcatti after his death.

=== Uruguayan Air Force Flight 571 ===
Numa Turcatti was 24 years old when he was invited to travel to Santiago, the capital of Chile. He decided to travel well over the date, encouraged by his friends Alfredo "Pancho" Delgado, Gastón Costemalle and Alfredo Cibils. They convinced Turcatti to join the flight due to the affordability of the ticket and for that reason, on 12 October he boarded the plane of flight 571. Aside from Costemalle, Turcatti did not know any of the other players of the Old Christians Rugby team nor with Stella Maris, the high school they represented before the accident of 13 October. He played football for the San Ignacio de Loyola team.

Although Turcatti had no connection with the Old Christians rugby team and did not know most of the students and passengers, he actively participated in the expeditions and helped the injured. Despite the lack of food, he was reluctant to consume human flesh from the bodies of the deceased. Due to a leg infection, he had to remain immobile and stop being part of the expeditions.

== Death ==
Turcatti had been surviving in the mountains for 60 days. Due to a septic condition, he died in his sleep having lost much of his body weight. He was the last fatal victim of the tragedy of flight 571 in the Andes. During his lectures, Gustavo Zerbino Stajano tells that Turcatti had written a passage from the Bible on a piece of paper in his hand when he died:

"Greater love hath no man than this, that a man lay down his life for his friends" (John 15:13).

== Legacy ==
- Due to the importance that Numa had in what was San Ignacio de Loyola up to that moment, his teammates decided to change the name of the team, which became "Numa Turcatti" from the 1973 season onwards.
- The character of Rafael Cano in the film Alive (1993 film) is based on Turcatti.
- Turcatti is a focal character of the film Society of the Snow, dedicated to his support for other victims and because he was the last one to die. The intention of director Juan Antonio Bayona was to pay more attention to those characters who had not survived and who did not have so much recognition. He was played by actor Enzo Vogrincic.

== See also ==
- Society of the Snow

== Bibliography ==
- Read, Piers Paul (1974). Alive: The Story of the Andes Survivors (First ed.). J. B. Lippincott Company. ISBN 039701001X. The 1993 film, Alive, is an adaptation of this book.
- Vierci, Pablo (2024). Society of the Snow: The Definitive Account of the World's Greatest Survival Story. Translated by Erikson, Jennie. Constable. ISBN 978-1408716373. Originally published in Spanish in 2008 as La Sociedad de la Nieve: Por Primera Vez Los 16 Sobrevivientes Cuentan la Historia Completa. The 2023 film, Society of the Snow, is an adaptation of this book.
