= Agó Páez Vilaró =

Uruguayan plastic artist (born 1954)

- Born: Agó Páez Rodríguez; 10 December 1954 (age 71); Montevideo, Uruguay
- Occupations: Painter, ceramicist, sculptor, muralist, writer
- Parents: Carlos Páez Vilaró (father); Madelón Rodríguez Gómez (mother)

Agó Páez (born 10 December 1954) is a Uruguayan plastic artist. Her work focuses on mandalas and the philosophy that supports them.

== Artistic training ==
In 1976, Páez received her first drawing orientation from maestro Vicente Martín. The following year she studied painting in Buenos Aires, in the workshop of Miguel Dávila. In 1989 she began her studies in the workshop of Clever Lara, and in 1992 she began to study drawing with Professor Guillermo Fernández and Martín Rodríguez. She took a color course in the workshop of Guillermo Bush in 1994, studied fine arts in Argentina, Brazil, and Uruguay, ceramics with Jaime Nowinsky in 1986, wood carving with Javier Nievas, and theater at the Theater Studies Center (CET) in 1991 where she decorated stages.

== Family ==
The last name Páez Vilaró is recognized worldwide for the work of her father Carlos, and because her brother Carlos is a survivor of the 1972 Andes flight disaster. She is the granddaughter of an Argentine woman from Rosario.

She has taken the Camino de Santiago road several times, as well as the Inca Trail, and has hiked to the Interior of Uruguay on foot.

I was born in an atelier; my world is linked to art since I remember, only that I felt internally that art should be for me the manifestation of the spirit.

— Agó Páez, 2008

Together with her two brothers, she helped her father to build Casapueblo, which would be his home, with wavy lines, without straightedge, plumb bob, or level. This architecture influenced her desire to have a house with similar properties, which she carried out in her Octagon, located in the caves of Punta Ballena, where she moved the workshop she had in Carrasco. It is a mud construction, with a roof of quincho and a glass dome. It measures 100 m^{3}, 3 m high walls, completely handmade with the collaboration of friends, artists, sculptors, painters and potters. There she has a biodynamic garden. She develops Waldorf education for children, mandala workshops, yoga classes, dance meetings, astrology, cinema, and permaculture.

== Artwork ==
=== Mandalas ===
The millenary art of mandalas is intended as a simple therapy to achieve harmony and peace in a group. The mandala is a geometric figure with significance in Buddhist cosmology.

Mandala is a word that means circle. It is an artistic expression that we see in most civilizations and that generates a great identification in children because it refers to the circular figure of the womb or the circular figure of the Earth [...] generates a connection with the inner being, with peace, with joy, with creative development, with the best of us.

— Agó Páez, October 2012, Cañuelas, Argentina

=== Murals ===
In 1997 she collaborated with her father Carlos Páez Vilaró on the mural of the Conrad Hotel in Punta del Este. There are many murals in the Uruguayan and Argentine schools, such as the one made in School No. 3 of San Gregorio de Polanco and the one painted in the resort of Las Grutas, Argentina, together with that of her father. In 1983 she worked on several murals in the city of Maldonado, in 1991 she donated five murals for the children of the Red Cross of Montevideo. In 1994 she made 140 m^{2} of murals at the Sanguinetti school and different child aid centers.

=== Other techniques ===
Páez has also made several watercolors with Professor Dante Piccarelli. In 1998 she collaborated with his father in painting the airplane of PLUNA/Varig.

== Workshops ==
In 1986 Agó Páez founded the Villa Lola workshop for children with Andrea Baridón. In 2000 she designed her atelier in Pittamiglio Castle where she also taught painting classes. She conducts workshops in various environments and occasions, for example, during Heritage Day in 2007, in Barrio Sur, Montevideo.

For decades the artist has visited schools in Uruguay (since 1992) and Argentina (since 1997), offering workshops on the use of art as an auxiliary to curricular teaching and group coexistence. For example, she visited school No. 22 of Mendoza Grande, Florida Department, with rural teachers of Soriano in 2009, the Scuola Italiana of Montevideo, and the Integral School of Solymar, Canelones. She worked in Argentina, in rural school No. 21 of Roque Pérez in 2011, and in Gálvez in 2012. She held a workshop at the First Artistic Education Biennial in Maldonado in 2012.

In October 2012 she was in the Bilingual School Silos de Cañuelas, located in the town of Alejandro Petión, with a proposal that was part of a school project of art and values.

She toured 14 cities in Argentina that hosted the 2014 Mandálica Tour, which ended in Rosario with an artistic encounter and workshops on the mandala technique at La Fluvial, located in the National Flag Park, to paint a collective mural with the children in a free activity, as well as workshops for adults.

== Other activities ==
In 1989 Páez taught art courses for children on Channel 5 and the following year on Channel 4 with René Jolivet. In 1991 she worked with Carlos Giacosa on Channel 12, interviewing several artists. In 1996 she decorated for the play Pepito Superstar with her drawings.

In addition to touring schools with the sponsorship of Tersuave, Agó Páez Vilaró directs three institutes in Argentina where art workshops are held. She carries out different activities, especially in the Rosario region, where her mother comes from.

She is an illustrator of books, such as Atrapasueños by Helen Velando and La hora de las magnolias by Graciela Genta. In 1997 she illustrated the book La Edad del Deseo by Mariela Maya; in 1998 the book Una luz en mi corazón, mi camino hacia el Islam by Gabriela González and El viaje de Sara, by Martha Cash; in 1999 the book Mujer musulmana es un ángel de luz by Gabriela González. In 2000 she illustrated the book Tanic Attack by her sister Beba Páez and Mensajes de ángeles by Graciela Iriondo.

As a sculptor, in 1998 she donated the piece Por una Cabeza for the auction to benefit the Casa de Gardel center for rehabilitation and recreation. She also designed the sculpture that is located in the Rambla de Atlántida, in December 2014, as a tribute to her father, named Un sol para Atlántida. The original idea was that of Páez Vilaró himself, who proposed incorporating his landscaping into the Rambla de Atlántida, and after his death, the Canary Islands decided to pay homage to him with a public space in his memory and an evocative sculpture. The sculpture was made with the financial support of the company Gerdau Laisa SA. It consists of iron reinforcement for the foundations and bases, and weighs 20 tons. The Ministry of Tourism and Sports allocated money for the paving, lighting, and urban equipment of the public space. The Municipality of Canelones carried out the project and execution of the public space that houses the sol.

She has been a jury member of plastic arts competitions such as those organized by COFAC.

== Publications ==
- Buscando mi estrella. Por el camino de Santiago de Compostela (2001), presented at the Legislative Palace by Herrera Productions and the Spanish embassy
- El Mandala. Mi regreso al centro, Ediciones Rosgal, Montevideo (2006), a book of circular sheets

== Recognition ==
In 1990 she selected her works for cards of Aldeas Infantiles. In 1994 she obtained the prize of specially invited artist in the meeting made by lturria and Vázquez in Carrasco Park. In 1999 she was invited to participate in the Juanicó contest. In 2000 she was invited by Mrs. Mercedes Menafra to be a juror of the Uruguayan craft contest "Hecho Acá".

On 10 December 2007, the Uruguayan Post made a special issue for the seal "Mandala de Agó Páez – Marine Mammal Research and Conservation", with a value of 37 Uruguayan pesos and a print run of 15,000 units, assembled by Gabriel Casas, in the category Mandala.

She presides over the plastic item category in the short story and plastic contest "Pequeños talentos del Uruguay", among the schoolchildren of the country.

In 2013, the University Center of Rivera made a printed publication with the name of Agó Páez Vilaró, where it recorded the activities and productions generated during her stay at school No. 111 of the Paso de la Estiva.

In 2014, she was invited to paint the ball of the Uruguay national football team, which until then had been done by her deceased father, as a way to continue the tradition. She painted a blue sun on the surface of the ball and as many yellow stars as players, whose last initial accompanies each of them.
