= Apache: The Life of Carlos Tevez =

2019 Spanish-language television series

- Genre: Drama
- Starring: Balthazar Murillo; Sofía Gala; Vanesa González
- Country of origin: Argentina
- Original language: Spanish
- No. of seasons: 1
- No. of episodes: 8

Original release
- Release: August 16, 2019

Apache: The Life of Carlos Tevez (Spanish: Apache: La vida de Carlos Tevez) is an eight-part 2019 Argentine television series starring Balthazar Murillo, Sofía Gala and Vanesa González. The plot revolves around Carlos Tevez's rise as a football player amid the conditions in Argentina's Ejército de Los Andes, better known as Fuerte Apache.

It was released on August 16, 2019 on Netflix.

== Cast ==
- Balthazar Murillo as Carlos Tevez
- Vanesa González as Adriana Martínez
- Sofía Gala as Fabiana Martínez
- Alberto Ajaka as Segundo Tevez
- Diego Pérez as Ramón Madonni
- Matías Recalt as Danilo Sánchez
- Gregorio Barrios as Hernán
- Fernando Contiagiani García as Jorge
- Osqui Guzmán as Chito
- Diego Gallardo as Tiví
- Julián Larquier Tellarini as Cochi
- Tamara Ayelén Arias as China
- Yesica Gilkmán as Anabella
- Patricio Contreras as Chacho
- Roberto Vallejos as Hugo
- Fiona Pereira as Mariela
- Juan Pablo Burgos as Kiru
- Mariela Acosta as Pascuala
- Juan Ignacio Cané as Professor Liniers
- Nicolás Gentile as Sebastián
- Pablo García Plandolit as El Tranza (Cachucha)

== Release ==
Apache: The Life of Carlos Tevez is scheduled to be released on August 16, 2019 on Netflix streaming.
