= Matías Recalt =

Argentine actor (born 2001)

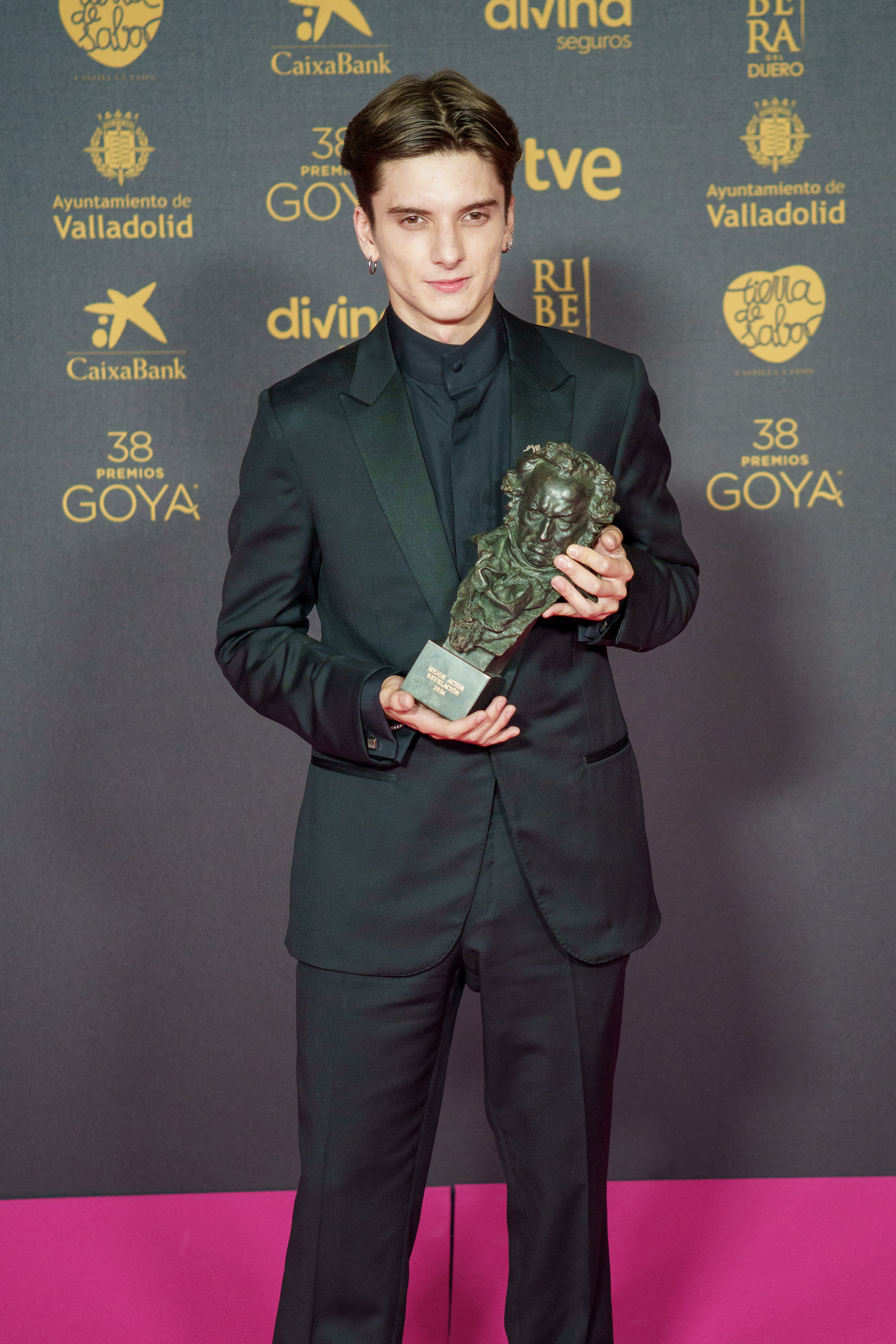
- Recalt holding his Goya Award for Best New Actor
- Born: 14 September 2001 (age 25)
- Occupation: Actor

Matías Recalt (born 14 September 2001) is an Argentine actor. He gained recognition for his portrayal of Roberto Canessa in the 2023 film Society of the Snow.

== Early life and career ==
Matías Recalt was born on 14 September 2001. He was raised in Ingeniero Maschwitz, Buenos Aires Province. He made his television debut as an actor in the 2019 series Apache: The Life of Carlos Tevez, portraying Carlos Tevez's friend Danilo. He went on to feature in other television series such as Argentina, tierra de amor y venganza (2019) and Planners (2023). He landed a big screen debut in Ciegos (2019). He earned recognition for his portrayal of Roberto Canessa in Society of the Snow (2023), for which he also earned the Goya Award for Best New Actor.

== Filmography ==
=== Film ===
Year	Title	Role	Notes	Ref.
2019	Ciegos	Primo		
2023	Society of the Snow	Roberto Canessa		

=== Television ===
Year	Title	Role	Notes	Ref.
2019	Apache: The Life of Carlos Tevez	Danilo "el Uruguayo"		
2019	Argentina, tierra de amor y venganza	Gerónimo		
2023	Planners	Javier Gutiérrez		

== Accolades ==
Year	Award	Category	Work	Result	Ref.
2024	79th CEC Medals	Best New Actor	Society of the Snow	Won	
2024	38th Goya Awards	Best New Actor	Society of the Snow	Won	
2024	11th Platino Awards	Best Supporting Actor	Society of the Snow	Nominated	
