= Society of the Snow =

2023 film by J. A. Bayona

- Netflix release poster
- Spanish: La sociedad de la nieve
- Directed by: J. A. Bayona
- Screenplay by: J. A. Bayona; Bernat Vilaplana; Jaime Marques; Nicolás Casariego
- Based on: La sociedad de la nieve by Pablo Vierci
- Produced by: Belén Atienza; Sandra Hermida; J. A. Bayona
- Starring: Enzo Vogrincic; Matías Recalt; Agustín Pardella; Felipe González Otaño; Luciano Chatton; Valentino Alonso; Francisco Romero; Agustín Berruti; Andy Pruss; Simón Hempe; Juan Caruso; Esteban Bigliardi; Rocco Posca; Esteban Kukuriczka; Rafael Federman; Manuela Olivera; Agustín Della Corte; Tomas Wolf
- Cinematography: Pedro Luque
- Edited by: Jaume Martí; Andrés Gil
- Music by: Michael Giacchino
- Production companies: Misión de Audaces Films; El Arriero Films; Netflix
- Distributed by: Netflix; Tripictures (Note: Under an agreement with Netflix, Tripictures handled theatrical distribution in Spain.)
- Release dates: 9 September 2023 (Venice); 15 December 2023 (Spain); 22 December 2023 (United States); 4 January 2024 (Netflix)
- Running time: 144 minutes
- Countries: Spain; United States
- Language: Spanish
- Budget: €60 million (USD$65 million)

Society of the Snow (Spanish: La sociedad de la nieve) is a 2023 survival drama film directed by J. A. Bayona and based on Pablo Vierci's 2008 book of the same name. It is the third feature film about the 1972 Andes flight disaster. A co-production between Spain and the United States, the film has a cast composed of Uruguayan and Argentine actors, most of whom are newcomers, and was shot mainly in Sierra Nevada, Spain.

The film closed the 80th Venice International Film Festival in an Out of Competition slot. It was theatrically released in Uruguay on 13 December 2023, in Spain on 15 December 2023, and in the US on 22 December 2023, before streaming on Netflix on 4 January 2024.

Society of the Snow received positive reviews. It won 12 awards including Best Picture and Best Director at the 38th Goya Awards, 6 awards at the 11th Platino Awards, and was nominated for 2 Academy Awards.

== Plot ==
On 13 October 1972, Uruguayan Air Force Flight 571, chartered by an Uruguayan rugby football team (the Old Christians Club) and their supporters, to take them to a game in Santiago, Chile, crashes into a glacier in the heart of the Andes mountains. Of the 45 passengers on board, 29 survive the initial crash, although more would die from injury, disease, and an avalanche over the following weeks. Trapped in one of the most inaccessible and hostile environments on the planet, the survivors are forced to resort to cannibalism of those who had already died in order to stay alive. However, rather than turn against each other, the survivors draw upon the cooperative teamwork they learned through playing rugby at the Stella Maris College and their shared Catholic faith, in order to escape the mountains.

== Cast ==
- Enzo Vogrincic as Numa Turcatti
- Matías Recalt as Roberto Canessa
- Agustín Pardella as Nando Parrado
- Tomas Wolf as Gustavo Zerbino
- Diego Vegezzi as Marcelo Pérez del Castillo
- Esteban Kukuriczka as Adolfo "Fito" Strauch
- Francisco Romero as Daniel Fernández Strauch
- Rafael Federman as Eduardo Strauch
- Felipe González Otaño as Carlitos Páez
- Agustín Della Corte as Antonio "Tintín" Vizintín
- Valentino Alonso as Alfredo "Pancho" Delgado
- Simón Hempe as José Luis "Coche" Inciarte
- Fernando Contigiani García as Arturo Nogueira
- Benjamín Segura as Rafael "el Vasco" Echavarren
- Rocco Posca as Ramón "Moncho" Sabella
- Luciano Chatton as Pedro Algorta
- Agustín Berruti as Bobby François
- Juan Caruso as Álvaro Mangino
- Andy Pruss as Roy Harley
- Santiago Vaca Narvaja as Daniel Maspons
- Esteban Bigliardi as Javier Methol
- Paula Baldini as Liliana Methol
- Federico Aznarez as Enrique Platero
- Alfonsina Carrocio as Susana Parrado
- Silvia Giselle Pereyra as Eugenia Parrado
- Pablo Tate as Francisco Nicola
- Virginia Kaufmann as Esther Nicola
- Felipe Ramusio as Diego Storm
- Blas Polidori as Gustavo Nicolich
- Emanuel Parga as Carlos Roque
- Iair Said as Julio César Ferradas
- Mariano Rochman as Ramón Martínez
- Juan Diego Eirea as Juan Carlos Menéndez
- Jaime James Louta (LOUTA) as Gastón Costemalle
- Lautaro Bakir as Julio Martínez Lamas
- Jerónimo Bosia as Francisco "Pancho" Abal
- Lucas Mascareña as Fernando Vázquez
- Julián Bedino as Guido Magri
- Toto Rovito as Alexis Hounié
- Federico Formento as Daniel Shaw
- Tea Alberti as Graciela Augusto de Mariani
- Agustín Lain as Carlos Valeta
- Francisco Bereny as Felipe Maquirriaín
- Juan José Marco as Ovidio Ramírez
- Carlos "Carlitos" Páez as his father, Carlos Páez Vilaró
- Maximiliano de la Cruz as Dante Lagurara

== Production ==
=== Development ===
Uruguayan journalist Pablo Vierci grew up, went to school, and played rugby with many of the passengers on the plane, ultimately writing the 2008 book about the crash, La Sociedad de la Nieve. Bayona discovered Vierci's book while conducting research for his 2012 film The Impossible, and bought the rights for the book when he finished filming that movie. The filmmakers recorded more than 100 hours of interviews with all of the living survivors. The actors had contact with the survivors and the families of the victims.

Bayona struggled to find funding for 10 years, stating that the "major problem was the fact it was in Spanish with a big budget, which is not the big budget of an American film. So it's been hard because somehow the market doesn't accept this kind of product." Ultimately, Netflix optioned and green-lit the film for Bayona.

=== Filming ===
Principal photography took place in Sierra Nevada, Spain; Montevideo, Uruguay; Chile and Argentina, including the actual crash site in the Andes. Filming in Sierra Nevada lasted from 10 January to 29 April 2022. Filming in Uruguay concluded in late July 2022, and the production continued in Madrid. Production took the total of 138 shooting days, with its budget reported to be over €65 million.

In August 2021, the second unit, headed by Alejandro Fadel, Argentine director of Murder Me, Monster, filmed landscapes in Chile for reference in on-set virtual production and post-production. In Sierra Nevada, the production was challenged by a scarcity of snow, and by the Saharan Air Layer which covered the mountains with orange dust. Three replicas of the fuselage wreckage were used: one was placed in a hangar built on a parking lot, another was buried in artificial snow and supported by a hydraulic crane that allowed for it to be moved, and the third was placed above a tarn at an altitude of 3,000 m (9,800 ft). In the hangar, a 30-metre-tall screen displayed the second unit's footage of the Andes. The third unit was tasked with more dangerous mountain shots. The three units consisted of around 300 workers.

David Martí and Montse Ribé, Academy Award–winning special effects makeup artists of Pan's Labyrinth, created prosthetic corpses and wounds. Post-production was planned to last about five months involving 300 personnel. Vierci, who served as an associate producer, visited the set in Sierra Nevada.

Bayona showed an early version of the film to one of the survivors, José Luis "Coche" Inciarte, before he died in July 2023. The 14 remaining survivors saw the film one or two months prior to the premiere.

== Release ==
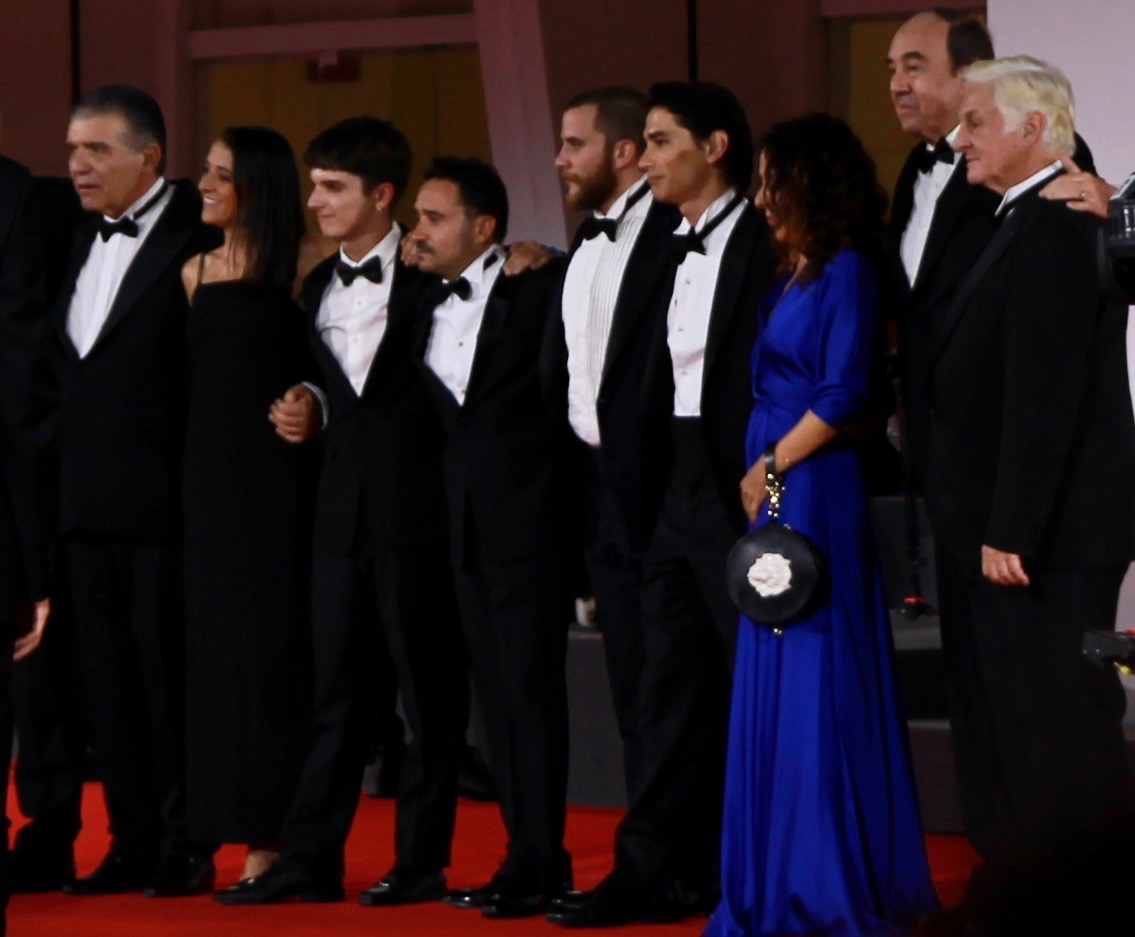
J. A. Bayona, Carlos Páez Rodríguez, Fernando Parrado and Roberto Canessa and cast members of the film at the Venice prémiere in 2023

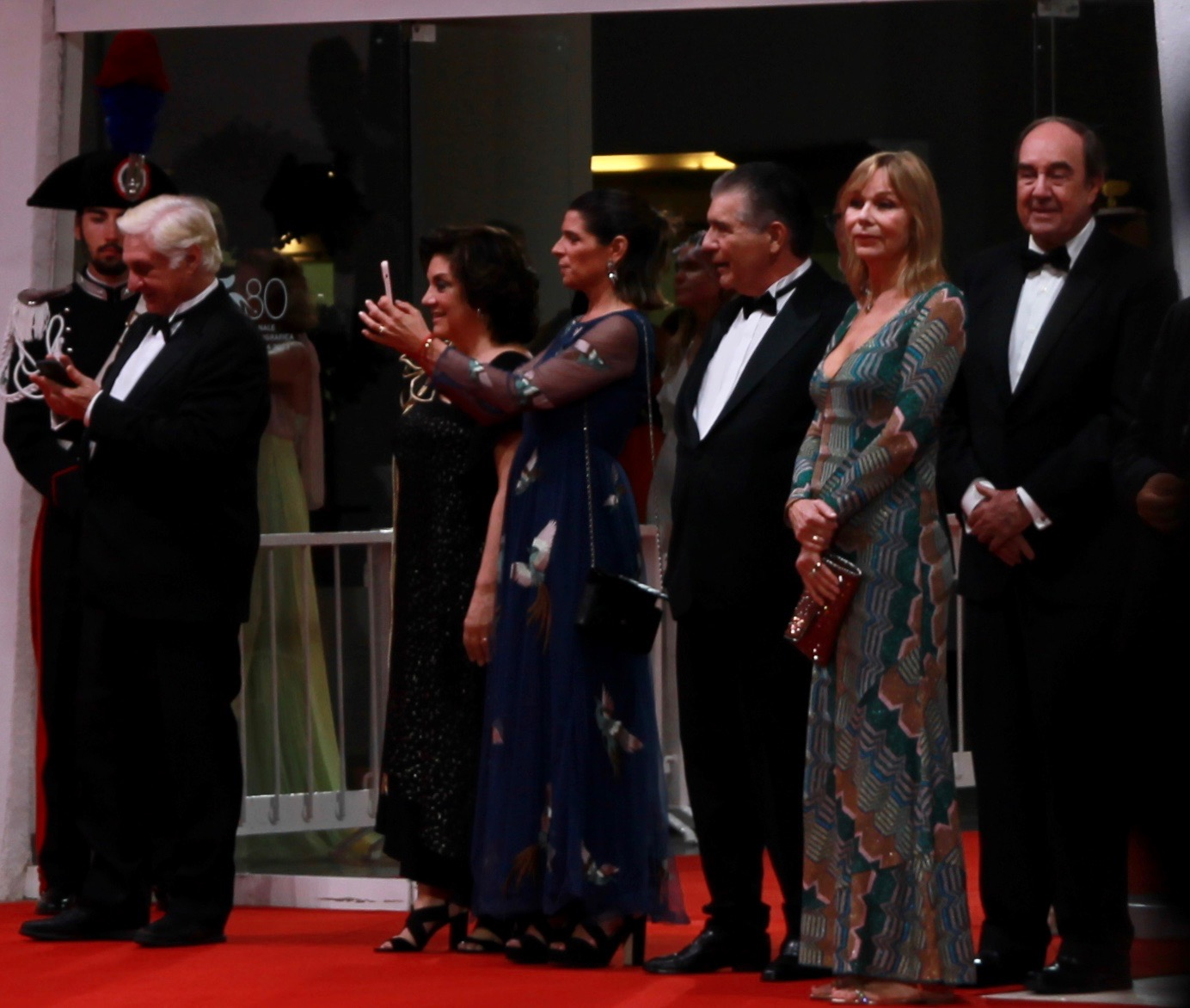
Roberto Canessa, Fernando Parrado, Carlos Páez Rodríguez, and family members attend the Venice premiere.

The film was set as the 80th Venice International Film Festival's closing film, with a world premiere out-of-competition screening at the Palazzo del Cinema slated for 9 September 2023, following the festival's awards ceremony. It was selected to screen in the Perlak section at the 71st San Sebastián International Film Festival in September 2023. It also screened in the Out of Competition section at the 56th Sitges Film Festival, and at the 2023 AFI Fest.

The film was programmed for a technical screening run from 20 to 26 October 2023 in the Cine Aragonia of Zaragoza. Distributed by Tripictures, it received a Spanish theatrical release on 15 December 2023 and was released in US theaters on 22 December 2023.

Society of the Snow was released as a Netflix original on 4 January 2024 and reached Netflix's list of Top 10 Non-English films. In its first 11 days, it had 51 million views on Netflix. Between its debut and the end of June, the film amassed 103 million views, making it the third most-watched Netflix film for the first half of 2024, behind Damsel and Lift.

== Reception ==
=== Critical response ===
On the review aggregator website Rotten Tomatoes, 90% of 159 critics' reviews are positive, with an average rating of 7.9/10. The website's consensus reads: "Society of the Snow brings masterful technical skill to bear on its tale of real-life tragedy, but none of that spectacle comes at the expense of its simple, powerful message." Metacritic, which uses a weighted average, assigned the film a score of 72 out of 100, based on 33 critics, indicating "generally favorable" reviews.

Roxana Hadadi of Vulture states that the film's "philosophical script and unshakeable performances" both "elevates" it and "pushes it into transcendence ... not since Martin Scorsese's Silence has a film so effectively asked us to consider whether faith is benevolence or a blight." Pete Hammond of Deadline suggests that Bayona's interpretation of the crash is "ultimately a spiritual journey on many levels, focusing on the human will to overcome the worst of circumstances," and that it is "a story of how humanity comes together for each other."

Wendy Ide of ScreenDaily argues that Bayona's "adaptation of this much-filmed story is elevated by bracingly muscular action sequences," and that what sets it apart "is the decision not to focus entirely on the survivors. Bayona is at pains to ensure that the voices that are foregrounded are not necessarily those of the crash victims who eventually make it home." Guy Lodge of Variety says that the film is composed of an "unstarry, fully Spanish-speaking cast" and is a "brawnily effective tear-jerker." He also says that it has a "nuanced, non-denominational spiritualism, which further distinguishes it from the more straightforwardly inspirational adventure brief of the previous film." Carlos Boyero of El País found it was "a credible and emotional depiction of the horrible experience of the accident".

Teté Ribeiro of the Folha de S.Paulo insists that the film is "not for ... weak stomachs." The Guardian 's Peter Bradshaw said that while it is "a fervent film, heartfelt and shot with passion and flair," at the same time "the strange, dark mystery of the Andes case is overlooked by Bayona; the weird suspicion that the experience has made the survivors "post-human"." David Rooney of The Hollywood Reporter found the film to be "uneven but ultimately effective", told "with authenticity and chilling realism, with emotion but without sensationalism." Both Hadadi and Rooney underscore the existential nature of the film.

Jorge Majfud, the author of Cine político latinoamericano, argues that the film must be analyzed with a "critical look", suggesting that in addition to this story, there are "countless tragedies that decided the course of global history," which are ignored in cinema. Among the rare completely negative reviews, Luís Miguel Oliveira of Público states that "they survived. Cinema didn't," and considers Society of the Snow to be "a bad American film made by Europeans."

=== Response from survivors ===
In a 2024 op-ed, two of the survivors, Roberto Canessa and Gustavo Zerbino state that they "and others have been telling our story for half a century, but the filmmaker J. A. Bayona has captured it in ways that we find inspiring and fresh all over again. In many respects, Society of the Snow violates a well-worn tenet of all drama: it is a film free of an antagonist. Yes, it is a classic man-versus-nature narrative, but there is no evil present in the film. It is a film free of cynicism, brimming with pure humanity, accessible to a wide spectrum of viewers. It is a film that has broken the boundaries of language with the universal message that everyone has the immeasurable potential to rise to the occasion, thanks, in great part, to the alliances we can and should forge as we share this planet together."

=== Frank Marshall and Alive ===
Frank Marshall and Bayona had previously worked together on the 2018 film Jurassic World: Fallen Kingdom. After watching Society of the Snow, Marshall (who had directed the 1993 film Alive, which also depicted the Uruguayan Air Force Flight 571 crash and its aftermath) sent Bayona an email saying "how much he loved" the film. In an interview, Bayona said that Alive "created an impact on a whole generation and, somehow, that film also is the product of its time, you know. That was shot in a studio, in a Hollywood studio. Shot in English. Maybe [it] was too soon, especially for the families of the deceased, to be part of a movie ... But it was a very effective film at the time. I think that both films complement each other somehow."

=== Accolades ===
Society of the Snow won 12 awards including Best Picture and Best Director at the 38th Goya Awards, 6 awards at the 11th Platino Awards, and was nominated for 2 Academy Awards.

== Documentary ==
Beyond Society (Más allá de la sociedad) is an upcoming 2026 documentary series.

== See also ==
- Survive! (1976 film)
- Alive (1993 film)
- Cannibalism in popular culture
- List of Spanish films of 2023
