= Casapueblo =

Building in Uruguay

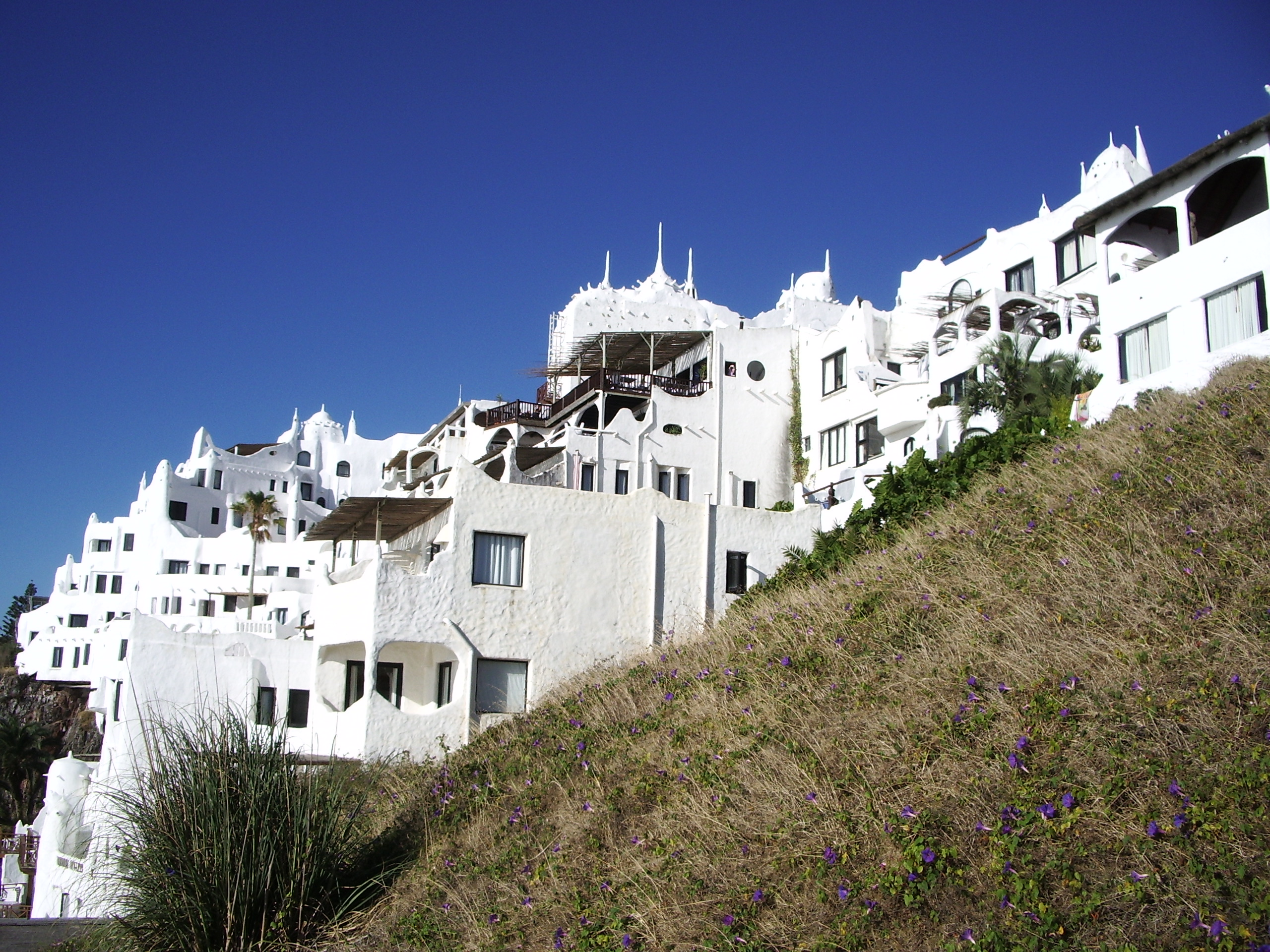
- Casapueblo

- Location within Uruguay

General information
- Location: Maldonado, Punta Ballena (Whale Point)
- Coordinates: 34°54′11″S 55°2′32″W
- Opening: 1960
- Owner: Carlos Páez Vilaró

Design and construction
- Developer: Carlos Páez Vilaró

Other information
- Number of rooms: 12
- Number of suites: 56
- Number of restaurants: 1

Website
- www.clubhotelcasapueblo.com

Casapueblo is a building constructed by the Uruguayan artist Carlos Páez Vilaró. It is located in Punta Ballena, 13 kilometres (8 mi) from Punta del Este, Uruguay. Initially, it was the artist's summer home and workshop, and includes a museum, an art gallery, a cafeteria and a hotel in its facilities. It was the permanent residence of its creator, who worked and spent his last days there.

== History ==
Casapueblo began to be built in 1958 around a wooden box made with planks found on the coast, called La Pionera (The Pioneer), by Carlos Páez Vilaró. This box was his first atelier. Casapueblo was designed with a style that can be compared to the houses on the Mediterranean coast of Santorini, but the artist used to refer to the hornero's nest, a typical bird of Uruguay, when referring to this type of construction. The building, which took 36 years to complete, has thirteen floors with terraces that allow an optimal views of the sunset over the waters of the Atlantic ocean.

It houses a tribute to Carlos Miguel, the artist's son and one of the sixteen survivors, all of whom were Uruguayan, of flight 571 of the Uruguayan Air Force plane crash, which crashed in the Andes on October 13, 1972.

Carlos Páez Vilaró has received some of the most important personalities from the cultural and political field, such as the writer Isabel Allende, the ambassador Mercedes Vicente, the sexologist Mariela Castro, the artist Vinícius de Moraes, among others.

=== Construction ===
The building was built of whitewashed cement and stucco. It was built in an artisanal way and without previous plans, in the form of a maze, does not have straight lines inside and the color white predominates. It was expanded and modified from year to year as a residence in "unpredictable ways".

"La construí [Casapueblo] como si se tratara de una escultura habitable, sin planos, sobre todo a instancias de mi entusiasmo. Cuando la municipalidad me pidió hace poco los planos que no tenía, un arquitecto amigo tuvo que pasarse un mes estudiando la forma de descifrarla."

"I built it [Casapueblo] as if it were a habitable sculpture, without plans, especially at the instigation of my enthusiasm. When the municipality recently asked me for the plans that I did not have, an architect friend had to spend a month studying how to decipher it."

— Carlos Páez Vilaró.

== Accommodation ==
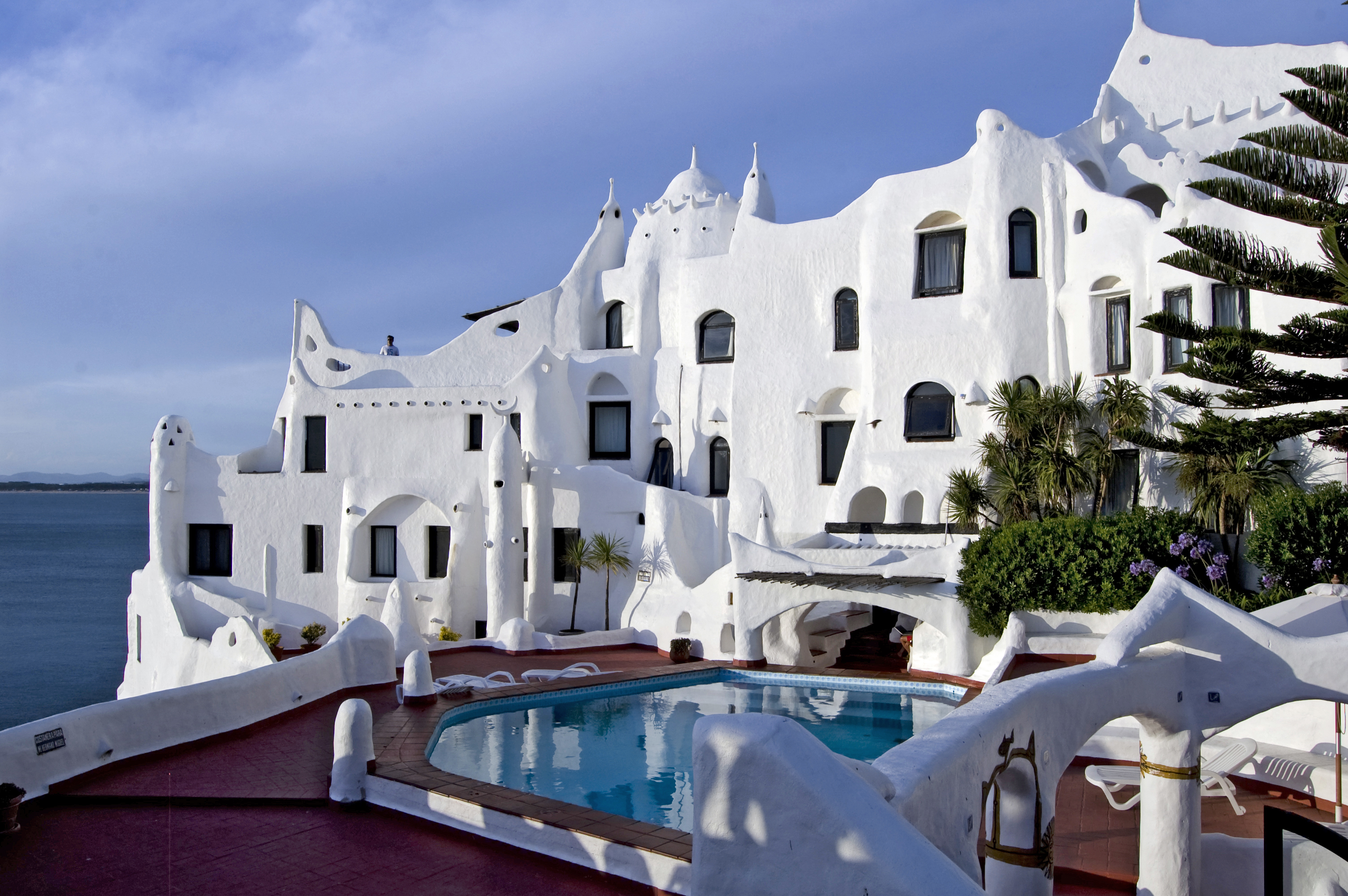
Casapueblo.

To 2020 the Casapueblo Hotel has 20 rooms and suites and 50 apartments, hot pool, sauna, bar, and restaurant. The high season is from December to February. The apartment hotel called Hotel Casapueblo or Club Hotel Casapueblo has a restaurant called Las Terrazas (The Terraces) that follows the style of the original construction.

== Museum ==
In the main dome of Casapueblo are the museum and workshop, where one can see part of the work of the late painter, potter, sculptor, muralist, writer, composer and builder Carlos Páez Vilaró. It has four exhibition rooms: Nicolás Guillén Room, Pablo Picasso Room, Rafael Squirru Room, Sala José Gómez-Sicre, projection room, the Terrace of the Mermaid, the Mirador del Hipcampo (Hippocampus Lookout), the Taberna del Rayo Verde (Tavern of the Green Ray) cafeteria and a boutique. The museum can be visited every day from 10 am to 6 pm.

Every afternoon since 1994 the Sun Ceremony has been held on the museum's terraces. Minutes before sunset, the artist's voice from a recording, dedicates a poem to the sun to bid farewell to it.

== See also ==
- Nando Parrado
