= Jorge Páez Vilaró =

Uruguayan artist (1922–1994)

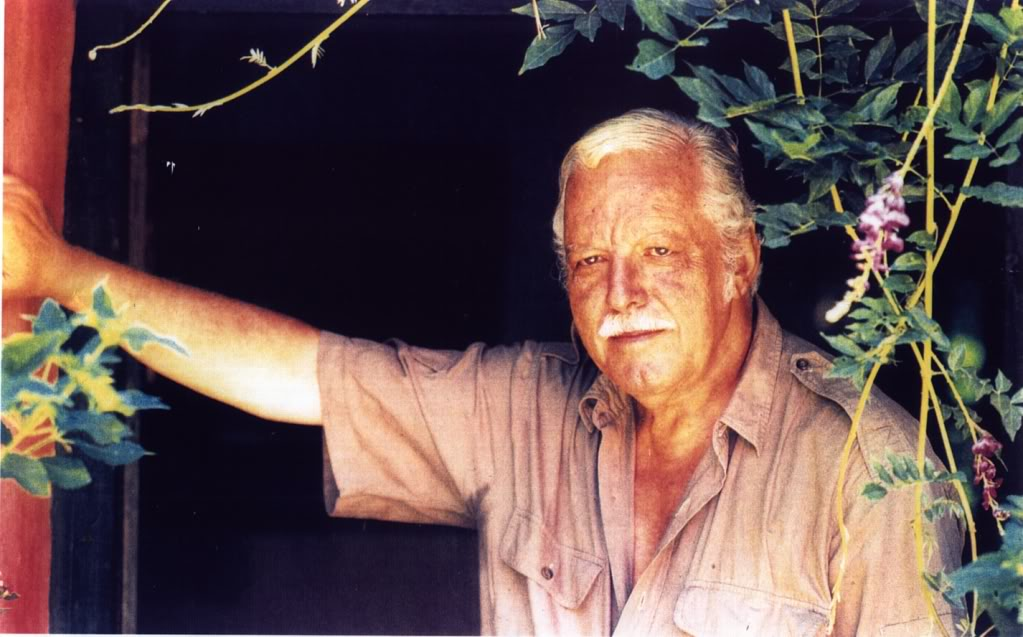
- Born: 15 July 1922; Montevideo, Uruguay
- Died: 2 May 1994 (aged 71); Punta del Este, Uruguay
- Known for: Painting
- Relatives: Carlos Páez Vilaró (brother)

Jorge Páez Vilaró (15 July 1922 – 2 May 1994) was a Uruguayan artist, muralist, and sculptor. Known for his vibrant and eclectic works, Páez Vilaró's art reflected his deep appreciation for Latin American culture, identity, and traditions. As an influential figure in modern Latin American art, he worked across various mediums and left a legacy of public and private artworks that celebrate the richness of regional heritage.

== Early life and education ==
Jorge Páez Vilaró was born on 15 July 1922 in Montevideo, Uruguay. His younger brother, Carlos Páez Vilaró, was a well-known painter, sculptor, and composer. The cultural diversity of Montevideo became a strong influence. Because Jorge pursued no formal artistic education, he was largely self-taught and honed his skills through extensive travels and interactions with local artisans and contemporary artists in Latin America.

His early works drew inspiration from the natural landscapes and indigenous cultures of Uruguay, themes that were also prevalent in his later career.

== Career ==
Páez Vilaró's artistic career spanned several decades, during which he became known for his approach to modern art. He explored various forms of expression, including painting, sculpture, and mural work, combining elements of abstraction with motifs from Latin American folklore. His work often showed an intersection of tradition and modernity, making him a significant contributor to the region's artistic identity.

== Murals and public art ==
Páez Vilaró is known for his large-scale murals and public art installations. Many of these works were designed to be accessible and reflective of the communities in which they were created. His murals incorporated bold geometric shapes and vibrant colors, often telling stories of local history and cultural pride.

- Museo de Arte Americano in Punta del Este: Páez Vilaró's contributions to this museum include many of his iconic murals, showing the interplay of modernist aesthetics with traditional Latin American themes.
- His public sculptures in Montevideo and Punta del Este remain landmarks, admired for their expressive designs and cultural significance.

== Style and influences ==
Páez Vilaró's use of vibrant colors, dynamic compositions, and symbolic imagery set his work apart. He was influenced by the regional landscapes of Uruguay, pre-Columbian art, and the burgeoning modernist movement in Latin America. His works often highlighted themes of cultural identity, resilience, and the interconnectedness of past and present.

Art historian Nelson Di Maggio noted that Páez Vilaró's style was both innovative and deeply personal, reflecting his lifelong quest to bridge traditional forms with contemporary expression.

== Exhibitions and recognition ==
Páez Vilaró exhibited extensively across Latin America, Europe, and the United States. His works were featured in both solo and group exhibitions, gaining recognition for their boldness and authenticity. He participated in cultural festivals and exhibitions in Argentina, where his works were celebrated for their modernist approach. National Museum of Visual Arts (Uruguay) continues to preserve and showcase his contributions to Uruguayan art.

== Legacy ==
Páez Vilaró died in Punta del Este on May 2, 1994. Despite being less internationally recognized than his brother Carlos, his work is considered a cornerstone of modern Uruguayan art. His dedication to exploring and expressing Latin American identity through modernist techniques has left an indelible mark on the region's cultural history.
