= Carlos Páez Vilaró =

Uruguayan artist (1923–2014)

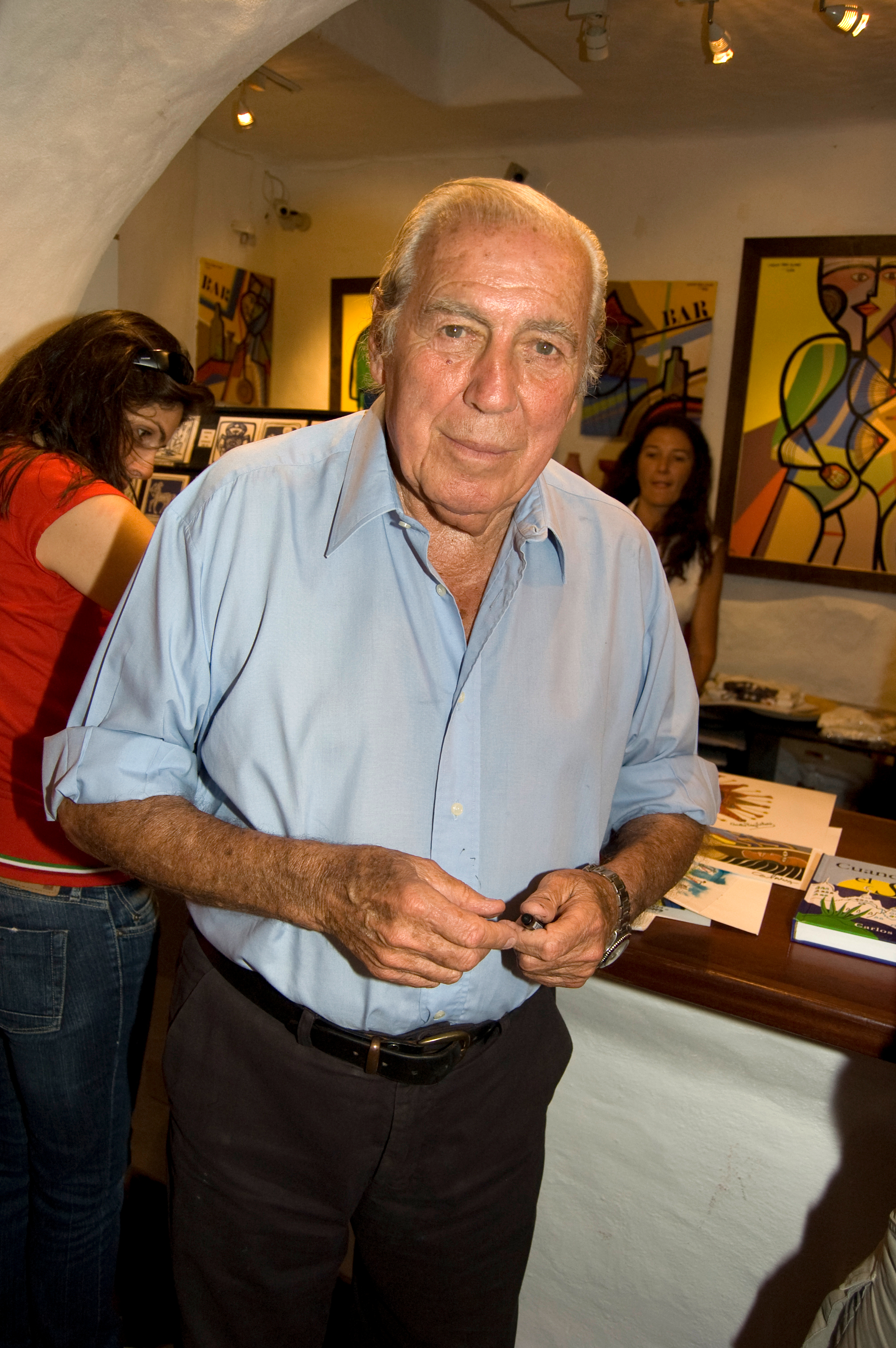
- Carlos Páez Vilaró in 2009.
- Born: 1 November 1923; Montevideo, Uruguay
- Died: 24 February 2014 (aged 90); Punta Ballena, Uruguay
- Occupations: Painter, potter, sculptor, muralist, writer, composer, constructora.
- Spouse(s): Madelón Rodríguez Gómez (1955–61) Annette Deussen (m. 1989)
- Children: Carlos Páez Rodríguez, Mercedes, Agó, Sebastián, Florencio, and Alejandro.
- Relatives: Jorge Páez Vilaró (brother)
- Website: www.carlospaezvilaro.com

Carlos Páez Vilaró (1 November 1923 – 24 February 2014) was a Uruguayan abstract artist, painter, potter, sculptor, muralist, writer, composer and constructor. He took an active role in the search for survivors of the 1972 crash of Uruguayan Air Force Flight 571 in the Andes, as his son Carlos Páez Rodríguez was a passenger.

== Life and work ==
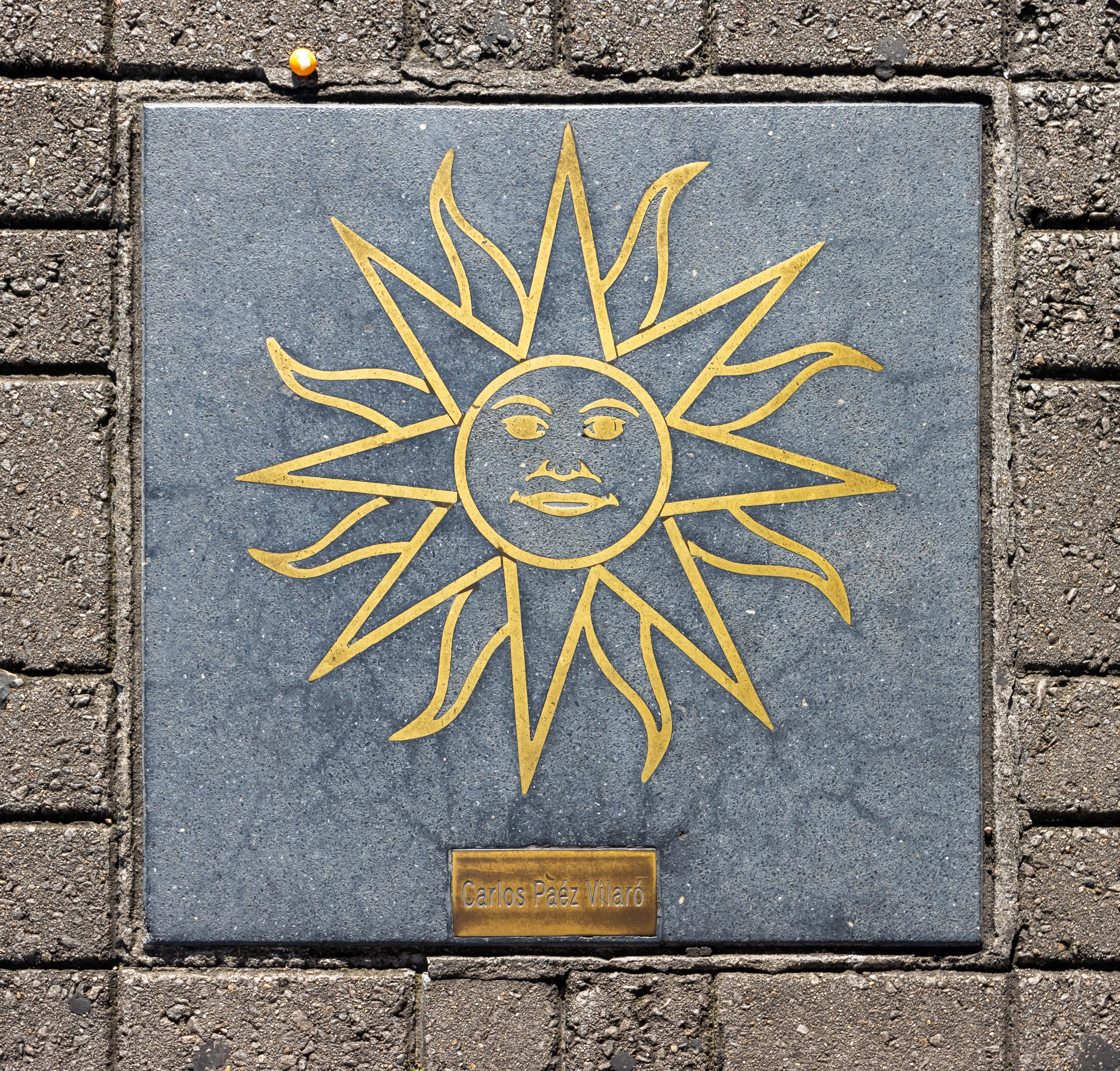
Plaque at the Suns of the Paseo de los Soles, Montevideo, Uruguay

Carlos Páez Vilaró was born in Montevideo, Uruguay, in 1923. He took up drawing in 1939 and relocated to Buenos Aires, where he worked as a printing apprentice in the industrial Barracas section of the Argentine capital. Returning to Montevideo in the late 1940s, he developed an interest in Afro-Uruguayan culture. Settling in Montevideo's primarily black tenement of "Mediomundo" ("Half-World"), he studied the Candombé and Comparsa dances characteristic to the culture.

He composed numerous musical pieces in the two genres and conducted an orchestra. His group's congas and bongos were decorated with their leader's own thematic drawings, as well. His interest in the culture later led him to Brazil, home to the western hemisphere's largest population of African descent. Páez Vilaró was invited to exhibit some of this work by the Director of the Modern Art Museum of Paris, Jean Cassou, in 1956. He traveled to Dakar, Senegal, later that year – his first visit to Africa.

He was one of the "Grupo de los 8", a movement of Uruguayan artists formed in 1958 together with Oscar García Reino, Miguel Ángel Pareja, Raúl Pavlovsky, Lincoln Presno, Américo Sposito, Alfredo Testoni and Julio Verdie in order to promote new tendencies in painting. In 1960 they were invited by art critic Rafael Squirru to join the international exhibition at the Buenos Aires Museum of Modern Art (of which he was creator and first director) with artists such as Willem de Kooning, Roger Hilton and Lucio Fontana. The experimental tendencies of the Grupo de los 8 have since gained a place of unquestionable relevance not only in the panorama of Uruguayan art but also at an international level, some of their works forming part of museums and collections worldwide.

Increasingly well-known, Páez Vilaró was commissioned in 1959 to create a mural for a tunnel connecting a new annex to the Organization of American States' Washington, DC headquarters, the Pan American Union building. Originally intended to be no more than 15 metres (49 ft) in length, the completed mural (Roots of Peace) measured 155 metres (509 ft) long and nearly 2 metres (6 ft 7 in) high when unveiled in 1960. Extensive damage from humidity prompted the artist to repaint the mural in 1975.

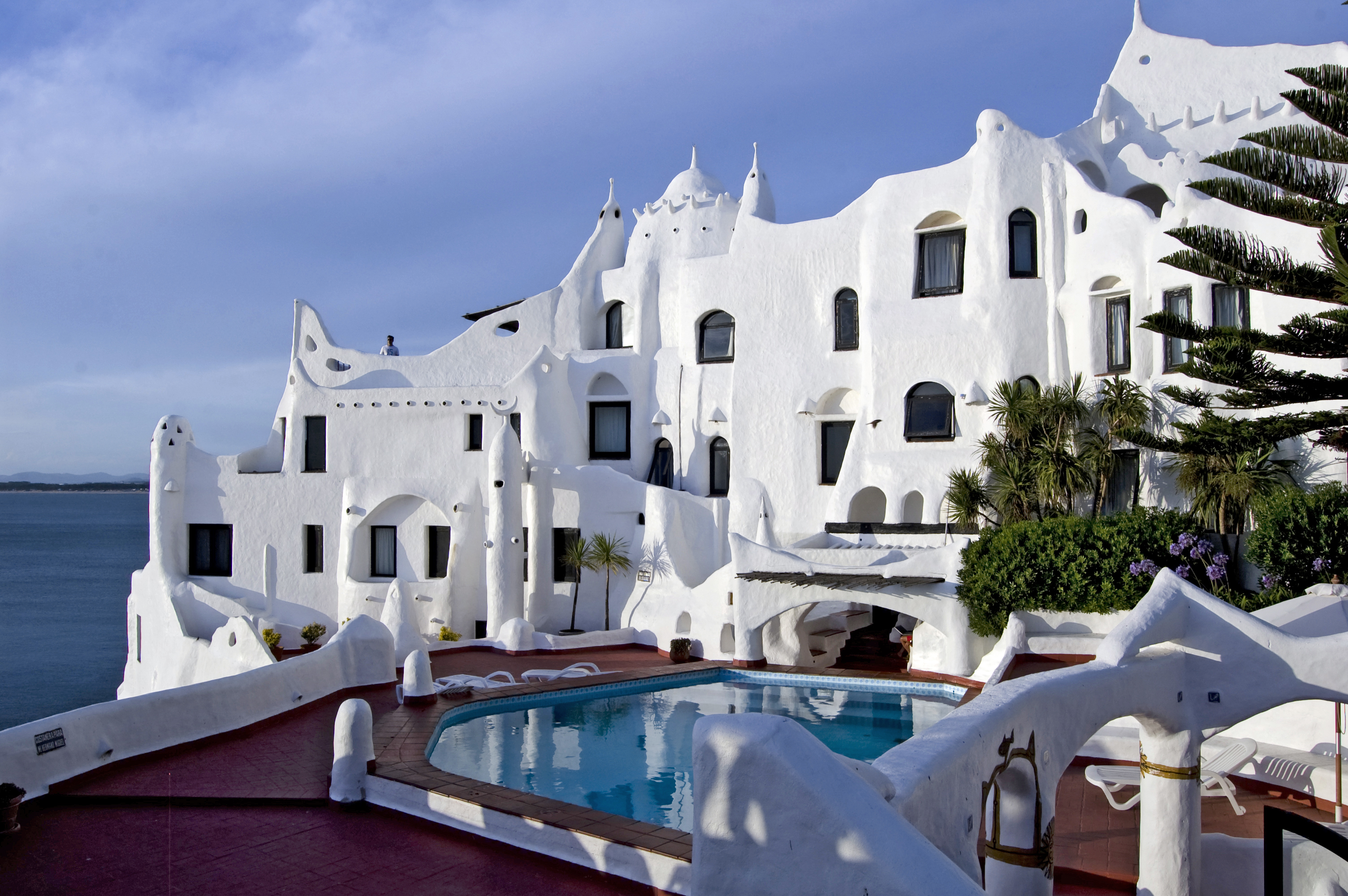
Casapueblo, his "livable sculpture" and best-known creation near Punta del Este, has been a leading tourist destination in Uruguay since the late 1960s.

He purchased a sea-front property on eastern Uruguay's scenic, then-desolate Punta Ballena in 1958, building a small, wooden lodge that over time became "Casapueblo" ("House-Village"). The sprawling compound, a whitewashed cement citadel reminiscent of Mykonos, was built in stages by the artist to resemble the mud nests created by the region's native hornero birds, and became his home, atelier and museum. Though he resided in Casapueblo - his "livable sculpture" - by 1968, Páez Vilaró continued to add on to the structure, at times creating a room for a particular guest. He later opened a section of Casapueblo to tourism as a hotel.

Páez Vilaró remained active in European and African culture, as well. He remained close with numerous friends from his days in Paris in the late 1950s, particularly Brigitte Bardot and Pablo Picasso, and in 1967, established a film production company ("Dahlia") with the help of European industrialists Gerard Leclery and Gunther Sachs. He traveled in numerous West African nations to make a documentary, Batouk, with director Jean-Jacques Manigot and poet Aimé Césaire.

The artist's first marriage, to Madelón Rodríguez Gómez, though brief, produced three children. Páez Vilaró experienced difficulties in other areas of his life. He met Annette Deussen, an Argentine tourist, in 1976, and she had his child in 1984. Deussen was married to another man at the time, and the marriage dissolved in 1986; she and Páez Vilaró married in 1989. Her former spouse, however, continued his legal fight for the child for over a decade, even after Páez Vilaró's paternity was established by tests. The matter was ultimately resolved in the Páez Vilarós' favor in 1999.

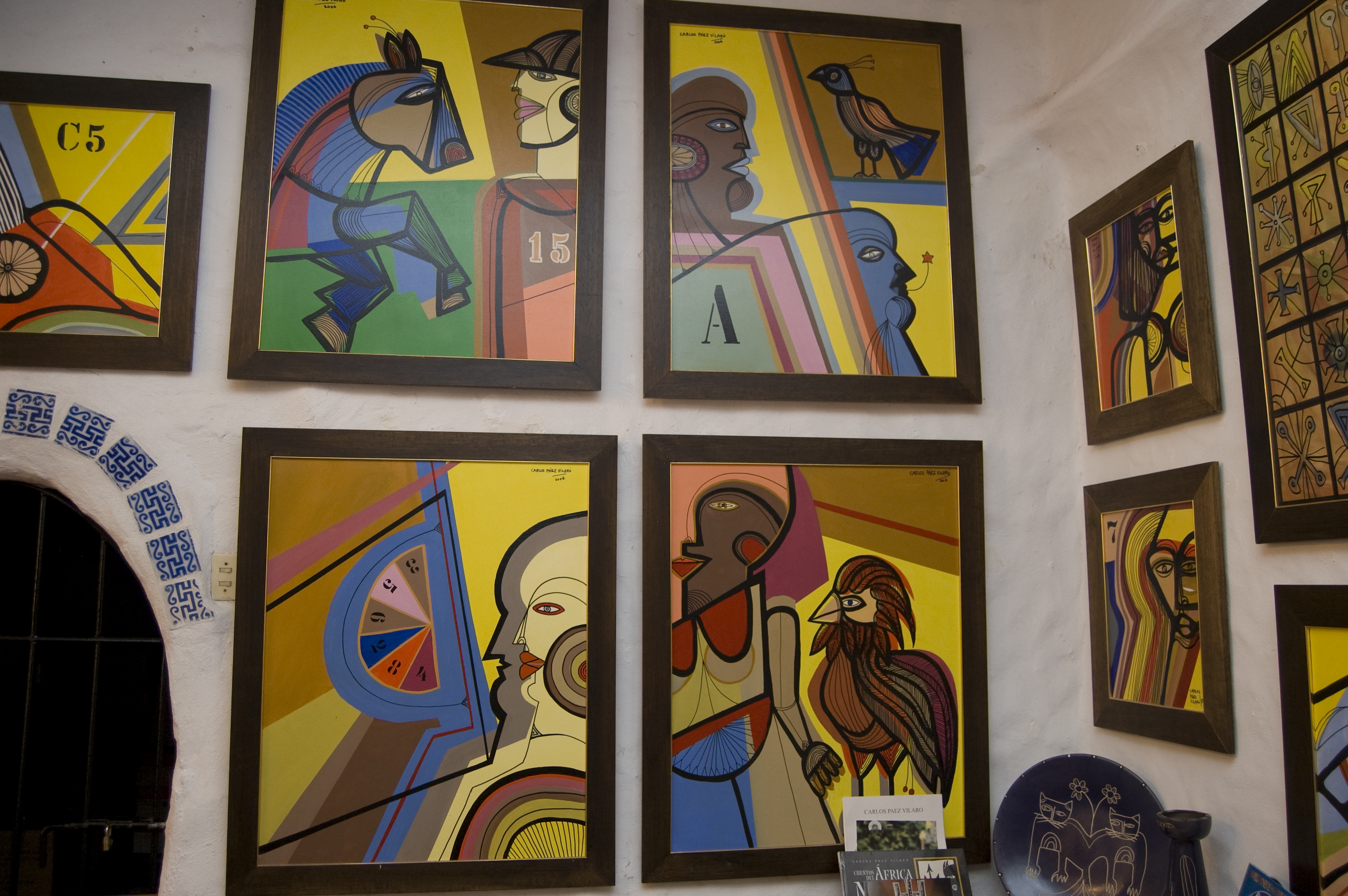
A number of recent paintings by the artist, on display at Casapueblo.

He continued to create murals and sculptures for various government offices, corporate headquarters, private homes, and other buildings. He created 12 murals in Argentina, 16 in Brazil, 4 in Chad, 3 in Chile, 4 in Gabon, 11 in the United States, and 30 in his native Uruguay, as well as a scattering of works elsewhere in Africa and in the Polynesian islands. He also designed a non-denominational chapel for a cemetery without crosses or headstones in San Isidro, Buenos Aires and rebuilt an abandoned house in nearby Tigre in 1989 in the manner of Casapueblo; he considered the San Isidro chapel his "greatest work". In his last years the artist divided his time between Casapueblo and "Bengala," his Tigre residence.

On 24 February 2014, Páez Vilaró died at the age of 90 at his home Casapueblo, in Punta Ballena.

His son stated in reaction to his father's death: "I hope he rests in peace. I've never seen a guy who works that much, and I mean it. He worked up until yesterday."

== Crash of Uruguayan Air Force Flight 571 ==
Carlos "Carlitos" Páez Rodríguez, Vilaro's son from his marriage to Madelón Rodríguez Gómez, was involved in the crash of Uruguayan Air Force Flight 571 on 13 October 1972. The plane was carrying alumni of the Stella Maris College, known as the "Old Christians" Rugby team, and their supporters. It crashed in the Andes range, between Chile and Mendoza Province, Argentina. Páez Vilaró was a leader in the search and rescue mission for the 45 passengers, of which 16 survived, including his son Carlitos, with whom he was reunited shortly after their 23 December rescue.

Carlos Páez Rodríguez portrays Vilaro reading the official list of names of survivors during a radio broadcast in the 2023 film about the crash, Society of the Snow.

== Bibliography ==
- Vilaró, Carlos Páez (2007). The Moon Between My Son and I. Casapueblo Ediciones.
- Read, Piers Paul (1974). Alive: The Story of the Andes Survivors (First ed.). J. B. Lippincott Company. ISBN 039701001X. The 1993 film, Alive, is an adaptation of this book.
- Vierci, Pablo (2024). Society of the Snow: The Definitive Account of the World's Greatest Survival Story. Translated by Erikson, Jennie. Constable. ISBN 978-1408716373. Originally published in Spanish in 2008 as La Sociedad de la Nieve: Por Primera Vez Los 16 Sobrevivientes Cuentan la Historia Completa. The 2023 film, Society of the Snow, is an adaptation of this book.
