= 9 (2021 film) =

- Film poster
- Directed by: Martín Barrenechea; Nicolás Branca
- Written by: Martín Barrenechea; Nicolás Branca
- Produced by: Virginia Hinze; Lucía Gaviglio Salkind
- Starring: Enzo Vogrincic; Rafael Spregelburd; Horacio Camandulle
- Cinematography: Matías Lasarte
- Edited by: Anabela Lattanzio
- Music by: Mariano Barrella
- Production companies: Pensa&Rocca Cine; U Films.
- Distributed by: Meikincine Entertainment
- Release dates: 13 November 2021 (Huelva); 7 July 2022 (Uruguay)
- Running time: 105 minutes
- Countries: Uruguay; Argentina
- Language: Spanish

9 is a 2021 Uruguayan-Argentine sports drama film written and directed by Martín Barrenechea & Nicolás Branca (in their directorial debuts). It stars Enzo Vogrincic, Rafael Spregelburd, Horacio Camandulle, Rogelio Gracia, Roxana Blanco, Lara Sofía, Santiago Sanguinetti. The film won Best International Film at the 8th National Film Awards. It was also considered by Uruguay's Instituto Nacional del Cine and the Audiovisual Uruguayo for the Uruguayan selection for the Best International Feature Film at the 95th Academy Awards, but it was not chosen.

== Synopsis ==
Christian Arias is a successful football player who, at the age of 23, projects himself as a great figure in world soccer. He lives isolated in a luxurious and solitary environment, besieged by fans, pressured by the press and sentenced to fulfill commitments set by his parents, who also act as their representative. Christian feels for the first time the need to escape.

== Cast ==
The actors participating in this film are:

- Rafael Spregelburd as Óscar
- Enzo Vogrincic as Christian
- Horacio Camandulle as Wilmer
- Rogelio Gracia as Damián
- Roxana Blanco as Dr. Gutman
- Lara Sofía as Belén
- Santiago Sanguinetti as Gabriel

== Release ==
The film premiered on 12 November 2021 in the Official Section of the 47th Huelva Ibero-American Film Festival. It had its commercial premiere in Uruguayan movie theaters on 7 July 2022.
