= Enzo Vogrincic =

Uruguayan actor

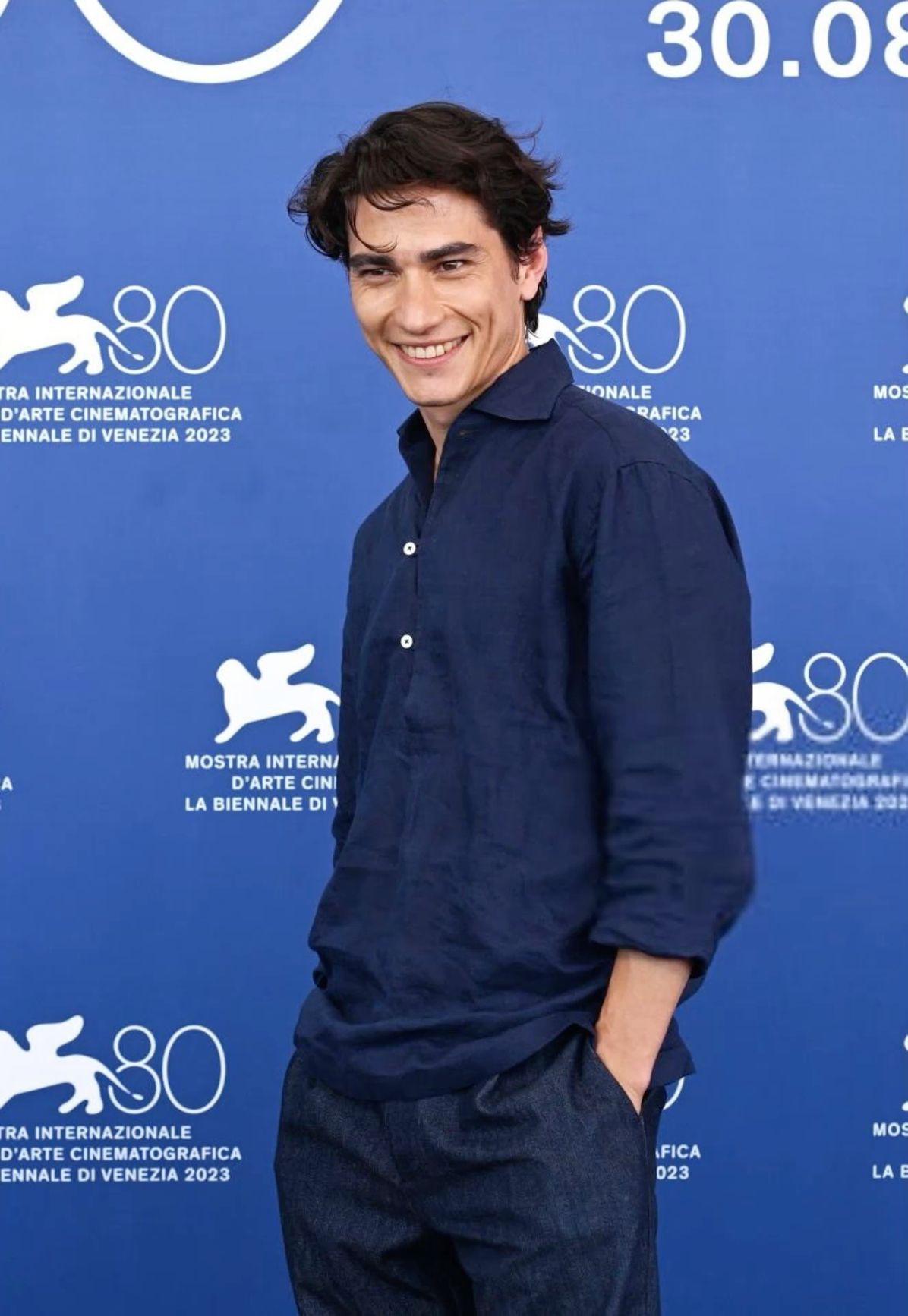
- Vogrincic at the 80th Venice International Film Festival
- Born: Enzo Vogrincic Roldán; 22 March 1993 (age 33); Montevideo, Uruguay
- Education: Multidisciplinary School of Dramatic Art
- Occupation: Actor
- Years active: 2013–present
- Notable work: Society of the Snow
- Height: 173 cm (5 ft 8 in)

Enzo Vogrincic Roldán (Latin American Spanish: [ˈenso βoɣɾinˈsik]; born 22 March 1993) is a Uruguayan actor, best known for playing Numa Turcatti in the 2023 film Society of the Snow.

== Early life ==
Vogrincic was born on 22 March 1993 in the Casavalle neighbourhood of Montevideo to Guillermo Vogrincic, a former professional footballer who played for Montevideo Wanderers, and Silvia Roldán Risotto. Vogrincic is of maternal Spanish and Italian, and paternal Slovene descent; his grandfather's family migrated from Murska Sobota to Montevideo during World War II. Vogrincic has a brother, Ángel.

Vogrincic began acting in his teens while attending the Liceo Jubilar Juan Pablo II, a high school in the city of Montevideo. In 2013, at the age of 20, he enrolled at the Margarita Xirgu Multidisciplinary School of Dramatic Art.

== Career ==
Vogrincic has mainly developed his acting career in the theater, including guest appearances in several Comedia Nacional productions. In 2018 he had a minor participation in the film A Twelve-Year Night and has since acted in independent films. In 2021 he starred in the film 9 playing a professional footballer inspired by Luis Suárez. The film was awarded the Best International Film Award at the 8th British National Film Awards.

In addition, Vogrincic has appeared in the Amazon Prime Video television series Yosi, the Regretful Spy and Porno y helado. In 2024, he gained relevance when he was announced as part of the cast of the survival thriller film Society of the Snow, based on Uruguayan Air Force Flight 571 that crashed in the Andes Mountains in 1972. It was then announced that he would play Numa Turcatti —the last passenger to die— and that he would be the narrator of the film.

In October 2025, he was cast as Hugo Crussi in the Netflix dystopian miniseries The Future Is Ours, an adaptation of the science fiction novel The World Jones Made by Philip K. Dick.

== Filmography ==
=== Film ===
Year	Title	Role	Director(s)
2018	A Twelve-Year Night	Police officer	Álvaro Brechner
2020	Yí (El río que no se corta)	Muchacho	Karin Porley Von Bergen
2021	9	Christian Arias	Martín Barrenechea & Nicolás Branca
2022	Noctilucas	Lucas	Diego Alvarez Parra
2023	Society of the Snow	Numa Turcatti	J. A. Bayona

=== Television ===
Year	Title	Role	Notes
2022	Porno y helado	Franco	Episode: "La Fiesta"
2022	Yosi, the Regretful Spy	Rivera	8 episodes
2027	The Future is Ours	Hugo Crussi	8 episodes

=== Theatre ===
Year	Title	Role	Venue	Ref.
2016	El gato de Schrödinger		Solís Theatre	
2017	El lugar de las luciérnagas		Solís Theatre	
2017	Subterránea	Germán	Espacio Tractatus	
2018	La Ronde		Teatro El Galpón	
2019	Cuando pases sobre mi tumba	The necrophile	Solís Theatre	
2021	Galgos		Teatro Sala Verdi	
2025	Sweet Bird of Youth	Chance Wayne	Solís Theatre	

== Awards and nominations ==
Year	Award	Category	Work	Result	Ref.
2024	7th Astra Film Awards	Best International Actor	Society of the Snow	Nominated	
2024	11th Platino Awards	Best Actor	Society of the Snow	Won	
