= Carlos Páez Rodríguez =

Uruguayan entrepreneur, motivational speaker and writer

- Born: Carlos Miguel Páez Rodríguez; 31 October 1953 (age 72); Montevideo, Uruguay
- Education: Universidad del Trabajo del Uruguay
- Alma mater: Stella Maris College (Montevideo)
- Occupations: Entrepreneur, motivational speaker, writer, rugby player
- Children: 2
- Website: Carlitos Páez

Carlos "Carlitos" Miguel Páez Rodríguez (born October 31, 1953) is a Uruguayan entrepreneur and former rugby player. He is one of the 16 survivors of the Uruguayan Air Force Flight 571, which crashed in the Andes mountains on 13 October 1972. He is the son of the painter Carlos Páez Vilaró.

== Biography ==
He is the son of Uruguayan artist Carlos Páez Vilaró and was a rugby player for the Old Christians Club.

Paez said he was utterly unprepared for the tragedy. “I was an 18-year-old boy, the son of a famous painter who gave us everything. I still had a nanny – she packed my suitcase for the trip. I had never been cold. I had never been hungry. I had never done anything useful. And I lived the most incredible survival story of all time.”

He graduated from University of Labor of Uruguay and worked as an agricultural technician for 10 years. In 1992 he started a career in advertising as a member of Nivel-Publicis creative team. He founded his own agency, Rating Publicidad, and was director of Bates Uruguay Publicidad. In the present day, apart from his activities as a lecturer, he manages his own communication consultancy and public relations firm. He has two children, Maria Elena de los Andes "Gochi" and Carlos Diego; and three granddaughters, Mía, Justina and Violeta. In 2003, Páez published the book After The Tenth Day which became a best seller and has gone through 14 printings.

== Filmography ==
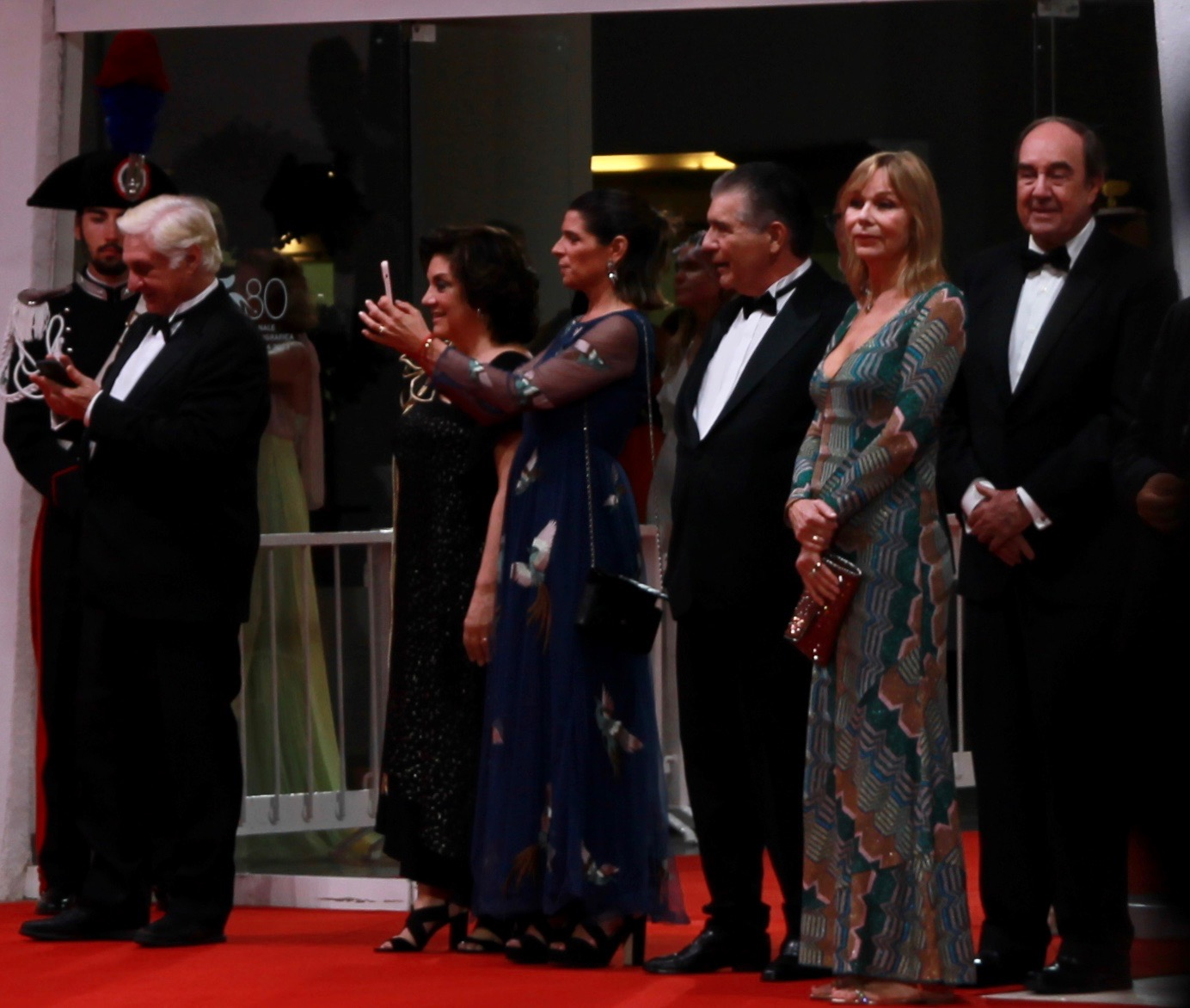
Roberto Canessa, Fernando Parrado, and Carlos Páez Rodríguez attend the Venice premiere of the film "Society of the Snow" in 2023.

Rodríguez was portrayed by Bruce Ramsay and John Malkovich (as the older Carlos, the narrator at the start of the movie, uncredited) in the 1993 feature film Alive, and by Felipe González Otaño in the 2023 feature film, Society of the Snow. He also portrayed his own father, the artist Carlos Páez Vilaró, in Society of the Snow.

Year	Title	Role	Notes
1993	Alive: 20 Years Later	himself	video documentary
2007	Stranded: I've Come from a Plane That Crashed on the Mountains	himself	documentary
2009	Independent Lens' (Stranded: The Andes Plane Crash Survivors)	himself	TV series documentary
2010	I Am Alive: Surviving the Andes Plane Crash	himself	documentary aired on History Channel
2023	Society of the Snow	Carlos Páez Vilaró	feature film
2024	Society of the Snow: Who Were We on the Mountain?	himself	Netflix documentary

== Bibliography ==
- Paez, Carlitos (2019). After the Tenth Day. Independently Published. ISBN 978-1070116525.
- Read, Piers Paul (1974). Alive: The Story of the Andes Survivors (First ed.). J. B. Lippincott Company. ISBN 039701001X. The 1993 film, Alive, is an adaptation of this book.
- Vierci, Pablo (2024). Society of the Snow: The Definitive Account of the World's Greatest Survival Story. Translated by Erikson, Jennie. Constable. ISBN 978-1408716373. Originally published in Spanish in 2008 as La Sociedad de la Nieve: Por Primera Vez Los 16 Sobrevivientes Cuentan la Historia Completa. The 2023 film, Society of the Snow, is an adaptation of this book.
