= Gaspar Páez =

Argentine footballer (born 1986)

Personal information
- Full name: Gaspar Enrique Páez
- Date of birth: 16 August 1986 (age 40)
- Place of birth: La Plata, Argentina
- Height: 1.75 m (5 ft 9 in)
- Position: Midfielder

Youth career
- Gimnasia La Plata

Senior career*
Years	Team	Apps	(Gls)
2007–2009	Gimnasia LP	0	(0)
2007–2008	→ Correcaminos UAT (loan)	32	(5)
2009–2010	Boca Unidos	16	(1)
2010–2013	La Emilia	72	(13)
2011–2012	→ Sportivo Las Parejas (loan)	23	(4)
2013	Defensores de Belgrano	4	(0)
2014	Deportivo La Guaira	18	(2)
2014–2015	Deportes Temuco	26	(2)
2015–2016	Magallanes	25	(4)
2016–2017	Ñublense	22	(2)
Total		238	(33)
- * Club domestic league appearances and goals

Gaspar Enrique Páez (born 16 August 1986) is a former Argentine footballer. His last club was Ñublense.
