= Ron Paez =

Australian rules footballer

Personal information
- Full name: Ronald Norman Paez
- Born: 10 November 1931
- Died: 17 August 2014 (aged 82); Shepparton
- Original team: Albert Park
- Height: 182 cm (6 ft 0 in)
- Weight: 85 kg (187 lb)

Playing career^{1}
Years	Club	Games (Goals)
1949–1953	South Melbourne	52 (51)
- ^{1} Playing statistics correct to the end of 1953.

Ronald Norman Paez (10 November 1931 – 17 August 2014) was an Australian rules football player.

== Playing career ==
Paez made his debut for South Melbourne in Round 9 of the 1949 VFL season. By the end of 1949 he had played seven games. He played a total of 52 matches, scoring 51 goals. His last match was against Fitzroy in 1953. He then moved to Shepparton where he captained and coached the Shepparton Football Club in the Goulburn Valley Football League, including coaching them to the 1957 premiership.
