= Punta Ballena =

Punta Ballena Portezuelo, Solanas
- Resort
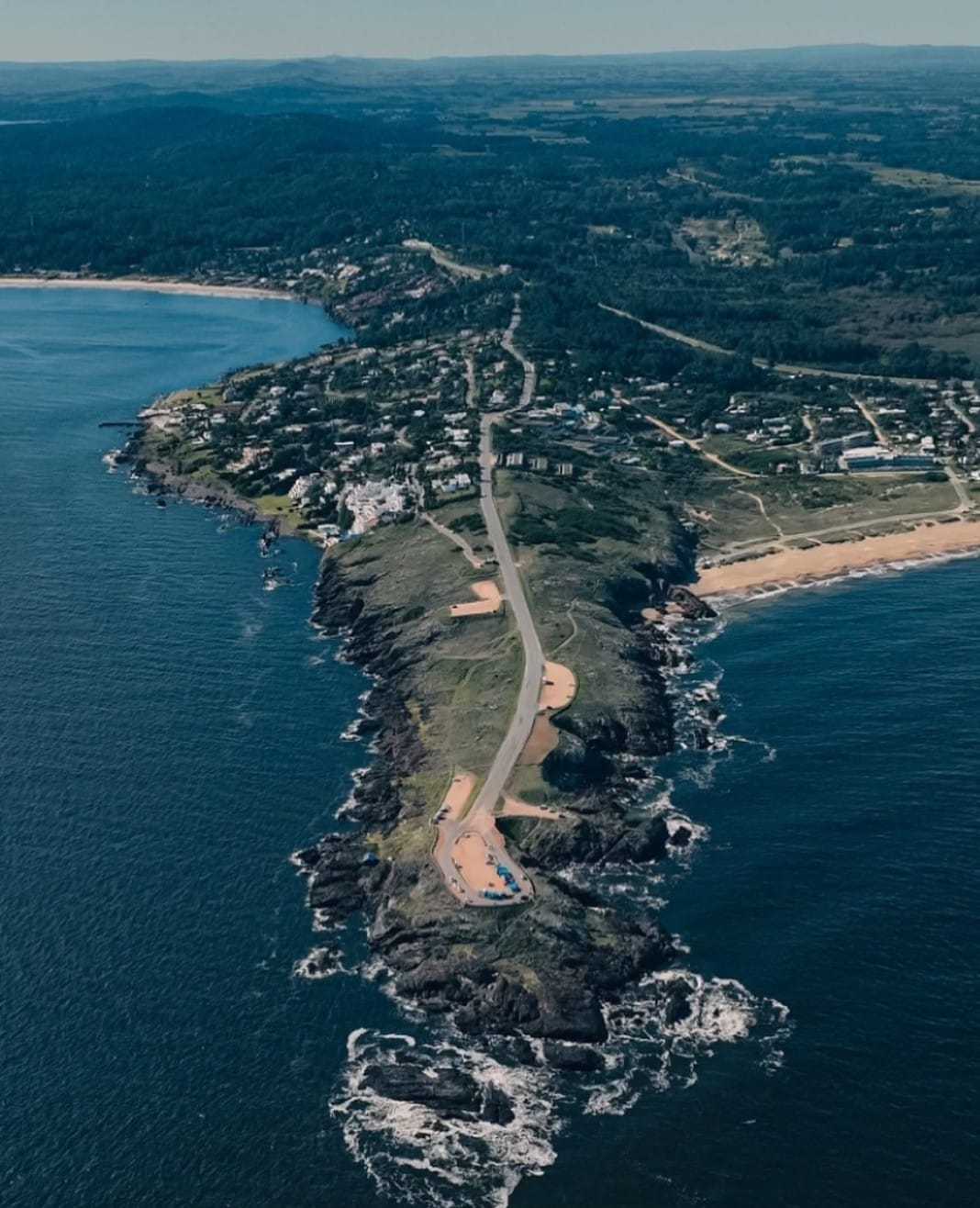
- Punta Ballena

- Location in Uruguay
- Coordinates: 34°53′20″S 55°2′26″W
- Country: Uruguay
- Department: Maldonado Department

Population (2011)
  - Total: 750
- Time zone: UTC -3
- Postal code: 20003
- Dial plan: +598 42 (+6 digits)
- Climate: Cfb

Punta Ballena is a small peninsula (punta) and a resort (balneario), as well as an important tourist attraction on the coast of Río de la Plata in the Maldonado Department of southeastern Uruguay. It comprises an approximately 12 kilometres (7.5 mi) long stripe of beaches and landforms and extends on both sides of Route 10.

== Geography ==
Punta Ballena borders the resort Chihuahua to the west, it includes the Casapueblo citadel, the promontory of Punta Ballena, and the beach Playa Las Grutas to the east of it. Further east it borders the resort Pinares - Las Delicias with the oblong lake, Laguna del Diario, as the natural limit between them. To the northeast it borders the Park and Arboretum Lussich and the small populated centre Las Cumbres directly north of the park, while another small populated center, Los Corchos, lies to the south of the park.

== History ==
Established by Antonio Lussich, who purchased the land and in 1896 founded his namesake arboretum, Punta Ballena and the neighboring resort city of Punta del Este grew to become leading destinations for tourism in Uruguay during the summertime high season (December through February).

== Population ==
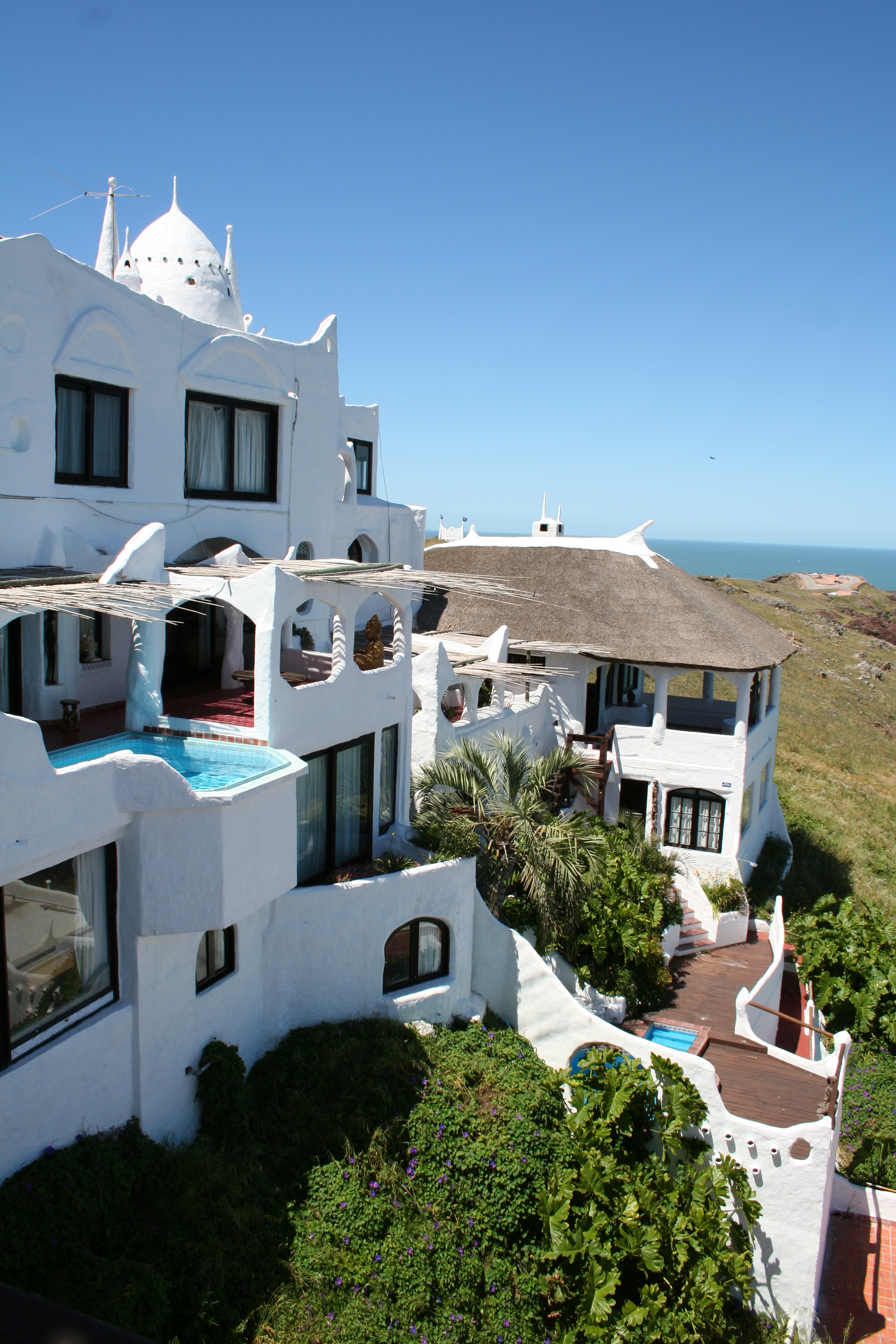
Casapueblo

In 2011 Punta Ballena had a population of 750 permanent inhabitants and 2,375 dwellings.

Year	Population	Dwellings
1963	107	88
1975	169	241
1985	499	687
1996	799	921
2004	376	1,268
2011	750	2,375

Source: Instituto Nacional de Estadística de Uruguay

== Points of interest ==
The town's best-known point of interest is the Casapueblo citadel, sculptor Carlos Páez Vilaró's onetime residence and atelier. Páez Vilaró began his "living sculpture" in 1958, sometimes adding a new room to host a particular friend, and eventually created a lodge within Casapueblo. The surrounding promontories are also popular hang gliding spots.

Punta Ballena was known for whales such as breeding southern right whales hence was named. They are becoming more regular along the coast during wintering seasons and whale watching is a popular attraction. The region is also notable for holding presences of orcas that are seldom in most of Uruguayan areas.

== Other names ==
The resort northwest of the peninsula of Punta Ballena and east of Chihuahua, as well as the beach are also known as Portezuelo and Solanas, a name derived from the Hotel Solana del Mar. The name "Playa Portezuelo", is sometimes given to describe all the long stretch of the beach up to Punta Negra.

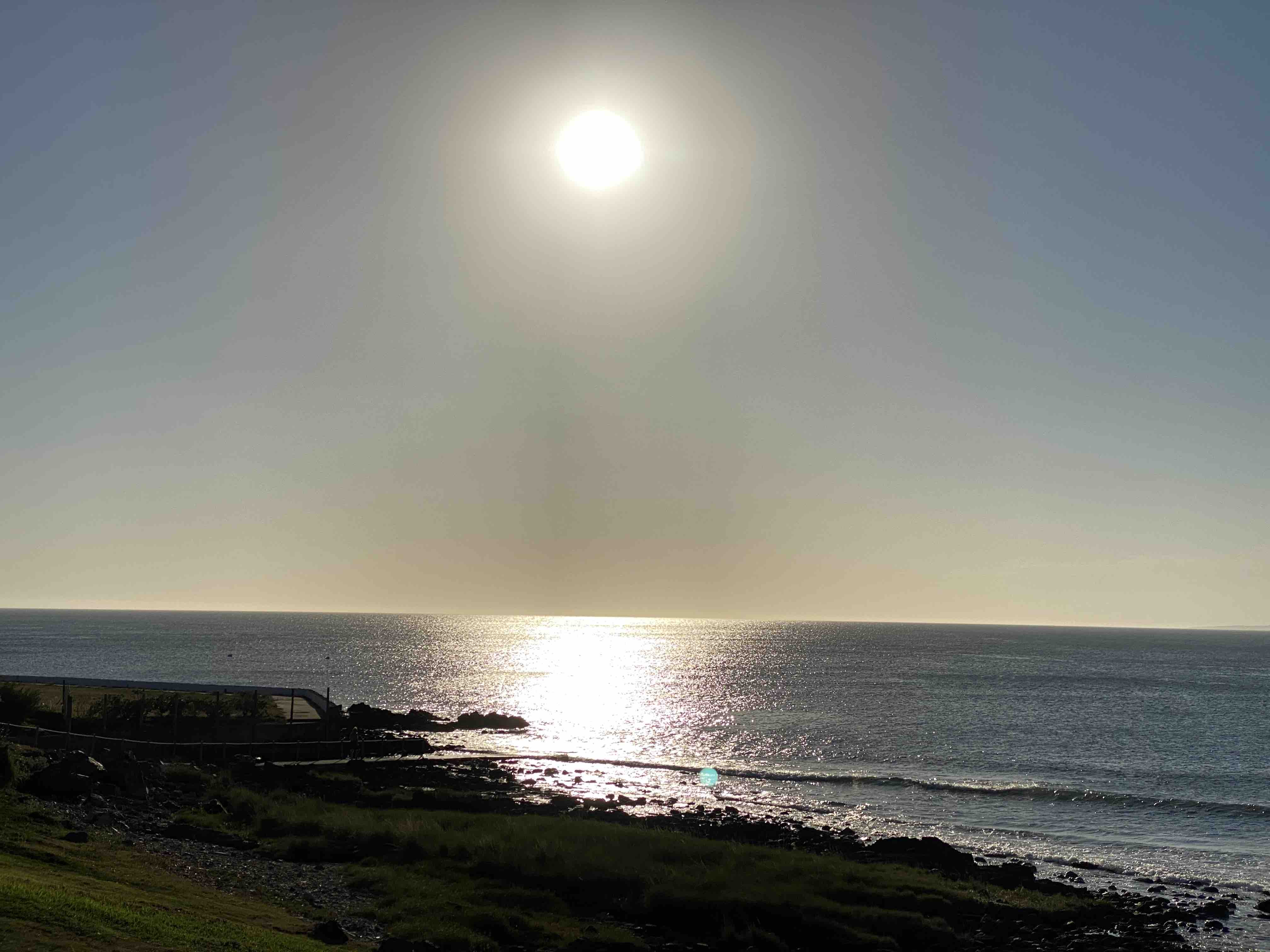
Punta Ballena is also famous for its breathtaking sunset views
