= Roberto François =

Uruguayan rugby player and disaster survivor

- Born: Roberto Fernando Jorge François Álvarez; 23 November 1951 (age 74)
- Spouse: Graciana Manini
- Children: 6

Roberto Fernando Jorge François Álvarez (born 23 November 1951), better known as Bobby François, is a former Uruguayan rugby player and agricultural producer, known for being one of the sixteen survivors of the Uruguayan Air Force Flight 571 crash in the Andes Mountains in 1972.

Like many other survivors, Bobby had studied at the Stella Maris school in the Carrasco neighborhood and was a member of the Old Christians rugby team.

== Tragedy of the Andes ==
At the time of the plane crash, Bobby was 20 years old (and turned 21 at the mountain range). His companions say that he seemed to not have a survival instinct, from the moment of the accident, when he sat down in the snow, lit a cigarette and said: "We've had it!".

On the mountain, Bobby seemed to have no will to live. The others thought he did not care whether he lived or died, such was his degree of apathy and depression. He was not very cooperative. He would melt ice when he was forced to. When his fellow survivors threatened to stop giving him food if he didn't work, he would reply "It seems fair to me". Nevertheless, the group never stopped caring for him, to the point that Daniel Fernández massaged his feet so that they would not get infected.

In Bobby's words: "I never saw a clear way out, what I could see was a series of shades ranging from opaque gray to deep black. In that inner struggle I lived the seventy-two days".

== Personal life ==
As of 2023, he is married to Graciana Manini. He has six children: Roberto, Federico, Sofía, Josefina, Milagros and Diego. He is a technician and agricultural producer and lives between his ranch and Carrasco. Bobby has kept a low profile and has not been seen much in the media.

== In popular media ==
Roberto François was played by actor Jack Noseworthy in the 1993 film Alive and by actor Agustín Berruti in the 2023 film Society of the Snow.

== Bibliography ==
- Read, Piers Paul (1974). Alive: The Story of the Andes Survivors (First ed.). J. B. Lippincott Company. ISBN 039701001X. The 1993 film, Alive, is an adaptation of this book.
- Vierci, Pablo (2024). Society of the Snow: The Definitive Account of the World's Greatest Survival Story. Translated by Erikson, Jennie. Constable. ISBN 978-1408716373. Originally published in Spanish in 2008 as La Sociedad de la Nieve: Por Primera Vez Los 16 Sobrevivientes Cuentan la Historia Completa. The 2023 film, Society of the Snow, is an adaptation of this book.
