= Alive (1993 film) =

1993 film by Frank Marshall

- Theatrical release poster
- Directed by: Frank Marshall
- Screenplay by: John Patrick Shanley
- Based on: Alive: The Story of the Andes Survivors by Piers Paul Read
- Produced by: Kathleen Kennedy; Robert Watts
- Starring: Ethan Hawke; Vincent Spano; Josh Hamilton
- Cinematography: Peter James
- Edited by: Michael Kahn; William Goldenberg
- Music by: James Newton Howard
- Production companies: Touchstone Pictures; Paramount Pictures; The Kennedy/Marshall Company
- Distributed by: Buena Vista Pictures Distribution (United States and Canada); Paramount Pictures (through United International Pictures, International)
- Release date: January 15, 1993
- Running time: 126 minutes
- Country: United States
- Language: English
- Budget: $32 million
- Box office: $82.5 million

Alive is a 1993 American survival drama film directed by Frank Marshall, and based on Piers Paul Read's 1974 book Alive: The Story of the Andes Survivors. It is the second feature film about the Uruguayan rugby team whose plane crashed in the Andes mountains in 1972. Filmed in the Purcell Mountains in British Columbia, the film was written by John Patrick Shanley, narrated by John Malkovich, and stars Ethan Hawke, Josh Hamilton, Vincent Spano, Bruce Ramsay, John Haymes Newton, Illeana Douglas, and Danny Nucci. One of the survivors, Nando Parrado (portrayed by Hawke in the film), served as the technical advisor for the film.

Alive was released on January 15, 1993 by Buena Vista Pictures Distribution through the Touchstone Pictures label in the United States and Canada and by Paramount Pictures through United International Pictures in international markets. The film received mixed to positive reviews from critics and grossed $82.5 million on a $32 million budget.

== Plot ==
A group of photographs of the Stella Maris College's Old Christians Rugby Team are seen as Carlitos Páez points out several members of the team and reflects on the accident in a brief monologue.

Uruguayan Air Force Flight 571 flies over the Andes on October 13, 1972. The raucous rugby players and a few of their relatives and friends are eagerly looking forward to an upcoming match in Chile.

Upon emerging from clouds, the plane encounters turbulence and collides with a mountain. The wings and tail are separated from the fuselage, which slides down a mountain slope before coming to a stop. Six passengers and one flight attendant are ejected from the plane and die. Antonio, the team captain, coordinates efforts to help the injured. Roberto Canessa and Gustavo Zerbino, both medical students, aid the injured. Another six passengers soon die, including both pilots and Nando's mother, Eugenia. Nando, who sustained a head injury, falls into a coma, and his sister Susana has suffered severe internal injuries.

As the sun sets, the survivors make preparations for the night. Canessa discovers that the seat covers can be unzipped and used as blankets. The survivors go inside the fuselage and curl up beside one another to stay warm. Antonio, Roy Harley, and Rafael Cano plug the gaping hole at the end of the fuselage with luggage to keep out the wind. Two passengers die overnight. With nothing to hunt or gather on the mountain, Antonio declares they will use rationing when the survivors find a tin of chocolates and a case of wine. After seeing a plane fly past, they think it dipped its wings, and the survivors celebrate. Expecting to be rescued the next day, everyone except Javier, his wife Liliana, and Antonio finish the remaining chocolates. This causes a quarrel among Antonio and several others.

Nando regains consciousness. After learning of his mother's death, Nando watches over Susana vigilantly. Knowing she will die of her injuries within a few days, he vows to set off on foot and find a way out of the mountains. When Carlitos reminds him that he will need food, Nando jokingly suggests eating the flesh of the deceased pilots to give him the strength to survive the journey to find help. Susana dies from her injuries. The survivors listen to a radio for word of their rescue but are devastated to hear that the search is to be called off after nine days.

After great debate, the starving passengers decide to eat the flesh of their dead relatives and friends. Zerbino, Rafael, and Juan Martino set off to search for the tail of the plane in hopes of finding batteries for the plane's radio to transmit their location. Among pieces of the wreckage, the teammates find additional corpses, but return to the group with news that the tail of the plane is likely a little further away. Later in the week, an avalanche strikes the plane and fills much of the interior with snow. Eight of the survivors, including Antonio and Liliana, are smothered to death by the snow. The remaining 19 survivors are forced to stay inside the plane when they realize there is a blizzard outside.

A second team, made up of Nando, Canessa, and Tintin, sets out and finds the tail of the plane. Unable to bring the batteries to the fuselage, they return to the fuselage to get Roy, who is thought to have experience with electrical equipment. They bring him to the tail of the plane to see if he can fix the radio. When Roy is unsuccessful, the team decides to return to the fuselage.

Federico and Alberto die from their injuries, as does Rafael, leading Nando to convince a reluctant Canessa to search for a way out of the mountains, taking Tintin with them. Two days into the journey, they send Tintin back to the fuselage so they can appropriate his rations and continue on their own. After a 12-day trek, the two escape the mountains and alert the authorities to their companions' location. Two helicopters, one of which has Nando and Canessa on board, appear overhead of the survivors on the mountain, leading the remaining 14 survivors to celebrate their impending rescue.

In the present, Carlitos describes how a group later returned to the site of the crash and buried the corpses under a pile of stones, marked with a cross. The memorial to the 29 deceased and 16 survivors is shown.

== Cast ==
- Ethan Hawke as Nando Parrado
- Josh Hamilton as Roberto Canessa
- Sam Behrens as Javier Methol
- David Kriegel as Gustavo Zerbino
- Bruce Ramsay (elder one: John Malkovich) as Carlitos Páez
- Kevin Breznahan as Roy Harley
- John Haymes Newton as Antonio "Tintin" Vizintin
- Jack Noseworthy as Bobby Francois
- David Cubitt as Adolfo "Fito" Strauch
- Gian DiDonna as Eduardo Strauch
- John Cassini as Daniel Fernández
- Richard Ian Cox as Ramón "Moncho" Sabella
- Nuno Antunes as Álvaro Mangino
- Gordon Currie as José Luis "Coche" Inciarte
- Michael Tayles as Alfredo Delgado
- Steven Shayler as José Pedro Algorta
- Vincent Spano as Antonio Balbi
- Jake Carpenter as Alberto Antuna
- Michael DeLorenzo as Rafael Cano
- Illeana Douglas as Liliana Methol
- Ele Keats as Susana Parrado
- Christian Meoli as Federico Aranda
- Danny Nucci as Hugo Díaz (survives in the film, even though his real life counterpart, Diego Storm, died in the avalanche)
- José Zúñiga as the Mechanic (Sgt. Carlos "Fraga" Roque)
- Michael Sicoly as the Pilot (Col. Julio César Ferradas)
- Jerry Wasserman as the Co-Pilot (Lt. Colonel Dante Lagurara)
- Tony Morelli as the Navigator (Lt. Ramón Martínez)
- Frank Pellegrino as the Steward (Sgt. Ovidio Joaquín Ramírez)
- Jan D'Arcy as Eugenia Parrado
- Josh Lucas as Felipe Restano
- Chad Willett as Pablo Montero
- Michael Woolson as Juan Martino
- Diana Barrington as Mrs. Alfonsín
- Silvio Pollio as Álex Morales
- Jason Gaffney as Victor Bolarich
- Seth James Arnett as Tomás Alonso
- Aurelio Dinunzio as Dr. Solana
- Fiona Roeske as Mrs. Solana

== Reception ==
On the review aggregator website Rotten Tomatoes, 63% of 30 critics' reviews are positive, with an average rating of 6.3/10. Metacritic, which uses a weighted average, assigned the film a score of 56 out of 100, based on 27 critics, indicating "mixed or average" reviews.

David Ansen of Newsweek said that, while, "Piers Paul Read's acclaimed book ... paid special attention to the social structure that evolved among the group ... Marshall ... downplays the fascinating sociological details—and the ambiguities of character—in favor of action, heroism and a vague religiosity that's sprinkled over the story like powdered sugar."

Others, such as Ray Green, praised the tactful nature of the film stating that, "despite the potential for lurid sensationalism, Marshall manages to keep his and the film's dignity by steering an effectively downbeat course through some grim goings on thanks in no small manner to the almost allegorical ring of Shanley's stylized dialogue." Green continues by describing the film as, "thrilling and engrossing as it is at times, Alive is more than an action film—in its own way it is also a drama of ideas, and of the human spirit as well."

Roger Ebert gave the film a mixed two-and-a-half stars out of a possible four. He praised the "first-rate cast" and cinematography. Yet he wrote: "There are some stories you simply can't tell. The story of the Andes survivors may be one of them [due to the] sheer enormity of the experience." He also questioned the realism of how normal the actors' bodies looked after portraying two months of near-starvation.

The film grossed $36.7 million in the United States and Canada and $45.8 million internationally for a worldwide total of $82.5 million.

=== J. A. Bayona and Society of the Snow ===
Marshall and J. A. Bayona had previously worked together on the 2018 film Jurassic World: Fallen Kingdom. Bayona, director of the 2023 film Society of the Snow which also depicted the Uruguayan Air Force Flight 571 crash and its aftermath, received an email from Marshall telling him "how much he loved" Society of the Snow. Bayona went on to say that Alive "created an impact on a whole generation and, somehow, that film also is the product of its time, you know. That was shot in a studio, in a Hollywood studio. Shot in English. Maybe [it] was too soon, especially for the families of the deceased, to be part of a movie... But it was a very effective film at the time. I think that both films complement each other somehow."

== Documentary ==
- Alive: 20 Years Later is a documentary that was released at the same time as the film. The documentary first aired on CBS on January 30, 1993.
- Beyond Society (Más allá de la sociedad) is an upcoming 2026 documentary series, that will be released on Netflix December 18, 2026. It will include interviews with the authors Piers Paul Read and Pablo Vierci and the filmmakers Frank Marshall and J. A. Bayona.

== See also ==
- Survive! (film) (1976)
- Society of the Snow (2023)
- Cannibalism in popular culture
- List of American films of 1993
