= Francisco Páez (singer) =

Guatemalan singer and songwriter

Francisco Páez is a Guatemalan singer and songwriter. He is the vocalist for the rock/pop Latino band Malacates Trébol Shop.

Páez began playing the guitar as a youth. He attended college and eventually became an architect. Páez currently lives in Guatemala City, where he continues his musical career.
