= University of Labor of Uruguay =

Coordinates: 34.9117°S 56.1786°W

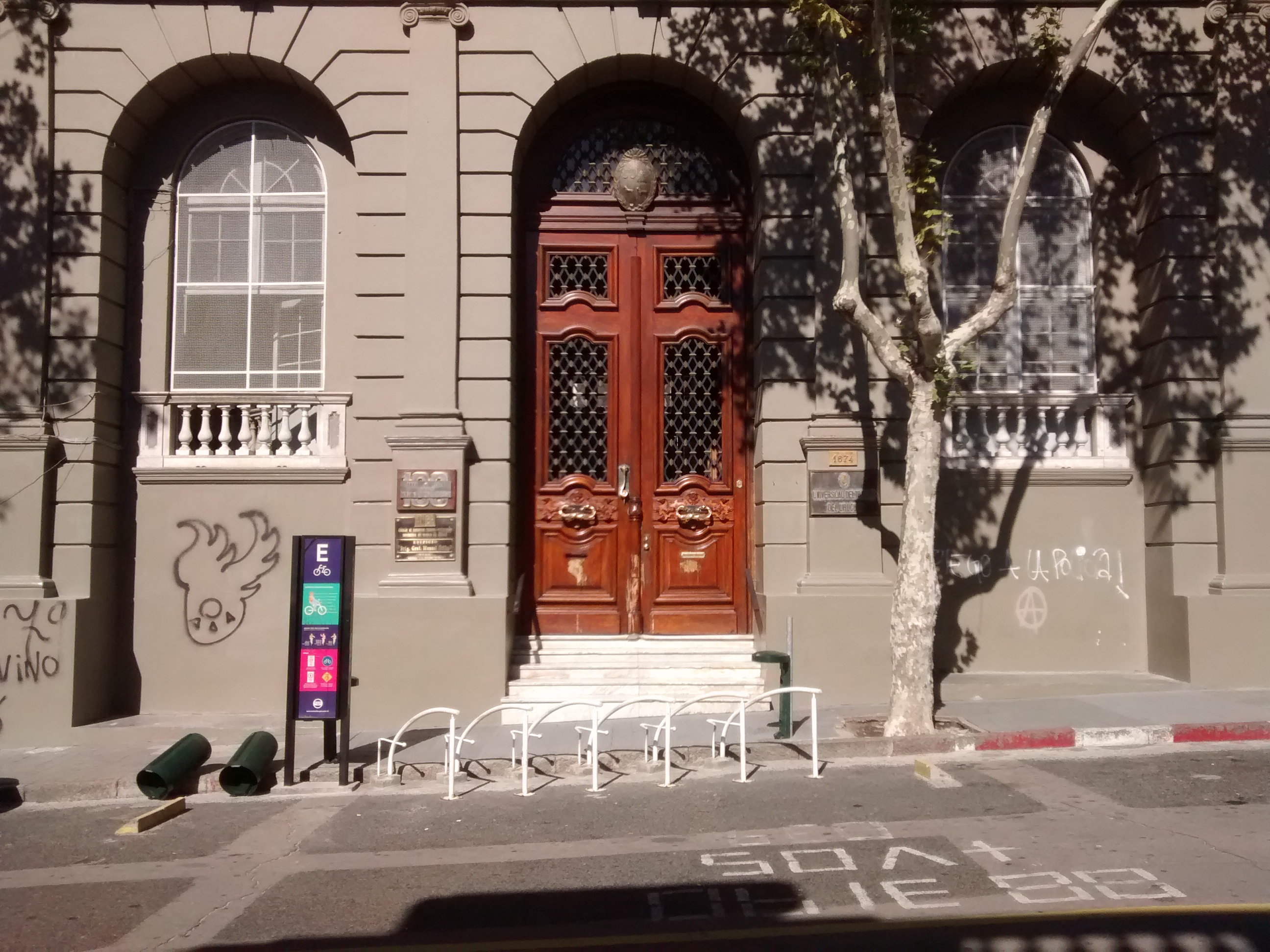
- Type: Public technical university and secondary school
- Established: December 31, 1878
- Director: Agronomical Engineer Juan Pereyra
- Location: Uruguay
- Campus: Multiple sites
- Website: www.utu.edu.uy

The University of Labor of Uruguay (Spanish: Universidad del Trabajo del Uruguay, sometimes UTU), is a public technical and scientific education institution in Uruguay. It was founded in 1878 in Montevideo.

It is one of the most attended institutions in Uruguay, numbering 93,000 students in 2015. It is a sub-organism of the National Public Education Administration through the Professional Technical Education Department.

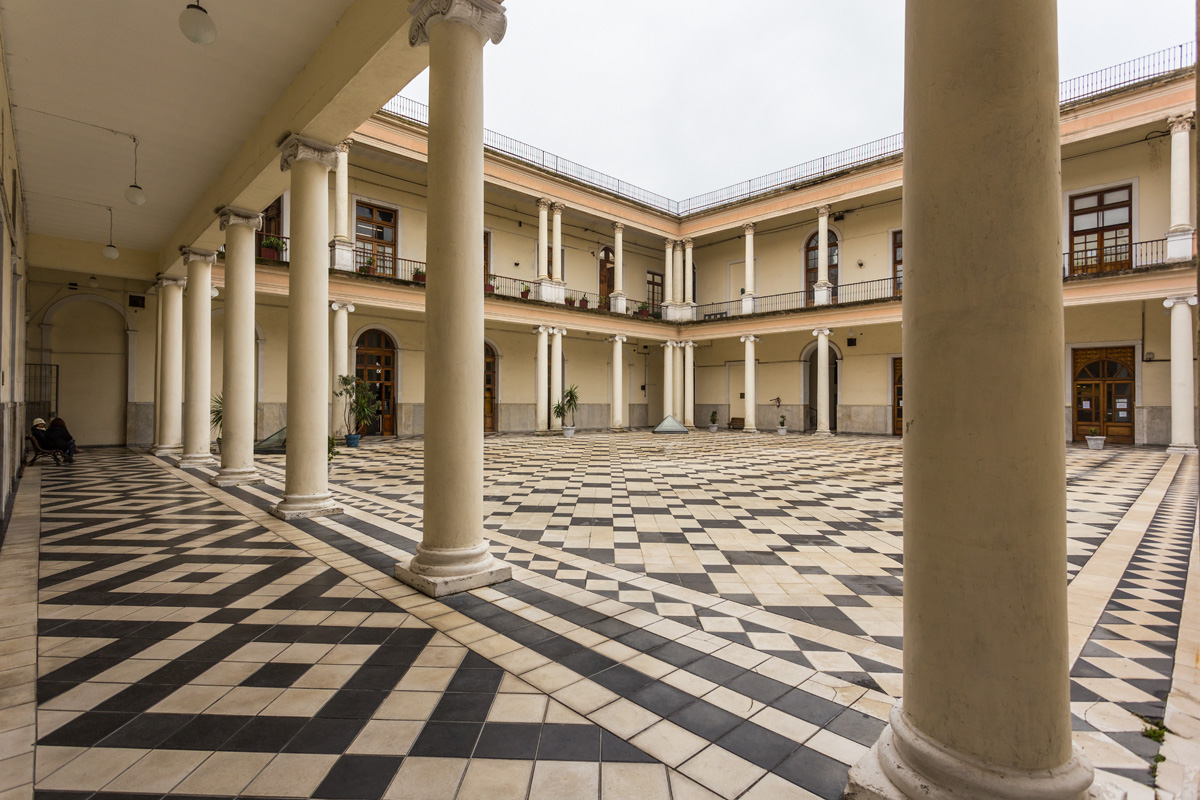
Yard of the main building of the Work University of Uruguay

== History ==
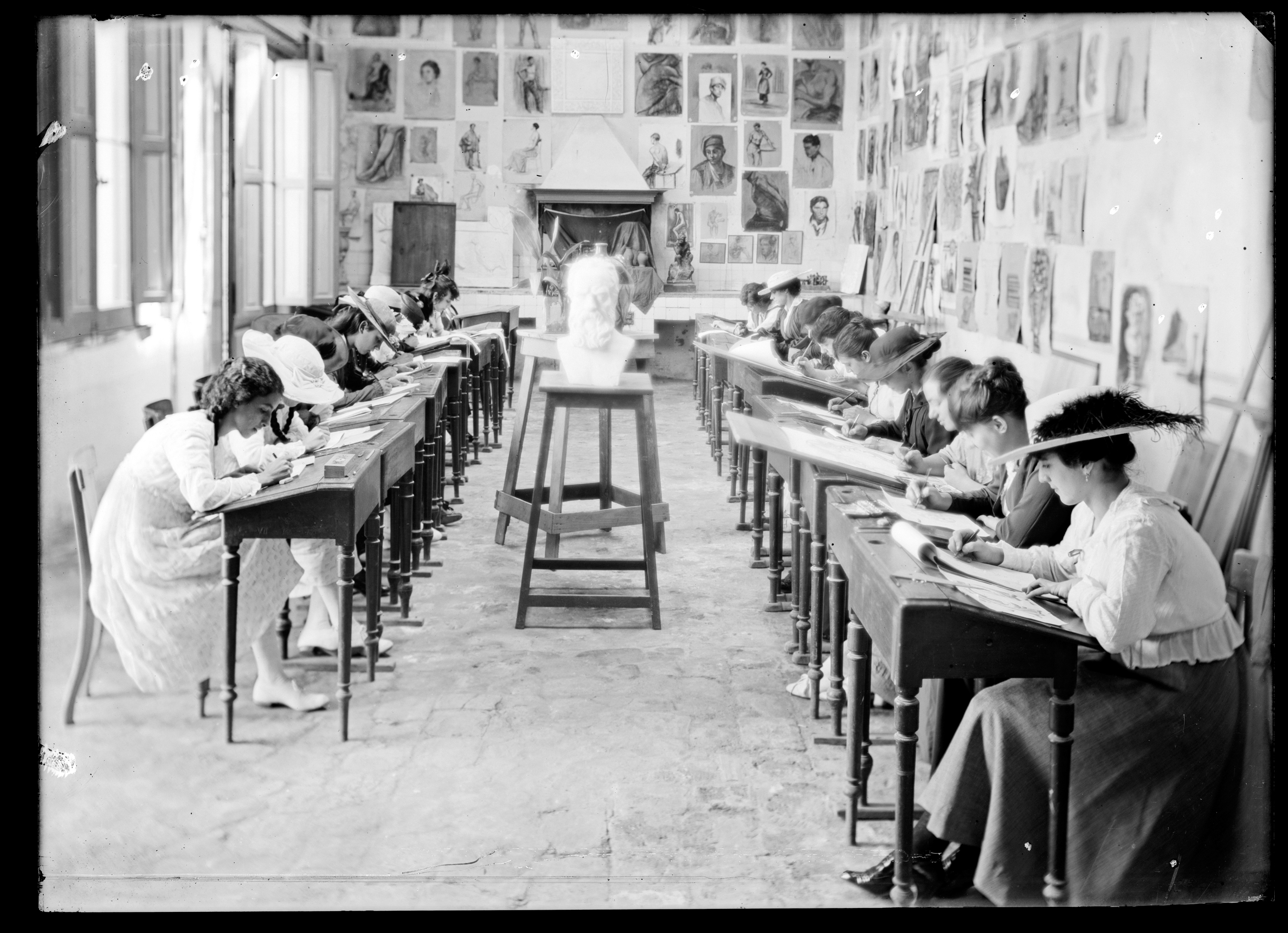
National Arts and Trades School circa 1917.

On 31 December 1878 during Lorenzo Latorre's presidency, the Arts and Trades School was founded in a military installation. It began life as a dependency of the War Ministry, and its students were often criminal youth arrested by the police or the army. During their stay, they were taught to read as well as some trade. In 1887, it was split from the War Ministry and transitioned to a dependency of the Justice, Culture and Public Instruction Ministry. That same year it was renamed to the National Arts and Trades School.

In 1889, the institution represented Uruguay in the Paris International Exposition, during the inauguration of the Eiffel Tower, and that same year it began to be administrated by the National Charity and Public Beneficence Commission.

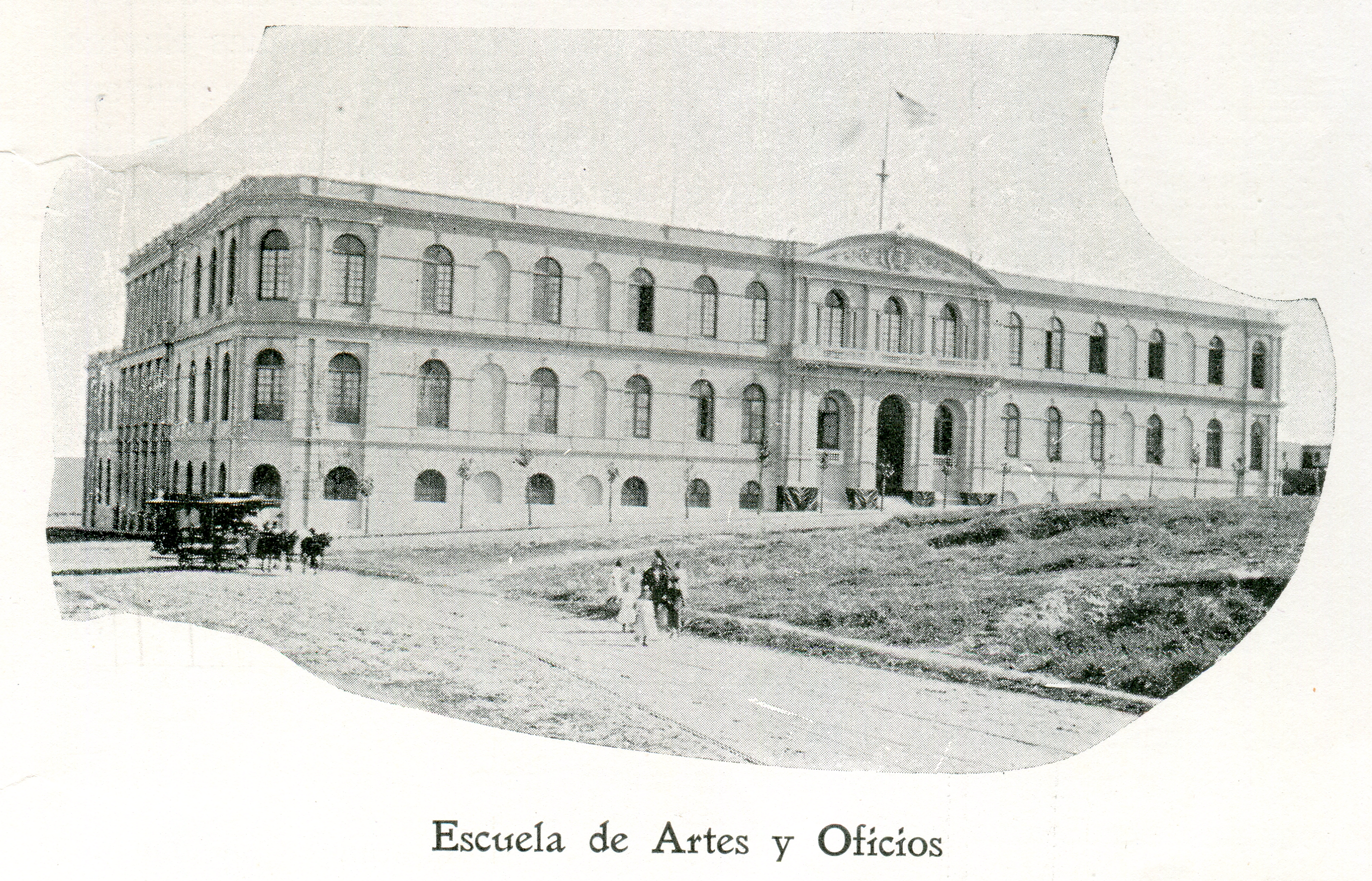
Arts and Trades School, today Work University of Uruguay

It moved to its current location in 1890, in the San Salvador street of the Palermo neighborhood in Montevideo.

In 1908 the National Charity and Public Beneficence commission stopped its administration, and was then a dependency of the Industry, Work and Public Instruction Ministry which created a Directive Council for its direction. Two years after said Council's creation, Pedro Figari entered the school's Directive Council.

The Directive Council became the General Direction of Industrial Education in July 1916, with its first director being Pedro Figari, who introduced changes not only in its governance, but also suppressed the Boarding school system and transformed it into a Mixed-sex education institute, teaching classes for women. This is also when a decentralization began with expansion to outer zones of the capital, as well as cities in the rest of the country.

On May 8, 1922, the Mechanic and Electro-technic school was inaugurated.

=== University of Labor of Uruguay ===
On September 9 of 1942, after the approval of Law 10.225 the National School of Arts and Trades was superseded by the recently founded University of Labor of Uruguay, which would occupy the same building and inherit the active students.

In 1962 it incorporated Tertiary education cycles for electronic, electrotechnic and mechanical courses.

In 1985, due to the approval of the Education Law, the Work University began to be administrated by the Professional Technical Education Council of the National Public Education Administration.

In 1986 the Technological Engineer career was founded.

== Present ==
The University of Labor of Uruguay offers multiple teaching levels: Basic Cycle (middle school), Medium Professional Education, Medium Technological Education, Tertiary Level Technicature (in collaboration with the University of the Republic (Uruguay)), Technological Engineering, Diplomates and short trade courses.

Some courses require complete Secondary education, be it through regular secondary school or a UTU secondary course.

Its official nomenclature is now General Direction of Technical-Professional Education but it maintains its original acronym UTU. It currently offers over 600 courses grouped into eight pedagogical areas:

- Architecture and Construction
- Informatics
- Industry
- Administration and Commerce
- Arts and Humanities
- Services
- Journalism and Communications
- Agronomy
