= List of World Heritage Sites in Argentina =

Location of World Heritage Sites in Argentina. Orange dots represent cultural sites, green are natural, and blue are the Qhapaq Ñan cultural sites.

The United Nations Educational, Scientific and Cultural Organization (UNESCO) World Heritage Sites are places of importance to cultural or natural heritage as described in the UNESCO World Heritage Convention, established in 1972. Cultural heritage consists of monuments (such as architectural works, monumental sculptures, or inscriptions), groups of buildings, and sites (including archaeological sites). Natural heritage consists of natural features (physical and biological formations), geological and physiographical formations (including habitats of threatened species of animals and plants), and natural sites which are important from the point of view of science, conservation, or natural beauty. Argentina accepted the UNESCO World Heritage Convention on 23 August 1978, making its historical sites eligible for inclusion on the list.

There are 12 World Heritage Sites in Argentina, and a further eight on the tentative list. The first site listed was the Los Glaciares National Park, at the 5th session of the World Heritage Committee, held in Sydney, Australia, in October 1981. The most recent site listed was the ESMA Museum, in 2023. Five sites in Argentina are listed for their natural and six for cultural properties. Three sites are shared with other countries: the Jesuit missions are shared with Brazil, the sites of the Inca road system are shared with five countries, and the works of Le Corbusier with six countries.

== World Heritage Sites ==
UNESCO lists sites under ten criteria; each entry must meet at least one of the criteria. Criteria i through vi are cultural, and vii through x are natural.

* Transnational site

World Heritage Sites
Site	Image	Location (province)	Year listed	UNESCO data	Description
Los Glaciares National Park	Perito Moreno Glacier entering the lake	Santa Cruz	1981	145; vii, viii (natural)	The landforms of the national park demonstrate how continuous advancing and retreating of glaciation in the Quaternary is shaping the landscape. The largest ice cap in South America contains numerous large glaciers that feed into glacial lakes. The best known glacier is the Perito Moreno (pictured) that calves icebergs into the Argentino Lake.
Jesuit Missions of the Guaranis: San Ignacio Mini, Santa Ana, Nuestra Señora de Loreto and Santa Maria Mayor (Argentina), Ruins of Sao Miguel das Missoes (Brazil)*	San Ignacio Miní ruins	Misiones	1984	275bis; iv (cultural)	In the 17th and 18th centuries, the Jesuits constructed several missions to the Guaraní people. The remains of five missions are listed as this World Heritage Site. The mission in Brazil was listed alone in 1983 and the four in Argentina were added in 1984. The missions have different layouts and are in different states of conservation. They typically include the remains of churches and convents, plantations, and foundations of indigenous dwellings. San Ignacio Miní is pictured.
Iguazú National Park	Iguazu Falls	Misiones	1984	303; vii, x (natural)	The national park is centered around the imposing Iguazu Falls (pictured), spanning over 2,700 m (8,900 ft) and with a vertical drop of 80 m (260 ft). They were created by the Iguazu River falling over basalt cascades that mark the border between Argentina and Brazil. The surrounding area comprises the Paranese subtropical rainforest, a part of the Atlantic Forest. The forest is rich in biodiversity, with over 2,000 species of vascular plants and large animals such as tapir, giant anteater, howler monkey, ocelot, jaguar, and caiman. On the Brazilian side, the Iguaçu National Park was listed as a separate World Heritage Site in 1986.
Cueva de las Manos, Río Pinturas	Hands painted on a wall	Santa Cruz	1999	936; iii (cultural)	The Cueva de las Manos, literally "the cave of hands", in Río Pinturas contains an exceptional assemblage of prehistoric cave art created by hunter-gatherer communities. In addition to the numerous stencils of human hands, there are depictions of people, plants, hunting scenes, and animals, in particular guanacos that are still present in the region. The oldest art in the cave dates to the 8th millennium BCE, while the youngest traces of inhabitants at the site were dated to around 700 CE.
Península Valdés	A group of South American sea lions on the beach	Chubut	1999	937; x (natural)	The peninsula, stretching off Patagonia into the Atlantic Ocean, is characterized by rocky cliffs, lagoons, shallow bays, dunes, mudflats, small islands, and wetlands, some of which are protected by the Ramsar Convention. The area is important for conservation of marine mammals. It is a breeding ground for the southern right whale and the conservation efforts have helped the recovery of this once widely hunted species. There are also colonies of southern elephant seals and South American sea lions (pictured).
Ischigualasto / Talampaya Natural Parks	Badlands landscape in Ischigualasto	San Juan, La Rioja	2000	966; viii (natural)	The two parks contain six geological formations that cover the entire Triassic period (245 to 208 million years ago). The fossil record documents the complete sequence of animal and plant life over about 50 million years. The findings include the early dinosaurs such as the Eoraptor, reptiles, amphibians, ancestors of mammals, and fish. At least 100 plant species have been identified as well. This offers a unique insight into the life of the Triassic.
Jesuit Block and Estancias of Córdoba	A church at the Alta Gracia Estancia	Córdoba	2000	995; ii, iv (cultural)	For about 150 years in the 17th and 18th centuries, the Jesuits ran a series of settlements with a focus on missionary and educational work. The Jesuit Block in the city of Córdoba, the former capital of the Jesuit province, contains the church, the residential buildings, and the buildings of the National University of Córdoba. The five estancias (ranches) in the region each contained a church, residential buildings, work areas, waterworks, farmhouses, and land for cattle. They illustrate the fusion of European Baroque and Mannerist styles with the cultures of indigenous people and African slave labourers. Alta Gracia is pictured.
Quebrada de Humahuaca	Arid landscape with cacti	Jujuy	2003	1116; ii, iv, v (cultural)	Quebrada de Humahuaca is a gorge created by the Rio Grande river. It starts on the cold desert plateau in the High Andes and ends about 150 km (93 mi) to the south, in the plains. Over the past 10 millennia, the valley has been used as a trade route by different peoples, as the most important connection between the mountains and the plains. Material remains have demonstrated the use of the valley by hunter-gatherer communities and early farmers, pre-Incan towns and villages, the Inca Empire (15th to 16th centuries), and Spanish and republican settlements.
Qhapaq Ñan, Andean Road System*	Paved path in the mountains	several sites	2014	1459; ii, iii, iv, vi (cultural)	Qhapaq Ñan is an extensive pre-Incan and Incan road system, spanning over 30,000 km (19,000 mi) across the Andes. The roads connect high mountain peaks with rainforests, coasts, valleys, and deserts. The road system formed the lifeline of the Inca Empire, allowing transport and exchange of goods, as well as movement of messengers, travelers, and even armies. The site comprises 273 components featuring structures such as roads, bridges, ditches, and supporting infrastructure. The site is shared with Bolivia, Chile, Colombia, Ecuador, and Peru.
The Architectural Work of Le Corbusier, an Outstanding Contribution to the Modern Movement*	Curutchet House, a modernist building in several stories	Buenos Aires	2016	1321rev; i, ii, vi (cultural)	This transnational site (shared with Belgium, France, Germany, Switzerland, India, and Japan) encompasses 17 works of Franco-Swiss architect Le Corbusier. Le Corbusier was an important representative of the Modernist movement, which introduced new architectural techniques to meet the needs of the changing society. The Curutchet House (pictured) is listed in Argentina.
Los Alerces National Park	Mountain lake surrounded by trees	Chubut	2017	1526; vii, x (natural)	The national park protects largely undisturbed sections of continuous Patagonian Forest. This is one of the five temperate forest types in the world and is influenced by the Valdivian temperate forests. The park got its name after the Alerce tree, a conifer endemic to South America, that can achieve great age. The park is also known for its natural beauty, in particular around the Lake Menéndez.
ESMA Museum and Site of Memory – Former Clandestine Center of Detention, Torture and Extermination	White building with the inscription Navy school of mechanics in Spanish	City of Buenos Aires	2023	1681; vi (cultural)	During the military dictatorship between 1976 and 1983, the building of the Navy School of Mechanics (ESMA) served as a clandestine centre of detention, torture, and extermination. More than 5000 men and women were imprisoned, tortured, and killed by the Navy. Pregnant women were kept alive until they gave birth and the babies were stolen. In 2015, the building reopened as a museum. The quest to find the stolen babies contributed to the development of genetic testing to identify grandparents.

== Tentative list ==
In addition to sites inscribed on the World Heritage List, member states can maintain a list of tentative sites that they may consider for nomination. Nominations for the World Heritage List are only accepted if the site was previously listed on the tentative list. Argentina has eight properties on its tentative list.

Tentative sites
Site	Image	Location (province)	Year listed	UNESCO criteria	Description
Valle Calchaquí	Barren mountains and plants in the valley	Catamarca, Salta, Tucumán	2001	ii, iii, iv, v, vi (cultural)	The valley has been inhabited for 12,000 years, first by hunter-gatherers and then by communities that engaged in agriculture and metallurgy. Between the 7th and 9th centuries it was influenced by the Tiwanaku culture from Peru and by the mid-15th century by the Inca Empire. From the 16th century on, the Spanish colonists suppressed the indigenous traditions and imposed new culture and agricultural practices. The area is also important from the geological perspective, with rocks bearing fossils from the Cretaceous period.
Sierra de las Quijadas National Park	View of the desertic sierras	San Luis	2005	vii, viii, ix (natural)	The geological formations in the park date to the Jurassic and Cretaceous periods. The Largarcito Formation represents a palaeoenvironment of a 100 million year old freshwater lake. Numerous fossils have been discovered on site, including the remains of pterosaurs, footprints of what were likely dinosaurs or crocodiles, and imprints of some of the earliest flowering plants. Today, the area is at the junction of the Chaco and Monte biogeographical provinces, with thick profuse forests meeting low and sparse xerophilous forests.
La Payunia, Campos Volcánicos Llancanelo y Payún Matrú	A volcanic cone in a barren landscape	Mendoza	2011	vii, viii (natural)	This nomination comprises volcanic fields that are geologically extremely young, with the last eruptions taking place less than 10,000 years ago. Therefore, the formations created by the volcanism show only little erosion. There are more than hundred basalt cones, as well as lava flows and two major volcanic cones, Payún Matrú (pictured) and Payún Liso. The endorheic basin of the Llancanelo Lagoon is an important habitat for water birds and is protected as a Ramsar site.
Geological, Paleontological and Archaeological Provincial Reserve Pehuén Co–Monte Hermoso	Rocky coast	Buenos Aires	2014	iii, v, vi, viii, ix (mixed)	Thousands of preserved footprints found at the site provide insight into the lives of hunter-gatherer societies in the coastal environment. Fossils found in the region belong to the species that inhabited the area before and after the Great American Interchange. Ground sloths are particularly well represented. When Charles Darwin visited the site in 1832, he found fossils of extinct mammals; this influenced his work on the theory of evolution.
Moisés Ville	School of Moisés Ville with Spanish and Hebrew inscription	Santa Fe	2015	ii, iii, vi (cultural)	Moisés Ville is one of the towns that were founded in the late 19th and early 20th centuries by Russian Jews escaping pogroms and persecution. The layout of the town is a fusion of a shtetl, an Eastern European Jewish settlement, and the grid-like style typical of Latin America. As many shtetls in Europe were destroyed during the wars, Moisés Ville is a representative example of this type of community.
City of Tigre and its rowing clubs	A large building at the river, rowers in boats in front	Buenos Aires	2017	ii, iii (cultural)	The area around the city of Tigre has numerous rivers and streams, including the Tigre, Luján and Reconquista rivers. This made it attractive for water sports, especially rowing. In the late 19th and early 20th centuries, British, French, Belgium, German, Swiss, Scandinavian, Italian, Spanish, and Jewish communities, mainly recent immigrants to Argentina, founded their rowing clubs and erected buildings in an eclectic mixture of styles to support tourism. The building of La Marina Rowing Club is pictured.
Cueva de las Manos and associated sites of the Pinturas River basin	A river flowing through a canyon	Santa Cruz	2018	iii (cultural)	This is a proposed extension to the Cueva de las Manos, which was listed as a World Heritage site in 1999. Several sites in the Pinturas River valley (literally "river of paintings", pictured) are associated with hunter-gatherer communities of the region, with the oldest being around 12,000 years old. They include rock shelters, burial sites, and cliffs with rock art, such as hand prints, depictions of animals, and hunting scenes.
Workers’ Assembly Halls (Argentina)*	Top of a building with large letters CGT	Buenos Aires	2023	iii, iv, vi (cultural)	This transnational nomination comprises buildings in Australia, Argentina, and Denmark related to the international democratic labour movement and mass organisation of workers from 1850 onward. They were purpose-built to serve as meeting places and contained several meeting rooms for assemblies, political, and communal events, offices, often kitchens, printing presses, and businesses. The Edificio de la Confederación General del Trabajo in Buenos Aires, the headquarters of the General Confederation of Labour, constructed in 1950, is nominated in Argentina.
