= Payún Matrú =

Volcano in Argentina

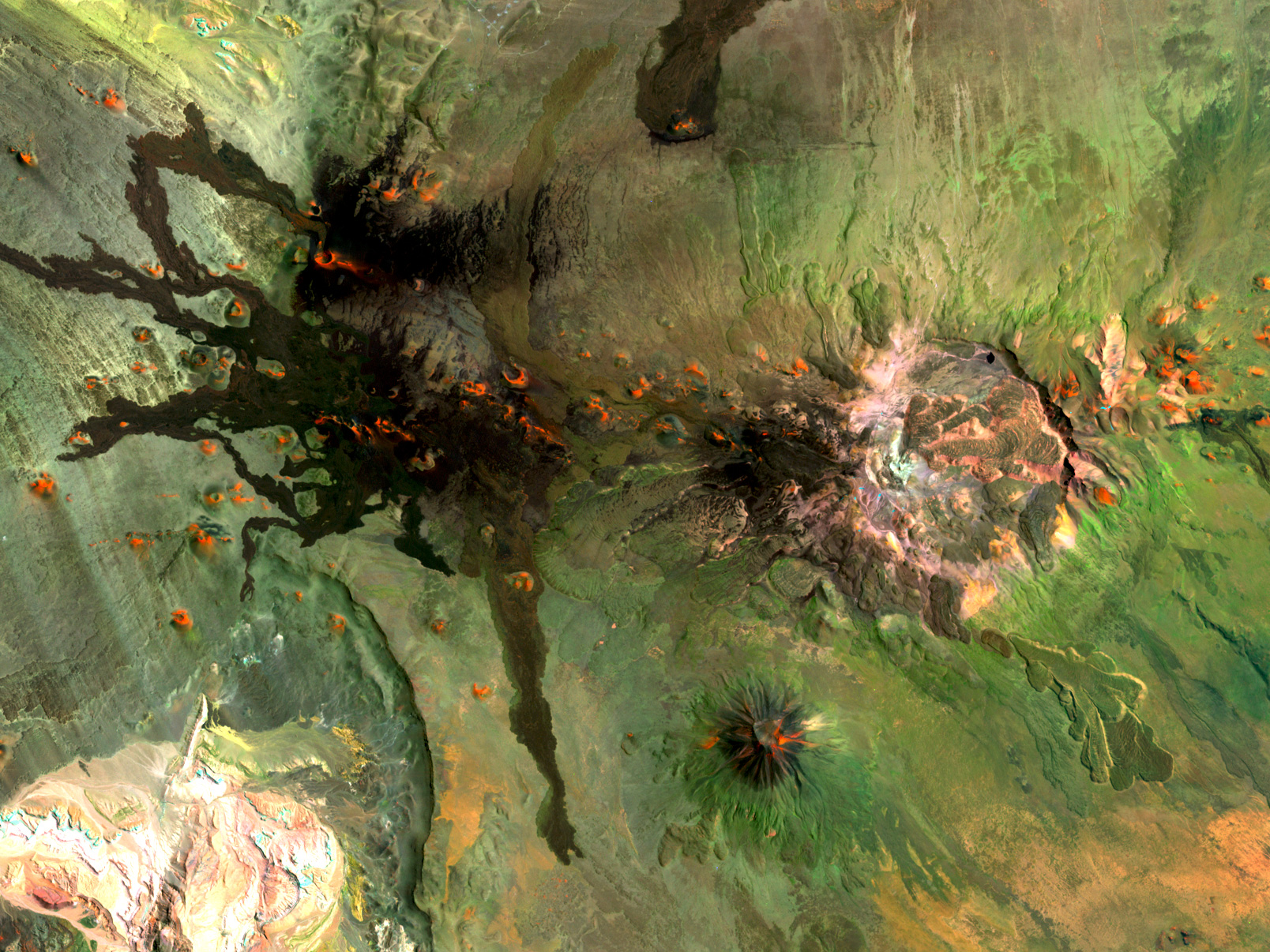
- Payún Matrú

Highest point
- Elevation: 3,715 m (12,188 ft)
- Coordinates: 36°25′19″S 69°14′28″W

Geography
- Location within Argentina
- Location: Argentina
- Parent range: Andes

Geology
- Mountain type: Shield volcano
- Last eruption: 445 ± 50 years ago

Payún Matrú is a shield volcano in the Reserva Provincial La Payunia of the Malargüe Department, south of the Mendoza Province in Argentina. It lies in the back-arc region of the Andean Volcanic Belt, and was formed by the subduction of the Nazca Plate beneath the South American Plate. Payún Matrú, along with the Llancanelo, Nevado and Salado Basin volcanic fields, form the Payenia province. It has been proposed as a World Heritage Site since 2011.

Payún Matrú developed on sediment and volcanic rocks ageing from the Mesoproterozoic to the Tertiary periods. It consists of a large shield volcano capped by a caldera, formed during a major eruption between 168,000 and 82,000 years ago, a high compound volcano (known as Payun or Payun Liso), and two groups of scoria cones and lava flows. The Pleistocene Pampas Onduladas lava flow reaches a length of 167–181 km (104–112 mi) and is the world's longest Quaternary lava flow.

Volcanic activity at Payún Matrú commenced during the Plio-Pleistocene period, and generated lava fields such as Pampas Onduladas, the Payún Matrú shield volcano and the Payun volcano. After the formation of the caldera, volcanism continued both within the caldera as lava domes and flows, and outside of it with the formation of scoria cones and lava flows east and especially west of Payún Matrú. Volcanic activity continued into the Holocene until about 515 years ago; oral tradition of local inhabitants contains references to earlier eruptions.

== Name ==
In local dialect, the term Payún or Paium means "bearded", while the term Matru translates as "goat". The field is sometimes also known as Payenia.

== Geography and geomorphology ==
=== Regional ===
Payún Matrú lies in the Malargüe Department of the Mendoza Province, in Argentina. The area is inhospitable due to the lack of usable water and high elevation. Nevertheless, there are many paved roads such as National Route 40 which passes west of the field, and National Route 186 which runs around its northern and eastern parts. In the early 20th century, the area was prospected for copper mining. The volcano is within the Reserva Provincial La Payunia. Owing to the variety of volcanic landforms, the province was included in the 2010 Tentative List of UNESCO World Heritage Sites and a number of potential geosites have been identified at Payún Matrú itself.

The active field is part of the backarc area of the Southern Volcanic Zone, a 1,000 km (620 mi) long volcanic arc and one of four eruptive belts in the Andes; the other three being the Northern Volcanic Zone, the Central Volcanic Zone and the Austral Volcanic Zone. Other volcanoes in the region include the Laguna del Maule, almost due west from Payún Matrú.

=== Local ===
Payún Matrú is a 15 km-wide (9.3 mi) shield volcano whose foot coincides with the 1,750 m (5,740 ft) elevation contour and which extends mainly east–west; rising about 2 km (1.2 mi) above the surrounding terrain it covers about 5,200 km^{2} (2,000 sq mi) of land with lava and has diverse landforms. Ignimbrites cover and flatten its northern and eastern slopes, while in the west and south lava domes and coulées (Note: A coulée is a particular type of lava dome which has flowed sideward like a lava flow.) predominate; these have often rough surfaces and are difficult to traverse. The lower slopes are more gentle and covered by Pleistocene-Holocene lava flows. Wind erosion has created flutes, grooves and yardangs within the ignimbrites, such as in the western sector where yardangs reach heights of 8 m (26 ft) and widths of 100 m (330 ft). The total volume of this shield is about 240 km^{3} (58 cu mi).

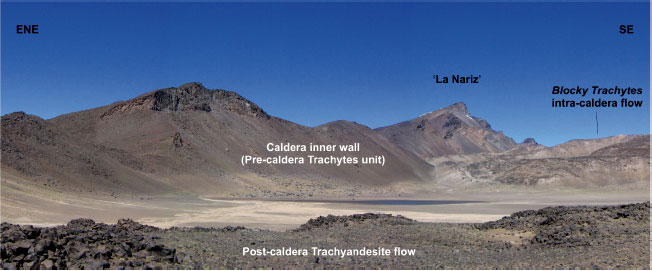
View from within the caldera

A 7–8 km-long (4.3–5.0 mi) and 480 m-deep (1,570 ft) caldera lies in the summit region of the shield and covers a surface area of about 56 square kilometres (22 sq mi). It is surrounded by several peaks, which clockwise from north include the 3,650 m-high (11,980 ft) Nariz/Punta del Payún, the Punta Media, the 3,450 m-high (11,320 ft) Punta Sur and the approximately 3,700 m-high (12,100 ft) Cerro Matru or Payen. In the field however Cerro Matru appears smaller than Nariz. The caldera was once 8–9 km (5.0–5.6 mi) wide but erosion of its flanks and later activity have reduced its size and buried the rim below coulées, lava domes, lava flows and pumice cones that were emplaced after the caldera collapse. The exception are the northern and southern walls which are almost vertical; remnants of old andesitic and trachyandesitic volcanism crop out there. The caldera also contains a permanent lake known as "Laguna" that is fed by snowmelt and by occasional rainfall.

Matrú's highest active point field is the 3,796 m (12,454 ft) high, conical, eroded Payun stratovolcano. It is also known as Payun Liso, Payún and Payún Liso. This volcano rises 1.8 km (1.1 mi) from the southern side of Payún Matrú, 10 km (6.2 mi) away from the caldera. It has a summit crater open to the north and it has a volume of about 40 km^{3} (9.6 cu mi).

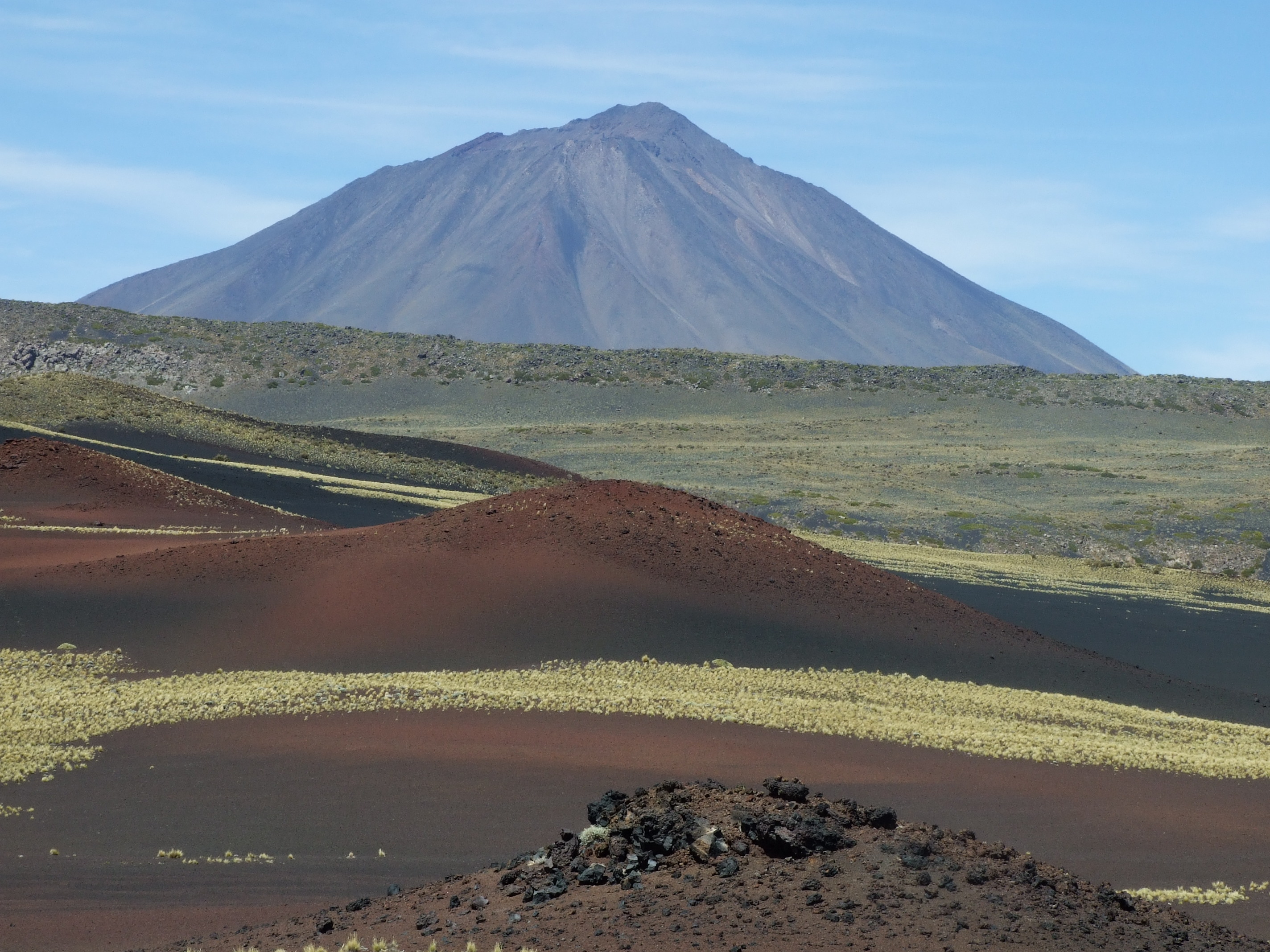
The Payun volcano

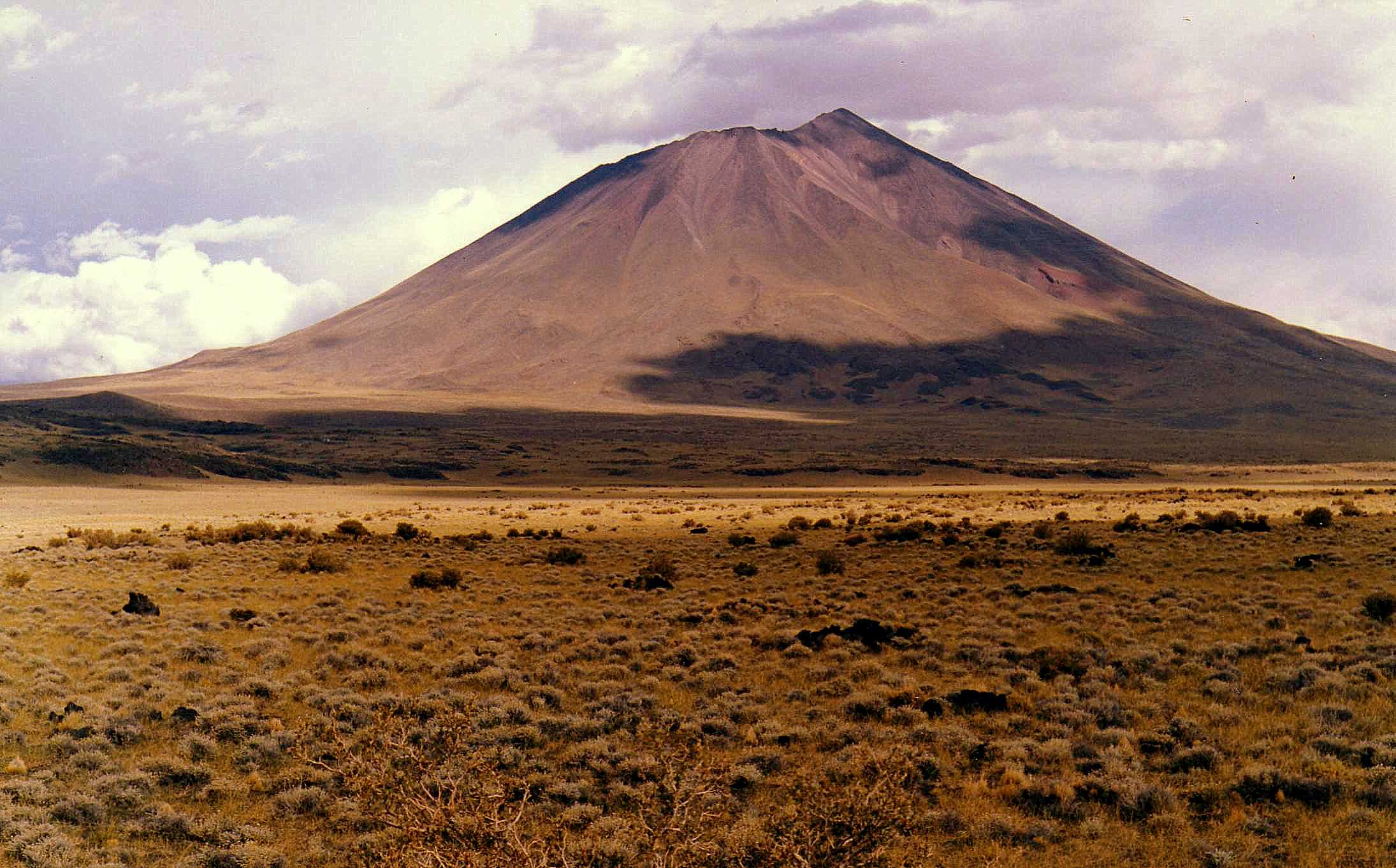
The Payun volcano

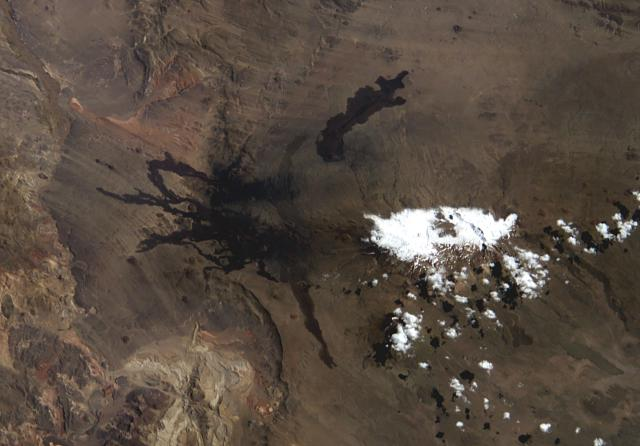
Payún Matrú seen from space

==== Payún Matrú volcanic field ====
Aside from the caldera, the field contains about 300 individual volcanic vents with diverse morphologies distributed in a western Los Volcanes group that reaches to the Rio Grande River and the eastern Guadaloso and El Rengo groups. These fields are also known as West Payún Matrú or West Payén and East Payún Matrú or East Payén, respectively. Two further ruptures, known as "Chapua" and "Puente", have been identified east of Payún Matrú. All these groups include fissure vents, lapilli cones, scoria cones and strombolian cones. These edifices are up to 225 m (738 ft) high and are associated with lava flows and pyroclastic units; the vents in the Los Volcanes group are spread across two separate belts. Wind-driven ash transport has formed ash tails at individual vents.

Older lava flows have pahoehoe surfaces with lava tubes and pressure ridges, while Holocene flows are more commonly aa lava with blocky surfaces. Some flows have reached the Rio Grande River west of Payún Matrú, damming it; the river later cut through and formed table-like landforms and canyons. One of these is a slot canyon known as La Pasarela, where the structures of lava flows such as joints in the rocks and vesicles are clearly visible. The entire field covers an area of over 12,000 km^{2} (4,600 sq mi) and some of its flows have reached the Llancanelo Lake north of Payún Matrú and the Salado River in the east. The estimated volumes of the entire Payún Matrú volcano are as large as 350 km^{3} (84 cu mi); the volcanic edifice was generated mostly through Strombolian and Hawaiian eruptions.

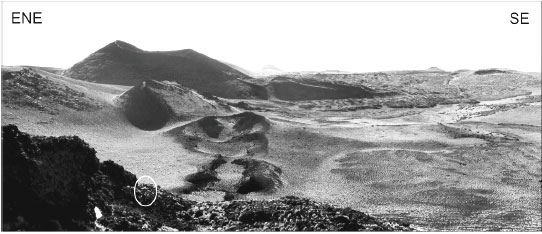
Cinder cones on the La Carbonilla fault

The cones are aligned along easterly or northeasterly lineaments which correlate with geological structures in the basement, and appear to reflect the tectonic stresses underground. Among these lineaments is the La Carbonilla fracture which runs in east–west direction and crops out in the eastern part of the field; in the central sector it is hidden by the caldera and in the western it is buried by lava flows. The La Carbonilla fracture is a fault that appears to have been an important influence on the development of the Payún Matrú complex in general. Fissural ridges and elongated chains of vents and cones highlight the control that lineaments exercise on the volcanic eruptions. In the summit area, pumice cones are aligned along the caldera rim.

Among the cones in Payún Matrú are the Plio-Pleistocene (5.333 million years ago until 11,700 years ago) Morados Grandes east and the cones around Pihuel volcano northeast of the field, respectively; the Guadalosos, La Mina and Montón de Cerros cones in the northern part of the field; and the Holocene cones in the eastern and western part of the field. Among these the Los Morados, Morado Sur and Volcán Santa María cones in the eastern and northeastern part of the field are uneroded and are probably of recent age. These cones are the source of conspicuous black lava flows in the western part of the field; some lava flows are over 30 km (19 mi) long.

- Los Morados is a complex of scoria cones and vents of different ages which during its emplacement underwent a sector collapse, intense Strombolian activity and a lava flow-induced rafting and re-healing of its slopes.
- On the southeast and east Los Morados is bordered by a lapilli plain, the Pampas Negras, which was formed by fallout of Strombolian eruptions and is being reworked by wind with the formation of dunes.
- Morado Sur consists of two aligned cones that formed in the same eruption and are covered with reddish deposits; it also features several vents and lava flows.
- Volcán Santa María is a cone with a small crater and also covered with red scoria and lava bombs. It is 180 m (590 ft) high and is associated with an area called "El Sandial", where lava bombs have left traces such as impact craters and aerodynamically deformed rocks.

==== Pampas Onduladas and other giant lava flows ====
Payún Matrú is the source of the longest Quaternary (last 2.58 million years ago) lava flow on Earth, the Pampas Onduladas lava flow in the eastern and northern sector of the volcanic field. The flow originates on the eastern side of the volcanic field in the La Carbonilla fault and eventually splits up into a shorter ("Llancanelo lava flow", 60–63 km (37–39 mi) long) northwestern and the longer southeastern branch which reaches all the way to an alluvial terrace of the Salado River in the La Pampa Province.

This compound lava flow moved over a gentle terrain and is covered by lava rises and lava tumuli especially in areas where the flow encountered obstacles in the topography. There is some variation in its appearance between a wide, leveled initial proximal sector and a more sinuous distal sector. The unusually fast flowing lava under the influence of its low viscosity and of a favourable topography eventually accumulated to a volume of at least 7.2 km^{3} (1.7 cu mi), a surface area of about 739 km^{2} (285 sq mi) and depending on the measurement a length of 167–181 km (104–112 mi). The process by which such long lava flows form has been explained as "inflation" whereby lava forms a crust that protects it from heat loss; the so protected lava flow eventually inflates from the entry of new magma, forming a system of overlapping and interconnected lava flow lobes. Such lava flows are known as "sheet flows". Parts of the Pampas Onduladas lava flow have been buried by more recent lava flows.

Together with the Þjórsá Lava in Iceland and the Toomba and Undara lava flows in Queensland, Australia, it is one of only a few Quaternary lava flows that reached a length of over 100 km (62 mi) and it has been compared to some long lava flows on Mars. Southwest from Pampas Onduladas lie the 181.2 kilometres (112.6 mi) long Los Carrizales lava flows, which have in part advanced to even larger distances than Pampas Onduladas but owing to a straighter course are considered to be shorter than the Pampas Onduladas lava flow, and the La Carbonilla lava flow which like Los Carrizales propagated southeastward and is located just west from the latter. Additional large lava flows are located in the western part of the field and resemble the Pampas Onduladas lava flow, such as the El Puente Formation close to the Rio Grande River of possibly recent age. Long lava flows have also been produced by volcanic centres directly south of Payún Matrú, including the 70–122 km (43–76 mi) long El Corcovo, Pampa de Luanco and Pampa de Ranquelcó flows.

==== Hydrography and non-volcanic landscape ====
Apart from the lake in the caldera, the area of Payún Matrú is largely devoid of permanent water sources, with most water sites that draw in humans being either temporary so-called "toscales" or ephemeral. Likewise, there are no permanent rivers in the field and most of the precipitation quickly seeps into the permeable or sandy ground. The whole massif is surrounded by sandy plains, which are simply volcanic rocks covered by aeolian sediments; the plains also feature small closed basins which are also found in the lavic area.

== Geology ==
West of South America, the Nazca Plate and the Antarctic Plate subduct beneath the South America Plate at a rate of 66–80 mm/a (2.6–3.1 in/year), giving rise to the Andean volcanic belt. The volcanic belt is not continuous and is interrupted by gaps where the subduction is shallower and the asthenosphere between the two plates missing. North of the Payún Matrú, flat slab subduction takes place; in the past flat slab subduction occurred farther south as well and had noticeable influence on magma chemistry. In general, the mode of subduction in the region over time has been variable.

There is evidence of Precambrian (older than 541 ± 0.1 million years ago) and Permian-Triassic (298.9 ±0.15 to 201.3 ±0.2 million years ago) volcanism (Choique Mahuida Formation) in the region, but a long hiatus separates them from the recent volcanic activity which started in the Pliocene (5.333–2.58 million years ago). At that time, the basaltic El Cenizo Formation and the andesitic Cerro El Zaino volcanics were emplaced. This kind of calcalkaline volcanic activity is interpreted to be the consequence of flat slab subduction during the Miocene (23.03-5.333 million years ago) and Pliocene, and took place between twenty and five million years ago. Later during the Pliocene and Quaternary the slab steepened, and probably as a consequence volcanism in the land above increased, reaching a peak between eight and five million years ago.

=== Local ===
The basement rock underneath Payún Matrú is formed by Mesoproterozoic (1,600–1,000 million years ago) to Triassic rocks of the San Rafael Block, Mesozoic (251.902 ± 0.024 to 66 million years ago) to Paleogene sediments of the Neuquén Basin and Miocene lava flows such as the Tertiary Patagonian basalts. The Andean orogeny during the Miocene has folded and deformed the basement, creating basins and uplifted basement blocks, and the Malargüe fold and thrust belt underlies part of the volcanic field. Oil has been drilled close to the volcanic field from sediments of Mesozoic age.

Payún Matrú is part of the backarc volcanic province, (Note: The backarc volcanic province is one of the two volcanic systems of the Southern Volcanic Zone, separate from the main volcanic system in the Andes.) 200 km (120 mi) east of the Andes and 530 km (330 mi) east of the Peru-Chile Trench. The volcanic activity still relates to the subduction of the Nazca Plate beneath the South America Plate, however; one proposed mechanism is that a Miocene change in the subduction regimen led to the development of extensional tectonics and of faults that form the pathways for magma ascent, while other mechanisms envisage changes in mantle characteristics.

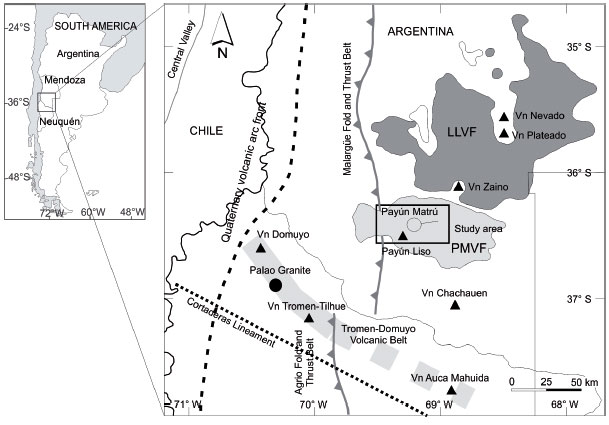
Geological context of the volcanoes

Other volcanic fields in the region are the Llancanelo volcanic field, the Nevado volcanic field and Salado Basin volcanic field; the first two lie north of Payún Matrú and the last south. These fields are subdivided on the basis of geochemical differences and consist of two stratovolcanoes (Payún Matrú itself and Nevado) and many monogenetic volcanoes. The volcanic field is part of the larger Payunia volcanic province, which covers an area of about 36,000 km^{2} (14,000 sq mi) in the provinces of La Pampa, Mendoza and Neuquén and is also known as the Payenia or Andino-Cuyana volcanic province. Monogenetic volcanism of mainly basaltic composition has been active here for millions of years accompanied by the formation of several polygenetic volcanoes and volcanoes like Agua Poca, generating more than eight hundred monogenetic cones although historical eruptions have not been observed. Further south are the Chachahuen and Auca Mahuida volcanoes, while the Tromen volcano is located southwest from Payún Matrú.

=== Lava and magma composition ===
The volcanic field has produced rocks with composition ranging from alkali basalts over basalts, trachyandesite, basaltic trachyandesite, trachybasalt and trachyte to rhyolite. They define a calc-alkaline volcanic suite with some variation between the various volcanic centres; Los Volcanes is formed mainly by calc-alkaline magmas while Payun and Payún Matrú are more potassium-rich and shoshonitic. The volcanic rocks contain variable amounts of phenocrysts, including alkali feldspar, amphibole, apatite, biotite, clinopyroxene, olivine, plagioclase and sanidine, but not all phenocryst phases can be found in every rock formation. Magma temperatures of 1,122–1,276 °C (2,052–2,329 °F) have been inferred.

Volcanic rocks erupted at Payún Matrú resemble ocean island basalt volcanism, implying a deep origin of the magma although a shallow origin cannot be ruled out. Magnetotelluric (Note: The magnetotelluric technique is a research technique, which exploits natural electromagnetic fields to obtain information on the electrical conductivity underground.) observations indicate the presence of a "plume"-like structure that rises from 200–400 km (120–250 mi) depth close to the edge of the Nazca Plate slab to underneath Payún Matrú; it may indicate that magma erupted in the volcanic field originates at such depths which would explain the ocean island basalt-like composition.

The magma ejected at Payún Matrú originates during partial melting of enriched mantle; the resulting melts then undergo crystal fractionation, assimilation of crustal material and magma mixing in magma chambers. The magmas eventually reach the surface through deep faults. The edifice of Payún Matrú acts as an obstacle to magmas ascending to the surface; this is why only evolved (Note: Evolved magmas are magmas which due to a settling of crystals have lost part of their magnesium oxide.) magmas are erupted in the caldera area of Payún Matrú while basic magmas reached the surface mainly outside of the main edifice.

Obsidian from Payún Matrú has been found in archeological sites, although its use was not widespread in the region perhaps owing to its low quality, the difficulty of accessing the volcanic complex and that human activity in Payunia only began comparatively late in the Holocene and mostly from the margins of the region. Further, Payun volcano is notable for large crystals of hematite pseudomorphs which originated in fumaroles.

== Climate, soils and vegetation ==
The climate at Payún Matrú is cold and dry with strong westerly winds. Annual temperature varies between 2 and 20 °C (36 and 68 °F) while the average temperature in the wider region is about 15 °C (59 °F) and the average annual precipitation amounts to 200–300 mm/a (7.9–11.8 in/year). Generally, the area of Payún Matrú is characterized by a continental climate with hot summers especially at lower elevations and cold winters especially at higher elevations. The climate is dry owing to the rainshadow effect of the Andes which block moisture bearing winds from reaching Payún Matrú, and strong winds and the evaporation associated with them reinforce the dryness. In the westerly part of the volcanic field most precipitation falls during winter under the influence of the Andes, while the eastern part has most precipitation occurring during summer. The higher parts of Payún Matrú may have risen above the snowline during ice ages, and periglacial landforms have been observed. Palynology data from south of the region indicate that the climate has been stable since the Late Pleistocene.

The vegetation in the volcanic field is mostly characterized by sparse bushes as well as herbaceous vegetation but few trees, and is classified as xerophytic. Soils are shallow and are mainly rocky to loess-like. Representative plant genera are Opuntia cactus and Poa and Stipa grasses. Payún Matrú is a refuge for a number of animals such as the armadillos, black-chested buzzard-eagle, condors, Darwin's rhea, guanaco, mara, Pampas fox or South American gray fox, puma and Southern viscacha. Some lizards may have evolved on the volcanoes.

== Eruptions ==
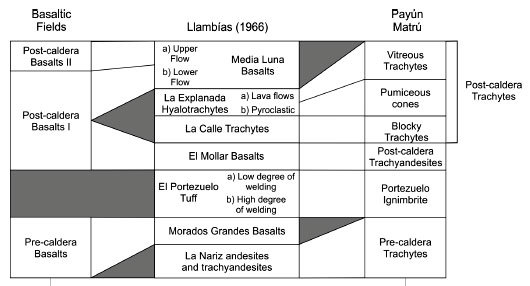
Stratigraphy of Payún Matrú

The geological history of the Payún Matrú volcanic field is poorly dated but the field has been active since Pliocene at least. The older volcanism appears to be located in the eastern part of the field where ages of 0.95 ± 0.5 to 0.6 ± 0.1 million years ago have been obtained by potassium-argon dating. Lava flows have been subdivided into the older Puente Group and the younger Tromen Group formations, which are of Pleistocene to Pleistocene-Holocene age, respectively; a Chapua Formation of Plio-Pleistocene age has been defined as well. Farther south, Payún Matru lava flows have been classified as the more eroded Ranquilco Volcanics and the less eroded Arroyo Seco Volcanics. The eastern volcanism is also known as the Pre-caldera basaltic unit; a western counterpart to it is probably buried beneath younger eruption products.

The first volcanic activity occurred west and east of Payún Matrú and involved the emission of olivine basalt lava flows. The oldest rock formation linked to the volcanic field is 5.2-2.2 million years old. The long Pampas Onduladas lava flow was erupted 373,000 ± 10,000 years ago and buried parts of the 400,000 ± 100,000 years old Los Carrizales lava field; both have hawaiitic composition. The Payun volcano formed around 265,000 ± 5,000 years ago within a timespan of about 2,000–20,000 years. Its inferred eruption rate of 0.004 km^{3}/ka (0.00096 mi^{3}/ka) is similar to typical volcanic arc eruption rates such as at Mount St. Helens.

The main Payún Matrú massif formed in about 600,000 years, with the oldest trachytic rocks dated to 700,000 years ago. It is comprised by the lavic and ignimbritic Pre-caldera Trachyte unit and consists of trachyandesitic to trachytic rocks, with trachyte being the most important component. The massif may have formed a tall edifice like the Payun volcano before caldera collapse.

The formation of the caldera coincides with the eruption of the Portezuelo Ignimbrite/Portezuelo Formation and took place between 168,000 ± 4,000 and 82,000 ± 2,000 years ago. (Note: A younger age of 4,860 ± 400 years ago has also been proposed.) This ignimbrite formation where it is not buried by younger eruption products spreads radially around the caldera and reaches a maximum exposed thickness of 25 metres (82 ft); it covers an area of about 2,200 km^{2} (850 sq mi) on the northern and southern sides of Payún Matrú, and its volume is estimated to be about 25–33 km^{3} (6.0–7.9 cu mi). The event was probably precipitated by the entry of mafic magma in the magma chamber and its incomplete mixing with pre-existent magma chamber melts, or by tectonic processes; the resulting Plinian eruption generated an eruption column, which collapsed, producing the ignimbrites. Different layers of magma in the magma chamber were erupted during the course of the eruption and eventually the summit of the volcano collapsed as well, forming the caldera; activity continued and emplaced lava domes and lava flows in the caldera area. These post-caldera volcanic formations are subdivided into three separate lithofacies.

Basaltic and trachyandesitic activity continued after the formation of the caldera. Morphology indicates that the El Rengo and Los Volcanes volcanic cones appear to be of Holocene age, while the Guadaloso vents formed during the Plio-Pleistocene. One age from the eastern side is 148,000 ± 9,000 years ago, it comes from northeast of the Payún Matrú caldera.

Uneroded volcanic cones and dark basaltic lavas indicate that activity continued into the Holocene. Large lava flows were erupted during the Holocene and covered extensive areas, burying the vegetation and impeding human settlement of the region until the late Holocene. Oral tradition by a local indigenous tribe indicate that volcanic activity occurred within the last several centuries, although no eruptions have been observed since the European settlement. Future volcanic eruptions would be unlikely to constitute a hazard given the low population density of the area, although roads might be interrupted and lava dams might form in rivers. It is considered Argentina's 24th most dangerous volcano out of 38.

Various dating methods have yielded various ages for late Pleistocene-Holocene volcanic eruptions:

- 44,000 ± 2,000 years ago, surface exposure dating.
- 43,000–41,000 ± 3,000 years ago, surface exposure dating, El Puente Formation. Basaltic lava flows of this formation reach ages of about 320,000 ± 5,000 years, implying a prolonged history of emplacement.
- 41,000 ± 1,000 years ago, underlying the Los Morados lava flow.
- 37,000 ± 3,000 years ago, surface exposure dating, close to the Rio Grande River.
- 37,000 ± 1,000 years ago, La Planchada fallout deposit.
- 37,000 ± 2,000 years ago, northwestern side of the caldera.
- 28,000 ± 5,000 years ago, potassium-argon dating, lava flow on the westerly side.
- 26,000 ± 5,000 years ago, potassium-argon dating, close to the Rio Grande.
- 26,000 ± 2,000 years ago, potassium-argon dating, not the same as the 26,000 ± 5,000 flow.
- 26,000 ± 1,000 years ago, potassium-argon dating, rhyolitic lava flow in the La Calle group.
- 20,000 ± 7,000 years ago, north of the Payún Matrú caldera.
- 16,000 ± 1,000 years ago, underlying the Los Morados lava flow.
- 15,200 ± 900 years ago, potassium-argon dating, lava flow on the northwesterly-westerly side.
- 9,000 years ago, potassium-argon dating.
- 7,000 ± 1,000 years ago, potassium-argon dating, Escorial del Matru within the caldera.
- <7,000 years ago, potassium-argon dating, trachyandesitic lava flow in the western part of the field.
- 6,900 ± 650 years before present, thermoluminescence dating on the Guadalosos cones on an eastward running fracture.
- 4,670 ± 450 years before present, thermoluminescence dating.
- 3,700 ± 300 years before present, pumice fallout in and east of the caldera.
- 3,400 ± 300 years before present, trachytic lava flows.
- 2,000 ± 2,000 years ago, surface exposure dating, young looking lava flow in the west.
- 1,705 ± 170 years before present, trachytic volcanic bombs.
- 1,470 ± 120 years before present, thermoluminescence dating on Volcán Santa María although a much older age of 496,000 ± 110,000 years ago has also been given.
- 515 ± 50 years before present, thermoluminescence dating on Morado Sur cone and on the Pampas Negras lapilli field.
- 445 ± 50 years before present, lava domes on the caldera margin.

== See also ==
- List of volcanoes in Argentina
