= Reserva Provincial La Payunia =

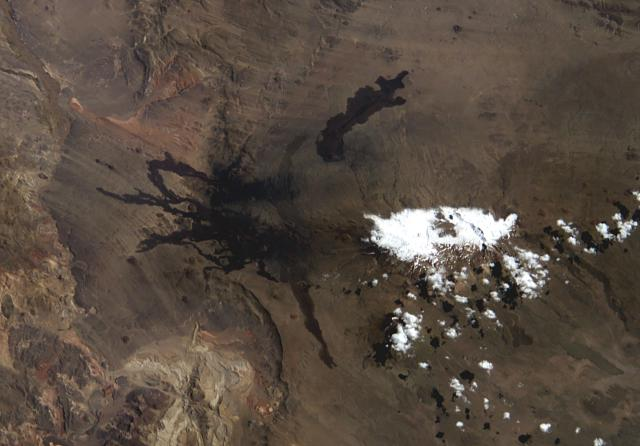
- View from space of the Payún Matrú volcano
- Interactive map of Reserva Provincial La Payunia
- Location: Mendoza Province, Argentina
- Nearest city: Malargüe city
- Coordinates: 36°25′S 69°12′W
- Area: 4,500 km^{2} (1,700 sq mi)
- Established: 1988

The Reserva Provincial La Payunia (Spanish: La Payunia Provincial Reserve) also known as Payún or Payén is a natural reserve located in the Malargüe Department in the southern part of Mendoza Province, Argentina, about 160 km away from Malargüe city. It was declared as nature preserve in 1988 and has an area of 4,500 km^{2}. La Payunia is home to volcanic cones including the Payún Matrú volcano.

== Biodiversity ==
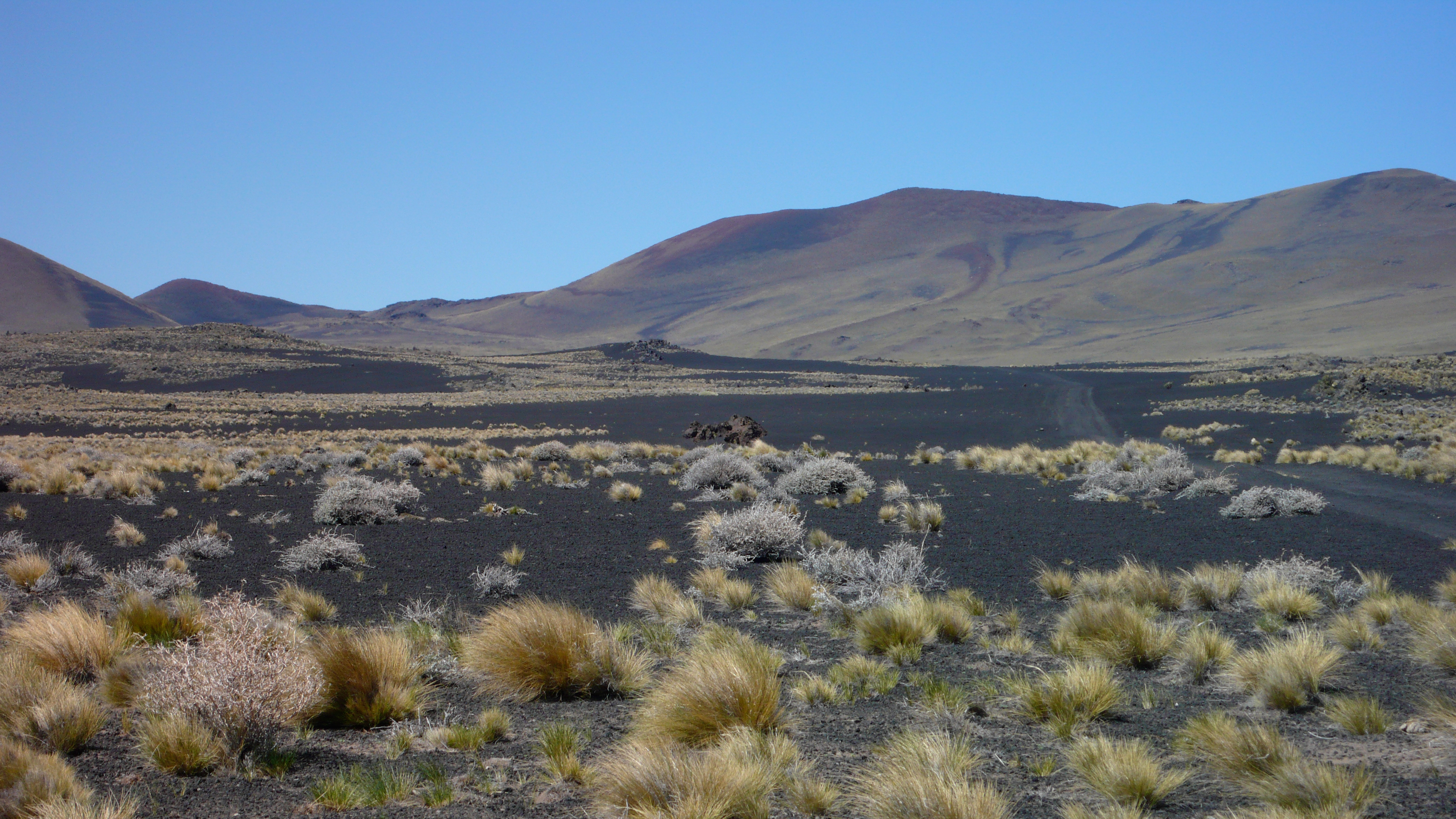
Landscape with vegetation in La Payunia.

- Flora:

The flora is represented by matorrales, prairies, native mountain species and other typical patagonian plants such as Adesmia pinifolia, Festuca pallescens, Grindelia chiloensis, Ephedra ochreata miers, Neosparton ephedroides grisebach, Psila spartioides, Prosopis denudans (between 500 and 1,300 m AMSL) and Schinus poligamun and Larrea nítida cavanilles (between 1,800 and 2,850 m AMSL).

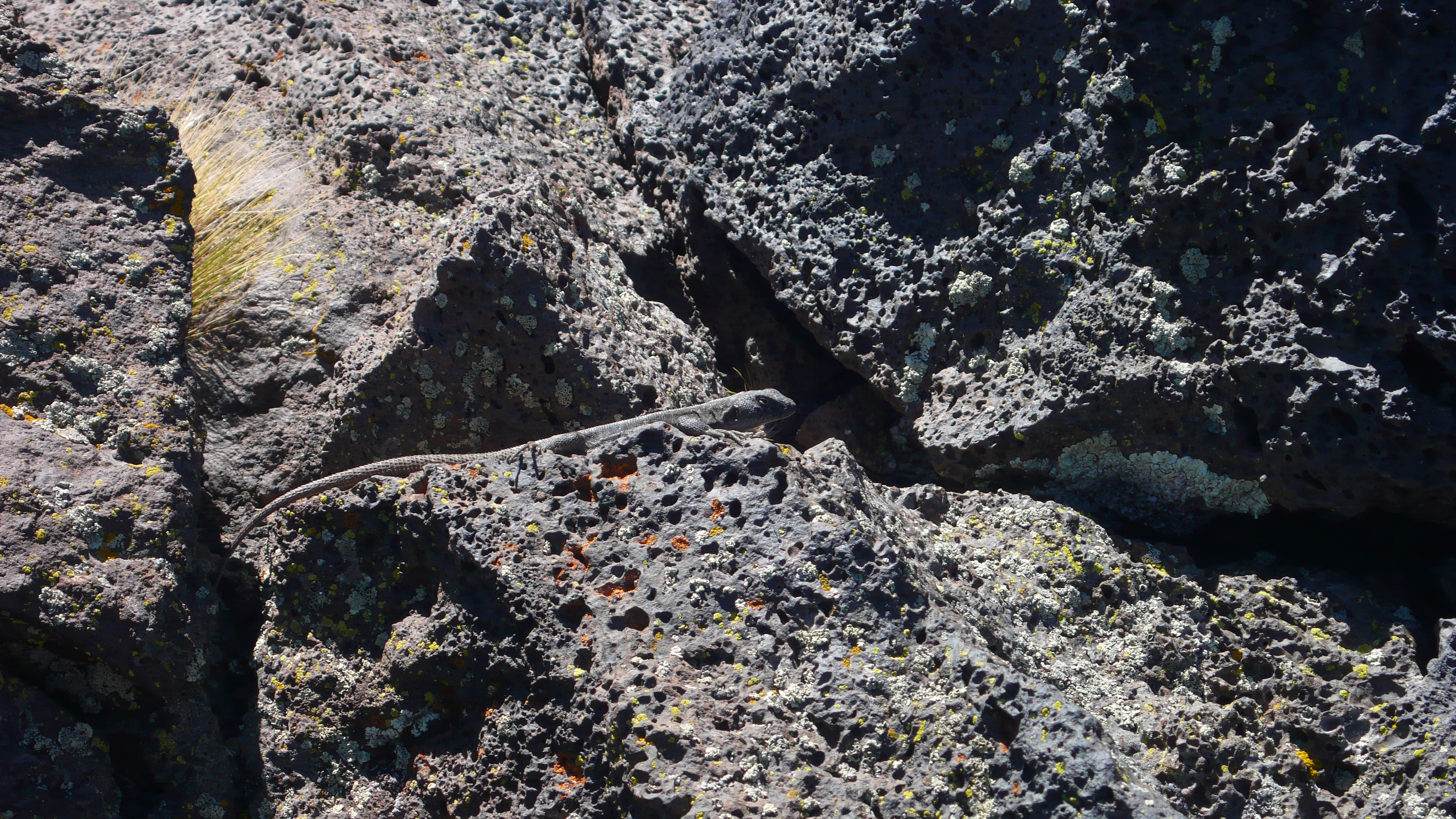
Lizard camouflaged on the volcanic rocks in La Payunia.

- Fauna:

Over 70 animal species have been documented on the reserve. Common bird species include the Andean condor Vultur gryphus, Darwin's rhea Rhea pennata, and flamingo. Reptiles include venomous snakes such as the Patagonian pit viper Bothrops ammodytoides and crossed pit viper Bothrops alternatus. Predators include the mountain lion Puma concolor, South American gray fox Pseudalopex griseus, culpeo fox Lycalopex culpaeus and pampas cat Leopardus pajeros. Other mammals include a large rodent, the plains viscacha Lagostomus maximus, and the largest native animal on the reserve, the guanaco Lama guanicoe. A cooperative of around 20 families, Cooperativa Payun Matru, live on the reserve. They round up the wild guanaco every year and shear the animals for their fur. The annual round up is monitored by the Wildlife Conservation Society, and wool and yarn are exported abroad.

== Geography ==
The area is covered by many small volcanoes, and the biggest are Payún Matrú, Payún Liso and Santa María. Volcanic ash forms a black terrain known as Pampas Negras (Spanish: Black Pampas).

The Grande River flows in the zone across volcanic rocks cracks.
