= Lacustrine plain =

Lakes filled by sediment

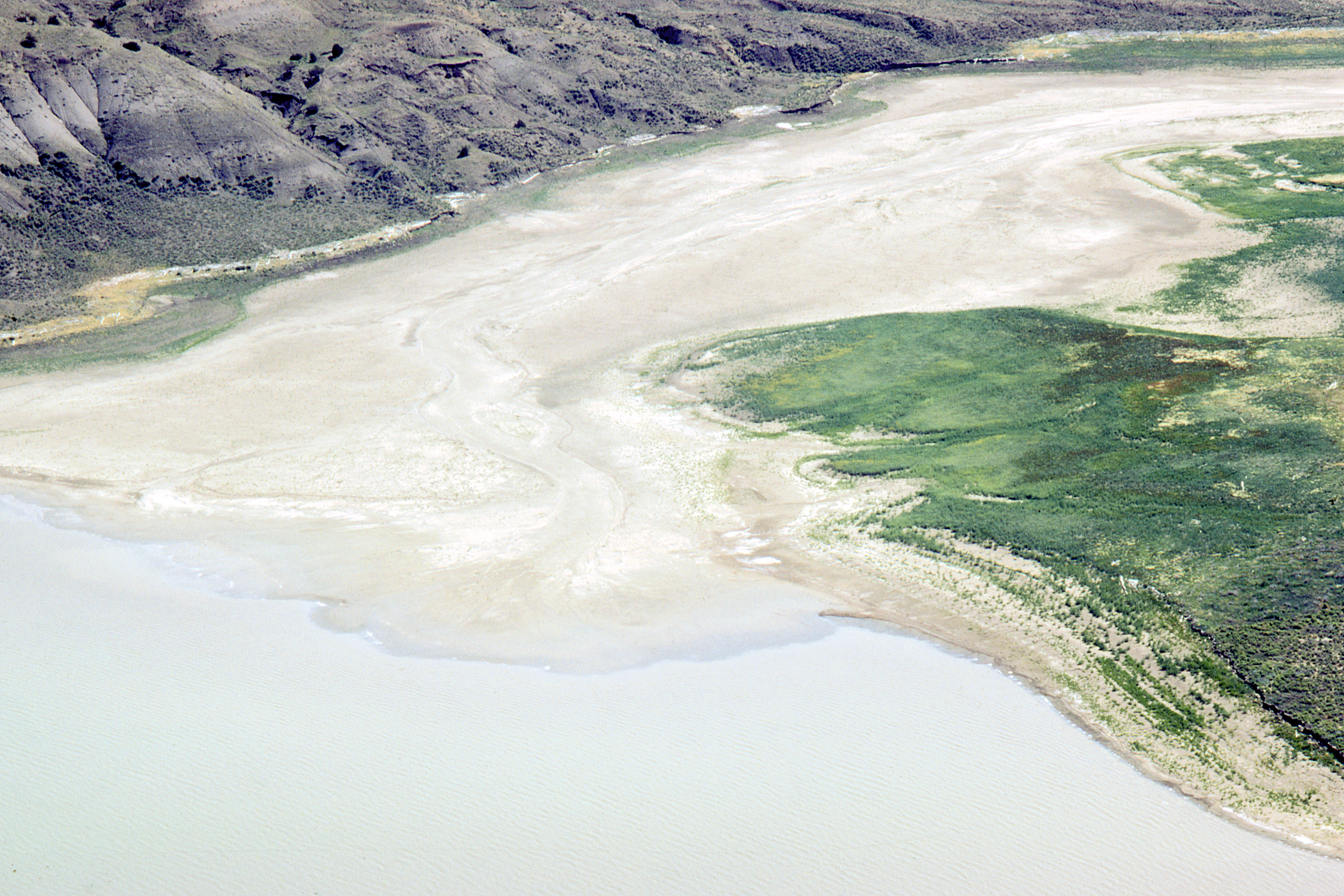
Sediment deposition in Garfield County, Montana

A lacustrine plain or lake plain is a plain formed due to the past existence of a lake and its accompanying sediment accumulation. Lacustrine plains can be formed through one of three major mechanisms: glacial drainage, differential uplift, and inland lake creation and drainage. Lake plains can have various uses depending on where and how they form.

Over time, in regions where a lake once existed, as water drains or evaporates from the lake, the deposited sediments are left behind, resulting in a level plain of land where the lake once existed. The soil of the plain may constitute fertile and productive farmland due to the previous accumulation of lacustrine sediments; in other cases, it may become a wetland or a desert.

== Background ==
Lacustrine plains are plains formed when lakes filled with sediments are drained. There are several reasons why drainage might occur, but in all cases the water in the lake is lost, leaving behind a level land of sediments. The resulting plain is an area of flat land which is often rich in fine-grained sediments. Depending on geologic and climatic factors, the once-lake region may turn into a desert or wetland. In other cases, lacustrine plains may have agricultural value.

== Origins of lacustrine plains and their formation mechanisms ==
The origins of lacustrine plains are lakes formed under different circumstances. Lake plains resulting from the drainage of glacial lakes are called glaciolacustrine plains, which differ from those resulting from differential uplifts and those from the creation of inland lakes.

=== Glacial drainage ===
Glaciolacustrine plains form when the lakes in the continental ice sheets drain and leave the rocky debris within behind. The most recent ice age, the Wisconsin, was a drive for glacial lake formation and the glaciolacustrine plain formation that followed. Glacial lakes are grouped into categories which represent the conditions in which they form. Lake formations depending on the existence of active glaciers are different from those depending on the proximity of the lake to glaciers and those depending on glacier retreats. Regardless of the difference in those glacial lakes' formation conditions, lakes that are trapped inside ice walls drain after the ice walls melt, and the sediments in the lakes form glaciolacustrine plains.

==== Examples of glaciolacustrine plain formations ====
Glaciolacustrine plain formations can be found in a variety of places. For instance, Lake Agassiz-Ojibway Basin in northwestern Quebec is a good example of lacustrine plain formation caused by the ice readvance and drainage of Lake Ojibway. By analyzing the varve sequences and dividing them into the Matagami section and La Reine section, researchers were able to determine the time of occurrence for a major ice readvance event in the area and two drainage events in the lake. It was concluded that two drainage events separated by approximately 65 years led to the final drainage of the lake and the formation of the glaciolacustrine Agassiz-Ojibway Basin.

Other locations of glaciolacustrine plains include Lake Erie, Saginaw Bay in Lake Huron, and the Lake Superior lake plain.

=== Differential uplift ===
Lake plains caused by tectonic movements, or epeirogeny, constitute another type of lacustrine plain. Due to tectonic events, the uplift of crusts may occasionally lead to the formation of basins. Later, as water fill the region, a lake is formed. Various factors may contribute to the drainage of the lakes formed in such fashion, and the sediments form a large, flat plain where the lakes once existed.

==== Examples of differential uplift lacustrine plain formations ====
Lacustrine plains formed by differential uplift can be found in multiple locations, and they are most commonly seen in Africa. The Nile drainage system, for example, is a drainage system formed by mantle plumes activity induced tectonic uplift, forming the Rwenzori and Virunga Mountains. This uplift led to a segmentation of the west East African Rift System and led to the difference in flowing directions of the rivers in the northwestern Main Ethiopian Rift and the eastern and western East African Rift System. The regional tectonics therefore contributed to a redirection of the rivers, causing the Paleo-lake Obweruka to break into smaller regional lakes and the drainage system to change.

Tectonics-induced lacustrine plain formation can also be found at the Congo Lake Plain and the Lake Plain of South Sudan.

=== Inland lake creation and drainage ===
While differential uplift can certainly create inland basins and lakes, many inland lakes are created due to a period of heavy and consistent rainfall that the region experiences. Like any other lake, lakes formed in inland basins are bound to face obliteration. As sediments deposit and accumulate at the bottom of the lake and as water drains due to environmental forces and geologic events, the lake gradually approaches its full state. A lacustrine plain is then formed when drainage reaches completion, and the lake becomes a plain of sediments.

==== Examples of inland lake creation and drainage ====
One example of inland lake creation in once arid land is Lake Eyre in South Australia. The Lake Eyre North basin formed due to tectonic subsidence, and repeating glacial cycles and climatic cycles led to wet and dry cycles in the lake where the state of the lake changed drastically. Lake Eyre is currently a playa, indicating that it is in a relatively arid episode. However, it was much wetter when it was in flood-dominated episodes, and it held more water than its current ephemeral state.

The Chad Basin Plain is also a good example of inland lacustrine plain formation. By conducting facies analysis, researchers are able to determine four lithofacies associations for the Chad Basin, and thus the sequences of the Chad Basin's formation. Those lithofacies with little plant debris indicate a period of aridity and represent the last sequence of Chad formation where a lacustrine plain existed.

Other examples of inland lake creation, drainage, and lake plain formation can be found at plains near the Caspian Sea and the Lake Bonneville Plain.

== The value of lacustrine plains ==
=== Agriculture value ===
The Great Plains in North America are examples of the agricultural values of lacustrine plains. The flat lake plain where Lake Agassiz once existed now serves as a cropland for sugar beets and potatoes. Beneficial to the growth of the crops, the soils of the lacustrine plains in the Great Lakes region are fertile due to prior sedimentation, and the land is so flat that crops can thrive. The remaining glacial materials also provide essential nutrients for crop growth and thus boost farm productivity.

=== Paleoenvironmental reconstruction value ===
Lacustrine plains are also valuable in paleoenvironment and paleoclimate studies. By surveying the western lake plain of Llancanelo Lake in Argentina, researchers were able to gather geomorphological data and sedimentary evidence to reconstruct the extension of the lake in the past. It was concluded that the lake extended a larger territory in the past. In the case of Llancanelo Lake, the western lacustrine plain was a crucial factor in determining the evolution of the lake. A similar use of drainage areas and lacustrine plains can be found in a research done on the Congo. Sedimentation and drainage data collected through monitoring the Congo's drainage system provide valuable insight into the glacial stages and climate periods the region has gone through.

== See also ==
- Plain
- Alluvial plain
- Fluvial plain
- Till plain
- Glaciolacustrine deposits
