= Infiernillo (volcanic field) =

Volcanic field in Argentina

Infiernillo is a volcanic field in Argentina. The field is located northwest of Malargue, at the Rio Salado. The volcanic field, part of the Southern Volcanic Zone, has formed three individual vents with associated lava flows.

== Formation ==
Volcanic activity in the Andes and the region between the Andes and the Atlantic Ocean is caused by the subduction of the Nazca Plate beneath the South American Plate. While the main volcanic arc is formed by the dehydration of the descending slab of oceanic lithosphere, the origin of volcanism beneath the main volcanic arc is unclear. One of these volcanic structures is the Payenia volcanic field between 34°30′–38°S southern latitude; it was probably formed by magmas generated by asthenosphere overriding a steepening subducting Nazca Plate. This province, with a surface area of 60,000 square kilometres (23,000 sq mi), includes Payún Matrú and Llancanelo volcanic field.

The basement in the area is formed from Jurassic-Cretaceous sedimentary rocks and Tertiary volcanic rocks. Activity is controlled by tectonic extension 70 kilometres (43 mi) west of the Andes and has sent lava flows which reach the Rio Salado. The Infiernillo is part of a transitory region of the Southern Volcanic Zone between the northern and central segment thereof.

There are three vents named Hoyo Colorado, La Hoyada and Loma Negra. The first vent erupted 6890 ± 40 BCE as found by radiocarbon dating, while ages of 69,000 ± 50,000 and 34,000 ± 70,000 have been obtained on the other two centres, respectively. The oldest age in the field is 0.83 ± 0.11 mya; other dates found are less than 100,000-200,000 years old. These other volcanoes are located around Niña Encantada lake and include Mesillas and Lagunita.

Hoyada volcano is a crater with a diameter of 450 metres (1,480 ft). It is surrounded by tephra falls and forms a 2.5 kilometres (1.6 mi) long lava flow which after 1.5 kilometres (0.93 mi) splits into two branches. The presence of levees in the flow indicates that the flow rate diminished during the eruption. Lagunitas volcano conversely is a 150 metres (490 ft) high stratovolcano-like cone that generated a blocky lava flow 2.2 kilometres (1.4 mi) long. This lava flow also dammed an ephemeral stream, creating a lake. The Loma Negra cone is older than the Lagunitas one considering that the Lagunitas lava flow is deflected by the Loma Negra cone and lava. The Loma Negra cone formed a lava flow 1.7 kilometres (1.1 mi) long. A phreatic explosion at its margins formed the Nina Encantada lake. Hoyo Colorado is a cone which generated a complex lava field damming the Salado river. Hoyo Colorado has erupted approximately twice as much rock as the other three centres.

The first three cones all erupted basaltic andesite containing hornblende and matrix olivine and plagioclase. Hoyo Colorado is much more olivine-rich and contains amphibole. Major element analyses indicate similarity to the Planchon-Peteroa volcanic centre at the same latitude. The rare-earth element contents are transitional between Planchon-Peteroa and Patagonia alkali basalt signatures.

== See also ==
- List of volcanic fields
