= Witches' Cave =

Cave in Argentina

- Caverna de las Brujas
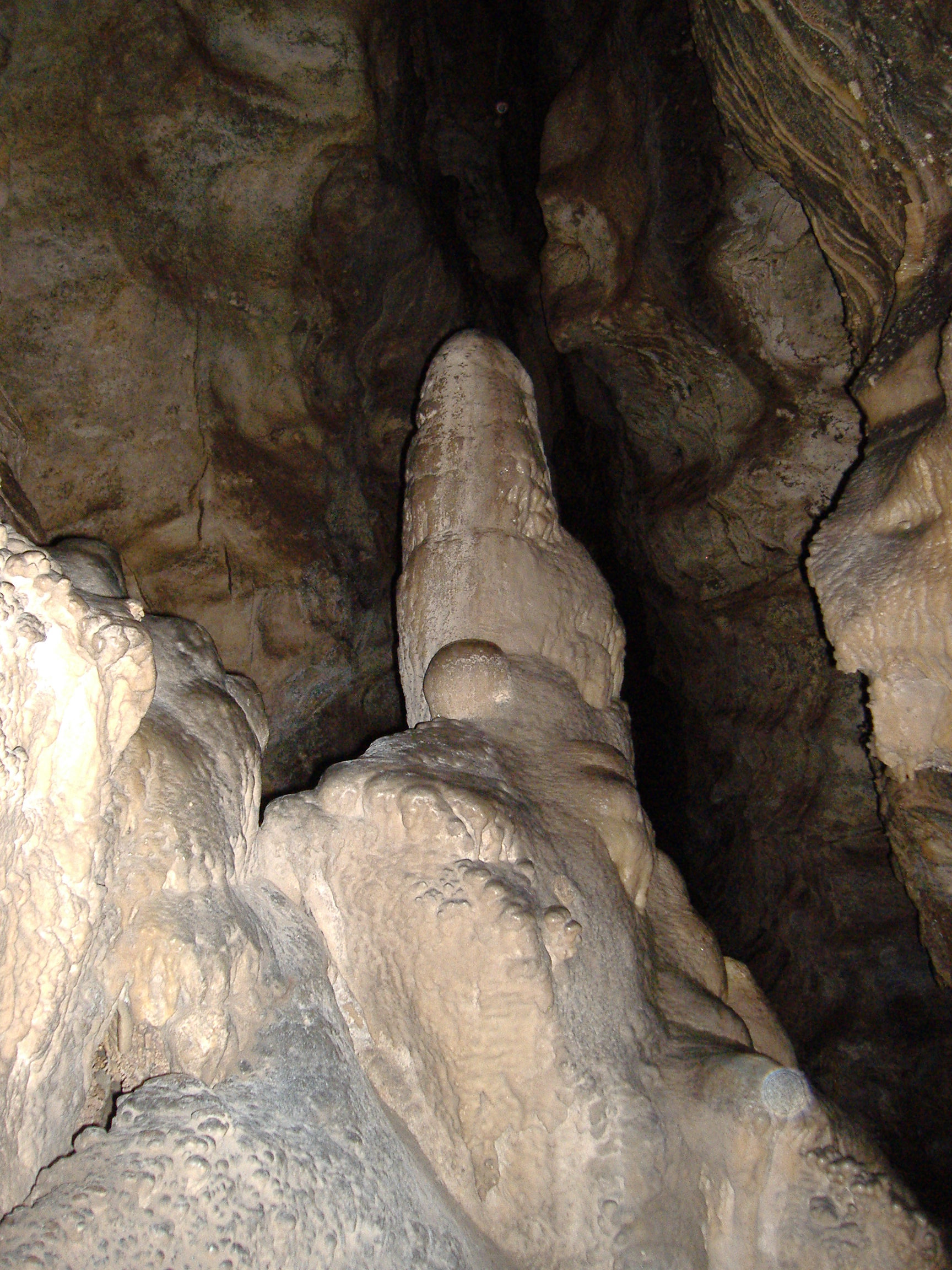
- A large stalagmite near the entrance of the Witches' Cave

- Location within Argentina
- Location: Malargüe Department, Mendoza
- Coordinates: 35°48′02″S 69°49′13″W
- Elevation: 1,830 m (6,000 ft)
- Geology: Jurassic limestone
- Access: Limited
- Registry: Reserva Provincial Caverna de las Brujas

The Witches' Cave (in Spanish, Caverna de las Brujas) is a cave, a nature reserve and a national natural monument in Argentina. It is located in the Moncol Hill, at 1,830 metres (6,000 ft) above mean sea level, within the Malargüe Department, in the south of Mendoza Province (Cuyo region), about 65 kilometres (40 mi) southwest of the town of Malargüe.

The cave covers an area of 4.5 square kilometres (1.7 sq mi) and was declared a provincial reserve (Reserva Provincial Caverna de las Brujas) in 1990. It is a solutional limestone cave, formed by Jurassic sedimentary rock that rose from the ocean as the Andes emerged during the Cenozoic Era. The rock was eroded by underground water currents and vertically fractured. Further erosion occurred at the end of the last Ice Age, when precipitation was much higher than today.

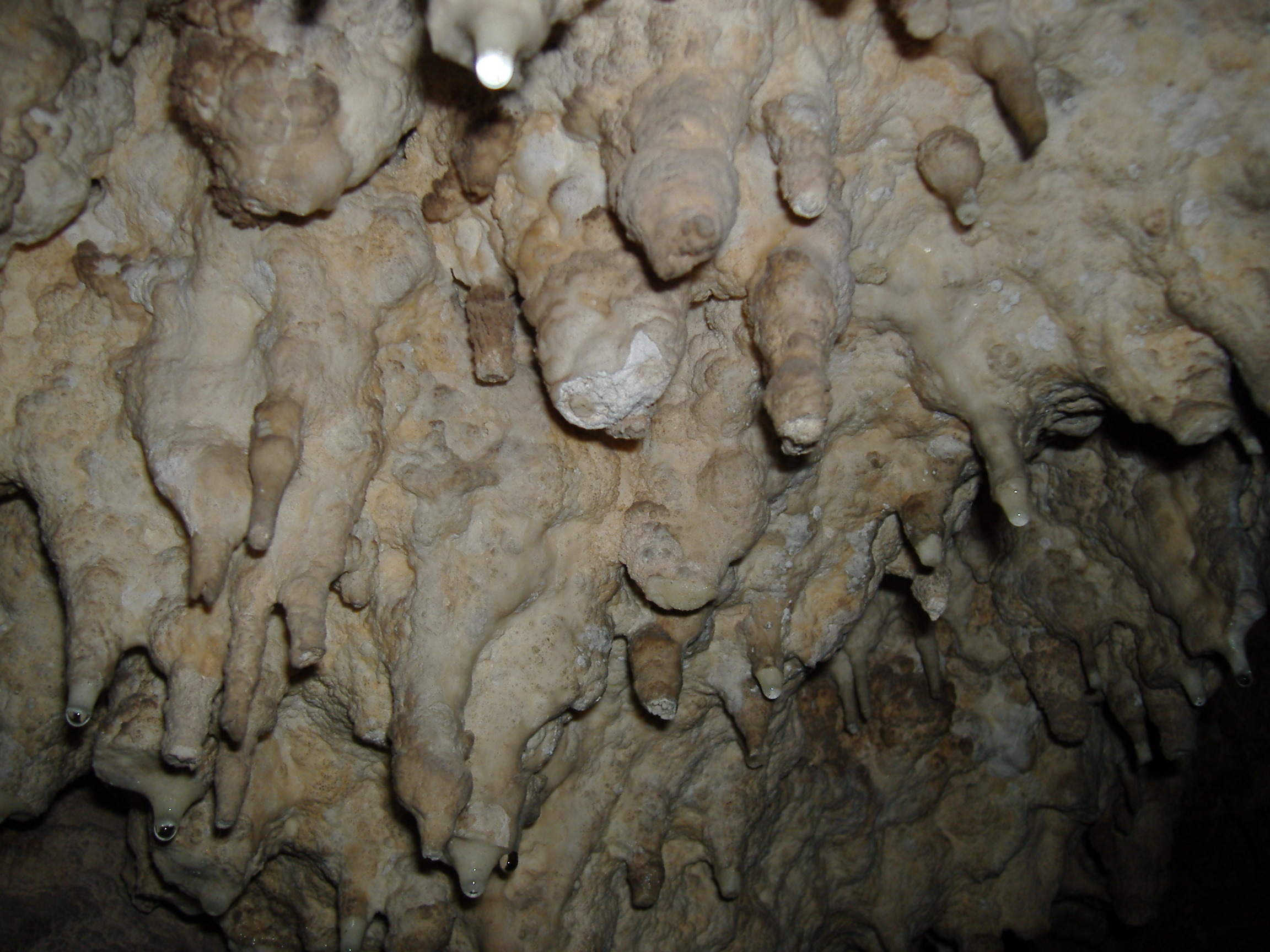
Stalactites damaged by visitors

The Witches' Cave is home to many speleothems (such as stalactites and stalagmites), deep underground water galleries, and large vaulted spaces called Sala de la Virgen (Virgin Room) and Las Flores (The Flowers). It hosts a particular fauna adapted to live without solar radiation (spiders and springtails). The galleries closest to the entrance are occasional shelters for bats and mice.

About 6 kilometres (3.7 mi) of the cave's passages have been explored. The site is one of the major tourist attractions in southern Mendoza, but visitors are only granted access (with a guide and proper equipment) to the first 200 metres (660 ft) of galleries, which are already damaged.
