= Glaciolacustrine deposits =

Sediments deposited into lakes that come from glaciers

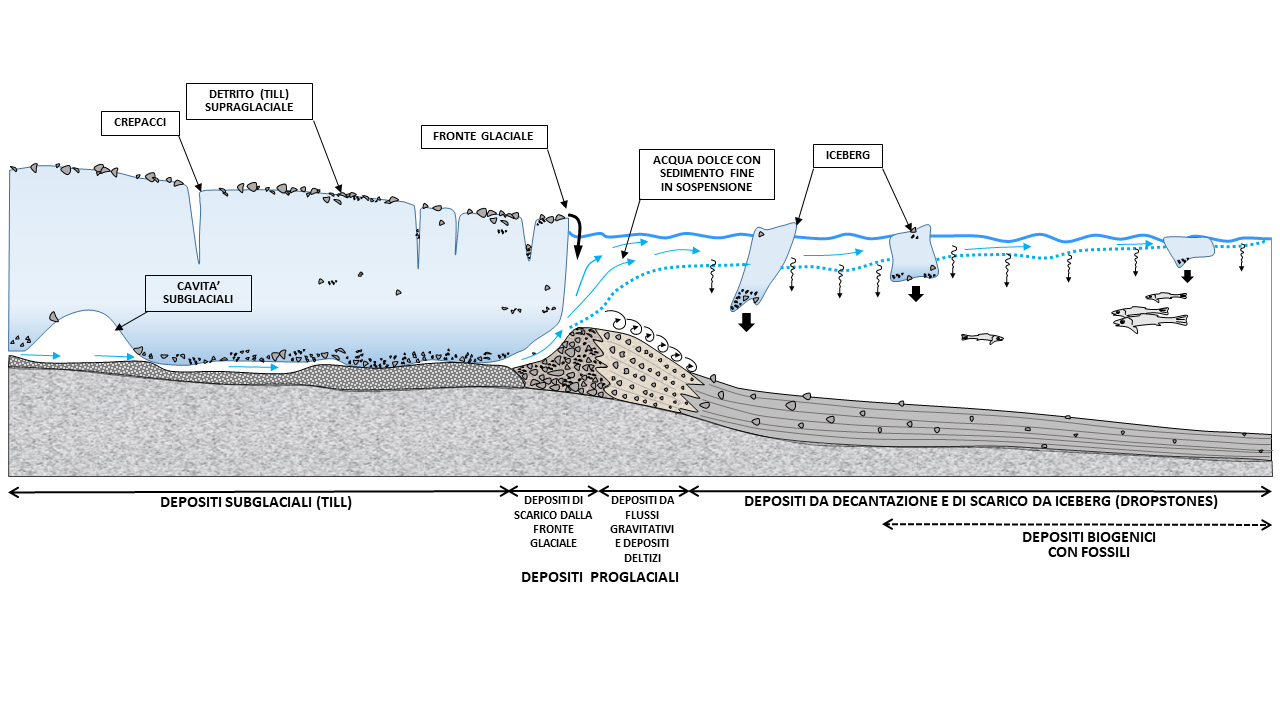
Sketch showing the main glacio-lacustrine (or glacio-marine) deposits & depositional processes.

Sediments deposited into lakes that have come from glaciers are called glaciolacustrine deposits. In some European geological traditions, the term limnoglacial is used. These lakes include ice margin lakes or other types formed from glacial erosion or deposition. Sediments in the bedload and suspended load are carried into lakes and deposited. The bedload is deposited at the lake margin while the suspended load is deposited all over the lake bed. Glaciolacustrine deposits commonly form varves, which are annually deposited layers of silt and clay, where silt is deposited during the summer, and clay during the winter.

== Bedload deposits ==
Sediments carried in the bedload of a stream, mostly sands and gravels, are deposited in deltas that form at the edges of lakes. These deposits will only be found near the edges of the lake.

== Suspended deposits ==
Sediments that are carried in the suspended load of a stream, commonly silts and clays, are transported into the lake in suspension or by currents along the lake floor. These are the principal deposits during the winter because of lack of melting of the glacier so the stream has a reduced discharge therefore carrying less coarse material. These sediments normally consist of fine-grained rhythmites that are laid down in layers known as varves or varvites. A varve represents an annual deposit of silt and clay. Sedimentation in deltas also occurs in rhythmic patterns as in the lake deposits, but they are thicker and contain coarse-grained materials instead of just silt and clay. As the varves get closer to the shoreline the clay layer will stay relatively the same thickness, but there will be an increase in thickness of the silt layer.

== See also ==
- Lacustrine plain
- Glaciofluvial deposits
