= Malargüe Department =

Malargüe Departamento Malargüe
- Department
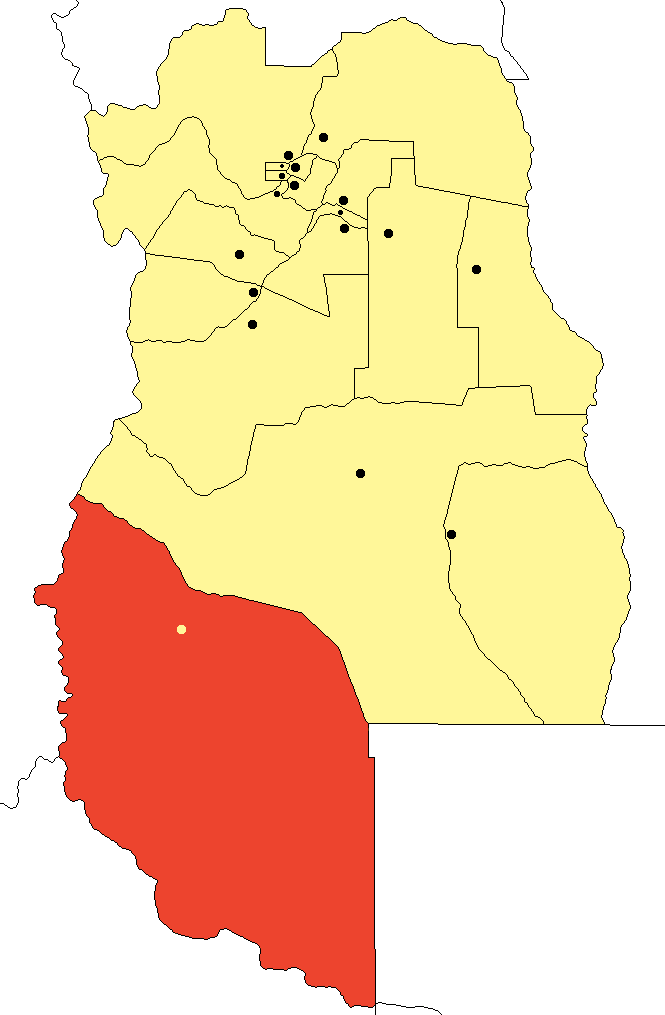
- location of Malargüe Department in Mendoza Province
- Coordinates: 36°10′S 69°20′W
- Country: Argentina
- Established: November 16, 1850
- Seat: Malargüe

Government
  - Intendant: Celso Jaque, PJ

Area
  - Total: 41,317 km^{2} (15,953 sq mi)

Population (2022 census [INDEC])
  - Total: 32,717
  - Density: 0.79185/km^{2} (2.0509/sq mi)
- Demonym: malargüino/na
- Postal Code: M5613
- IFAM: MZA010
- Area Code: 02627
- Patron saint: Nuestra Señora del Rosario
- Website: www.malargue.gov.ar

Malargüe is a department located in the south west of Mendoza Province in Argentina. Its borders are San Rafael in the north, La Pampa Province in the east, Neuquén Province in the south and Chile to the west.

The provincial subdivision has a population of about 23,000 inhabitants in an area of 41,317 km^{2} (15,953 sq mi), and its capital city is Malargüe, which is located around 1,180 km (730 mi) from the federal capital Buenos Aires.

== Geography ==
The south of Malargüe Department is considered the northern tip of Patagonia and is home to many nature reserves such as La Payunia, Castillos de Pincheira, Caverna de las Brujas and Laguna de Llancanelo.

=== Districts ===
The department is divided into four districts:

- Agua Escondida
- Malargüe
- Río Barrancas
- Río Grande

=== Hydrology ===
Malargüe has many hydric resources. Among its most important rivers are the Grande River, the Colorado River, the Barrancas River and the Malargüe River, and the lagoons of Llancanelo, Negra and Niña Encantada.

== Science ==
Malargüe is home to the Pierre Auger Observatory, an observatory designed to detect ultra-high-energy cosmic rays.

== Tourism ==
This region boasts many fascinating natural landmarks and is exceptionally well-suited for thrilling tourist activities such as mountaineering, paragliding, rafting, and kayaking. Notable attractions here include ‘Castillos de Pincheira,’ ‘Tigre Cave,’ and ‘Brujas Cave.’ Additionally, the area features ‘Pozo de las Ánimas’—a pair of adjacent natural sinkholes reaching depths of up to 101 meters—where the wind, as it passes through, often creates a distinct whistling or wailing sound.

Malargüe Department is home to the famous skiing resort of Las Leñas.

== Gallery ==
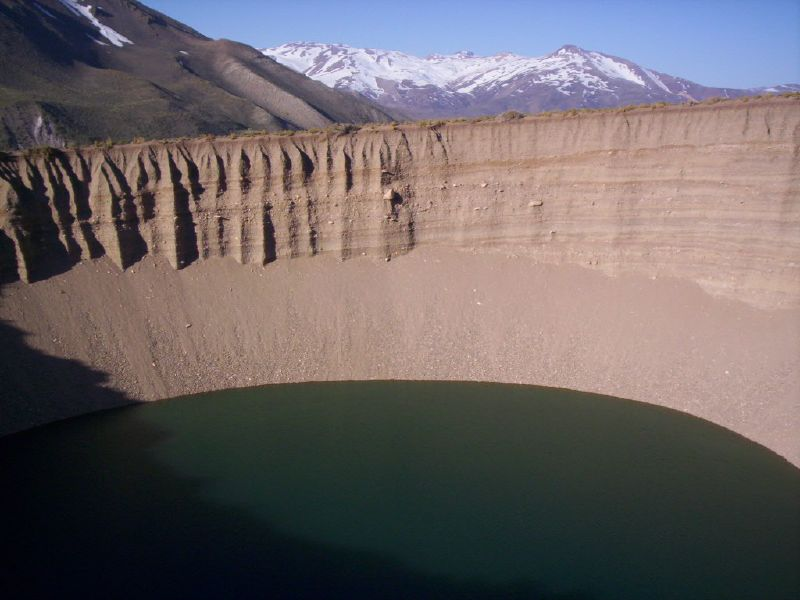
Las Animas Well

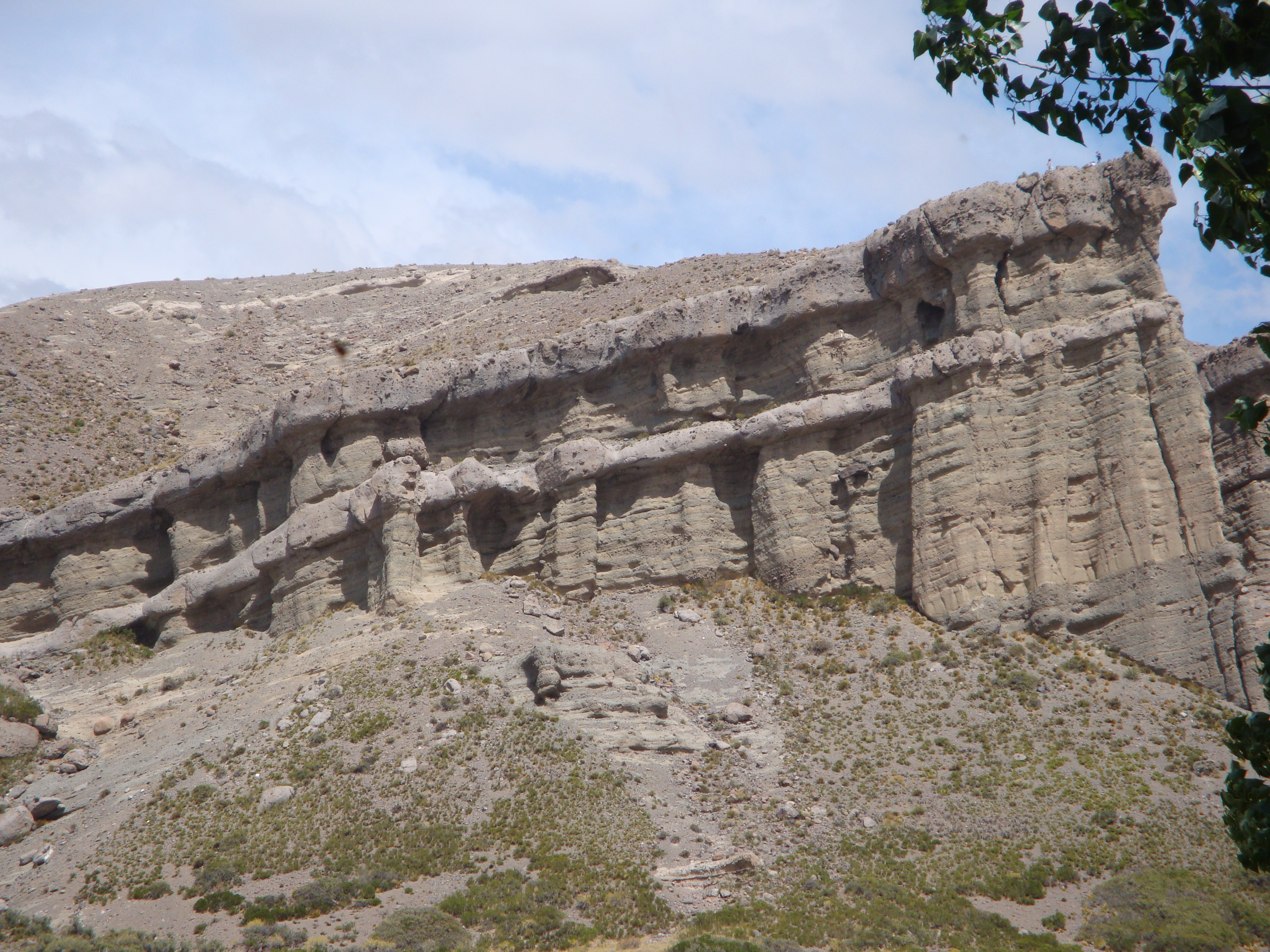
Castillos de Pincheira

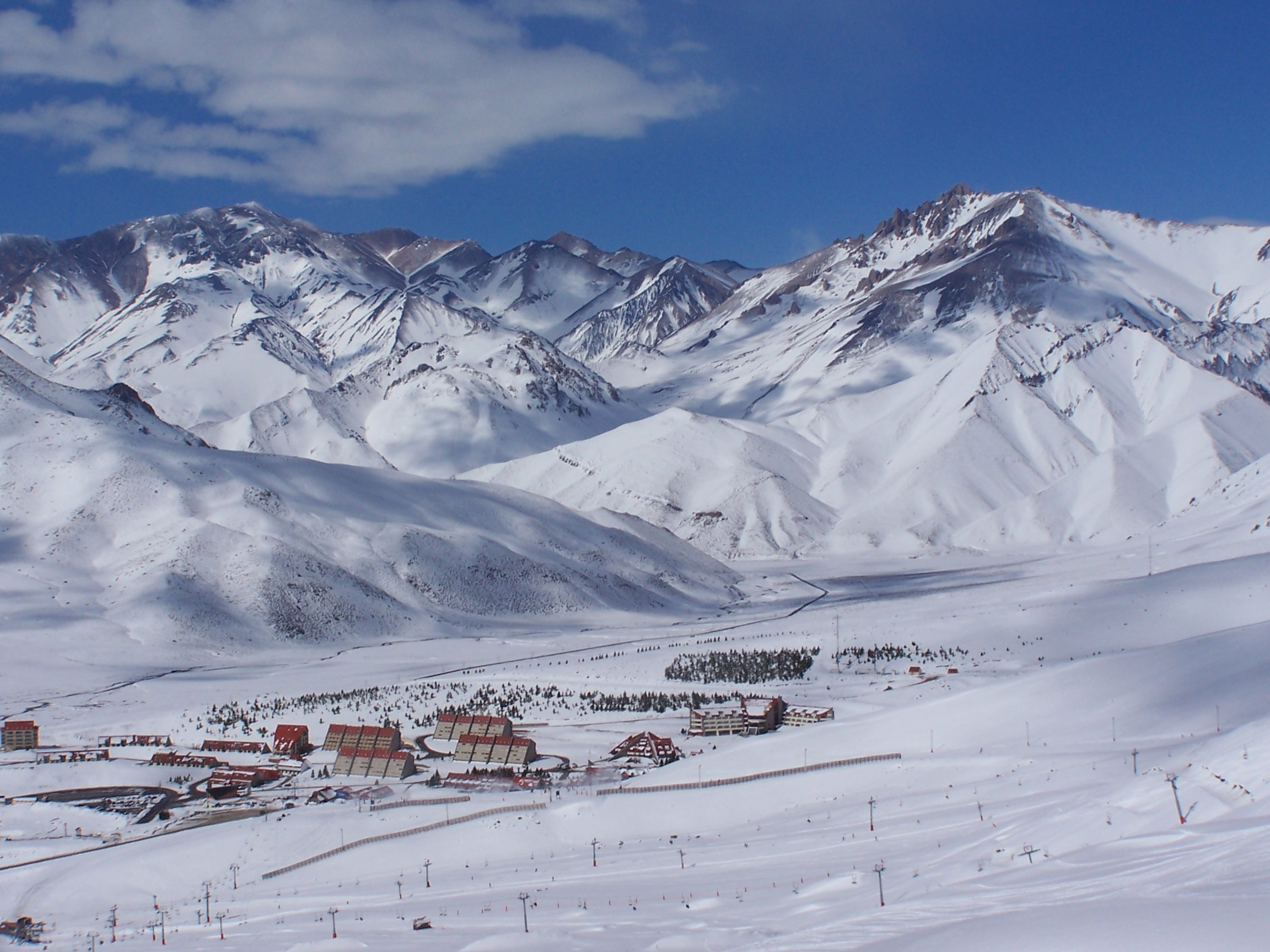
Las Leñas ski resort
