= Río Grande (Mendoza) =

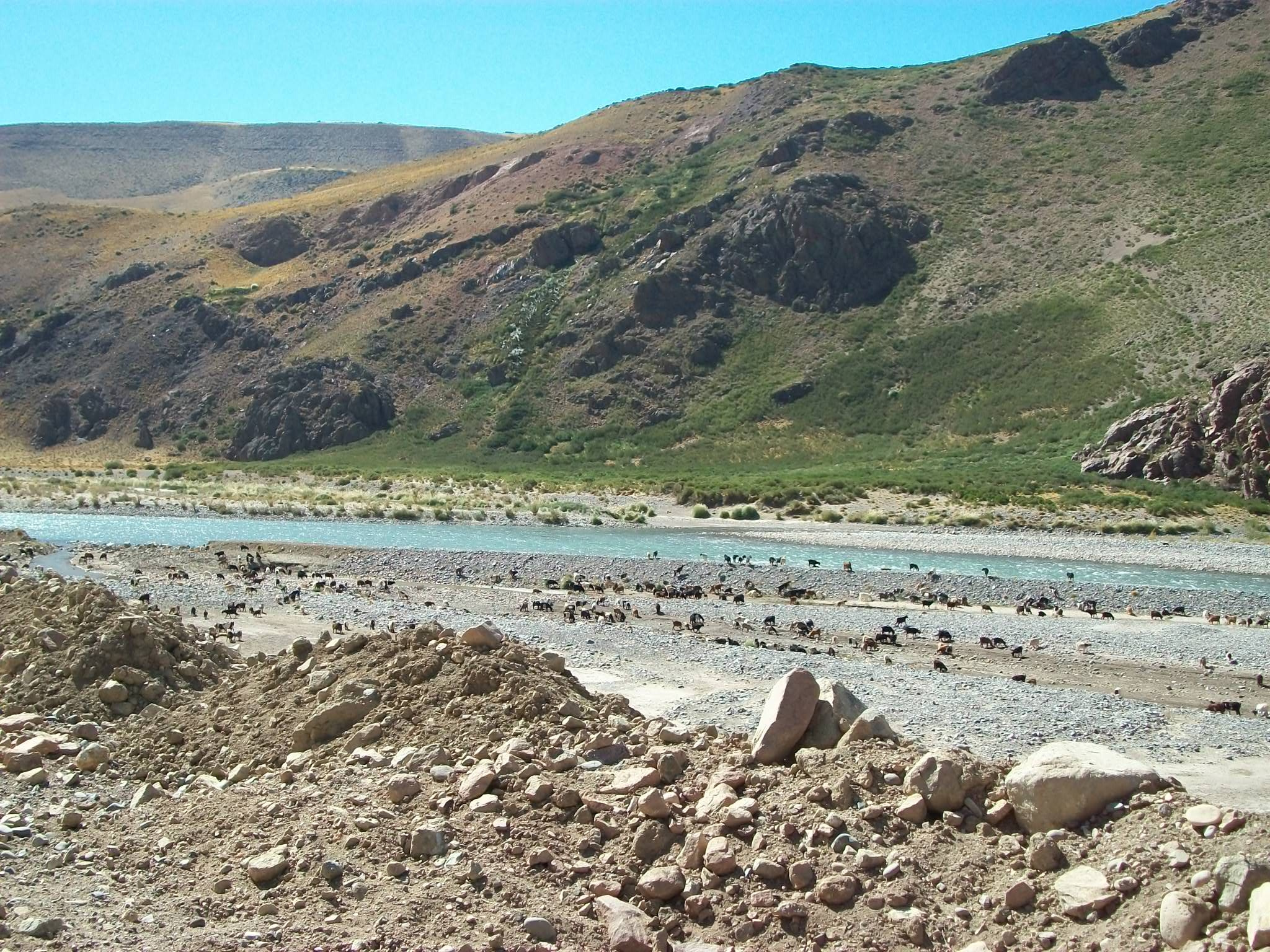
- View of the river from the national route 145

Location
- Country: Argentina
- Province: Mendoza
- Department: Malargüe

Physical characteristics
- Source
  - location: Cobre and Tordillo Rivers, Andes
  - elevation: 4,600 m (15,100 ft) AMSL
- Mouth: Colorado River
  - coordinates: 36°52′19″S 69°45′35″W
- Length: 275 km (171 mi)
- Discharge
  - average: 107 m^{3}/s (3,800 cu ft/s)

Río Grande (Spanish for "great river") is a river located in Malargüe Department of southwestern Mendoza Province, Argentina. It arises in the confluence of the rivers Cobre and Tordillo on the Andes range near Chile and ends at its junction with the Barrancas River to form the Colorado River at the Neuquén Province border. Its total length is 275 kilometres (171 mi). It's the most plentiful river of Mendoza with a flow of 107 m^{3}/s (3,800 cu ft/s).

The river is from 125 km (78 mi) of Malargüe city and its course is development through volcanic rocks cracks. Around exists untouched earth, but the local government plans to take advantage of its resources.

== Tributaries ==
- Right margin:

Cobre River, Santa Elena Stream, De las Cargas Stream, Tiburcio Stream, Valenzuela River, Montañez River, Del Yeso Stream, El Seguro Stream, Los Ángeles Stream, Pichú Trolón Stream, Chico River and Potimalal River

- Left margin:

Tordillo River, De la Pampa Stream, Del Infiernillo Stream, Del Totoral Stream, Carilaufquen Stream, De la Yesera Stream, Chacai-có Stream, Chequenco Stream and Agua Botada Stream
