= Llancanelo Lake =

Lake in Argentina

Coordinates: 35°37′20″S 69°08′33″W

Designations

Ramsar Wetland
- Official name: Laguna de Llancanelo
- Designated: 8 November 1995
- Reference no.: 759

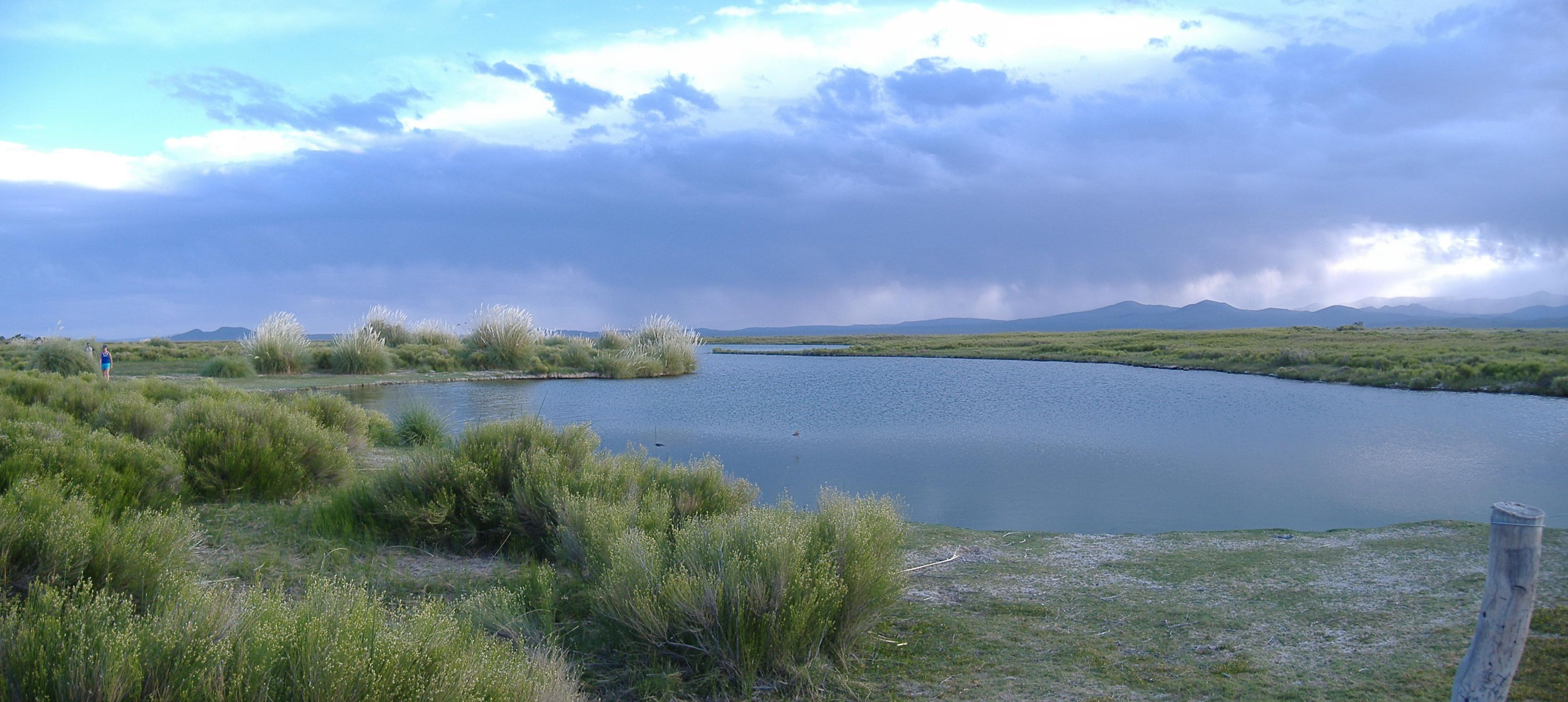
Llancanelo Lake

Llancanelo Lake (Spanish: Laguna de Llancanelo) is a wetland with an area of 650 km^{2}. It is located in the Malargüe Department in the south of Mendoza Province, Argentina, 75 km from the city of Malargüe, at 1,280 m above mean sea level, within the arid region near the Andes in the limit between the regions of Cuyo and Patagonia.

Llancanelo Lake is a provincial nature reserve. It hosts a variety of bird species, including flamingos, black-necked swans, herons and ducks. The lake is also a Ramsar Convention site (RS #759) since 8 November 1995.
