= Malargüe =

- City
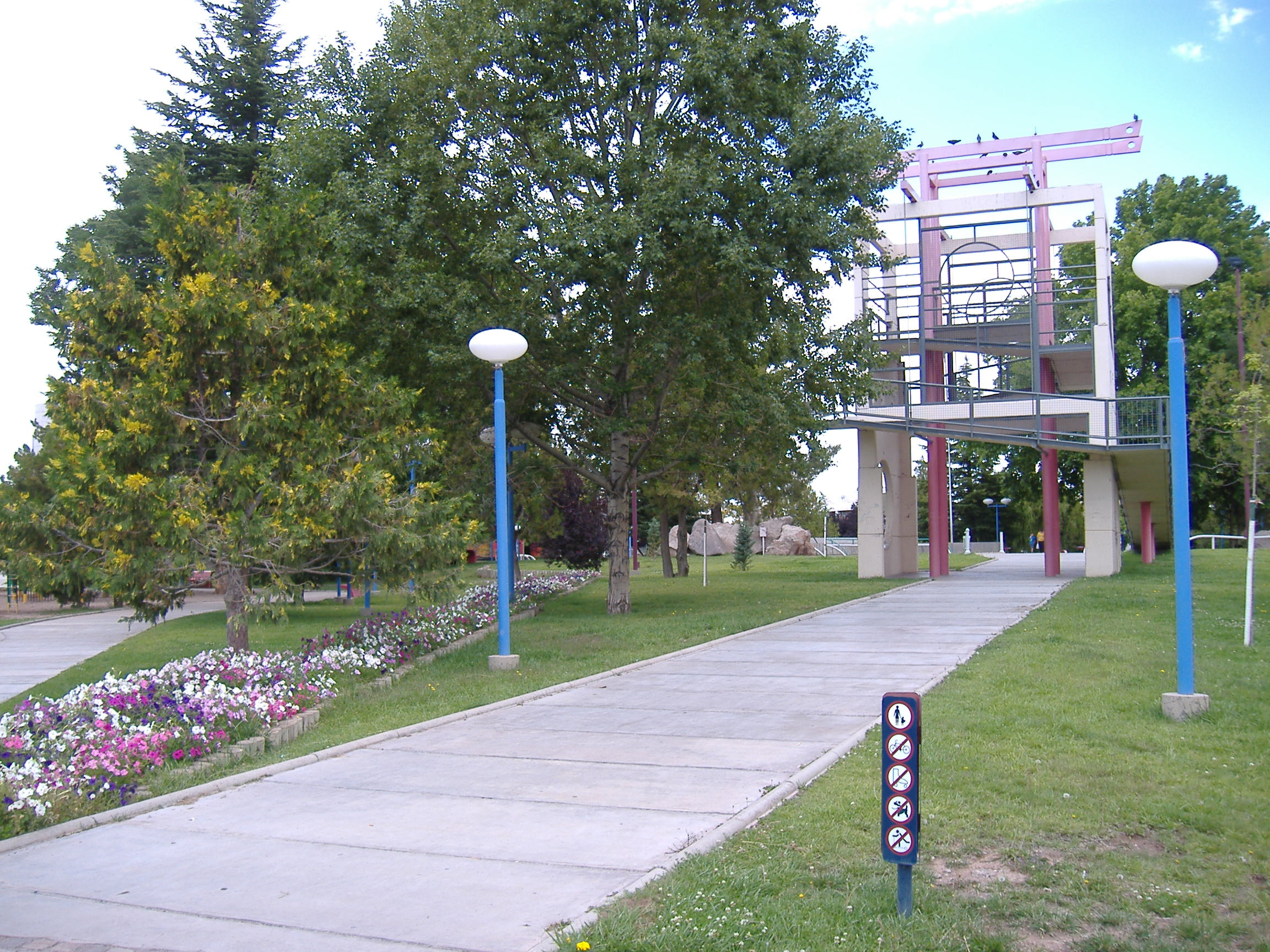
- Plaza San Martin

- Location of Malargüe in Argentina
- Coordinates: 35°28.5′S 69°35′W
- Country: Argentina
- Province: Mendoza
- Department: Malargüe
- Elevation: 1,402 m (4,600 ft)

Population (2010 census)
  - Total: 27,660
- Time zone: UTC−3 (ART)
- CPA base: M5613
- Dialing code: +54 2627
- Climate: BSk

Malargüe (Spanish pronunciation: [maˈlaɾɣwe]) is a city in the southwest part of the province of Mendoza, Argentina, about 370 km south of the provincial capital Mendoza. It is the head town of the Malargüe Department, and it has about 27,000 inhabitants as per the 2010 census [INDEC].

== Etymology ==
The name Malargüe is a rendering of the Mapundungun name Malal Hue, meaning "stone corral" or "place of corrals".

== Overview ==
The city is located in a semi-arid area. Agriculture is focused on the production of seed potato, along with minor crops such as alfalfa, onion and garlic. In the past, the local industries included oil exploration and production (now almost completely deactivated) and uranium mining. As a touristic area, Malargüe provides hotels and cabins for visitors interested in eco-tourism in the summer and skiing in the winter at the nearby resorts of Las Leñas and Los Molles.

The city is known for its traditional dish, the chivito (baby goat). It hosts the annual National Festival of the Goat and the Provincial Festival of the Lamb, during the second week of January.

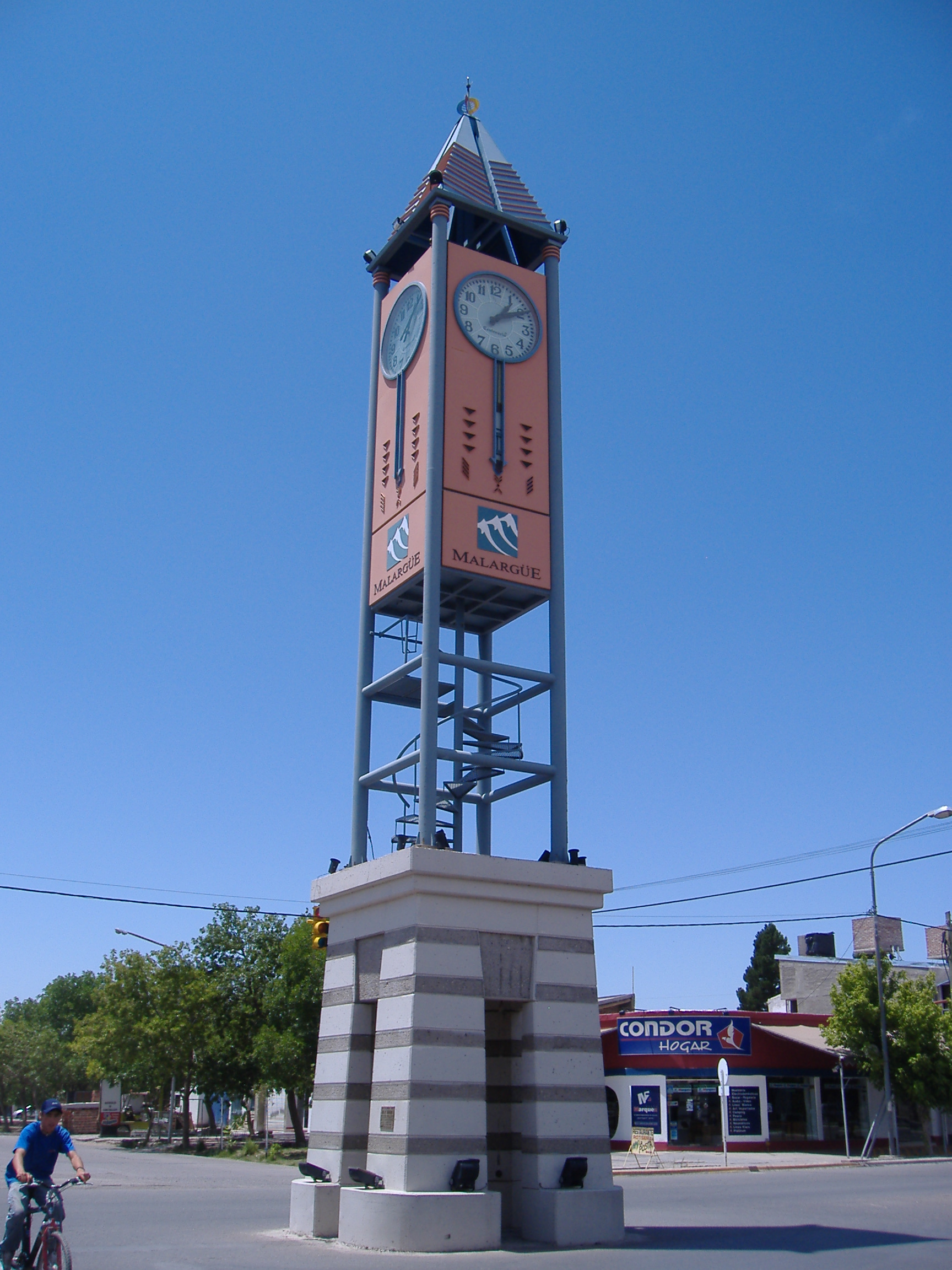
Clock tower in the city center

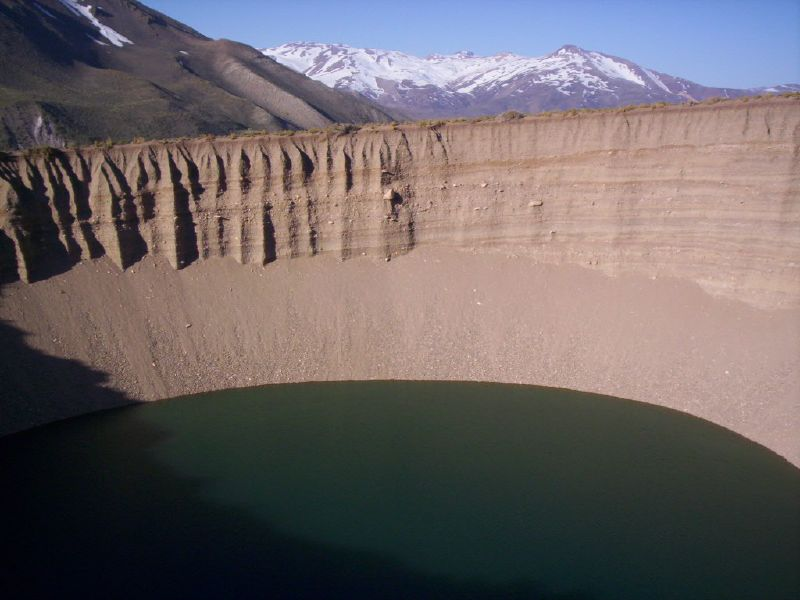
Las Animas well

== History ==
=== 1972 ===
On 13 October 1972 the Uruguayan Air Force Flight 571 crashed in the Andes, in the municipal territory of Malargüe (34°45′54″S 70°17′11″W).

== Climate ==
Malargüe's climate is dry and relatively cold. It is a semi-arid climate under the Köppen climate classification. Summers bring very warm days (the average high is 28 °C (82 °F)) and cool nights (11 °C (52 °F)), with sporadic thunderstorms occurring. By March or early April, frost is to be expected, and during the winter (May to September), wild fluctuations of temperature can occur: the average high is 11 °C (52 °F) and the average low is −2 °C (28 °F), but northwesterly winds that blow downslope from the Andes can bring temperatures of 25 °C (77 °F), and extreme Antarctic outbreaks will bring periods of snow, daytime highs well below 0 °C (32 °F) and night lows well below −12 °C (10 °F).

Climate data for Malargüe, Mendoza, Argentina (1991–2020, extremes 1958–present)
Month	Jan	Feb	Mar	Apr	May	Jun	Jul	Aug	Sep	Oct	Nov	Dec	Year
Record high °C (°F)	36.9 (98.4)	37.0 (98.6)	33.6 (92.5)	30.7 (87.3)	28.6 (83.5)	27.4 (81.3)	28.5 (83.3)	29.4 (84.9)	31.0 (87.8)	33.0 (91.4)	34.0 (93.2)	36.5 (97.7)	37.0 (98.6)
Mean daily maximum °C (°F)	29.1 (84.4)	27.2 (81.0)	25.0 (77.0)	20.0 (68.0)	15.3 (59.5)	12.5 (54.5)	11.8 (53.2)	14.2 (57.6)	17.0 (62.6)	20.5 (68.9)	24.4 (75.9)	27.5 (81.5)	20.4 (68.7)
Daily mean °C (°F)	20.6 (69.1)	18.9 (66.0)	16.4 (61.5)	11.5 (52.7)	7.4 (45.3)	4.7 (40.5)	3.8 (38.8)	5.8 (42.4)	8.7 (47.7)	12.5 (54.5)	16.2 (61.2)	19.2 (66.6)	12.1 (53.8)
Mean daily minimum °C (°F)	11.6 (52.9)	10.7 (51.3)	8.9 (48.0)	4.8 (40.6)	1.5 (34.7)	−1.0 (30.2)	−2.3 (27.9)	−1.1 (30.0)	1.3 (34.3)	4.4 (39.9)	7.3 (45.1)	10.0 (50.0)	4.7 (40.5)
Record low °C (°F)	0.5 (32.9)	−1.3 (29.7)	−6.1 (21.0)	−6.9 (19.6)	−12.0 (10.4)	−18.0 (−0.4)	−24.6 (−12.3)	−15.6 (3.9)	−11.4 (11.5)	−6.4 (20.5)	−3.9 (25.0)	−1.1 (30.0)	−24.6 (−12.3)
Average precipitation mm (inches)	22.7 (0.89)	32.4 (1.28)	30.2 (1.19)	30.4 (1.20)	30.4 (1.20)	33.5 (1.32)	24.4 (0.96)	26.9 (1.06)	17.4 (0.69)	24.5 (0.96)	25.9 (1.02)	21.9 (0.86)	320.6 (12.62)
Average precipitation days (≥ 0.1 mm)	5.3	6.0	4.5	4.0	5.3	5.5	4.2	4.5	4.3	4.4	3.6	4.1	55.7
Average snowy days	0.0	0.0	0.0	0.4	1.2	2.0	2.9	3.2	2.3	0.9	0.1	0.0	12.9
Average relative humidity (%)	43.8	50.3	55.4	60.6	63.7	61.9	59.8	53.7	49.2	44.9	40.9	40.0	52.0
Mean monthly sunshine hours	341.0	279.7	266.6	219.0	179.8	162.0	182.9	210.8	234.0	269.7	312.0	344.1	3,001.6
Mean daily sunshine hours	11.0	9.9	8.6	7.3	5.8	5.4	5.9	6.8	7.8	8.7	10.4	11.1	8.2
Percentage possible sunshine	78.5	70.8	66.5	60.1	57.5	50.6	58.2	59.6	62.2	65.4	72.9	76.5	64.9
Source: Servicio Meteorológico Nacional (percent sun 1991–2000)

== Transport and infrastructures ==
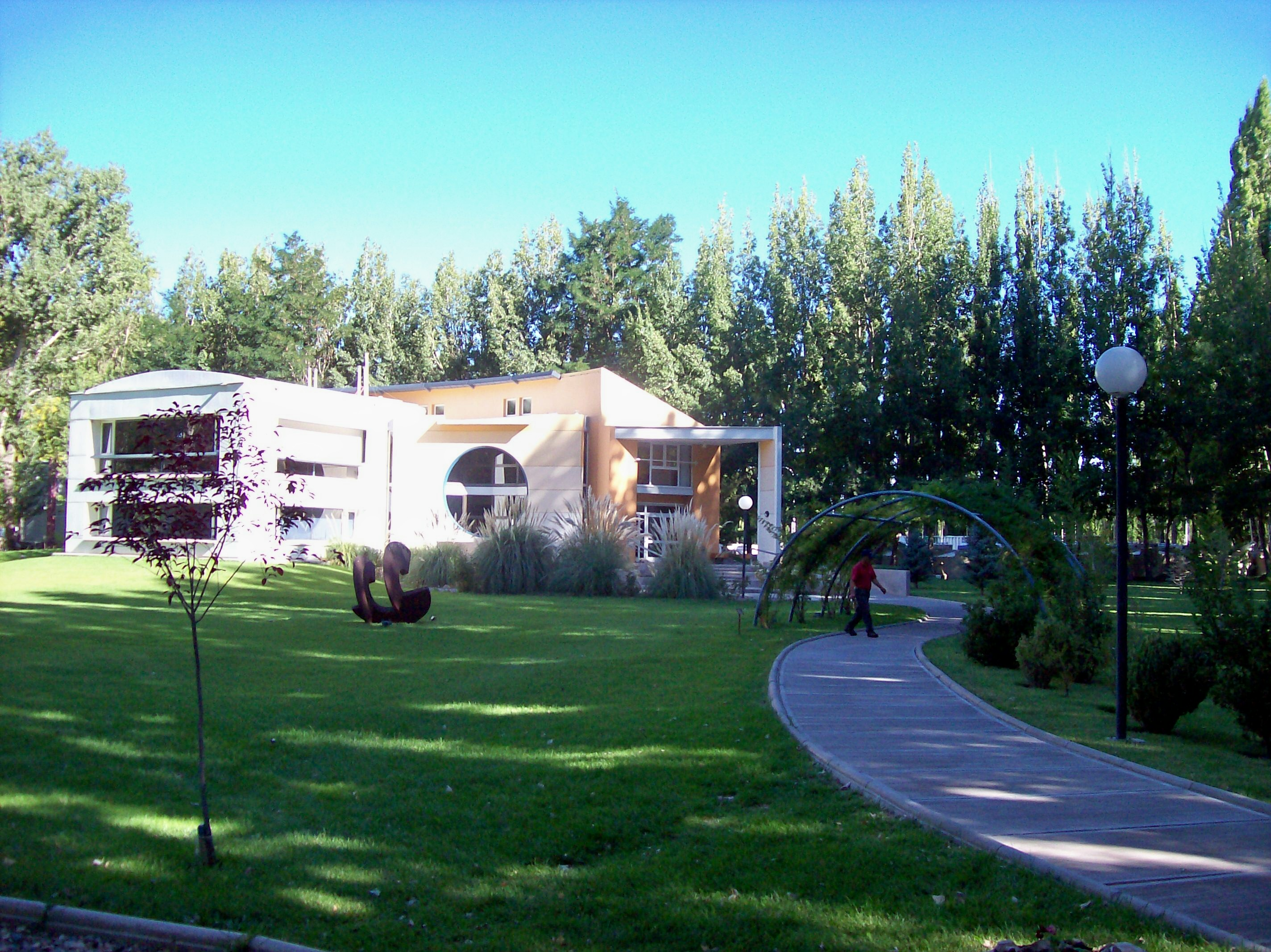
Offices of the Pierre Auger Observatory

=== Transportation ===
Malargüe is linked to the north of Mendoza by National Route 40. This route continues south, entering Neuquén Province, but is only partially built and not well maintained beyond Malargüe City.

Air traffic in the area (only local flights) is served by the Comodoro D. Ricardo Salomón Airport. Aerolíneas Argentinas and American Jet offer services, as of 2021, to this airport.

=== Astronomic and space center ===
Malargüe is also home to the Pierre Auger Observatory, an international physics experiment searching for ultra-high-energy cosmic rays.

The European Space Agency began construction of a deep space ground station 30 km south of Malargüe in 2010. Malargüe Station became operational in early 2013 and is the third 35m dish in its ESTRACK network.
