= Crane World =

- Italian theatrical release poster
- Directed by: Pablo Trapero
- Written by: Pablo Trapero
- Produced by: Lita Stantic; Pablo Trapero
- Starring: Luis Margani; Adriana Aizemberg; Daniel Valenzuela
- Cinematography: Cobi Migliora
- Edited by: Nicolás Goldbart
- Music by: Francisco Canaro
- Distributed by: Cinema Tropical; INCAA; Lita Stantic Producciones
- Release date: June 17, 1999 (Argentina)
- Running time: 90 minutes
- Country: Argentina
- Language: Spanish

Crane World (Spanish: Mundo grúa) is a 1999 Argentine comedy-drama film written and directed by Pablo Trapero. The film was produced by Lita Stantic and Pablo Trapero. It features Luis Margani, Adriana Aizemberg, Daniel Valenzuela, among others.

The movie was partly funded by Argentina's INCAA as well as by the Dutch Hubert Bals Fund.

The picture is about working class life in Argentina that's gritty (filmed in sepia, black and white). The film follows the fortunes in the life of Rulo, an unemployed suburban man, who tries to earn a living as a crane operator in Buenos Aires.

In a survey of the 100 greatest films of Argentine cinema carried out by the Museo del Cine Pablo Ducrós Hicken in 2000, the film reached the 9th position. In a new version of the survey organized in 2022 by the specialized magazines La vida útil, Taipei and La tierra quema, presented at the Mar del Plata International Film Festival, the film reached the 39th position.

== Plot ==
Rulo is the middle-aged ex-bass player of the rock band Seventh Regiment. Unable to make ends meet in the midst of the Argentine great depression, he applies for a job as a crane operator at a construction firm near his residence in Buenos Aires. Rulo takes to the job well, expressing enthusiasm about the peacefulness of his environment despite the precarious heights. The contrast between his rock star past and his current blue-collar lot in life results in him forming unique social bonds. He befriends his trainer, Torres, starts a romantic relationship with sandwich shop owner Adriana, and reminisces about his glory days with his peers and former bandmates. At the same time, Rulo butts heads with his son, Claudio, who plays in a rock band of his own. Rulo is patient with Claudio, lending him money, letting him borrow his old bass guitar for a show, and giving him time to have sex with an audience member he brings home. However, Claudio's slothful and meandering lifestyle between gigs constantly irritates Rulo, who is repeatedly awoken by Claudio's middle-of-the-night arrivals.

Rulo's fortunes take a turn for the worse when he finishes training. On what is supposed to be his first day of work, Rulo finds another co-worker operating the crane, insisting that it's his shift. Rulo takes the matter up with his superior, who reveals that he was dismissed at the insurance company's recommendation. Because of his weight and the health complications that stem from it, he won't receive coverage if he were to officially start work at the firm. Meanwhile, Rulo tells Claudio that the latter's lifestyle has become too much for him to bear. Rulo has his mother take the boy in, and she too quickly comes to chafe against Claudio's poor habits. As consolation for his firing, Torres recommends Rulo to another firm in southern Argentina, where he will work as an excavator; while Rulo worries about being dismissed again because of his health, he takes up the offer, promising a skeptical Adriana that he'll visit and call her every couple of months.

Rulo heads south via train and hitchhiking, quickly befriending his new superior, Sartori. However, it's apparent that the firm is financially struggling: not only do the workers complain about a lack of food, but Rulo's living accommodations are in Sartori's house, which lacks running water. However, Sartori's own deadbeat sons result in Rulo seeing Sartori as a kindred spirit. On the job, Rulo's crane training provides him with enough transferable skills to take well to excavation work, and he immediately starts making progress on a pipeline project. Eventually, however, the firm's dire straits catch up with it, and the project ends up unfinished when the firm shuts down due to bankruptcy. With the whole staff's future now uncertain, Rulo decides to return to Buenos Aires. Calling his mother, who is attempting to teach Claudio to improve his work ethic, Rulo lies to her by claiming that things are going well, but confesses to Claudio that his situation has actually cratered. Parting ways with Sartori, Rulo boards a truck to Buenos Aires, anxious about what lies ahead for him.

== Cast ==
- Luis Margani as Rulo
- Adriana Aizemberg as Adriana
- Daniel Valenzuela as Torres
- Roly Serrano as Walter
- Graciana Chironi as Rulo's mother
- Federico Esquerro as Claudio
- Alejandro Zucco as Zucco
- Alfonso Rementería as Sartori

== Background ==
=== Casting ===
Pablo Trapero, in neo-realist fashion, used extras and bit players when he filmed.

== Distribution ==
The film opened in Argentina on June 17, 1999. Later it was presented at the Toronto International Film Festival on September 17, 1999.

The picture was screened at various film festivals, including: the Sundance Film Festival, Colorado, United States; the International Film Festival Rotterdam, Netherlands; the Fribourg Film Festival, Switzerland; the Buenos Aires International Festival of Independent Cinema, Argentina; the New Directors/New Films Festival, New York City; and others.

== Critical reception ==
Film critic Stephen Holden, film critic for The New York Times, liked the look and tone of the film and wrote, "[the picture] is a stylistic throwback to 1940s Italian neo-realism. The movie's grainy, sepia-toned cinematography and low-key naturalistic performances by a cast of nonprofessionals enhance its slice-of-life authenticity."

Film critic Diego Lerer, a member of FIPRESCI, wrote an extensive essay about director Pablo Trapero's cinema films. He reviewed Mundo grúa favorably and believes Trapero's film is advancing the "New Argentina Cinema Wave" and his films continues to break away from the older Argentine storytelling. He wrote, "Trapero's film dared to break even freer from the classic narrative models. Even though the film has a story, and one that advances with utter efficiency, Crane World respects the characters' internal rhythm like none of the other films by young Argentines had done so far...In Trapero's film, the scenes are developed in all their length."

== Awards ==
=== Wins ===
- Venice Film Festival: 'Cult Network Italia' Prize; Anicaflash Prize; both for Pablo Trapero; 1999.
- Havana Film Festival: Special Jury Prize; Pablo Trapero; 1999.
- Buenos Aires International Festival of Independent Cinema: Best Actor, Luis Margani; Best Director and OCIC Special Award, Pablo Trapero; 1999.
- Fribourg International Film Festival: Don Quixote Award; Ecumenical Jury Award; FIPRESCI Prize, For a first feature film offering a direct and truthful look at a personal strive for a decent life and solidarity; SAA Script Award; all for Pablo Trapero; 2000.
- Argentine Film Critics Association Awards: Silver Condor; Best First Film, Pablo Trapero; Best New Actor, Luis Margani; Best Supporting Actress, Adriana Aizemberg; 2000.
- Rotterdam International Film Festival: FIPRESCI Prize Tiger Competition, Pablo Trapero, For the sober and coherent realism with which it portrays the main character's humanity; Tiger Award, Pablo Trapero; 2000.
- Toulouse Latin America Film Festival: Grand Prix, Pablo Trapero; 2000.

=== Nominations ===
- Valladolid International Film Festival: Golden Spike, Pablo Trapero; 1999.
- Buenos Aires International Festival of Independent Cinema: Best Film, Pablo Trapero; 1999.
- Argentine Film Critics Association Awards: Silver Condor, Best Director, Pablo Trapero; Best Film; Best Original Screenplay, Pablo Trapero; 2000.
- Goya Awards: Goya, Best Spanish Language Foreign Film, Pablo Trapero, Argentina; 2000.
