= Enrique Liporace =

Argentine actor (1941–2024)

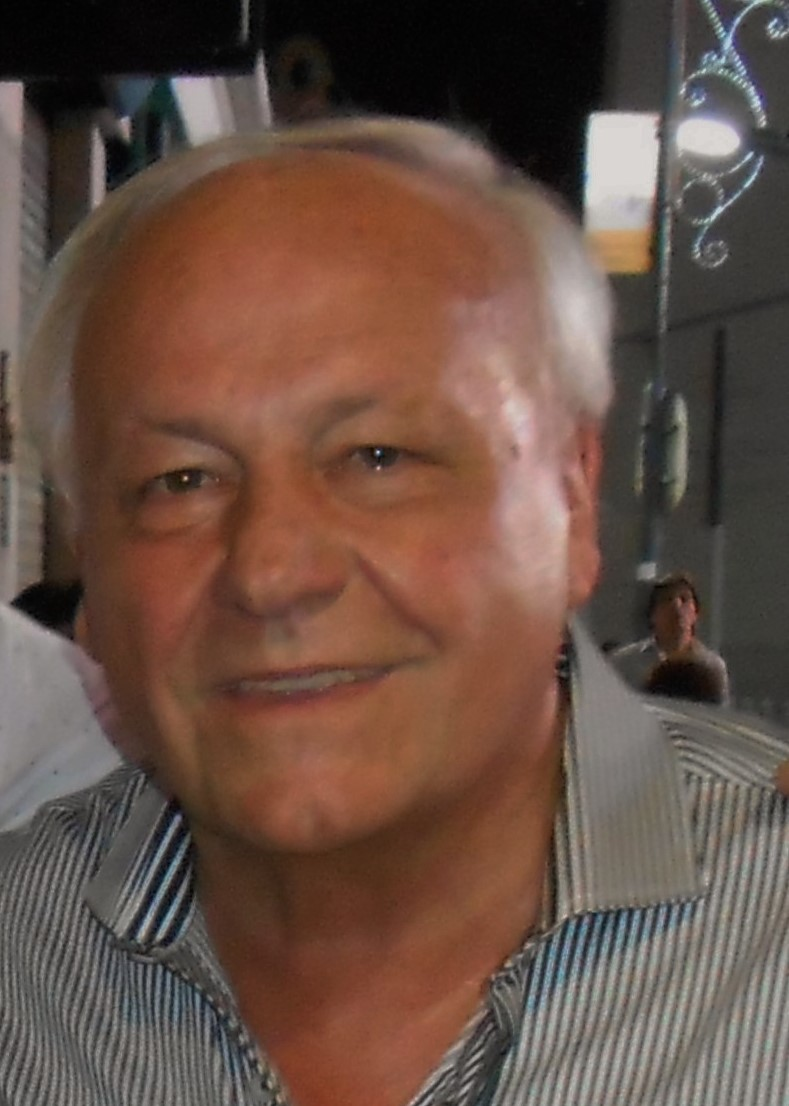
- Born: 10 June 1941
- Died: 27 January 2024 (aged 82)
- Years active: 1963–2024

Enrique Liporace (10 June 1941 – 27 January 2024) was an Argentine actor.

== Life and work ==
Liporace began his career as an actor in 1963, when he was cast in La terraza, directed by period piece filmmaker Leopoldo Torre Nilsson. He earned extensive credits as a supporting actor in Argentine cinema, television and theatre in subsequent years, working with leading local directors such as Luis Saslavsky, Hugo del Carril, Lucas Demare, and Manuel Antín. Liporace shared an ill-fated relationship with actress Soledad Silveyra during the late 1960s, though the couple never married.

Liporace's role as Basile, the compromised mining engineer in Adolfo Aristarain's Tiempo de revancha (1981) would become one of his best-known, and the following year, he starred in Aristarain's thriller, Últimos días de la víctima. He also returned to the theatre, and acted in Al vencedor, a military drama by Osvaldo Dragún, during the Argentine Open Theatre festival of the early 1980s.

The versatile actor played a transvestite man immersed in intrigue in Hebert Posse Amorim's 1985 critique of corporate control over broadcasting in Sin querer, queriendo (Accidentally on Purpose). A series of less notable roles followed, though Liporace remained busy in film and theatre alike. He appeared as populist President Juan Perón's calculating Information Minister, Raúl Apold, in Juan Carlos Desanzo's Eva Perón (1996), and as the gruff, corner café proprietor given to hiring illegal immigrants in Bolivia (2001).

Liporace's later roles include that of a nostalgic, minor-party politician in Fernando Musa's Chiche bombón (2004), and of a reprise of his earlier role as a transvestite in Daniel Ritto's Plástico cruel (2005). These roles never brought the recognition Lioprace sought, however, and the aging actor instead found success in the theatre, when in 2009 he was cast in Hernán Casciari's play, Más respeto que soy tu madre (More Respect - I'm Your Mother). The play, a slice-of-life tale set during the 1998–2002 Argentine great depression of 2002, cast Liporace opposite famed female impersonator Antonio Gasalla as the Bertottis, and drew a combined audience of half a million in its first 540 shows in Buenos Aires.

Liporace died on 27 January 2024, at the age of 82.

== Selected filmography and theatre roles ==
Film
Year	Title	Role	Director
2009	Franzie	Emanuel	Alejandra Marino
2007	La soledad	Enrique	Maximiliano González
2005	Plástico cruel	Bombón	Daniel Ritto
2004	Chiche bombón	Manrique	Fernando Musa
2002	Un oso rojo	Güemes	Israel Adrián Caetano
2001	Bolivia	Enrique	Israel Adrián Caetano
1997	Martín (hache)	Migue	Adolfo Aristarain
1996	Eva Perón	Raúl Apold	Juan Carlos Desanzo
1985	Sin querer, queriendo	Lily	Hebert Posse Amorim
1982	Últimos días de la víctima	Peña	Adolfo Aristarain
1981	Tiempo de Revancha	Basile	Adolfo Aristarain

Television
Year	Title	Role	Notes
2006	Amas de casa desesperadas		
2005	Mujeres asesinas	Miguel	
2003	Resistiré	Aníbal Gamboa	
1989	Discepolín		
1968	Teatro como en el teatro		

Theatre
Year	Title	Role	Playwright
2009 — 11	Más respeto que soy tu madre	Zacarías Bertotti	Hernán Casciari
2008	Les Femmes Savantes	Vadius	Molière
1982	Al vencedor	Federico Hurtado	Osvaldo Dragún
