= Lita Stantic =

Argentine producer, screenwriter, and director (born 1942)

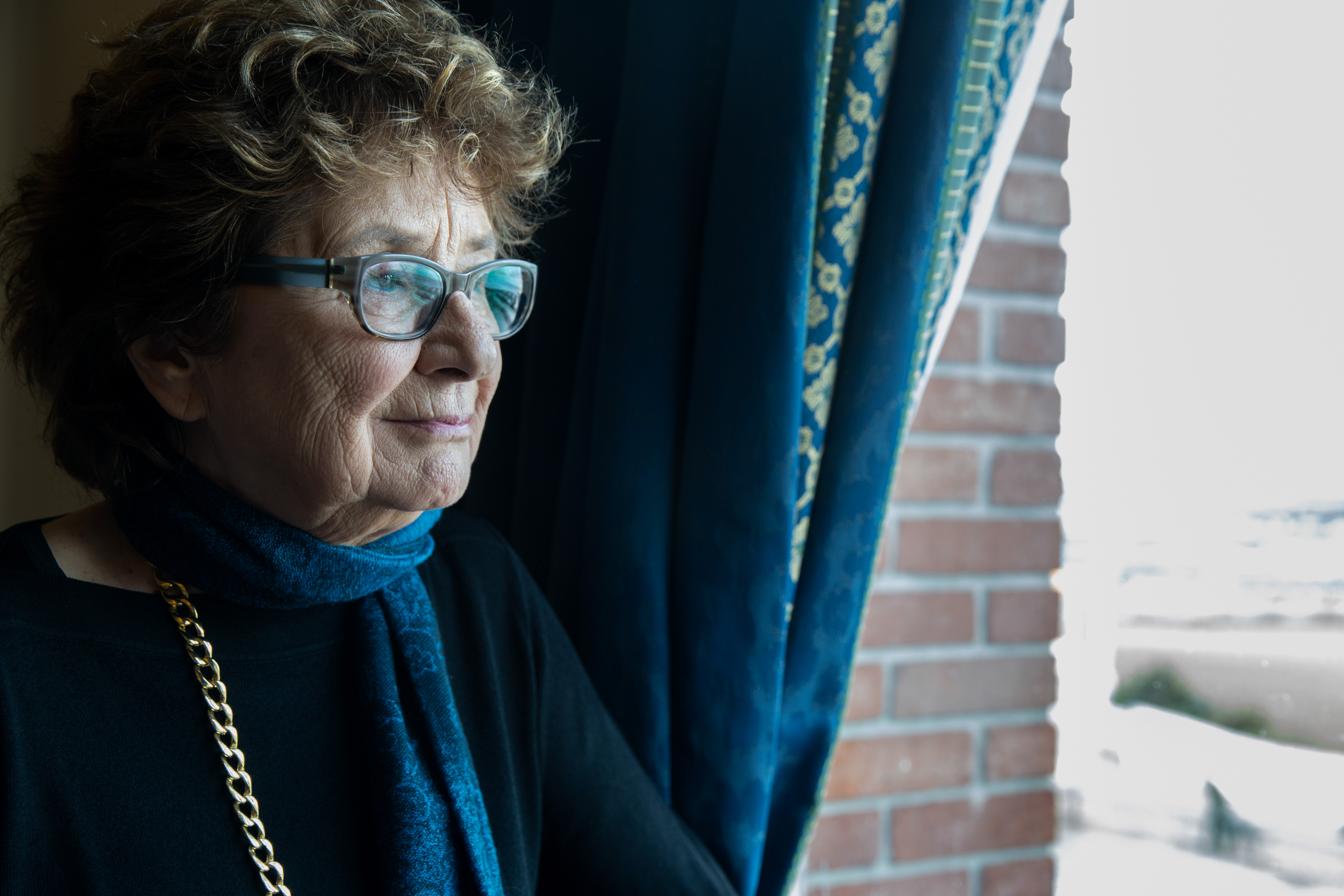
Lita Stantic (2022)

Élida Stantic (born 7 April 1942), more commonly known and credited as Lita Stantic, is an Argentine producer, screenwriter, and director.

Stantic is one of the most important producers working in the "New Argentine Cinema," responsible for the debut films of some of the most critically well regarded new Argentine filmmakers such as Lucrecia Martel, Pablo Trapero, and Israel Adrián Caetano.

== Biography ==
She has been working in the Argentine cinema since she was hired as an assistant director for the film Diario de campamento (1965).

Stantic then began making short films in the mid 1960s, but then changed her focus to advertising.

She remained active in Argentine cinema via the "Cine Liberacion," an underground production and distribution collective that secretly showed films that would have otherwise been banned in Argentina by the military government.

During the politically tumultuous 1970s in Argentina, Stantic worked on over a dozen films including Alejandro Doria's La isla (1978), which was the first Argentine film to be a box-office hit during the dictatorship.

During the 1980s she established the production company GEA Cinematografica together with Maria Luisa Bemberg. Later she was the founder of Lita Stantic Productions.

When the "New Argentine Cinema" began in the late 1990s, she has produced films which have been critically widely acclaimed. Films such as A Red Bear, La Ciénaga, Bolivia, The Holy Girl and others.

== Producer filmography (partial) ==
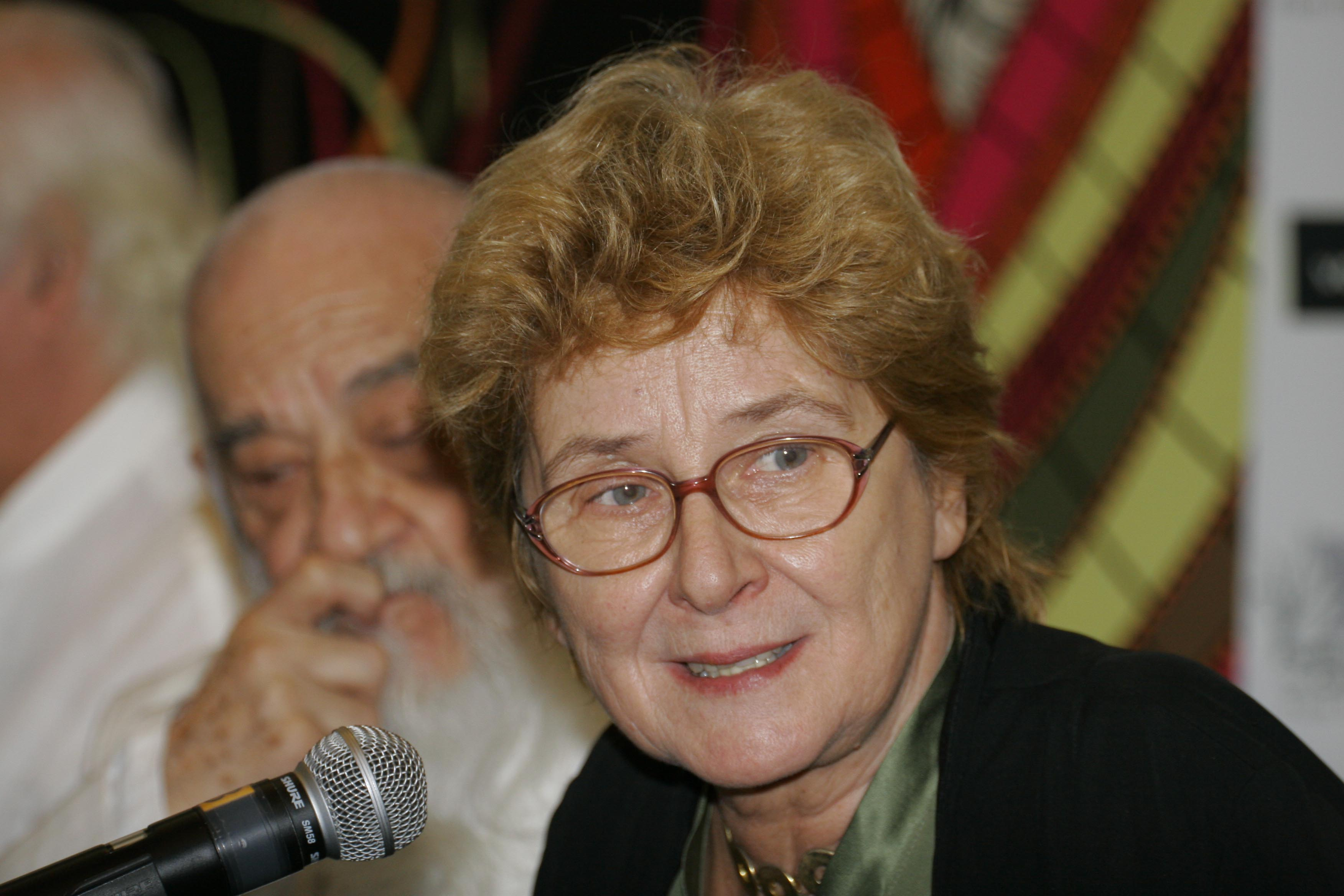
Lita Stantic (2008)

- El Verano del potro (1991) a.k.a. Summer of the Colt
- Un Muro de Silencio (1993) a.k.a. A Wall of Silence
- Dársena sur (1998)
- Mundo Grúa (1999) a.k.a. Crane World
- Bolivia (2001)
- La Ciénaga (2001) a.k.a. The Swamp
- Un Oso Rojo (2002) a.k.a. A Red Bear
- Tan de repente (2002) a.k.a. Suddenly
- Hamaca paraguaya (2006) aka Paraguayan Hammock
- La Niña Santa (2004) a.k.a. The Holy Girl

== Producer television (partial) ==
- Sol de otoño (1996) a.k.a. Autumn Sun
- Historias de vidas, Encarnación Ezcurra (1998)
- Historias de vidas, Silvina Ocampo (1998)

== Awards ==
Wins

- Havana Film Festival: Special Mention; for Tan de repente, 2002 and Un Oso Rojo, 2002.
- Locarno International Film Festival: Silver Leopard; for Tan de repente, 2002.
- Prince Claus Award, 2003
- Locarno International Film Festival: Raimondo Rezzonico Prize for the best independent producer, 2007
