= MTV Movie Awards Mexico 2002 =

The MTV Movie Awards Mexico 2002 was hosted by Regina Orozco.

== Winners and Nominees ==
=== Favorite Movie - México ===
- Corazones rotos
- De la calle
- Nadie te oye: Perfume de violetas
- Piedras verdes
- Y Tu Mamá También

=== Favorite Movie - Chile ===
- El Leyton
- La Fiebre del Loco
- Taxi para tres
- Te Amo, Made in Chile
- Un Ladron y su Mujer

=== Favorite Movie - Argentina ===
- Déjala correr
- El Descanso
- La Ciénaga
- La Fuga
- Sólo por hoy

=== Best Song from a Movie ===
- "Acaríciame" — Julieta Venegas (Demasiado amor)
- "De La Calle" — Ely Guerra (De la calle)
- "Déjame Si Estoy Llorando" — El Gran Silencio (Piedras verdes)
- "Here Comes The Mayo" — Molotov (Y Tu Mamá También)
- "Olvidemos El Romance (Cojamos Ya)" — Lost Acapulco (Nadie te oye: Perfume de violetas)

=== Best Mexican Talent Drain Abroad ===
- Carlos Bolado - Promises (co-director)
- Emmanuel Lubezki - Ali (cinematographer)
- Guillermo del Toro - El Espinazo Del Diablo (director)
- Guillermo del Toro - Blade II (director)
- Salma Hayek - Hotel (actress)

=== Best Kiss ===
- Diego Luna and Maribel Verdú - Y Tu Mamá También
- Gael García Bernal and Diego Luna - Y Tu Mamá También
- Gael García Bernal and Maribel Verdú - Y Tu Mamá También
- Luis Fernando Peña and Maya Zapata - De la calle
- Pablo Delgado and Ximena Ayala - Nadie te oye: Perfume de violetas

=== Best Insult ===
- Diego Luna and Gael García Bernal - Y Tu Mamá También
- Gabriela Canudas - Demasiado amor
- Marta Navarro - Corazones rotos
- Ximena Ayala - Nadie te oye: Perfume de violetas

=== Sexiest Woman ===
- Bárbara Mori - Inspiración
- Claudia Ramírez - De la calle
- Lorena Rojas - Corazones rotos
- Maribel Verdú - Y Tu Mamá También
- Salma Hayek - Y Tu Mamá También

=== Baddest Mon ===
- Ana Martín - Corazones rotos
- Arcelia Ramírez - Nadie te oye: Perfume de violetas
- Diana Bracho - Y Tu Mamá También
- Luis Felipe Tovar - De la calle
- María Rojo - Nadie te oye: Perfume de violetas
