= Marcos Martínez =

Marcos Martínez may refer to:

- Marcos Martínez (racing driver)
- Marcos Martínez (actor)
