= List of Argentine films of 2004 =

A list of films produced in Argentina in 2004:

== 2004 ==
Title	Director	Actors	Genre	Notability
El abrazo partido	Daniel Burman	Daniel Hendler	Comedy	
Adiós querida luna	Fernando Spiner	Gabriel Goity	Comedy	Alejandro Urdapilleta won Best Actor and 1 nom.
Ay Juancito	Héctor Olivera	Leticia Brédice	Biography	
Buena vida delivery	Leonardo Di Cesare			
Buenos Aires 100 kilómetros	Pablo José Meza			
Chiche bombón	Fernando Musa			
Cama adentro	Jorge Gaggero			
Conversations with Mother	Santiago Carlos Oves			Entered into the 26th Moscow International Film Festival
Deuda	Jorge Lanata & Andrés G. Schaer			
Diarios de Motocicleta	Walter Salles	Gael García Bernal, Rodrigo de la Serna, Mercedes Morán		Entered into the 2004 Cannes Film Festival
Familia rodante	Pablo Trapero			
The Holy Girl	Lucrecia Martel			Entered into the 2004 Cannes Film Festival
No sos vos, soy yo	Juan Taratuto			
Patoruzito	José Luis Massa			
Whisky	Juan Pablo Rebella & Pablo Stoll			Screened at the 2004 Cannes Film Festival
Whisky Romeo Zulu	Enrique Piñeyro			
Erreway: 4 caminos	Ezequiel Crupnicoff	Luisana Lopilato, Camila Bordonaba, Benjamín Rojas, Felipe Colombo		
18-j	Various			Collection of short films

== See also ==
- 2004 in Argentina

== External links and references ==
- Argentine films of 2004 at the Internet Movie Database
