= Micaela Vázquez =

Argentine actress, singer and model

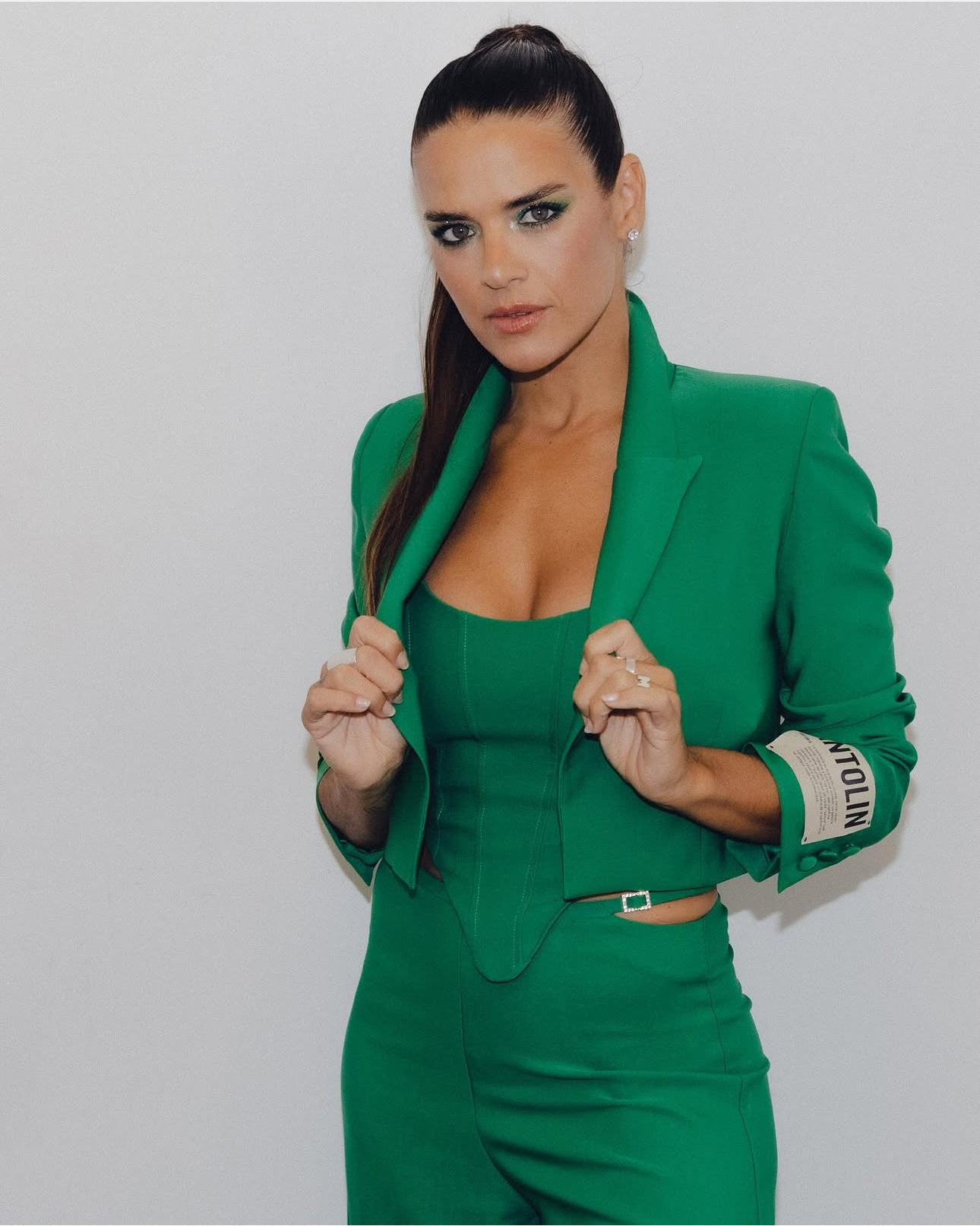
- Born: Micaela Belén Vázquez; November 24, 1986 (age 39); Buenos Aires, Argentina
- Occupations: Actress and Television presenter
- Years active: 2001-present
- Spouse: Federico Larroca (m. 2017; div. 2019)
- Partner(s): Fernando Gago (2007-2010); Gerónimo Klein (2019-present)
- Children: Baltazar Klein (b. 2020)

Micaela Belén Vázquez (born November 24, 1986) is an Argentine actress and television presenter. She is best known for her role of Pilar Dunoff in the series Rebelde Way, and for the series Chiquititas and Floricienta.

== Career ==
Vázquez was ten when she received the role of Miki in the television hit series for children and teenagers, Chiquititas. Vázquez reprised her role in the 2001 mini–series Chiquititas. Her most famous role is Pilar Dunoff in Rebelde Way, co-starring Benjamin Rojas, Luisana Lopilato, Felipe Colombo and Camila Bordonaba. Vázquez portrayed Pilar from 2002 to 2003. She was singing the back vocals at the two tours of Rebelde Way musical group, pop rock sensation Erreway, Erreway en Grand Rex and Nuestro Tiempo. Vázquez further appeared in Erreway's videos "Sweet Baby", "Resistiré", "Tiempo" and "Para Cosas Buenas".

In 2004, Vázquez appeared as Renata in the television series Floricienta, co-starring Benjamin Rojas, Florencia Bertotti, Juan Gil Navarro and Isabel Macedo. In 2006, she appeared in the film Crónica de una fuga. Vázquez had guest appearances in television series such as Casados con Hijos (2005), Sos mi vida (2006), Chiquititas 2006 (2006) and Son de Fierro (2007).

== Personal life ==
Vázquez stated that her favorite sports are handball and football; and supports football club Boca Juniors.

From 2007 to 2010, she dated Real Madrid CF player Fernando Gago,. In 2009, it was reported that Vázquez was involved with another Real Madrid CF Argentine player, Gonzalo Higuaín,

On 15 November 2017, she married Federico Larroca in a civil ceremony and on 18 November 2017 in a religious ceremony. The couple divorced on November 18, 2019.

== Filmography ==
=== Television ===
Year	Title	Character	Channel
2001	Chiquititas	Micaela "Micki"	Telefe
2002-2003	Rebelde Way	Pilar Dunoff	Canal 9/América TV
2004	Floricienta	Renata	Canal 13
2005	Casados con Hijos	Valeria	Telefe
2006	Chiquititas	Rita	Telefe
2006	El tiempo no para	Sofía	Canal 9
2006	Sos mi vida	Micaela Oroño	Canal 13
2007	Son de Fierro	Clara Loma	Canal 13
2011	Los únicos	Katy	Canal 13
2012-2013	Dulce Amor	Florencia Guerrero	Telefe
2013-2014	Taxxi, amores cruzados	Emma Linares	Telefe
2014	Yo soy virgen	Macarena	
2015-2016	La casa del mar	Sabrina	OnDirecTV
2017	Cartoneros	Elena Fuentes	Canal 9
2017	Tipo que na en común	La Jessi	FWTV
2018-2019	Mi hermano es un clon	Romina Paz	Canal 13
2019	Pequeña Victoria	Gala	Telefe

=== Theater ===
Year	Title	Character	Director	Theater
2001	Chiquititas	Micaela "Micki"	Cris Morena	Teatro Gran Rex
2002	Rebelde Way	Pilar Dunoff	Cris Morena	Teatro Gran Rex
2002-2004	Erreway	Herself	Cris Morena	
2004-2005	Floricienta	Renata	Cris Morena	Teatro Gran Rex
2006	Dulce Reino			Teatro La campana
2006	Floricienta, el tour de los sueños	Renata	Cris Morena	
2007	Floricienta, el tour de los sueños en México	Renata	Cris Morena	
2010	Remisería		Pablo Drigo	Teatro El cubo
2011	Marejada		Diego Beares	Teatro Piccolino
2012-2013	Next		Mariano Bicain and Erika Halvorsen	Teatro Ofelia and Teatro Piccolino
2013	Los Grimaldi		Nazarena Vélez	Multiteatro
2016	Separados			
2016	El club del chamuyo, el musical		Ezequiel Sagasti	Metropolitan City

=== Movies ===
Year	Movie	Character	Director
2006	Crónica de una fuga	Claudio's sister	Israel Adrián Caetano
2009	Mafiosos españoles	Estela	
2013	Chicos católicos	Carmen	Israel Adrián Caetano

=== Television Programs ===
Year	Program	Channel	Notes
2009-2010	Call TV	40 Latino	Host
2013-2018	Fans en Vivo	FWTV	Host
2018	TNT play sports	TNT Sports	Host
2019	Agenda Fox Sports	Fox Sports	Penalist

== Discography ==
=== Soundtrack albums ===
- 2001—Chiquititas Vol. 7
- 2004—Floricienta
