= Andrea Galante =

Argentine actress

- Born: September 2, 1982 (age 42); Buenos Aires, Argentina
- Years active: 2000–present

Andrea Galante (born September 2, 1982) is an Argentine actress, primarily in television and film.

== Early life and education ==
Galante was born in Buenos Aires. She graduated from the Argentine National Institute of Cinematic Arts (ENERC).

== Career ==
Galante usually appears in romantic dramas. She has appeared on-stage in Espumantes and two segments of La noticia del día. She made her on-screen debut in 1995 as a child actress in the telenovela Amigovios, as María Sol. She has since appeared in other telenovelas such as Franco Buenaventura, el profe in 2002, El Deseo in 2004, and Hombres de honor in 2005, and in 2006 in the drama series mujeres asesinas.

Her film début was in Chiche bombón (2004), as a failed pregnant actress; she has since appeared in the shorts Esas noches de insomnio (2005) and Aminga, de un pueblo à la ciudad (2007), and Paco (2009). She starred in Cuando ella saltó (2007) opposite Argentine model and actor Iván de Pineda. She also co-stars in Claudio Bertel's upcoming Engaño.

== Filmography ==
- Amigovios (1995) TV series as María Sol
- Franco Buenaventura, el profe (2002) TV series as Paula Libonati
- El Deseo (2004) TV series as Coral
- Chiche bombón (2004) as Chiche
- Esas noches de insomnio as (2005) as Violeta
- Hombres de honor (2005) TV series as Bella de Brusca
- mujeres asesinas (2006) TV series
- Aminga, de un pueblo à la ciudad (2007)
- Cuando ella saltó (2007) as Angela/Lila
- Miss Argentina (2008)
- Paco (pre-production)
- Engaño (pre-production) as Bernabela
