= Mansión Seré =

Coordinates: 34°39′32.5″S 58°39′35.6″W

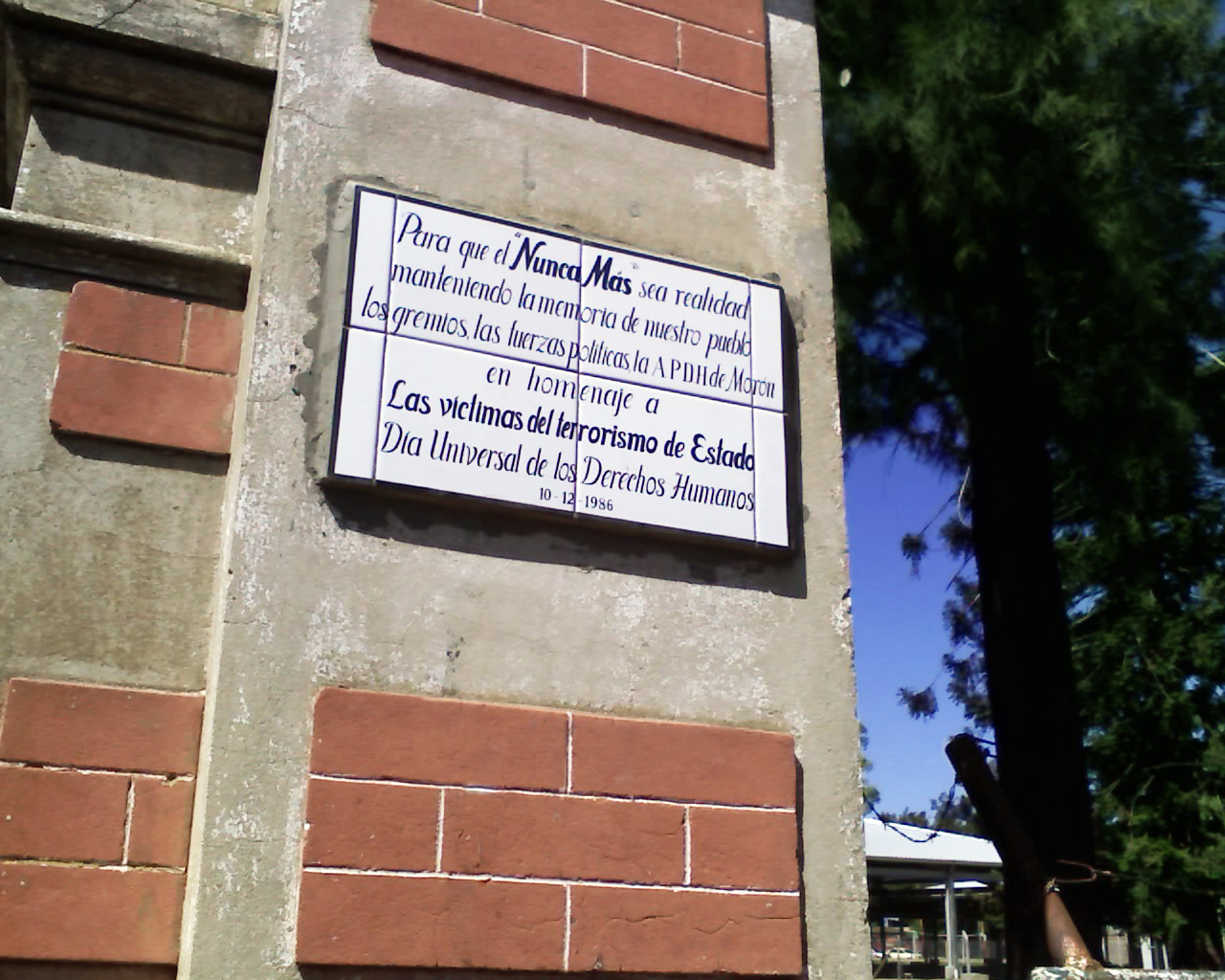
Commemorative plaque and first signage of Mansión Seré, approved unanimously by the Deliberative Council. "So that the Nunca Más is a reality, keeping the memory of our people, the unions, the political forces, the APDH of Morón in homage to the Victims of State Terrorism. Universal Day of Human Rights, 10 December 1986."

The Mansión Seré (also known as Quinta de Seré and Atila) was a clandestine detention center (CCD) run by the Argentine Air Force during the self-styled National Reorganization Process (1976–1983).

== History ==
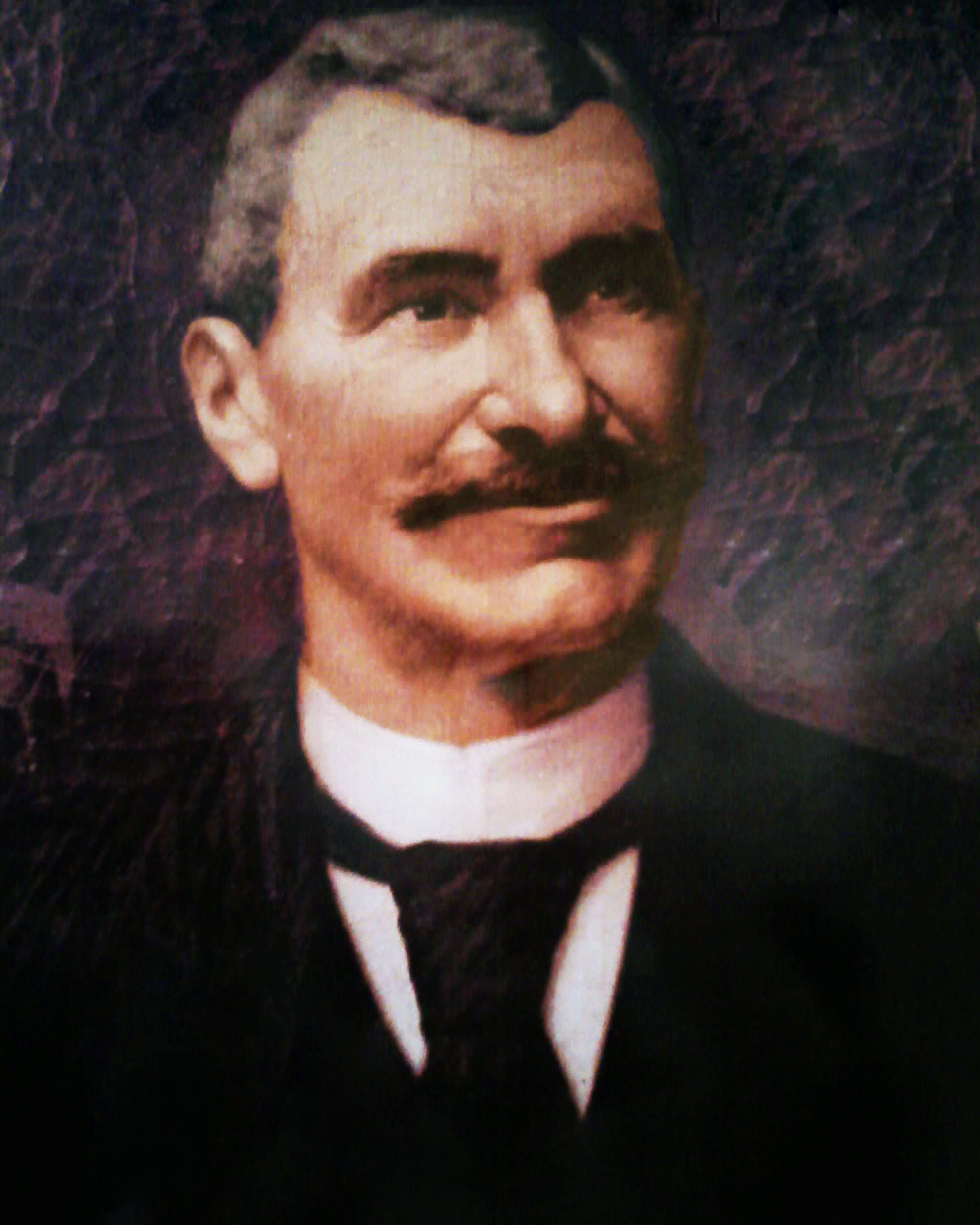
Jean Sère (1831–1893)

Mansión Seré was an old house located on Blas Parera Street on the border between the towns of Castelar and Ituzaingó, Partido de Morón, Buenos Aires Province.

In 1868, the French Basque immigrant Jean Sère acquired 56 hectares in the outskirts of Morón. There he built the Quinta Seré, where he dedicated himself to the breeding of polo horses and livestock. When Seré died in 1893, the lands were divided among three of his children. In 1900, his daughter Leocadia, heir to the plot adjoining Ituzaingó, and her husband Santiago Capdepont commissioned the architect Juan Bernardo Seré, brother of Leocadia, to build the Mansión, a French-style manor on two floors with materials imported from Europe. The beauty of the building was enhanced by the rural landscape that surrounded it.

In 1928, Leocadia acquired 11 hectares of adjoining land. During those years, the first subdivisions were made, giving rise to Barrio Seré.

For reasons not established, the mansion was sold to the Municipality of the City of Buenos Aires in 1949, for a sum close to three million pesos (called "national currency pesos"). After the fall of Juan Perón, the property was virtually abandoned until 1966.

During the de facto presidency of Juan Carlos Onganía in 1966, the building was repurposed as the officers' mess of the 7th Air Brigade of Morón, thus beginning the military's presence in the area. After the coup of 1976, from 1977 to 1978, the site functioned as a clandestine detention center under the jurisdiction of the Air Force, with assistance from the Buenos Aires Police of Castelar. In the jargon of the repressors it was known as "Atila" or "La Mansión".

Despite the strict controls and surveillance to which the prisoners housed in the mansion were subjected, an escape was possible, and with it came the beginning of the end for this clandestine detention center. On 24 March 1978, coinciding with the second anniversary of the military coup, footballer Claudio Tamburrini, Daniel Rusomano, Guillermo Fernández, and Carlos García Muñoz managed to sneak out by lowering themselves naked and handcuffed from a window on the first floor. These events are recreated in the 2006 film Chronicle of an Escape by director Adrián Caetano.

After the escape, the military authorities decided to destroy the building to hide evidence of human rights abuses that had occurred there. The mansion was set on fire and dynamited, leaving only an unstable façade, and the prisoners were sent to various penal units. In 1985, soon after the restoration of democracy, Morón mayor Norberto García Silva oversaw the recovery of the property through a ten-year loan from the Municipality of Buenos Aires to the Municipality of Morón, to be assigned to the construction of a sports center called "Gorki Grana". On the day of the inauguration, the mayor affirmed: "Where there was darkness, now life must spring forth."

The ruins of Mansión Seré were demolished during the construction of the sports center. In 2002, through the Mansión Seré Archaeological and Anthropological Project, excavations were started that managed to recover the foundations and build a memorial site of national and international relevance.

== The site today ==
The House of Memory and Life (Spanish: Casa de la Memoria y la Vida) and the Directorate of Human Rights began operating on the site in 2000. It is the first case in Latin America of the recovery of a space of these characteristics for historical memory – the first clandestine detention and torture center to become a place of rescue of memory, of action to modify the present, and of projection to build a different future. Now the "mansion" is located in the Gorki Grana.

Through national decree 2243/15 it was declared a National Historic Site.

The venue also hosts the La Minga! festival, where artists such as Manu Chao, Fito Páez, León Gieco, Vicentico, and Divididos have performed.

=== Gorki Grana ===
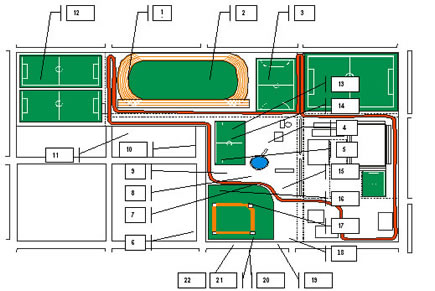
Plan of the property

The Gorki Grana Municipal Recreational and Sports Center is located on the site of the Mansión Sere clandestine detention center, on an 11-hectare property at 3530 Santa María de Oro Street, Castelar sur, Morón. It has sports and recreational facilities which can be accessed free of charge.

The property is used by 3,400 beneficiaries who participate in weekly Sports Directorate programs, and 2,300 who visit it every week as a place for leisure and recreation.

The Gorki Grana Sports and Recreation Center has spaces specially designed and maintained for sports practice: a track, 11-a-side football field, softball diamond, semi-indoor gym, hockey field, beach volleyball court, smaller football fields, shuffleboard courts, multipurpose room, swimming pool for people with disabilities, a sector of picnic areas, a playground, changing rooms and toilets, sports room, and doctor's office.

To highlight the facilities, the Municipal Sports Center has a covered micro-stadium of 4,150 square meters with capacity for 2,500 people. The new micro-stadium, inaugurated at the end of 2014, is used for social and training sports and is suitable for high performance sports competitions in disciplines such as volleyball, basketball, futsal, and gymnastics. It hosted the final of the Volleyball Master Cup in 2014, and Club Ciudad played its home matches there during the 2013-14, 2014-15, and 2015-16 Liga Argentina seasons, and the 2015 ACLAV Cup. The 2014 and 2016 editions of the Master Cup were also held here, as was the eighth edition of the World Union Karate Organization (WUKO-AD) World Cup in November 2016.

In addition, there is the Miguel Benancio Sánchez Library of Sports, Recreation, and Physical Activity, the Directorate of Sports and Recreation, the Directorate of Human Rights, and the House of Memory and Life.

== See also ==
- Clandestine detention center (Argentina)
