= Lucrecia Martel =

Argentine film director, screenwriter and film producer

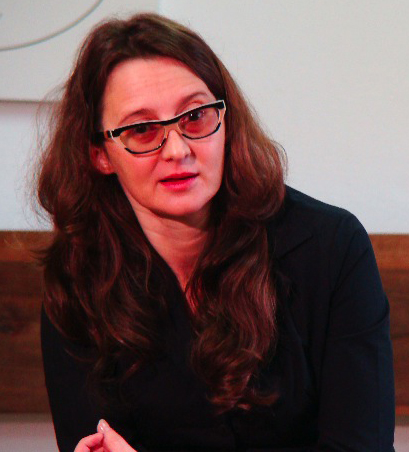
- Martel in 2019
- Born: December 14, 1966 (age 59); Salta, Argentina
- Education: University of Buenos Aires; National School of Film Experimentation and Production (ENERC)
- Occupations: Film director, screenwriter, producer
- Years active: 1988–present
- Notable work: La ciénaga (2001); The Holy Girl (2004); The Headless Woman (2008); Zama (2017)
- Partner: Julieta Laso (2016–present)
- Awards: full list

Lucrecia Martel (born December 14, 1966) is an Argentine film director, screenwriter, and producer whose feature films have frequented Cannes, Venice, Berlin, Toronto, and many other international film festivals. Film scholar Paul Julian Smith wrote in 2015 that she is "arguably the most critically acclaimed auteur in Spanish-language art cinema outside Latin America" and that her "transnational auteurism and demanding features have earned her a hard-won reputation in the world art cinema festival circuit". Similarly, film scholar Haden Guest has called her "one of the most prodigiously talented filmmakers in contemporary world cinema", and film scholar David Oubiña has called her body of work a "rare perfection". In April 2018, Vogue referred to her as "one of the greatest directors in the world right now".

Her 2001 debut feature film, La Ciénaga (The Swamp), about an indulgent bourgeois extended family spending the summertime in a decrepit vacation home in provincial Salta, Argentina, was internationally highly acclaimed upon release and introduced a new and vital voice to Argentine cinema. David Oubiña called it "one of the highest achievements" of the New Argentine Cinema, a wave of contemporary filmmaking that began in the mid-1990s in reaction to decades of political and economic crises in the country. The film, Oubiña wrote, is "a rare expression of an extremely troubled moment in the nation's recent history. It is a masterpiece of singular maturity".

Martel's succeeding three feature films received further international acclaim: the adolescent drama The Holy Girl (La niña santa) (2004), the psychological thriller The Headless Woman (La mujer sin cabeza) (2008), and the period drama Zama (2017).

== Early life ==
The second of seven children, Martel was born and raised in Salta. Her father Ferdi owned and operated a paint shop, while her mother Bochi dedicated herself to the family. Her parents met in university (where Ferdi studied science and Bochi studied philosophy) and got married at 24 years old. Eventually they left their careers and settled in Salta.

In primary school, Martel's uncle helped her develop interests in mythology, Greek, and Latin languages. In fifth grade, she set her sights on gaining admission to the elite, "ultra-Catholic" secondary school Bachillerato Humanista Moderno, because it was the only school in Salta that offered classes in ancient languages. Her parents opposed the school because of its elitist tradition which they felt reinforced class differences, but, because of the school's prominent alumni and Martel's intellectual curiosity, they did not stop her from her pursuit. Eventually, Martel passed the demanding entrance exam and enrolled in the school in the sixth grade. Since she came from a "solidly middle class" family, as she stated in a revealing 2008 interview with BOMB Magazine, Martel felt like an outsider at the school. Her peers, she said, attended the school because their families expected them to, while she only attended it so she could study Greek and Latin. In a 2018 interview with Gatopardo magazine, her mother said that at the school Martel was a "radical and challenging" honor roll student who excelled in science.

In her home, Martel says "there was a very deep devotion to storytelling." Her father, mother, and maternal grandmother Nicolasa were "very good storytellers" and would tell her and her six siblings "lots of stories" to keep them quiet in bed while the adults took their afternoon siesta. She was especially fascinated by the way her grandmother used different sounds, tones, and carefully selected pauses to establish "atmosphere" in her scary, fantastical stories. "As a child," Martel says, "and even today, I have always been captivated by the form not only of stories and storytelling, but also of conversation and the way people pause and leave space for someone to intervene. All the ways that, especially when you're a child, you're charmed and steered just by words alone." She says that her fascination with this "world of conversation" in oral storytelling is what fueled her passion for cinematic storytelling and the emphasis on sound in her films.

Martel first used a video camera when she was "15 or 16" years old, she says, after her father bought one to store memories of their large family. "A very big investment for us," she says of the camera, nobody in the family used it but her. "I began recording conversations and everyday things: family stuff," she says. "My family got used to it because I was always filming...There are two or three years in our family life where I don't appear at all in videos or photos, because I was always behind the camera. It was the discovery of something that fascinated me, but it didn't seem to me then that my future could be related to that."

When she was 17 years old, she accompanied her father to Buenos Aires and attended a cinema projection of Camila (1984), a film written and directed by María Luisa Bemberg and produced by Lita Stantic about a real and tragic love story between a priest and a young lady of Buenos Aires high society. Impressed with the film's women creators and mainstream success, Martel says that as a result of the viewing she "thought the cinema was a woman's job", a "confusion", as she describes it, that "stayed with [her]" for years.

== Education ==
Upon graduating from secondary school, Martel intended to study physics at the Balseiro Institute, but she "started to have doubts" and instead enrolled in an art history course at the National University of Salta, as well as in chemical engineering and zoology courses in Tucumán, a nearby province. "Suffer[ing] uncertainty" and trying to decide "what to study or do with [her] life", she farmed pigs that year, too—breeding, raising, and selling them—and even considered making it her future livelihood. However, poor sales of just two pigs per month proved it would not be a feasible career option for her.

At the end of that school year, Martel traveled to Buenos Aires to study advertising at the Catholic University. The program combined creativity and technique, so she and her family thought it could work for her. Although Martel says she lost her Catholic faith at 15 years old, at the university she volunteered with Catholic Action and spoke against abortion. Feeling uncomfortable, she decided to distance herself from the faith and leave the school to pursue the new communication sciences degree program at the University of Buenos Aires. She describes the program as "a typical post-transition-to-democracy program made to train journalists and media analysts. Of course, it was an area of Argentine culture that had been hit especially hard by the years of dictatorship. There were very interesting professors who were returning from exile at the time, people with more left-leaning ways of thinking. It was a good moment for the program because no one quite knew exactly what this career entailed." She completed all of the degree requirements, she says, but "didn't do any of the paperwork toward receiving the [actual] degree". However, she believes that her time at the school "helped [her] out a lot".

Not wanting to neglect her interests in the technical and the creative, while at the University of Buenos Aires she enrolled in a nighttime animation course at the Film Art Institute of Avellaneda (IDAC) located about 5.5 miles away, which Martel describes was a significant commute at the time. "Something of the scientific spirit in me remained," she says regarding her decision to enroll in the school, "and I liked how animation was very technical, precise, and controlled". At the school, she started to meet people who were studying film and began to produce short films.

While at IDAC, she decided to take the admission exam for Argentina's only state-sponsored film school at the time—the National School of Film Experimentation and Production (ENERC). Since over 1,000 people signed up for the exam and only 30 vacancies existed at the school, applicants were required to take a "huge qualifying course", which Martel says she spent months preparing for. After she "finally got in", the school closed due to lack of funds. "When school was supposed to start," she says, "the economic crisis was already so severe that there weren't any professors or materials. We didn't have classes. The only real possibility was to study autodidactically, to watch films and analyze them. I watched Pink Floyd: The Wall 23 times, analyzing the montage. We would watch a film many times to learn how it was edited. I was learning in many different ways—participating in short films that friends were making, helping with production or photography, anything just to keep learning." Martel has maintained in interviews that she was self-taught.

== Career ==
=== Early career ===
While attending IDAC, Martel directed the animated short films El 56 ("The 56") in 1988 and Piso 24 ("24th Floor") in 1989.

As a film student at ENERC, Martel directed No te la llevarás, maldito ("You Won't Get Her, Bastard", 1989), a short film about a jealous boy who fantasizes about killing his mother's boyfriend. Film scholar Deborah Martin wrote that in the film, "there is an exploration of the subversive power of children that would become a crucial feature of [Martel's] later work, as a little boy's murderous Oedipal feelings towards his mother's lover are fully unleashed in a fantasy he lives out through his drawings."

Another short film Martel directed as a student is La otra ("The Other", 1990), a documentary about a man who talks about the joys and sorrows of his life as a transvestite as he dresses up as a woman to sing tangos at a nightclub.

Next, Martel directed Besos rojos ("Red Kisses", 1991), a short film based on a real-life police case between three lovers caught in a love triangle.

Martel says that "just when [she] was starting to think that [a career in] film was impossible, that it was time for [her] to get a (real) job," she entered a public script competition organized by the Argentine National Film Board (INCAA), the grand prize for which was the budget to produce a short film. Martel won the contest and, as a result, was able to produce her breakout film Rey muerto ("Dead King", 1995), a violent western about a woman who escapes her abusive, alcoholic husband with her three children in a small town called Rey Muerto in provincial Salta. It went on to win Best Short Film at the 1995 Havana Film Festival.

Rey muerto was exhibited in Argentina as part of a larger omnibus film called Historias breves ("Short Stories", 1995). Martel explains that this compilation film was "unprecedented in the country" and came about after all the directors of the other winning short films in the script contest banded together and visited the INCAA headquarters in Buenos Aires repeatedly to ask the contest organizers to premiere all the short films as a string of films in a theater. Martel says that she and her fellow filmmakers "sat for hours until [the contest organizers] would meet with us. We argued that it was a waste of state funding if they didn't exhibit the finished films." As a result, the films were exhibited on the dedicated screens of the national public circuit run by INCAA. Martel says that the premiere of Historias breves was "very successful" and drew 10,000 viewers. "It also inspired people," she says, "to study filmmaking and to start making shorts. It was a really important phenomenon in spiritual terms. Curiously, many of the directors who began their careers at the time—'95 or '96—are still making films today. That event inaugurated the activity of a lot of directors, and also a lot of young people's interest in film." Film scholar Haden Guest says it helped inaugurate the New Argentine Cinema and "is really where the [movement] began".

Martel says that "thanks to Rey muerto, [she] started to get jobs in television." From 1995 to 1999 she directed the unconventional children's program Magazine For Fai, in which child actors performed in different sketch comedies. In a 2013 interview with ABC Color, Martel says the show "became a cult for children.... It was not commercially known, but there are a lot of young people who saw it. Many of its actors are now stars of Argentine cinema." She also made two documentaries for television: Encarnación Ezcurra (1998), about the eponymous wife of Argentine politician and army officer Juan Manuel de Rosas, and Las dependencias (The Outbuildings) (1999), a reconstruction of the life of the celebrated Argentine short fiction writer Silvina Ocampo, which draws on the testimonies of Ocampo's servants and friends.

=== Salta trilogy ===
In 1999, Martel's screenplay for her debut feature film La Ciénaga won the Sundance Institute/NHK Award, which honors and supports emerging independent filmmakers "who contribute to the world's visual culture and promote cultural exchanges". The jury recommended that she re-write the script to follow a more traditional structure around one or two protagonists, but Martel chose instead to retain the script's diffuse nature. To cast the film's child actors, Martel held 2,400 auditions, 1,600 of which she recorded on video in a garage near her home in Salta.

In 2001, Martel was selected for the third edition of the Cannes Film Festival Cinéfondation artist-in-residence program, designed to inspire and support young international filmmakers working on their first or second feature film. As part of the program, Martel lived in Paris for four and a half months, attended forums and worked with film industry professionals in developing her second feature film, The Holy Girl, which premiered in 2004.

Together with The Headless Woman, Martel's first three feature films make up what Gatopardo called "a trilogy dedicated to women and Salta," writing, "The three scripts were written by her, the three films were filmed in Salta, and, in all, always, something unexpected alters family cosmology. The characters see the life that they have armed, but, although a magma of bad omens descends on them, they do not react. In La Ciénaga, it is a domestic accident that the mother of a large family suffers. In The Holy Girl (La niña santa), it is a doctor who arrives in a town and stays in a hotel where the owner lives with her teenage daughter, a student of a religious school. In The Headless Woman (La mujer sin cabeza), it is an accident on a deserted route and a family cover-up to hide guilt and tragedy."

"Martel's filmic trilogy about life in the province of Salta, Argentina," writes film scholar Paul A. Schroeder Rodríguez, "explores the country's incomplete transition to democracy from the perspective of strong, intelligent, and socially privileged female protagonists who do not conform to dominant patriarchal values: first during childhood in La Ciénaga (The Swamp, 2001), then during sexual awakening in La niña santa (The Holy Girl, 2004); and finally in adulthood, in La mujer sin cabeza (The Headless Woman, 2008)"...Martel's work is finely tuned to the particular rhythms and values of provincial middle-class Argentina, a world whose economic stagnation and moral bankruptcy she dissects through narratives that play on viewers' sympathies by constantly shifting between favorable and unfavorable perspectives on her characters."

==== Critical reception ====
Filmmaker magazine wrote, "[Martel's] debut feature La Ciénaga premiered at Sundance, won the Alfred Bauer Award at Berlin, and received rave reviews wherever it played. Martel's 2004 follow-up, The Holy Girl, about the sexual and religious passions of two Argentinian teenage girls, premiered at Cannes and consolidated Martel's reputation as one of the finest emerging talents in world cinema."

Film scholar Paul Julian Smith wrote that although "Martel has had to rely rather on a cocktail of small, mainly European, production companies" to fund her films, "industrial constraints and transnational flow have not compromised [her] artistic individuality...[Her] severe art movie aesthetics identify her with other transnational auteurs favoured on the festival circuit."

La Ciénaga received numerous international awards, and The Holy Girl and The Headless Woman were nominated for the Palme d'Or at the Cannes Film Festivals of 2004 and 2008, respectively.

In a survey of 35 prominent film critics, scholars and industry professionals based in New York City, all three feature films figured among the top ten Latin American films of the decade, with La Ciénaga taking top place, beating the better-known (and more accessible) works of the Mexican male triad of Alejandro González Iñárritu, Alfonso Cuarón, and Guillermo del Toro.

In August 2016, The Headless Woman ranked #89 on BBC's 100 Greatest Films of the 21st Century, polled from 177 film critics around the world.

==== Academic attention ====
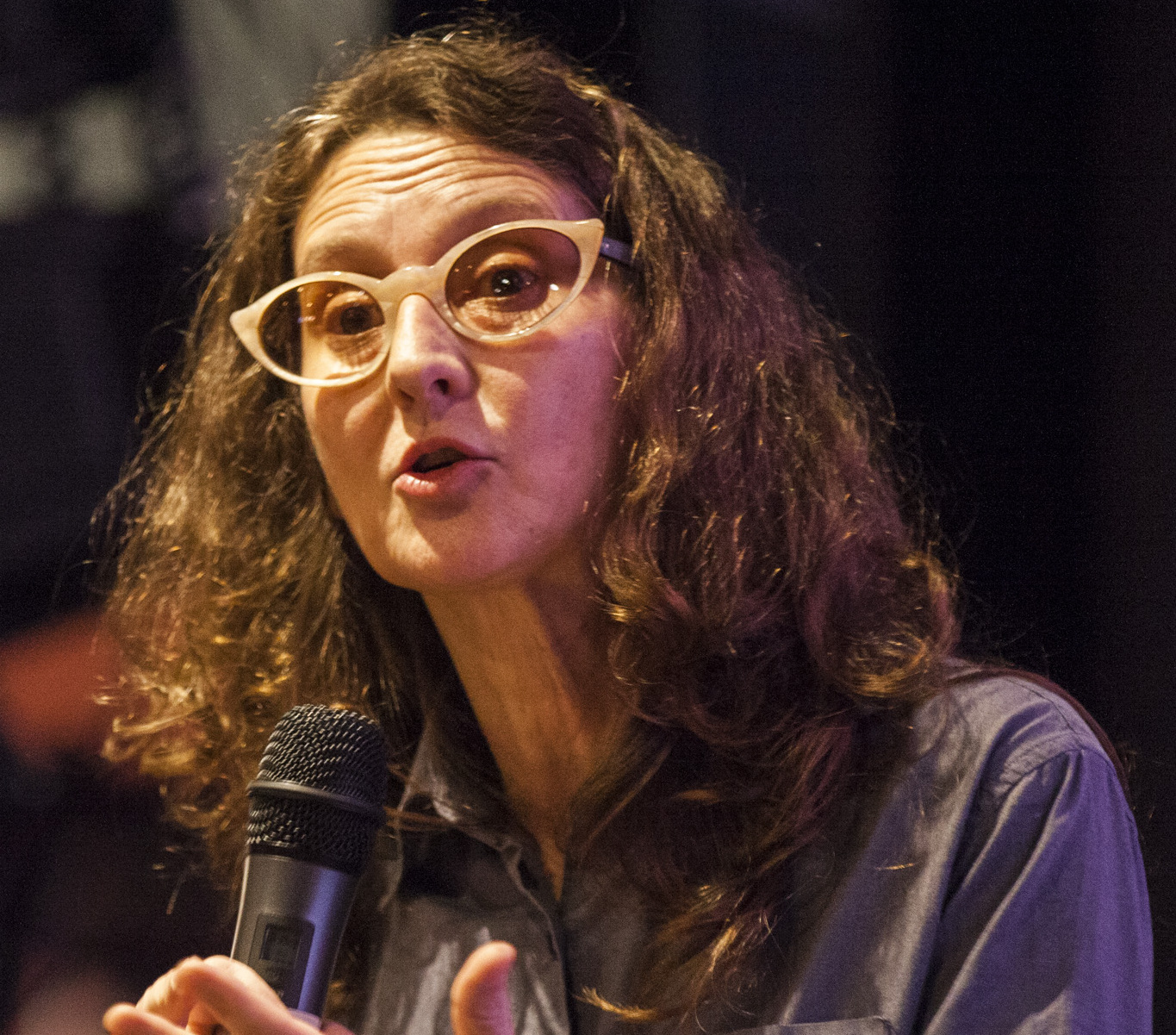
Lucrecia Martel's Masterclass at the 33 Festival Internacional, 2018

Martel's work has also attracted a good deal of academic attention. Many scholars have written extensively regarding the films' critiques of gender and sexuality, as well as its bold depictions of class, race, nationality, and colonialism.

Film scholar Deborah Shaw argues that the trilogy "presents an anatomy of Argentine, bourgeois female identity" and "explores the micropolitics of gender, sexuality and location, rather than national narratives of oppression and collective liberation".

Paul A. Schroeder Rodríguez described the films as "Oedipal with a vengeance" and argues that "each of the films is set up as a dialectic between a desiring female subject and the hegemonic patriarchal reality."

Film scholar Deborah Martin wrote a full-length book on Martel's oeuvre, published in May 2016, in which she argues that Martel's films "demonstrate possibilities of rupture and escape through her cinematic recreations of rebellious young girls' forbidden desires.... Despite the fact that these films depict in detail structures of social and political oppression, desire acts as an uncontrollable and multiple force which can overcome these structures."

In 2024 the Edinburgh University Press published ReFocus: the Films of Lucrecia Martel, a collective look at Martel’s works, including her short films and their impacts on audiences and film study. ReFocus is a series of books published by the Edinburgh University Press that expands on various directors and their works. In this collective, Martel’s four feature films are discussed alongside her films such as Muta, Pescados, and Nueva Argirópolis. In the introduction by Natalia Christofoletti Barrenha, Julia Kretje, and Paul R. Merchant, they talk about Martel and how her works impacted many, and that “In addition to such popular expressions of admiration, Martel’s films have received critical acclaim, prestigious awards and significant scholarly attention, both in her native Argentina and among scholars of global cinema. Yet to date no one volume has set out to provide a comprehensive view of Martel’s work (whether in fiction, documentary or essayistic short film) and of the range of critical responses it can generate. The chapters in this collection are authored by some of the most prominent scholars of Martel’s films and by emergent voices, and offer a fresh set of perspectives (alongside two translations of landmark essays not previously available in English) that build on existing critical trends and suggest promising new avenues for research.”

=== Post-trilogy work ===
In May 2008, Martel was reported as slated to direct the film adaptation of The Eternaut, the very popular Argentine science fiction comic strip created by Héctor Germán Oesterheld and Francisco Solano López in 1957 about a toxic snowfall and alien invasion of Buenos Aires. In October 2008, Martel said of the project to BOMB Magazine: "I sent my idea of how to adapt it to the producer, and he was interested. I also know that members of the Oesterheld family liked it." According to film scholar Deborah Martin, Martel was adapting it as a "meditation on power and social class in Buenos Aires." In 2009, however, the project was dropped, after significant work had been undertaken on it, due to conceptual differences with the producer.

Martel's 2010 short film Nueva Agirópolis ("New Argirópolis") metaphorically represents indigenous people's resistance to capture and interrogation by the Argentine state as well as the inevitable cultural hybridization that ensues between the two nations despite that resistance. It takes its name from the 1850 book Argirópolis, written by former Argentine President and political activist Domingo Faustino Sarmiento, in which Argirópolis is the name of the capital city of a utopian democratic confederacy among Argentina, Uruguay, and Paraguay. The short film was commissioned by the Argentine Ministry of Culture as part of the Bicentennial celebrations and shown in theaters as part of the larger anthology film 25 miradas, 200 minutos ("25 Looks, 200 Minutes", 2010), an introspective look at the history of Argentina from the point of view of 25 film directors.

In July 2011, Martel's short film Muta ("Mutate") premiered at an invitation-only event in Beverly Hills attended by stars like Emma Roberts, Hailee Steinfeld, Ashley Tisdale, Cat Deeley, Diane Kruger, Jeremy Renner, and Marilyn Manson. Commissioned by Miu Miu, the Italian high fashion company owned by Prada, the film is the second installment of the company's Women's Tales film series, which consists of short films produced in conjunction with high-profile international female directors. Directed and co-written by Martel, the film depicts a luxury modernist ghost ship haunted by faceless, insect-like female creatures attempting to rid themselves of the only man trying to get on board.

In her short film Leguas ("Leagues", 2015), Martel explores the subject of academic exclusion in Argentina's indigenous communities. Named after an archaic unit of measurement, the film depicts how education, though a social tool, can also create division and discrimination. It was distributed as part of the anthology documentary film El aula vacía ("The Empty Classroom", 2015), in which eleven award-winning directors examine the underlying reasons why nearly one out of every two Latin American students never graduates high school.

=== Recent career ===
Martel's fourth feature film Zama premiered at the Venice International Film Festival in August 2017. An adaptation of Antonio di Benedetto's 1956 novel of the same name, it narrates the tragic story of Don Diego de Zama, a Spanish colonial functionary stationed in Asunción, Paraguay who waits, in vain, for his superiors to authorize his return home to his wife and family. It was an international co-production among eight countries: Argentina, Brazil, Spain, Mexico, France, the U.S., the Netherlands, and Portugal, with stars like Pedro Almodóvar, Gael García Bernal, and Danny Glover among its long list of producers. It went on to screen at the Toronto International Film Festival and New York Film Festival and received widespread acclaim from critics.

For Gatopardo, Mónica Yemayel wrote "Like the other characters of Lucrecia Martel, only now in the late 18th century, Diego de Zama is unable to take charge of his own life; his fate is left in the hands of others. The identity that he has imposed on himself and that others have imposed on him is his prison." Rolling Stone of Argentina wrote "[Zama] is not an easy bone to crack. Martel delivers her most abstract, most ungraspable, most mysterious creation yet." British newspaper The Guardian wrote "I hope Martel won't have to wait a further nine years before she makes her next film. She's too good a director to be sat on the sidelines for long and Zama may just be her left-field masterpiece; a picture that's antic, sensual and strange, with a top-note of menace and a malarial air." The film was chosen to represent Argentina in the Oscar and Goya Awards, the latter of which it received the nomination for Best Spanish Language Foreign Film.

In May 2018, Martel was filmmaker-in-residence at the University of Cambridge, where she offered a sequence of seminars on her filmmaking practice to students, staff, and the university community. Also in 2018, Martel was approached by Marvel Studios to direct Black Widow, but declined because she wanted to be able to direct her own action scenes.

In May 2019, Martel directed Icelandic singer Björk in Cornucopia, a theatrical concert production at The Shed, an arts center in Manhattan.

In April 2023, Martel was celebrated as the guest of honor at Visions du Réel, an international documentary film festival in Switzerland. During the event, Martel spoke about her upcoming documentary Chocobar, which examines indigenous land rights and the legacy of colonialism in Argentina. Describing her first venture into non-fiction, Martel explained, "I am learning as I’m doing, that’s why it’s taking so long."

Martel directed the 2025 film Our Land, about the murder of indigenous leader Javier Chocobar and the legacy of colonialism on Latin America.

== Personal life ==
Martel has cited María Luisa Bemberg, Ingmar Bergman, and Pedro Almodóvar as influences.

She was a member of the 2006 Cannes Film Festival Feature Films Jury, alongside Wong Kar-wai, Helena Bonham Carter, and Samuel L. Jackson.

In February 2016, while editing Zama, Martel was diagnosed with uterine cancer. She stated that her illness caused a delay in the film's post-production but ultimately catalyzed its completion. In November 2017, IndieWire reported that she has been in remission since late 2016.

Martel is lesbian. She came out to her family before the 2001 premiere of La Ciénaga because she was worried about their reaction to the implicit homosexuality depicted in the film. Her mother responded well and said she had known it since Martel was seven years old. Martel is in a relationship with singer Julieta Laso, former lead vocalist of the Fernández Fierro Orchestra.

As of June 2018, she lives in the Buenos Aires neighborhood of Villa Crespo.

== Filmography ==
=== Feature films ===
Year	English Title	Original title	Notes
2001	La ciénaga		
2004	The Holy Girl	La niña santa	
2008	The Headless Woman	La mujer sin cabeza	
2017	Zama		
2025	Our Land	Nuestra Tierra	Documentary

=== Short films ===
Year	English title	Original title	Notes
1988	The 56	El 56	—N/a
1989	24th Floor	Piso 24	—N/a
1989	You Won't Get Her, Bastard	No te la llevarás, maldito	—N/a
1990	The Other	El Otro	—N/a
1991	Red Kisses	Besos Rojos	—N/a
1995	Dead King	Rey muerto	Part of the 1995 anthology film Historias breves (Short Stories).
2006	The City that Flees	La ciudad que huye	—N/a
2010	New Argirópolis	Nueva Argirópolis	Part of 2010 the anthology film 25 miradas, 200 minutos (25 Looks, 200 Minutes).
2010	Fishes	Pescados	—N/a
2011	Mutate	Muta	—N/a
2015	Leagues	Leguas	Part of the anthology documentary film El aula vacía (The Empty Classroom).
2019	AI	AI	Festival trailer for the Viennale
2021	North Terminal	Terminal Norte	—N/a
2022	Maid	Camarera de piso	—N/a

=== Television ===
Year	Title
1995–1999	Magazine For Fai
1998	Encarnación Ezcurra
1999	Las dependencias (The Outbuildings)

== Awards and nominations ==
Year	Award	Category	Film	Result	Ref.
1995	Havana Film Festival	Best Short Film (Coral)	Rey muerto	Won	
1999	Sundance Film Festival	NHK Award	La Ciénaga	Won	
2001	Berlin International Film Festival	Golden Bear	La Ciénaga	Nominated	
2001	Berlin International Film Festival	Alfred Bauer Prize	La Ciénaga	Won	
2001	Havana Film Festival	Best Film (Grand Coral - First Prize)	La Ciénaga	Won	
2001	Havana Film Festival	Best Director	La Ciénaga	Won	
2001	Toulouse Latin America Film Festival	Grand Prix	La Ciénaga	Won	
2001	Toulouse Latin America Film Festival	French Critics' Discovery Award	La Ciénaga	Won	
2002	MTV Movie Awards Latin America	Favorite Movie - Argentina	La Ciénaga	Nominated	
2004	Cannes Film Festival	Palme d'Or	The Holy Girl	Nominated	
2005	Reykjavík International Film Festival	Golden Puffin	The Holy Girl	Nominated	
2005	Reykjavík International Film Festival	Special Mention	The Holy Girl	Won	
2008	Cannes Film Festival	Palme d'Or	The Headless Woman	Nominated	
2017	Havana Film Festival	Best Film (Grand Coral)	Zama	Nominated	
2017	Havana Film Festival	Best Director	Zama	Won	
2017	Havana Film Festival	FIPRESCI Award	Zama	Won	
2017	Seville European Film Festival	Golden Giraldillo	Zama	Nominated	
2017	Seville European Film Festival	Special Jury Award	Zama	Won	
2018	Goya Awards	Best Iberoamerican Film	Zama	Nominated	
2020	Locarno Festival	Films After Tomorrow	Chocobar	Won	
2025	BFI London Film Festival	Best Film	Landmarks	Won	

== See also ==
- List of female film and television directors
- List of lesbian filmmakers
- List of LGBT-related films directed by women
