= Chronicle of an Escape =

- Theatrical release poster
- Directed by: Israel Adrián Caetano
- Screenplay by: Israel Adrián Caetano; Esteban Student; Julian Loyola
- Based on: The novel Pase libre: la fuga de la Mansión Seré by Claudio Tamburrini
- Produced by: Oscar Kramer; Hugo Sigman
- Starring: Rodrigo de la Serna; Pablo Echarri; Nazareno Casero
- Cinematography: Julián Apezteguia
- Edited by: Alberto Ponce
- Music by: Ivan Wyszogrod
- Production companies: 20th Century Fox; Instituto Nacional de Cine y Artes Audiovisuales (INCAA); K&S Films
- Distributed by: 20th Century Fox
- Release date: 24 March 2006
- Running time: 104 minutes
- Country: Argentina
- Language: Spanish

Chronicle of an Escape (Spanish: Crónica de una fuga), also known as Buenos Aires, 1977, is a 2006 Argentine historical drama film directed by Israel Adrián Caetano. The screenplay is written by Caetano, Esteban Student, and Julián Loyola, based on the autobiographical book Pase libre – la fuga de la Mansion Seré written by Claudio Tamburrini. The film was produced by Oscar Kramer and Hugo Sigman, and stars Rodrigo de la Serna, Pablo Echarri and Nazareno Casero. The film tells the true story of four men who narrowly escaped death at the hands of a military death squad during Argentina's last civil-military dictatorship (1976–1983).

Winner of the Silver Condor Award for Best Film, it was Argentina's entry for the 2007 Golden Globes Awards for the Best Foreign Language Film, and director Israel Adrián Caetano was nominated at the 2006 Cannes Film Festival for a Golden Palm.

== Plot ==
On 23 November 1977, during Argentina's last civil-military dictatorship, Claudio Tamburrini (Rodrigo de la Serna), a goalie for a minor league soccer team in Buenos Aires, is abducted by members of the Argentine secret military police. He is taken to a detention center known as Mansión Seré: an old dilapidated house in the suburban neighborhood of Morón on the suspicion he is a guerrilla man who opposes the dictatorship.

Blindfolded, Tamburrini is tortured daily by his jailers, who demand information he does not have because he is not a political activist and never was. Tamburrini discovers an acquaintance nicknamed El Tano, whom he has met twice in his life, has lied under torture and falsely implicated him, claiming he has a mimeograph. On New Year's Eve, Huguito, the lead captor, teases Tamburrini by implying he is about to be released. Instead, he is taken to another room with more men. When Huguito insists Tamburrini remove his blindfold and look at him, Tamburrini understands he will never be released alive.

He attacks Tano, who really is a member of a radical group. Tano claims he had no choice but to implicate Tamburrini after his name was discovered in Tano's address book. He insists that since Tamburrini is really innocent, he will be released eventually, but Tamburrini knows better. A new captive, Guillermo (Nazareno Casero), arrives and admits that he was really the one with the mimeograph, which he used to make fake papers for Tano. Tamburrini hopes that now he will be released, but Guillermo tells him that to have any chance of saving himself, he will have to implicate someone else, which Tamburrini refuses to do. Tano and a dozen other captives are told they are being transferred to prison but in reality are drugged and handed over to the Argentine Air Force, presumably being executed on a death flight.

Tamburrini expects to be killed by the ruthless guards at any time. After four months of imprisonment, and many sessions of torture, Tamburrini and his fellow captives Guillermo, Vasco and Gallego dive out a window during a thunderstorm. The four, naked and with nothing but their senses, begin a desperate flight to freedom. After a night hiding in the suburbs, the four men get ahold of some money and clothes and part ways; three of them leave the country, including Tamburrini, whom years later writes the book in which the film is based on.

== Cast ==
- Rodrigo de la Serna as Claudio Tamburrini
- Pablo Echarri as Huguito
- Nazareno Casero as Guillermo Fernández
- Daniel Valenzuela as El Alemán ("The German")
- Lautaro Delgado as El Gallego ("The Galician")
- Matías Marmorato as El Vasco ("The Basque")
- Martín Urruty as El Tano ("The Italian")
- Diego Alonso Gómez as Lucas
- Leonardo Bargiga as Capitán Almagro
- Micaela Vázquez as Tamburrini's sister

== Production ==
=== Historical context and factual basis of the film ===
The film is based on a real political event that took place in Argentina during Jorge Rafael Videla's reactionary military junta, which came to be known as Argentina's last civil-military dictatorship. The dictatorship took over the government after a Coup on 24 March 1976. During the junta's rule, the Congress was suspended and unions, political parties and provincial governments were banned. During the period that became known abroad as "the Dirty War", between 9,000 and 30,000 people were disappeared as a result of direct State-sponsored terrorism by the military government.

The film is about one such instance: the November 1977 kidnapping of Claudio Tamburrini, a goalkeeper of a B-league fútbol team, who's taken to a clandestine detention center and tortured. On 24 March 1978, Tamburrini escaped along with Guillermo Fernández, Carlos García Muñoz (El Gallego), and Daniel Rusomano (known as El Chino in the book), and wrote Pase libre – la fuga de la Mansion Seré, a harrowing account of his experience.

=== Themes ===
Before the production began director Israel Adrián Caetano traveled to meet Tamburrini in Stockholm, where he now lives, to learn the truth about the event. There he also met Fernández, who initiated the breakout. Both former prisoners collaborated with Caetano and the screenwriters and helped them to stick closely to the main theme of the film: survival.

The production was quite difficult according to Caetano, who stated that "the filming was an endless challenge: shooting almost entirely within four walls, trusting the outcome to the acting, the framing, and the light. It was not always easy to generate fear, paranoia, and neurosis from this prison. Our challenge was how to re-create the madness these prisoners endured".

== Reception ==
The Hollywood Reporter's John DeFore thinks American audiences will like the thriller and its pace, especially after the men escape in the rain. He believes that Chronicle of an Escape will give American audiences "an icky feeling" when they view the "fact-based Argentine story through the stylized lens of a horror film. Laced with dread that builds to a thoroughly gripping third act, it should do well with art house audiences who like their history lessons to come with a shot of adrenaline."

Critic Deborah Young, writing for Variety magazine, generally liked the film yet felt the film's atonal score was at times irritating. She wrote, "[F]orceful acting plays a key role in giving the story credibility, with De La Serna and Casero lighting the way." She also says the film "feels hollow at the core, leaving a feeling of lingering disappointment over a missed opportunity to probe recent history."

Critic Clark Collis liked the film and wrote, "Chronicle of an Escape's premise may remind you of Sly Stallone's enjoyably preposterous 1981 soccer/incarceration flick, Victory, but this true-story-based movie scores in a different way...The result is blessed with great performances; director Israel Adrián Caetano lets events speak — and plead and weep — for themselves."

Stephen Holden, critic for The New York Times, discussed the film from today's political perspective in the United States. He wrote, "Despite its restraint, Chronicle of an Escape is deeply unsettling. Although the events it depicts happened 30 years ago in South America, it inevitably triggers anguished thoughts of Abu Ghraib, Guantánamo Bay and extraordinary rendition... But as a suspenseful drama of captivity and escape, the movie is a carefully paced, persuasively acted thriller. Its first two-thirds observe Claudio's four-month internment, during which he becomes resigned to the idea that he will be killed. Unlike the other captives, he does not belong to a subversive group; midway through the film he discovers to his fury that an acquaintance and fellow prisoner, while under torture, lied and named him as the owner of a mimeograph machine that printed antigovernment leaflets. The message is explicit: Torture may make people talk, but they’ll say anything to avoid further abuse."

Critic Jan Stuart echoed Stephen Holden and wrote, "If there is anything more disturbing than any of the tortures glimpsed in the film, it is turning on the evening news afterward and being reminded that the use of such hardball practices are still, in the minds of some, a subject for debate."

On the review aggregator website Rotten Tomatoes, 67% of 15 critics' reviews are positive, with an average rating of 5.8/10.

== Accolades ==
=== Awards ===
- Clarín Awards: Clarin Award; Best Director, Adrián Caetano; Best Film; Best New Actor, Nazareno Casero; Best Original Music, Iván Wyszogrod; Best Screenplay, Adrián Caetano, Esteban Student, and Julian Loyola; Best Supporting Actor, Nazareno Casero; 2006.
- Argentine Academy of Cinematography Arts and Sciences Awards: Premios Sur; Best Supporting Actor, Nazareno Casero; Best New Actor, Nazareno Casero; Best Original Music, Iván Wyszogrod, 2006.
- Argentine Film Critics Association Awards: Silver Condor, Best Editing, Alberto Ponce; Best Film; Best Adapted Screenplay, Adrián Caetano, Julian Loyola, and Esteban Student; 2007.

=== Nominations ===
- Cannes Film Festival: Golden Palm, Adrián Caetano, 2006.
- Independent Spirit Awards: Independent Spirit Award Best Foreign Film, Adrián Caetano, Argentina, 2007.
- Argentine Film Critics Association Awards: Silver Condor, Best Actor, Rodrigo De la Serna; Best Art Direction, Juan Mario Roust and Jorge Ferrari; Best Cinematography, Julián Apezteguía; Best Director, Adrián Caetano; Best Music, Iván Wyszogrod; Best Sound, Fernando Soldevila; Best Supporting Actor, Nazareno Casero; Best Supporting Actor, Pablo Echarri; 2007.
- Penthouse Film of the Year: Golden Woodie, Adrián Caetano, 2006.

== Distribution ==
The film first opened in Argentina on 24 March 2006. The film was shown at various film festivals, including the 2006 Cannes Film Festival, France; the Toronto International Film Festival, Canada; the Toulouse Latin America Film Festival, France; the Espoo Ciné International Film Festival, Finland, and others.

In the United States it was featured at the Austin Film Festival in Texas on 26 October 2006.
