= Santiago Ricci =

Argentine film editor

- Occupation: Entrepreneur

Santiago Ricci (also known as Roi) is an Argentine film and commercial editor, and commercial director.

He has worked on films including Bolivia (2001), La ciénaga, (2001), Un oso rojo (2002), La niña santa (2004) and Rives (2011).

== Filmography ==
- Lisboa (1999) a.k.a. Lisbon
- Tesoro mío (2000) a.k.a. Los aventureros de Rosario
- Bolivia (2001)
- La ciénaga (2001) a.k.a. The Swamp
- Negro (2001)
- Sudeste (2001) a.k.a. Southeast
- Un oso rojo (2002) a.k.a. A Red Bear
- La niña santa (2004) a.k.a. The Holy Girl
- La vida por Perón (2005) a.k.a. My Life for Perón
- Rives (2011) a.k.a. Day
