= Luis Margani =

Italian-born Argentine actor (1948–2026)

Luis Margani (4 September 1948 – 5 July 2026) was an Italian-born Argentine film and television actor.

== Life and career ==
Margani was born in Sicily, Italy on 4 September 1948. He worked in the cinema of Argentina.

Margani died on 5 July 2026, at the age of 77.

== Filmography ==
- Negocios (1995)
- Mundo Grúa (1999) Crane World
- Una noche con Sabrina Love (2000) aka A Night with Sabrina Love
- La Fiebre del Loco (2001) aka Loco Fever
- La Fuga (2001) aka The Escape
- Navidad en el placard (2004)
- El Favor (2004)
- Tus ojos brillaban (2004)
- El Escape de Gaspar (2004)
- Dar de nuevo (2005)
- Un Minuto de silencio (2005)
- Toro (2005)
- Recortadas (film) (2008)

== Television ==
- "Luna salvaje" (2000) TV Series aka Wild Moon
- "Enamorarte" (2001) TV Series aka Young Lovers
- "Cuatro amigas" (2001) Mini TV Series aka Four Friends
- "Los Buscas de siempre" (2000) TV Series aka The Searches
- "Costumbres argentinas" (2003) TV Series aka Family Affairs
- "Resistiré" (2003) TV Series aka Forever Julia
- "Mujeres asesinas" TV Series
- "El Presidente" (2020) TV Series
