= Chiche bombón =

2004 Argentine romantic drama film by Fernando Musa

- Poster
- Directed by: Fernando Musa
- Written by: Fernando Musa, Gustavo Romero Borri
- Produced by: Javier Leoz
- Cinematography: Daniel Ortega, Carlos Torlaschi
- Edited by: César Custodio
- Music by: Iván Wyszogrod
- Release date: 21 October 2004
- Running time: 90 minutes
- Country: Argentina
- Language: Spanish

Chiche and Marianito

Chiche bombón is a 2004 Argentine romantic drama film directed and written by Fernando Musa. The film stars Iván de Pineda and Andrea Galante. The film is set in San Luis, Argentina, and Andrea Galante portrays a failed actress with diminishing prospects, becoming pregnant and living in poverty.

== Cast ==
- Andrea Galante as Chiche
- Federico Canepa as Marianito
- Ingrid Pelicori as Ana
- Enrique Liporace as Manrique
- Vivian El Jaber as Hija chusma
- Gonzalo Urtizberéa as Concejal Gutiérrez
- María José Gabín as Misionera
- Juan Carlos Galván as Hombre del comité
- Reneé Roxana Darín as Madre chusma
- Miguel Dedovich as Tintorero
- Oscar Di Sisto as Hombre anteojos comité
- Alicia Muxo as Mujer agencia de empleos
- Enrique Biaggio as Padre Marianito
- Ana María Segura as Madre Marianito
- Emiliano Montes as Chico plaza
- Claudia Retamal as Chica plaza
