= When She Jumped =

- Poster
- Directed by: Sabrina Farji
- Written by: Lucía Ercasi, Sabrina Farji
- Produced by: Jorge Poleri
- Cinematography: Martín Mohadeb
- Edited by: Ian Kornfeld
- Distributed by: Instituto Nacional de Cine y Artes Audiovisuales (INCAA) Primer Plano Film Group S.A.
- Release date: November 1, 2007
- Running time: 97 minutes
- Country: Argentina
- Language: Spanish

Cuando ella saltó is a 2007 Argentine drama film directed and written by Sabrina Farji. The film stars Iván de Pineda and Andrea Galante and deals with the theme of suicide.

Iván de Pineda received the 2008 Best New Actor Silver Condor award for his performance as Ramiro.

== Cast ==
- Iván de Pineda as Ramiro
- Andrea Galante as Lila / Ángela
- Juan M. Aguiar as Neighbour
- Boy Olmi as El Zafiro
- Lalo Mir as El Licenciado
- Victoria Carreras as Diana Triada
- Sandra Ballesteros as Ana
- Leonardo Ramírez as Seferino
- Darío Levy as Uno
- Diego Cosin as Dos
- Antonia De Michelis as nurse
- Zoe Trilnick Farji as Niña Gitana
