= The Holy Girl =

- Theatrical release poster
- Directed by: Lucrecia Martel
- Written by: Lucrecia Martel
- Produced by: Lita Stantic
- Starring: Mercedes Morán; Carlos Belloso; Alejandro Urdapilleta; María Alche
- Cinematography: Félix Monti
- Edited by: Santiago Ricci
- Music by: Andres Gerszenzon
- Production companies: El Deseo; Lita Stantic Producciones
- Distributed by: Alfa Films (Argentina); Teodora Film (Italy); Wanda Vision (Spain); Cinemien (Netherlands)
- Release date: 16 May 2004 (Argentina)
- Running time: 106 minutes
- Countries: Argentina; Italy; Spain; Netherlands
- Language: Spanish

The Holy Girl (Spanish: La niña santa) is a 2004 coming-of-age psychological drama film directed by Lucrecia Martel. The film was executively produced by Pedro Almodóvar and features Mercedes Morán, María Alche, Carlos Belloso, Alejandro Urdapilleta, and Julieta Zylberberg.

== Plot ==
At the Hotel Termas, an Argentine hotel in the small town of Rosario de la Frontera, teenage girls and best friends Amalia and Josefina begin to explore their burgeoning sexuality while being fervently Catholic. Amalia lives with her attractive divorced mother, who owns the hotel, and her uncle Freddy. During this time, in Amalia's mind, spiritual and sexual impulses are getting mixed up with each other.

A medical conference converges at the hotel. One day, in the midst of a large crowd watching the performance of a musician playing the theremin, Dr. Jano, a participant in the conference and hotel guest, rubs up sexually against Amalia. She is upset but takes his inappropriate action as a sign that her Catholic faith has given her a mission: to save Dr. Jano from such inappropriate behavior. Afterward, the married middle-aged doctor becomes the object of Amalia's desire and she begins to spy on him. Amalia's story is partly about an adolescent girl's discovery of her sexual vulnerability and the sexual power she possesses.

== Cast ==
- Mercedes Morán as Helena
- Carlos Belloso as Dr. Jano
- Alejandro Urdapilleta as Freddy
- María Alché as Amalia
- Julieta Zylberberg as Josefina
- Mía Maestro as Inés
- Marta Lubos as Mirta
- Arturo Goetz as Dr. Vesalio
- Alejo Mango as Dr. Cuesta
- Mónica Villa as Madre de Josefina
- Leandro Stivelman as Julian
- Manuel Schaller as Thermin Player

== Background ==
Writer and director Lucrecia Martel said, "The film isn't strictly autobiographical, but what I put in it is my personal experience in life, my memories. When I was in my teens, I was a very religious person. I thought I had a special relationship with God, or anything that was up there. Now, I don't believe in miracles, but I do believe in the emotion you feel in front of a miracle - the emotion of something unexpected revealed to you."

Martel used few establishing or transition shots in order to physically separate a space from its moment in the film.

The film was shot entirely in Salta, Argentina, which is Martel's birthplace.

== Release ==
The film first opened in Argentina on 6 May 2004. It was selected for competition and featured internationally at the 2004 Cannes Film Festival on 16 May.

The film was also shown at various film festivals, including: the Karlovy Vary Film Festival, the Toronto International Film Festival, the Helsinki International Film Festival, the London Film Festival, the 47th Hong Kong International Film Festival, and the Reykjavík International Film Festival.

In the United States it premiered at the New York Film Festival on 10 October 2004, and the Seattle International Film Festival on 20 May 2005. Fine Line Features gave it a limited theatrical release on 29 April 2005.

== Critical reception ==
A.O. Scott, film critic for The New York Times, called the film an "elusive, feverish and altogether amazing second feature..." He also liked Martel's artistic directorial approach to films, and wrote, "Her visual style is similarly oblique, as she frames her characters through half-opened doors, at odd angles and in asymmetrical close-ups. To a degree that is sometimes disorienting, Ms. Martel explores the mysteries of the senses. They are our instruments for knowing ourselves, each other and the world, but they also mislead us, bringing pain, pleasure and confusion in equal measure."

Kevin Thomas, critic for the Los Angeles Times, wrote, "[the film] reveals the style, insight and confidence that are the marks of a major director." He also said of director Martel, "[She's] a subtle artist and a sharp observer, Martel manages a large cast with an ease that matches her skill at storytelling, within which psychological insight and social comment flow easily and implicitly."

Film critic Ruthe Stein wrote, "Martel is especially good at capturing a claustrophobic environment, and she wisely leaves ambiguous the question of the doctor's complicity in Amalia's frenzied state. He fails to recognize her when she starts stalking him -- an indication of the randomness of the act done to the accompaniment of a theremin."

The film holds a 77% approval rating at Rotten Tomatoes, based on 62 reviews. The site's critics consensus reads, "This provocative, lyrical drama mixes themes of forbidden sexuality and redemptive faith with a touch of humanism in a memorable, if disorienting, visual style." On Metacritic, it has a weighted average score of 75 out of 100 based on reviews from 22 critics, indicating "generally favorable".

The film was cited by the film director Urška Djukić as an inspiration for her 2025 film, Little Trouble Girls.

== Awards ==
Wins

- Clarin Entertainment Awards: Clarin Award; Best Director, Lucrecia Martel; Best New Film Actress, Julieta Zylberberg; 2004.
- São Paulo International Film Festival: Critics Award, Honorable Mention, Lucrecia Martel; 2004.

Nominations

- Cannes Film Festival: Golden Palm, Lucrecia Martel; 2004.
- Argentine Film Critics Association Awards: Silver Condor; Best Cinematography, Félix Monti; Best Costume Design, Julio Suárez; Best New Actress, María Alche; Best Supporting Actress, Julieta Zylberberg; 2005.

== See also ==
- List of Argentine films of 2004
- List of Spanish films of 2004
