= René Lavand =

Argentine magician

- Born: Héctor René Lavandera; 24 September 1928; Buenos Aires, Argentina
- Died: 7 February 2015 (aged 86); Tandil, Buenos Aires Province, Argentina
- Occupation: Magician
- Years active: 1960–2015
- Known for: One-handed card tricks

Héctor René Lavandera (24 September 1928 – 7 February 2015), known as René Lavand, was an Argentine magician, specializing in close-up magic. He was notable for performing card tricks with only one hand.

== Biography ==
Lavand was born in Buenos Aires in 1928. After losing his right hand (he was right-handed) at the age of nine in a car crash, Lavand slowly taught himself card manipulation, later stating, "I went through hard times, but I got an advantage, I couldn't copy anyone's techniques." After working as a cashier in a bank, at the age of 32 he appeared in Buenos Aires' Tabarís Theater, following which his career took off, leading to world tours.

In the United States, Lavand appeared on Ed Sullivan's and Johnny Carson's television shows and performed in shows at the Magic Castle in Hollywood. The catchphrase he used for one of his most celebrated tricks was "No se puede hacer más lento" (Spanish for "it cannot be done any slower"), referencing the measured and slow pace of his performances.

In between international tours he resided in Tandil, Argentina, and adapted a railway carriage into a magic saloon where he taught the art of illusion. He also co-wrote (with Richard J. Kaufman) the book Mysteries of My Life. The book is an autobiography as well as an instructional book on his magic. He received several honors from the Academy of Magical Arts: Close-up Magician of the Year (1993), Performing Fellowship (1997), and Masters Fellowship (2011).

Lavand died of pneumonia at Nueva Clínica Chacabuco in Tandil in 2015, aged 86.

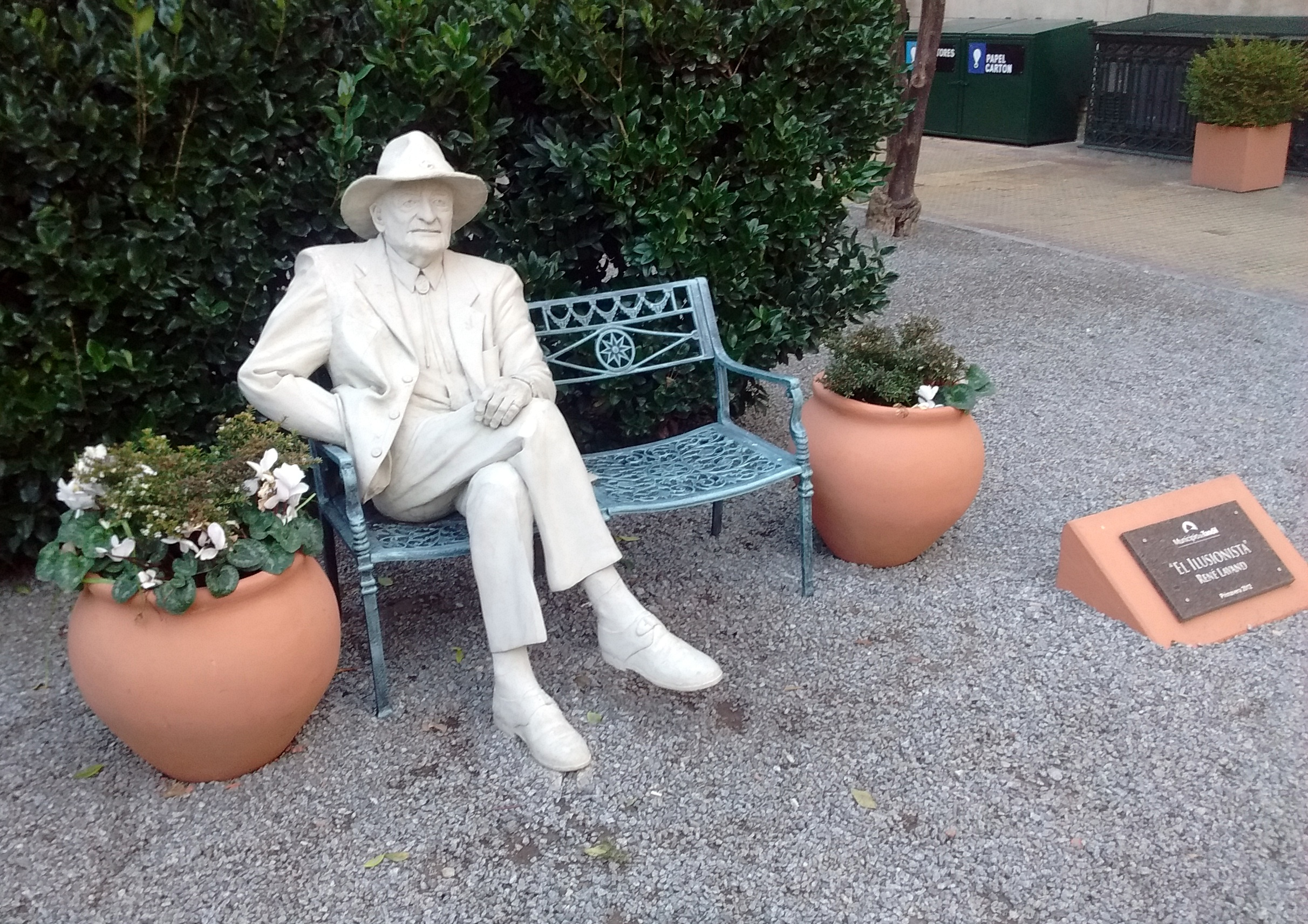
Statue of René Lavand in the city of Tandil (Argentina).

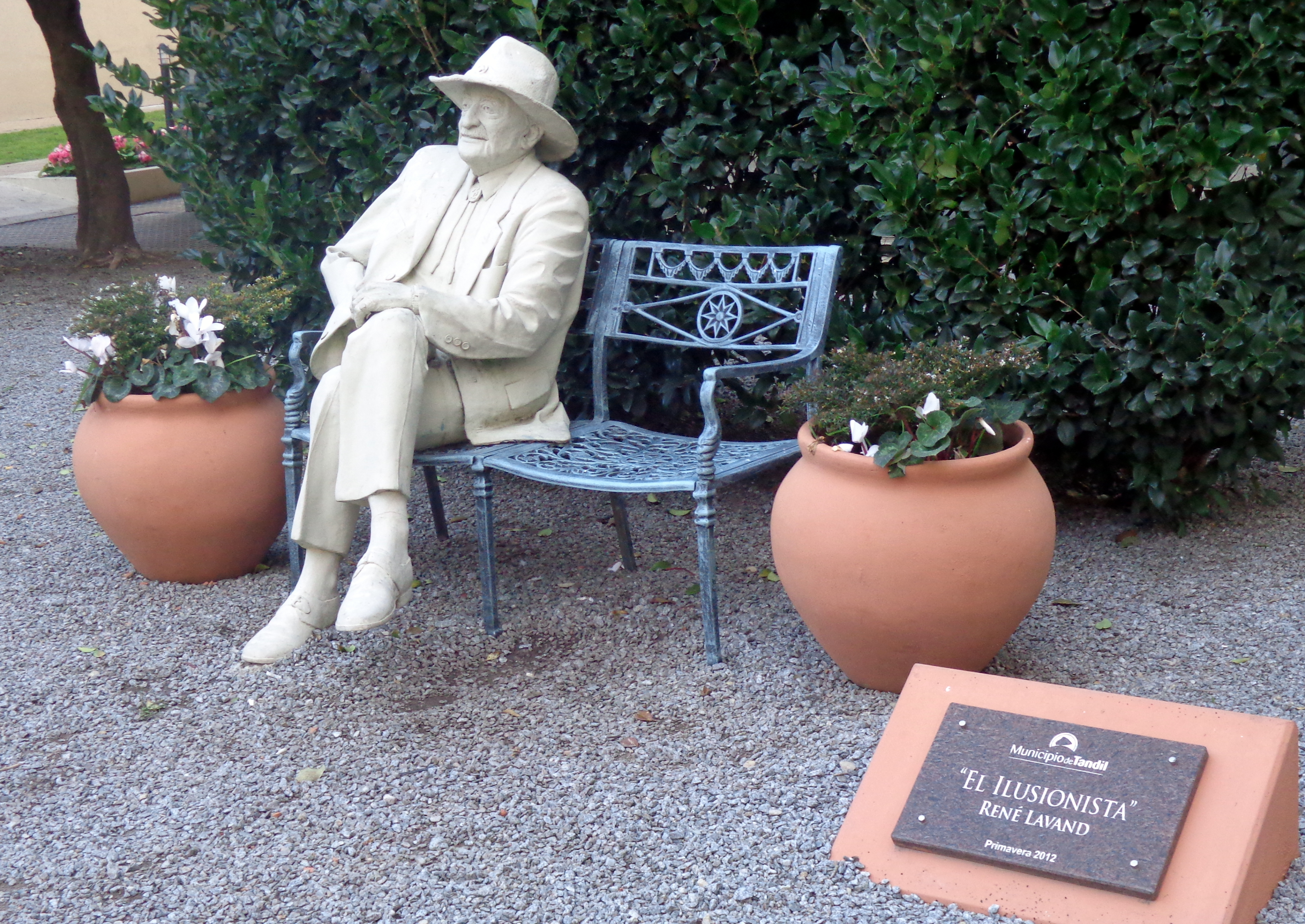
Located on Paseo Intendente Martínez

== Selected filmography ==
- Un oso rojo ("A Red Bear"), directed by Adrian Caetano (2002): plays 'El Turco'
- El Gran Simulador ("The Great Pretender"), directed by Néstor Frenkel (2013): biographical film with performance excerpts and interviews with Lavand at his home

== Books ==
- René Lavand: Slow motion magic I (1988)
- René Lavand: Slow motion magic II (1991)
- René Lavand: Magic from the Soul (1993)
- Mysteries of My Life (1998), with Richard Kaufman
