= Freddy Flores =

Argentine film actor

Freddy Waldo Flores García is a film actor. He works in the cinema of Argentina.

== Filmography ==
- Bolivia (2001)
- Un Oso rojo (2002)
- Tenemos un problema, Ernesto (2014)
- Tríada (2016)

== Award nomination ==
- Argentine Film Critics Association Awards: Silver Condor; Best New Actor for Bolivia; 2001.
