= Julián Apezteguia =

Argentine film cinematographer

- Born: March 3, 1974 (age 52); Buenos Aires
- Citizenship: Argentina
- Occupation: Cinematographer

Julián Apezteguia (born March 3, 1974, in Buenos Aires) is an Argentine film cinematographer. Three of his most recent films have been critically well received: Bolivia (2001), 18-j (2004), and Crónica de una fuga (2006).

== Filmography ==
- La Expresión del deseo (1998)
- Lobos marinos (2000)
- 18 cambios (2000)
- Bolivia (2001)
- Zapada, una comedia beat (2002)
- La Felicidad (Un día de campo) (2002)
- 18-j (2004)
- Después del mar (2005)
- Crónica de una fuga (2006) a.k.a. Chronicle of an Escape
- 27 Nights (2025)

== Television ==
- Tumberos (2002) (mini) TV Series a.k.a. Tombers
- Disputas (2003) (mini) TV Series a.k.a. Catfight
