= Un oso rojo =

- Theatrical release poster
- Directed by: Israel Adrián Caetano
- Screenplay by: Israel Adrián Caetano; Graciela Speranza
- Story by: Romina Lafranchini
- Produced by: Lita Stantic
- Starring: Julio Chávez; Soledad Villamil; Luis Machín; Agostina Lage
- Cinematography: Willi Behnisch
- Edited by: Santiago Ricci
- Music by: Mariano Barrella; Diego Grimblat
- Production company: Lita Stantic Producciones
- Distributed by: Alfa Films (Argentina); Ad Vitam Distribution (France); Wanda Visión (Spain); Distribution Company Sudamericana (overseas)
- Release date: October 3, 2002 (Argentina)
- Running time: 95 minutes
- Countries: Argentina; France; Spain
- Language: Spanish

Un oso rojo ("Red Bear" or "A Red Bear") is a 2002 Argentine, Spanish, and French neo-Western action drama film directed by Israel Adrián Caetano.

The film was produced by Lita Stantic, and the screenplay was written by Caetano and Graciela Speranza, from the story penned by Romina Lafranchini. The picture features Julio Chávez, Soledad Villamil, Luis Machín, and Agostina Lage, among others.

In a survey of the 100 greatest films of Argentine cinema carried out by the Museo del Cine Pablo Ducrós Hicken in 2000, the film reached the 38th position.

== Plot ==
Oso (Julio Chávez) is sent to prison for a robbery and a murder. After seven years, he is released from prison, and in a flashback, the robbery is seen that led to his arrest. His daughter, Alicia (Agostina Lage), was a year old on the day of the robbery. As a consequence, Alicia never got a chance to get to know her father.

Oso returns to his hometown, a depressed suburb of Buenos Aires, fully aware that his wife, Natalia (Soledad Villamil), is living with another man, Sergio (Luis Machín). Oso is determined to establish a relationship with Alicia, and to collect money owed him by a sleazy crime boss known as the Turkish (René Lavand). In the meantime, the Turkish wants Oso to be the getaway driver on one last big job. For her part, Alicia seems fascinated with her father and makes him promise never to go away again.

== Cast ==
- Julio Chávez as Rubén (Oso)
- Soledad Villamil as Natalia
- Luis Machín as Sergio
- Agostina Lage as Alicia
- Enrique Liporace as Güemes
- René Lavand as Turco
- Daniel Valenzuela as Alfarito
- Freddy Flores as Truck
- Marcos Martínez as Ramón

== Distribution ==
The film was first featured at the Cannes Film Festival on May 23, 2002. It opened in Argentina on October 3, 2002, making the picture Caetano's second film that opened in Argentina in 2002 (the last was Bolivia in April).

The film was also shown at various film festivals, including: the Gothenburg Film Festival, Sweden; the Havana Film Festival, Cuba; the Latin America Film Festival, Poland; the Lleida Latin-American Film Festival, Spain; the Cartagena Film Festival, Colombia; the Film by the Sea Film Festival, Netherlands; and the Helsinki International Film Festival, Finland.

In the United States, the picture opened at the Sundance Film Festival on January 17, 2003. It also screened at the New Directors/New Films Festival, New York City in March 2003, and the Milwaukee International Film Festival and Los Angeles in October 2004.

== Critical reception ==
Film critic Neil Young thought the film was an engaging mix of crime thriller and family drama, and wrote, "[The film] is nevertheless an effective, if minor, foray into a dusty, neglected corner of modern-day Buenos Aires. We can feel Argentina's well-documented financial problems starting to sour the whole country's atmosphere, exerting unbearable pressures on the likes of Sergio, Oso and Natalia." Young also thought director Caetano elicited solid work from his actors.

A.O. Scott, film critic for The New York Times, also liked the film and wrote, "Its combination of toughness and smooth, understated style makes it touching and absorbing..."

And journalist Diego Batlle, who writes for the Argentine daily La Nación wrote, "Un oso rojo imposes itself as a piece of great dramatic power that ratifies a prolific director's narrative talent."

== Awards ==
Wins

- Argentine Film Critics Association Awards : Silver Condor Award; Best Actor, Julio Chávez; 2003
- Lleida Latin-American Film Festival : Best Actor, Julio Chávez; 2003
- Havana Film Festival : Best Music, Diego Grimblat; Special Jury Prize, Adrián Caetano; Special Mention, Lita Stantic; 2002

Nominations

- Cartagena Film Festival : Golden India Catalina; Best Film, Adrián Caetano; 2004
- Argentine Film Critics Association Awards: Silver Condor Award; Best Actress, Soledad Villamil; Best Art Direction, Graciela Oderigo; Best Cinematography, Willi Behnisch; Best Director, Adrián Caetano; Best Editing, Santiago Ricci; Best Film; Best Music, Diego Grimblat; Best New Actor, René Lavand; Best New Actress, Agostina Lage; Best Original Screenplay, Adrián Caetano and Gabriela Speranza; Best Sound, Marcos De Aguirre; 2003
