= Cinema Tropical =

U.S. non-profit organization

Cinema Tropical is a 501(c)(3) non-profit organization dedicated to the distribution, programming and promotion of South American and Latino cinema in the United States.

The non-profit company was co-founded by Carlos A. Gutiérrez and Monika Wagenberg in 2001.

The company serves as a distributor and acquires Latin American films and helps its directors and producers gain national exposure in theaters, institutions, and film festivals.

It also curates special series and retrospectives for theaters, institutions, and film festivals.

== The Cinema Tropical Film Series ==
The Cinema Tropical Film Series features one recent South American or Latin American film every month at venues throughout the United States. As of February 2007 the series travels to 12 highly prominent theatres and cultural institutions. The series is currently divided among the following three regions:

The Cinema Tropical Series New York:

- Cinema Village (Manhattan)
- American Museum of Moving Image (Queens)
- Brooklyn Academy of Music (Brooklyn)
- Cinema Arts Centre (Long Island)
- Jacob Burns Film Center (Westchester)
- Cornell Cinema (Ithaca, NY)

The Cinema Tropical Series East:

- The Tower Theatre (Miami, FL)
- The Museum of Fine Arts (Boston, MA)
- Wadsworth Museum of Art (Hartford, CT)
- International House (Philadelphia, PA)
- Avon Theatre (Stamford, CT)

The Cinema Tropical Series Midwest/West:

- The Wexner Center for the Arts (Columbus, OH)
- Northwest Film Center (Portland, Oregon)
- The Facets Cinémathèque (Chicago, IL)
- Loft Cinema (Tucson, AZ)

== Distributor filmography ==
- Bolivia (2001)
- 25 Watts (2001)
- La Tropical (2002)
- Los Archivos privados de Pablo Escobar (2002)
- A Red Bear (2002)
- El Carro (2003)
- Suite Habana (2003)
- Los Guantes mágicos (2003)
- Dependencia sexual (2003)
- Más allá del mar (2003)
- El Perro (2004)
- Días de Santiago (2004)
- Al otro lado (2005)
- Hermanas (2005)
- Toro negro (2005)
- Soy Cuba, O Mamute Siberiano (2005)
