= La ciénaga (film) =

2001 film by Lucrecia Martel

- Theatrical release poster
- Directed by: Lucrecia Martel
- Written by: Lucrecia Martel
- Produced by: Lita Stantic
- Starring: Graciela Borges; Mercedes Morán; Martín Adjemián; Daniel Valenzuela
- Cinematography: Hugo Colace
- Edited by: Santiago Ricci
- Production company: Wanda Visiòn S.A.
- Distributed by: Lider Films
- Release dates: 8 February 2001 (Berlinale); 12 April 2001 (Argentina); 28 September 2001 (Spain); 9 January 2002 (France)
- Running time: 100 minutes
- Countries: Argentina; Spain; France
- Language: Spanish
- Box office: $103,215

La ciénaga (Spanish: [la ˈsjenaɣa]; lit. 'The swamp') is a 2001 drama film written and directed by Lucrecia Martel in her feature directorial debut. The film stars an ensemble cast featuring Graciela Borges, Mercedes Morán, Martín Adjemián and Daniel Valenzuela.

The film is set in the high plains of northwestern Argentina and portrays the life of a self-pitying Argentine bourgeois family. It has received critical acclaim.

In 2022, it was selected as the greatest film of Argentine cinema in a poll organized by the specialized magazines La vida útil, Taipei and La tierra quema, which was presented at the Mar del Plata International Film Festival. Also in 2022, the film was included in Spanish magazine Fotogramas's list of the 20 best Argentine films of all time.

== Plot ==
To escape the heat, Mecha, a middle-aged woman, spends summers at her decaying country estate, La Mandrágora, with her husband Gregorio and their children in Salta. By a pool, Mecha and Gregorio sunbathe and drink wine. Meanwhile, Momi and Verónica, two of Mecha's daughters, lounge on a bed inside the house. Momi tells Verónica that Mecha plans to fire Isabel, one of Mecha's Amerindian servants, because she thinks Isabel is stealing her towels. Mecha drunkenly falls and injures herself, and is driven to a nearby doctor for immediate medical care.

In a modest townhouse, Mecha's cousin Tali and her husband Rafael are informed about her injury. After a doctor treats their son Luciano's injury, they drive to La Mandrágora. While Mecha is recovering from her injuries, her family watches news reports about local Argentines seeing apparitions of the Virgin Mary on rooftops.

When they arrive, Luciano joins his cousin Joaquín in a hunting expedition in the nearby hills. With her injuries bandaged, Mecha stays in bed. She and Tali discuss their latest family developments, including plans to go school shopping in Bolivia. Luciano has an extra tooth they want to have a dentist treat. Joaquín has an injured eye, which Mecha plans to have a doctor treat with a glass eye.

Later that night, Rafael and Tali discuss the whereabouts of their travel papers for their trip to Bolivia. Rafael questions the need for the trip when they can shop locally. At a nearby dance club, Mecha's son José gets into a fight with Isabel's boyfriend and returns home injured.

The next morning, several family members travel to a nearby dam. At the estate, Mecha answers a phone call from Mercedes, who calls for José for information about their customs papers. Still injured from the previous night, José lies in bed, unable to answer the phone. Mercedes says she will be arriving. After a family dinner, he returns her call and says he will be traveling to Buenos Aires. After a few days, Mercedes cancels her trip to the estate.

Tali returns home to her apartment with her children. There, she cancels their trip to Bolivia, as her husband had purchased the school supplies without her knowledge. Shortly after, Isabel tells Mecha that she plans to leave to be with her sisters. Upset that she was not informed sooner, Mecha calls her selfish and ungrateful. This upsets Isabel, who packs her belongings and leaves.

In Buenos Aires, José is with Mercedes. Luciano climbs a ladder to look at the neighbor's dog but falls and is left unattended to. Momi returns to the estate and Verónica asks her where she has been. Momi says she went where the Virgin Mary has been appearing, but didn't see anything.

== Cast ==
- Graciela Borges as Mecha
- Mercedes Morán as Tali
- Martín Adjemián as Gregorio
- Daniel Valenzuela as Rafael
- Leonora Balcarce as Verónica
- Silvia Baylé as Mercedes
- Sofia Bertolotto as Momi
- Juan Cruz Bordeu as José
- Noelia Bravo Herrera as Agustina
- Maria Micol Ellero as Mariana
- Andrea López as Isabel
- Sebastián Montagna as Luciano
- Franco Veneranda as Martín
- Fabio Villafane as Perro
- Diego Baenas as Joaquín

== Background ==
Lucrecia Martel's screenplay for the film won the Sundance Institute/NHK Award in 1999; this award honors and supports emerging independent filmmakers. The jury suggested she rewrite the script to follow a more traditional structure around one or two protagonists, but she chose to retain its diffuse nature.

Martel has said in interviews that the story is based on "memories of her own family." She has also said: "I know what kind of film I've made. Not a very easy one! For me, it's not a realistic film. It's something strange, a little weird. It's the kind of film where you can't tell what's going to happen, and I wanted the audience to be very uncomfortable from the beginning."

== Production ==
To find the child actors for the film, Martel held 2,400 auditions, 1,600 of which she recorded on video in a garage near her home in Salta, Argentina.

Of casting Mecha and Tali, Martel said: "in Salta I didn't find what I was looking for and, instead, I saw a television programme showed to me by a woman friend who knew what I was looking for. Graciela Borges was in it and I realized I had found my character. Mercedes Morán was more difficult because someone I had very much in mind inspired that character. Besides, the character Mercedes played in Gasoleros distracted me, due to the naturalistic language television has, which is the least natural in the world. But I saw her at some point in a magazine in some photographs they had taken of her with her daughter, on holiday, and there, away from the character in Gasoleros, I realized she was the only one for my film, as Lita Stantic had already suggested."

La ciénaga was shot entirely in Martel's hometown of Salta.

== Distribution ==
La ciénaga premiered at the Berlin International Film Festival on 8 February 2001. It opened in Argentina on 8 March at the Mar del Plata Film Festival, and received a wide release in Argentina on 12 April.

The film had a long film festival run, including the Karlovy Vary Film Festival; the Toronto International Film Festival; the Warsaw Film Festival; International Film Festival, Rotterdam; the Titanic International Filmpresence Festival, Hungary; the Adelaide International Film Festival; the Uruguay International Film Festival; and the Havana Film Festival. It played at the New York Film Festival on 2 October 2001 and opened in Los Angeles on 12 October.

The company Energia is the film's sales agent.

== Critical reception ==
Review aggregator Rotten Tomatoes reports that 88% of critics gave the film a positive review, based on 43 reviews, with an average rating of 6.90/10. The site's consensus reads: "Dense yet impressively focused, La Cienaga is a disquieting look at domestic dissatisfaction - and a powerful calling card for debuting writer-director Lucrecia Martel." On Metacritic, it has a score of 75 out of 100, based on 18 reviews, indicating "generally positive reviews".

In The New York Times, Stephen Holden called the film "remarkable", writing, "The steamy ambiance in which the characters fester is a metaphor for creeping social decay...La ciénaga perspires from the screen, it creates a vision of social malaise that feels paradoxically familiar and new." Critic David Lipfert also liked Martel's various sociological messages and metaphors, and said he believed the "New Argentina Cinema" was moving beyond the themes related to the military dictatorship period of the late 1970s and early 1980s. He wrote: "[Martel's] intense, in-your-face portrait of a dissolute middle class lacks the usual justifying criminal context. Martel simply holds up a mirror to Argentine society, and the result is devastating. Instead of creating an allegory with archetypes, she shows characters that are all too real. When still, her camera is low and close as though we were right on top of the actors."

When the film opened in New York City, Amy Taubin of The Village Voice wrote: "Martel's La ciénaga is a veritable Chekhov tragicomedy of provincial life. Making a brilliant debut, Martel constructs her narrative from quotidian incidents, myriad comings and goings, and a cacophony of voices competing for attention...[i]n a debut feature that's assured in every aspect, Martel's direction of the younger members of her cast is particularly notable."

== Awards ==
Wins

- Berlin International Film Festival: Alfred Bauer Prize, Lucrecia Martel; 2001.
- Havana Film Festival: Best Actress, Graciela Borges; Best Director, Lucrecia Martel; Best Sound, Hervé Guyader, Emmanuel Croset, Guido Berenblum, Adrián De Michele; Grand Coral - First Prize, Lucrecia Martel; 2001.
- Toulouse Latin America Film Festival: French Critics' Discovery Award, Lucrecia Martel; Grand Prix, Lucrecia Martel; 2001.
- Uruguay International Film Festival: First Work Award - Special Mention, Lucrecia Martel; 2001.
- Uruguayan Film Critics Association: UFCA Award Best Latin American Film; 2001.
- Argentine Film Critics Association Awards: Silver Condor; Best Actress, Graciela Borges; Best Cinematography, Hugo Colace; Best First Film, Lucrecia Martel; 2002.

Nominations

- Berlin International Film Festival: Golden Berlin Bear, Lucrecia Martel; 2001.
- Argentine Film Critics Association Awards: Silver Condor; Best Art Direction, Graciela Oderigo; Best Director, Lucrecia Martel; Best Film; Best Original Screenplay, Lucrecia Martel; Best Supporting Actress, Mercedes Morán; 2002.
- MTV Movie Awards, Latin America: MTV Movie Award, MTV South Feed (mostly Argentina) - Favorite Film, Lucrecia Martel; 2002.
