= Daniel Valenzuela (actor) =

Argentine actor

Daniel Valenzuela (born May 5, 1956, in Misiones, Argentina), is a film and television actor. He has also done some screenplay writing. He works in the cinema of Argentina.

Three of his most recent roles were in critically acclaimed films: La Ciénaga (2001), A Red Bear (2002), and Chronicle of an Escape (2006).

== Filmography (partial) ==
- Mala época (1998)
- Antigua vida mía (2001) a.k.a. Antigua, My Life
- La Ciénaga (2001) a.k.a. The Swamp
- El Juego de la silla (2002) a.k.a. Musical Chairs
- Dibu 3 (2002)
- Un Oso Rojo (2002) a.k.a. A Red Bear
- Vivir Intentando (2003)
- El Fondo del Mar (2003) a.k.a. The Bottom of the Sea
- Buenos Aires 100 kilómetros (2004)
- Navidad en el placard (2004)
- Tiempo de valientes (2005)
- Nordeste (2005)
- El Boquete (2006)
- Crónica de una fuga (2006) a.k.a. Chronicle of an Escape

== Television (partial) ==
- Tumberos (2002) (Mini TV Series) a.k.a. Tombers
- Ventdelplà (1 episode, 2006)

== Screenplays ==
- El Bonaerense (2002)
- Fué (2006)
