= Marcos Martínez (actor) =

Argentine actor

- Born: 24 August 1977 (age 48); Oberá, Argentina
- Occupation: Actor
- Years active: 2000–present

Marcos Moreno Martínez (born 24 August 1977) is an Argentine actor and comedian, mostly active in stage and on television.

== Early life ==
Martínez was born in Oberá, Misiones Province, Argentina, on 24 August 1977. When he was 2 years old, he moved with his family to Luján, Buenos Aires. In Buenos Aires he studied dramatic arts at the Escuela Metropolitana de Arte Dramático (EMAD), graduating in 1999. In 2013, he further completed a technician's degree on cultural administration. Martínez is also a percussionist.

Before reaching success in acting roles, he worked as a taxi driver to make ends meet.

== Career ==
In 2000, Martínez had his film debut in the short film Íconos. He also had minor roles in Tumberos and Un oso rojo in 2002. He also had a minor role in the 2009 telenovela Botineras.

In 2019 he formed Les Limones, a family-oriented music band; Martínez plays the cajón peruano, the bombo legüero, timbaletas and bongos.

=== Omar Obaca ===
In 2010, he was hired by satirical magazine NAH! to promote online streaming channel FWTV. As part of the marketing strategy devised by FWTV, Martínez starred in a series of satirical videos ahead of the 2015 general election in the role of "Omar Obaca", a fake presidential candidate whose name and presentation parodied Barack Obama. In the skits, Obaca makes a number of impossible promises, such as using government funds to make Lionel Messi return to play in Argentina, making Argentina an economic powerhouse by stealing from the United States Federal Reserve, paying Argentina's national debt to China with caramel candy; and reducing crime by having "everyone dress up as the police".

In total, Martínez starred in 30 short clips released on social media. The videos went viral and were extensively shared, reaching up to 7 million views on YouTube. Obaca's popularity led the marketing company to double down by plastering fake campaign posters across the Greater Buenos Aires with comedic slogans, such as "vote black" (a quip on blank vote, as "blank" and "white" are the same word in Spanish), and calling on voters to back "the first black president of Argentina".

The Obaca campaign was discussed by mainstream media in Argentina and received international attention. Among Afro-Argentine circles, the character received mixed responses; Afro-Argentine activist groups condemned the character as a reproduction of harmful stereotypes. Martínez, on the other hand, defended his character contending that there were "much worse things" than a black politician in a suit who is broadly admired.

Despite being a fictional candidate and his name not being on any ballots come election day, he received a number of write-in votes at the PASO primaries in August 2015.

Martínez continued to perform as Obaca after the elections, such as during Barack Obama's 2016 state visit to Argentina, when he stood in vigil outside Ezeiza Airport waiting for the US president to arrive.

== Personal life ==
Martínez has two children, a son and a daughter.

== Filmography ==
Year	Title	Role	Notes
2000	Íconos		Short film
2002	Un oso rojo	Ramón	
2007	¿De quién es el portaligas?	El Puma	
2014	El Encuentro de Guayaquil		
