= Raúl Apold =

Argentine politician

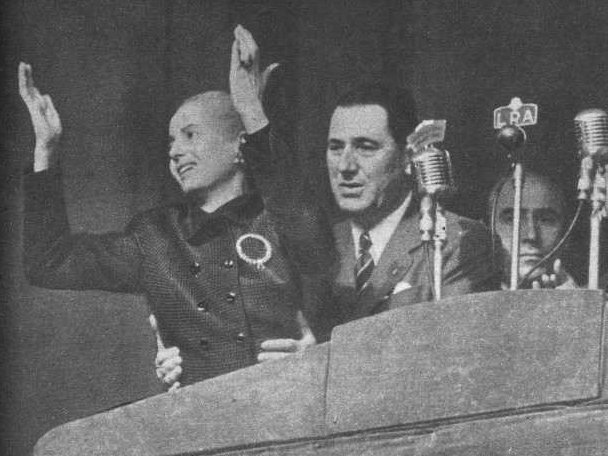
Evita and Juan Perón at the Plaza de Mayo, 1952. Raul Apold is visible behind Peron.

Raúl Alejandro Apold (1898-1980) was the propaganda chief for Juan Domingo Perón.

As a close associate of Eva Perón, Apold was an official with the General Confederation of Labor.

== Bibliography ==
- Mercado, Silvia (2013). El inventor del peronismo (in Spanish). Buenos Aires: Planeta.
