= Loco Fever =

2001 film by Andrés Wood

- Chilean theatrical release poster
- Spanish: La fiebre del loco
- Directed by: Andrés Wood
- Written by: René Arcos; Gilberto Villaroel
- Produced by: Rosa Bosch; Bertha Navarro
- Starring: Emilio Bardi; Luis Dubó
- Cinematography: Miguel Ioann Littin Menz
- Music by: Diego Las Heras; Jeanette Paulin
- Release date: October 2001
- Running time: 94 minutes
- Country: Chile
- Language: Spanish

Loco Fever (Spanish: La fiebre del loco) is a 2001 Chilean comedy film directed by Andres Wood. The film's tagline was "Amor y avaricia en un mundo de buzos y moluscos" (Spanish for: Love and greed in a world of scuba and mollusks).

== Plot ==
The film centers on the conflicts between visiting prostitutes and fishermen's wives in a small fishing village in rural Southern Chile. The village has become obsessed with Chilean abalone (known as "loco" in Spanish, which has a dual meaning of both abalone and craziness). Chaos erupts when the Chilean government temporarily lifts the ban on the collection of this prized mollusk, which is believed to have aphrodisiacal effects.

== Cast ==
- Emilio Bardi - Canuto
- Luis Dubó - Jorge
- Loreto Moyo - Sonia
- Luis Margani - Padre Luis (Father Luis)
- Tamara Acosta - Nelly
- María Izquierdo - Leila
- Mariana Loyola - Paty
- Patricia López (credited as Patricia López Menadier) - Isabel
- Carmina Riego
- Pilar Zderich - Denisse
- Aldo Parodi
- Julio Marcone - Yukio
- Cristián Chaparro
- Gabriela Medina
- Carmen Barros
- Marcela Arroyave
- Claudia Hidalgo
- Chamila Rodríguez
- Pablo Striano
- Camila Videla

== Technical information ==
Realization and demonstration, on October 29, 2001, of the first digital cinema transmission by satellite in Europe of a feature film (La Fiebre del Loco) by Bernard Pauchon, Alain Lorentz, Raymond Melwig and Philippe Binant.
