= Iván de Pineda =

Argentine fashion model, actor and TV host (born 1977)

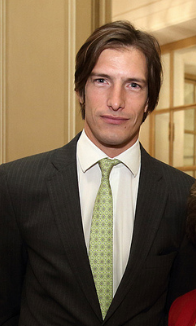
- Born: July 11, 1977 (age 48); Madrid, Spain
- Occupations: Model, actor
- Years active: 1995–present
- Awards: Silver Condor for Best New Actor (2008)

Iván de Pineda (born 11 July 1977) is an Argentine-Spanish international fashion model, film actor and TV host. He has modelled in New York City, London and Milan. de Pineda was born in Madrid to a Spanish father and an Argentine mother. He and his mother moved to Argentina after his father's death when he was a child.

De Pineda began to model at age 17, and would later represent labels such as YSL, Chanel, Diesel, DKNY, Kenzo, Moschino, and Versace. He made his television debut in the 2000 series Calientes playing the character of Nacho, and in 2005 debuted on Argentine cinema; his 2007 film Cuando ella saltó garnered him a Best New Actor award at the 2008 Silver Condor awards.

Nowadays, he is in a TV programme called "Pasapalabra" in Argentina.

== Filmography ==
- Calientes (2000) TV series as Nacho
- Un Buda (2005) as Carlos
- Cuando ella saltó (2007) as Ramiro
- Las hermanas L (2008) as novio francés
- Paco - pre-production (2009)
- Eva y Lola (2010) as Iván
