= Adrián Caetano =

Uruguayan-Argentine film director

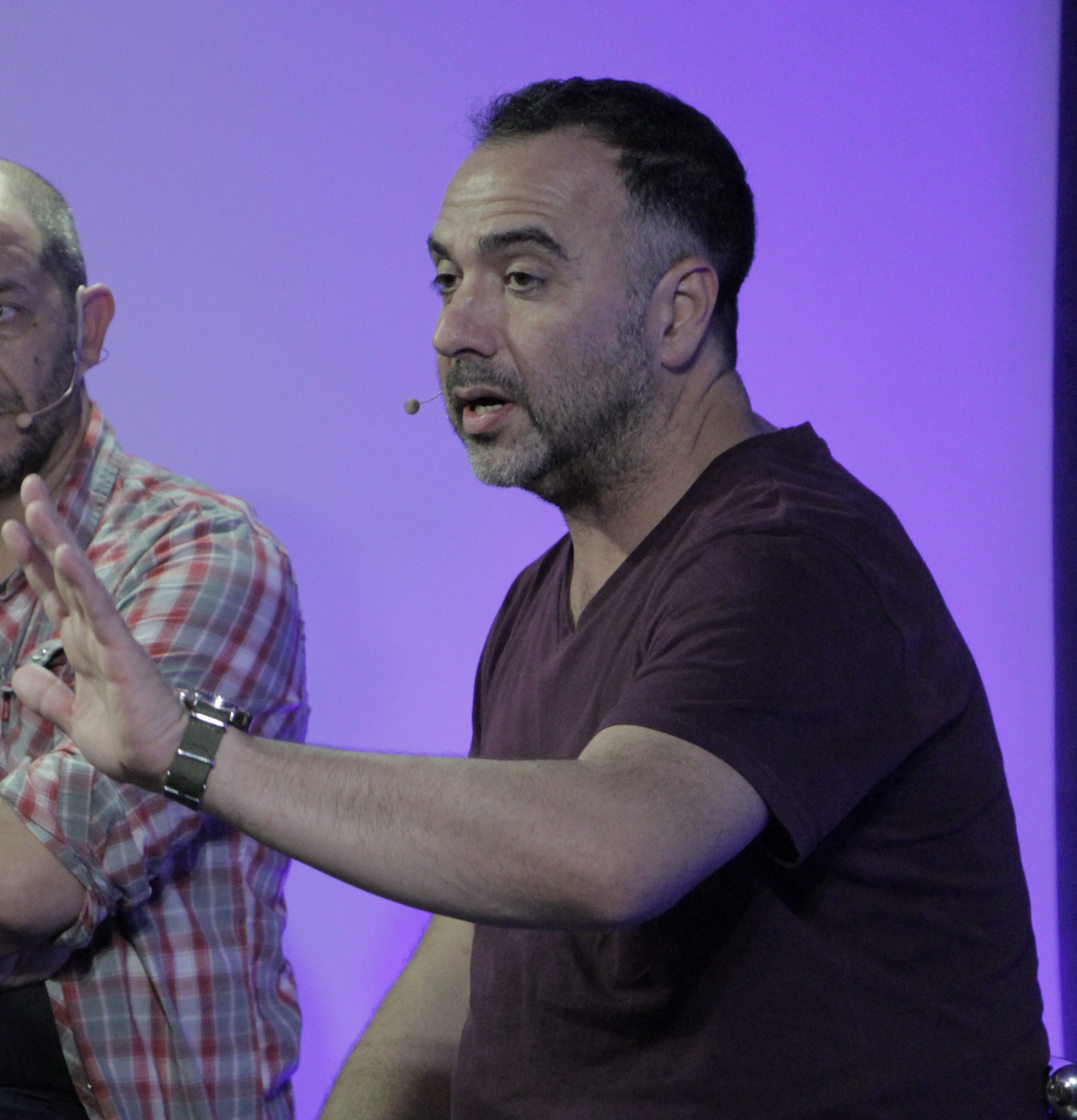
- Born: Israel Adrián Caetano; 1969 (age 56–57); Montevideo, Uruguay
- Occupations: film director, producer, screenwriter

Israel Adrián Caetano (born 1969 in Montevideo, Uruguay), known as Adrián Caetano, is a Uruguayan film director, producer and screenwriter.

== Biography ==
He's often credited as Adrián Caetano. He works mainly in the cinema of Argentina and at times, he obtains funding for his films in Europe. He lives in Buenos Aires, Argentina.

At age of sixteen, his family moved to Córdoba, Argentina. When he was older, he shot several short videos including Visite Carlos Paz, and Calafate.

In 1995, Caetano won a prize in a script contest he entered. The money won allowed him to film the short Down Hill (Cuesta abajo), his first work filmed in 35mm. Pizza, Beer, and Cigarettes (1998, co-directed with Bruno Stagnaro) followed. The film was well received at the various film festivals where it screened.

In 1996, Caetano won a Media Arts Fellowship, funded by the Rockefeller Foundation in New York City.

Caetano also directs television commercial and programs.

In 2005, Caetano returned to Uruguay to shoot the mini-series Uruguayos Campeones for television.

== New Argentine cinema ==
Film critic Manohla Dargis, writing for the Los Angeles Times, calls Caetano "a leading figure in the new Argentine cinema." She notes that Caetano's first feature, the 1998 release of Pizza, Beer, Cigarettes, helped jump-start a "New Argentine Cinema."

His first full-length film, Bolivia (2001) was well received by film critics, even though it took three years to produce the film due to budget constraints.

His film Chronicle of an Escape, the true story of four men who narrowly escaped death at the hands of Argentina's military death squads during the 1970s, was released in 2006. The film was a major box office success in Argentina, and was screened at the 2006 Cannes Film Festival and the Toronto International Film Festival. It has won and been nominated for numerous awards.

== Filmography ==
- Visite Carlos Paz (1992) (short video)
- Calafate (1994) (short video)
- Cuesta abajo (1995) (first 35mm short film), a.k.a. Down Hill
- Pizza, birra, faso Junto aLa Doblada "vamos a bailar un poco"

(1998) a.k.a. Pizza, Beer, and Cigarettes (co-directed)

- La Expresión del deseo (1998) (16mm mid-length film), a.k.a. The Plaza: The Expression of Desire
- No necesitamos de nadie (1999) (16mm B&W short)
- Historias de Argentina en vivo (2001)
- Bolivia (2001)
- Un oso rojo (2002), a.k.a. A Red Bear
- 18-j (2004)
- Después del mar (2005)
- Crónica de una fuga (2006), a.k.a. Chronicle of an Escape
- Francia (2009)
- Mala (2013)
- El otro hermano (2017)
- Togo (2022)

== Television ==
- Peces chicos (1999) (documentary)
- La Cautiva (2001) (digital beta)
- Tumberos (2002) (mini series), a.k.a. Tombers
- Disputas (2003) (mini series), a.k.a. Catfight
- Uruguayos Campeones (2005) (mini series)
- Lo que el tiempo nos dejó (2010)

== Awards ==
Wins

- Clarin Entertainment Awards: Best Director, Best Screenplay, Best Film, for Crónica de una fuga, 2006.
- Argentine Film Critics Association Awards: Silver Condor; Best Screenplay, Adapted, Israel Adrián Caetano, 2003.
- Rotterdam International Film Festival: KNF Award, Israel Adrián Caetano, for Bolivia, 2002.
- Havana Film Festival: Special Jury Prize, A Red Bear, 2002.
- Cannes Film Festival: Young Critics Award Best Feature, Israel Adrián Caetano, for Bolivia, 2001.
- London Film Festival: FIPRESCI Prize, Israel Adrián Caetano, for its direct, sentimental treatment of one of the most important social questions facing urban societies everywhere, for Bolivia, 2001.
- Donostia-San Sebastián International Film Festival: Made in Spanish Award, Israel Adrián Caetano, for Bolivia, 2001.
- Argentine Film Critics Association Awards: Silver Condor, Best First Film, for Pizza, birra, faso, 1999.
- Fribourg International Film Festival: FIPRESCI Prize, Israel Adrián Caetano and Bruno Stagnaro, for a first feature by two young directors who dramatise with force and without sentimentality the predicament of the teenage marginals of Argentina; and Grand Prix, for Pizza, birra, faso, 1998.
- Gramado Film Festival: Golden Kikito, Best Director, Best Film, Best Screenplay, for Pizza, birra, faso 1998. Shared with Bruno Stagnaro.
