= National Institute of Cinema and Audiovisual Arts =

Argentine film organization

Instituto Nacional de Cine y Artes Audiovisuales

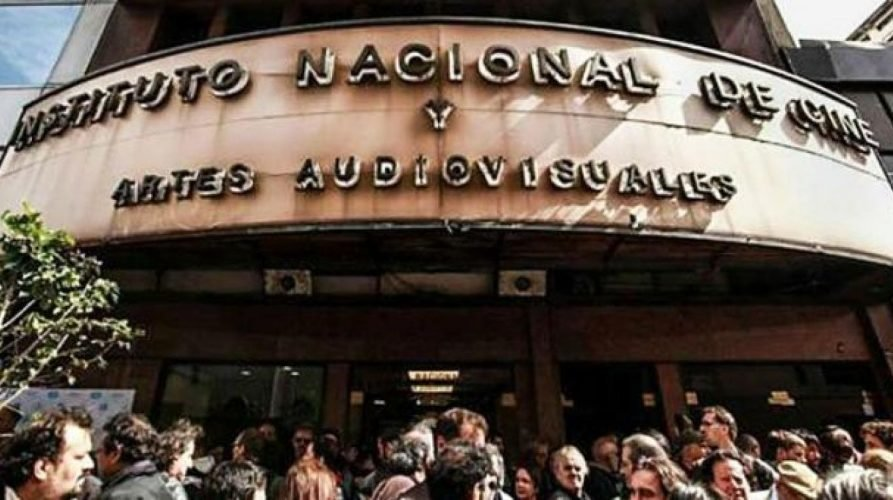
- Formation: May 14, 1968; 58 years ago
- Founder: Government of Argentina
- Location: Lima 319, Monserrat, Buenos Aires

The National Institute of Cinema and Audiovisual Arts (Spanish: Instituto Nacional de Cine y Artes Audiovisuales, INCAA; also referred to as the Argentine National Film Board) is an agency of the Government of Argentina. It promotes the Argentine film industry by funding qualified Argentine film production companies and supporting new filmmakers. The Institute was established on 14 May 1968 by law nº 17.741. The INCAA also organizes the Mar del Plata International Film Festival, Ventana Sur film market, and has its own film school called ENERC.

== Ratings ==
Through its Advisory Commission of Cinematographic Exhibition (Comisión Asesora de Exhibición Cinematográfica) the National Institute of Cinema and Audiovisual Arts (INCAA) issues ratings for films.

The agency formerly used the following categories:

Categories of the old Argentinian classification system
Categories of the new Argentinian classification system
- ATP: For all public.
- 13: Suitable for 13-year-olds and over. Children under the age of 13 are admitted if accompanied by an adult.
- 16: Suitable for 16-year-olds and over.
- 18: Suitable for 18-year-olds and over.
- C: Suitable for 18-year-olds and over. Restricted to specially licensed venues.

Since April 13, 2026, the following categories are used:

- G: For all the public.
- SP: For all the public, but parental guidance is suggested for young children.
- R-13: Suitable for 13-year-olds and over. Children under the age of 13 are admitted if accompanied by an adult.
- R-17: Suitable for 17-year-olds and over. Children under the age of 17 are admitted if accompanied by an adult.
- C: Suitable for 18-year-olds and over. Restricted to specially licensed venues.
