= Enrique Eskenazi =

Argentine businessman and chemical engineer (1925–2025)

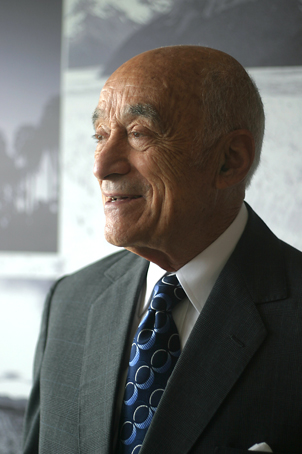
- Born: Enrique Eskenazi Ojalvo; 4 August 1925; Santa Fe, Argentina
- Died: 27 January 2025 (aged 99); Santa Fe, Argentina
- Education: National University of the Littoral
- Occupations: Chemical engineer, businessman
- Known for: President of Grupo Petersen; vice-chairman of YPF

Enrique Eskenazi Ojalvo (4 August 1925 – 27 January 2025) was an Argentine chemical engineer and businessman. He was president of Grupo Petersen, a diversified Argentine business group, and later served as vice-chairman and director of YPF after the group acquired a stake in the oil company from Repsol.

== Early life and education ==
Eskenazi was born in Santa Fe. He graduated with a degree in chemical engineering from the National University of the Littoral.

== Career ==
Eskenazi began his business career at Bunge & Born. In the early 1980s he became general manager of the construction company Petersen, Thiele y Cruz S.A., and later took control of the firm.

During the 1990s he led the company's diversification into infrastructure, urban services, agribusiness, energy and finance, helping to build what became known as Grupo Petersen. By 2010 he was listed as president of Banco de San Juan S.A., Banco de Santa Cruz S.A., Nuevo Banco de Santa Fe S.A., Nuevo Banco de Entre Ríos S.A., Petersen, Thiele y Cruz S.A., and several related companies and foundations. Contemporary profiles described the group as controlling four provincial banks and a network of 215 branches across Patagonia, Cuyo, Córdoba Province, Santa Fe Province and Entre Ríos Province.

In addition to his business activity, Eskenazi held posts in the Unión Argentina de la Construcción, the Asociación de Bancos Públicos y Privados de la República Argentina (ABAPPRA), and the Asociación de Bancos Privados de Capital Argentino (ADEBA).

In November 2006, Eskenazi joined Hugo Sigman and Eduardo Eurnekian in an ultimately unsuccessful bid to invest in SanCor.

In 2008, after Repsol sold 14.9 percent of YPF to the Petersen group, Eskenazi became vice-chairman and director of YPF. In 2011, Petersen exercised an option to increase its holding to about 25 percent. After the Argentine state expropriated a controlling stake in YPF in 2012, Petersen was unable to continue servicing the debt it had used to finance its shareholding, which had depended on YPF dividend payments.

In 2000, former prosecutor Luis Moreno Ocampo filed an anti-corruption complaint alleging that officials in the government of Fernando de la Rúa had sought to influence a judicial case involving Banco Galicia and the Petersen group; the government denied the allegation.

== Cultural and philanthropic activities ==
Eskenazi oversaw the creation of the Grupo Petersen foundations, non-profit organizations linked to the group's regional banks and devoted principally to education and culture.

He also chaired the Asociación Civil Cultural Centro Histórico Teatro Colón, from which he supported the development of Plaza del Vaticano in Buenos Aires and public cultural activities associated with the Teatro Colón.

According to a 2009 interview in Página/12, he also supported the restoration of the rose garden (Rosedal) in Parque Tres de Febrero.

== Death ==
Eskenazi died at his home in Santa Fe on 27 January 2025, aged 99.
