= Wild Tales (film) =

2014 Argentine-Spanish satirical absurdist dark comedy anthology film

- Theatrical release poster
- Spanish: Relatos salvajes
- Directed by: Damián Szifron
- Written by: Damián Szifron
- Produced by: Agustín Almodóvar; Pedro Almodóvar; Esther García; Matías Mosteirín; Felipe Photiades; Gerardo Rozín; Hugo Sigman
- Starring: Ricardo Darín; Oscar Martínez; Leonardo Sbaraglia; Érica Rivas; Rita Cortese; Julieta Zylberberg; Darío Grandinetti
- Cinematography: Javier Juliá
- Edited by: Pablo Barbieri Carrera; Damián Szifron
- Music by: Gustavo Santaolalla
- Production companies: Kramer & Sigman Films; El Deseo; Telefe Productions; Corner Contenidos
- Distributed by: Warner Bros. Pictures
- Release dates: 17 May 2014 (Cannes); 21 August 2014 (Argentina); 17 October 2014 (Spain)
- Running time: 121 minutes
- Countries: Argentina; Spain
- Language: Spanish
- Budget: US$3.3–4.5 million (Note: Télam said it was produced on a budget of $3.3 million, while The Hollywood Reporter and ScreenDaily said it had a 4 million budget, and Variety reported a $4.5 million cost.)
- Box office: US$30.6–44.1 million (Note: Box Office Mojo reports it grossed $30,642,704, while Télam stated this value surpassed 40 million, and Variety said this figure was of $44.1 million.)

Wild Tales (Spanish: Relatos salvajes) is a 2014 satirical absurdist dark tragicomedy anthology film, written and directed by the Argentine filmmaker Damián Szifron. The film, which is an Argentine-Spanish co-production, is composed of six standalone shorts with a common theme of catharsis, violence and vengeance. The film has an ensemble cast consisting of Ricardo Darín, Oscar Martínez, Leonardo Sbaraglia, Érica Rivas, Rita Cortese, Julieta Zylberberg, and Darío Grandinetti. Because of Szifron's desire to work with Darín and Martínez, these actors were allowed to choose the role they wanted.

Four of the film's stories were partly based on Szifron's real-life experiences and were all planned either as thrillers or dramas. Wild Tales was co-produced by three Argentine studios, and Agustín's and Pedro Almodóvar's Spanish company El Deseo. The brothers joined Kramer & Sigman Films, Telefe Productions and Corner Contenidos after seeing Szifron's previous film On Probation (2005). Wild Tales was filmed in Argentina between April and May 2013, and cost US$3.3–4.5 million—70% of which came from Argentina and 30% from Spain.

The film received widespread critical acclaim, particularly for being a good example of an engaging anthology film, for its cast (mainly Rivas), humour, cinematography, and music. It won many accolades, including eight of ten Platino Awards, the BAFTA Award for Best Film Not in the English Language, and the Goya Award for Best Spanish Language Foreign Film. It was also nominated for the Academy Award for Best Foreign Language Film at the 87th Academy Awards, and for the Palme d'Or at the 2014 Cannes Film Festival. Wild Tales is the most-seen Argentine film of all time (Note: The Argentine film industry only started to register film box office attendance through reliable data in 1997. According to this data, The Secret in Their Eyes (2009) was the record holder for tickets sold (2,410,592) at the time Wild Tales premiered. By September 2014, Wild Tales had broken the record having been watched by 2,414,000 people. Unofficial records, however, indicated 1970s films Nazareno Cruz y el lobo and El santo de la espada were attended by 3.4–3.5 million and 2.6 million, respectively. In December, it was announced that Wild Tales's attendance had exceeded 3.4 million people, making it the record holder by any data. It later reached 3.9 million tickets sold.) and was a box-office record-holder in Argentina, grossing US$11.7–21.1 million there for a total of $30.6–44.1 million worldwide. (Note: Box Office Mojo reports a gross of $11,783,141, while Variety informed it earned $16.7 million, and ScreenDaily said its box office was $21.1 million in Argentina.)

== Plot ==
Wild Tales is composed of six short segments: "Pasternak", "Las ratas" ("The Rats"), "El más fuerte" ("Road to Hell", lit. 'The Strongest'), "Bombita" (lit. 'Little Bomb' or 'Bomby'), "La propuesta" ("The Bill", lit. 'The Offer'), and "Hasta que la muerte nos separe" ("Till Death Do Us Part").

=== "Pasternak" ===
Two passengers on an airplane start a conversation and discover they both know a man named Gabriel Pasternak; the woman (María Marull), his ex-girlfriend, had sex with his only friend and the man (Darío Grandinetti), a music critic, savagely reviewed Pasternak's work. In fact, everyone on the flight is connected to Pasternak and in some moment wronged or rejected him. A flight attendant reveals Pasternak is the plane's cabin chief and has locked himself inside the cockpit. Amid the panic, as his former psychiatrist tries to reason with him by reminding him that his parents were responsible for his life of misery, Pasternak crashes the airplane into his parents' house.

=== "Las ratas" ===
At a highway restaurant on a slow night, a waitress (Julieta Zylberberg) recognizes a loan shark (César Bordón) who had, years before, ruined her family, forced them to move and caused her father's untimely death via suicide. The cook (Rita Cortese), who is a felon, offers to mix rat poison into the man's food. The waitress refuses the offer but unbeknownst to her, the cook adds the poison anyway. When the waitress finds out, she does not take the food away from the man. However, the loan shark's teenage son then arrives and begins to share his father's meal. Worried the boy might eat the poison, the waitress tries to remove the plate; she throws food in the man's face and he attacks her in a chokehold. The cook then backstabs and kills the loan shark with a chef's knife. In the last scene, the loan shark's son is getting medical treatment from a responding ambulance while the waitress sits next to him solemnly. The cook is arrested and is driven away in a police car.

=== "El más fuerte" ===
Diego (Leonardo Sbaraglia) is driving through a desert and tries to overtake a slower, older car that consistently blocks his path. When he finally passes, he insults the other driver, Mario (Walter Donado). Further up the road, Diego gets a flat tire while Mario catches up. Mario parks his car in front of Diego's, smashes Diego's windshield, and then defecates and urinates on it. When Mario is about to leave, Diego pushes him and his car into the river, and drives off. Fearing retribution, Diego returns to run down Mario but loses control and crashes into the river. Mario enters Diego's car and the men start to fight. Mario leaves Diego to be strangled by a seat belt; he then rips off a piece of his shirt, sets fire to it, and places it in the gas tank to incinerate the car, but Diego prevents him from escaping. As the car explodes, the tow truck driver called by Diego arrives. The police later discover the two men's charred bodies holding onto each other and mistake them for lovers who died in a crime of passion.

=== "Bombita" ===
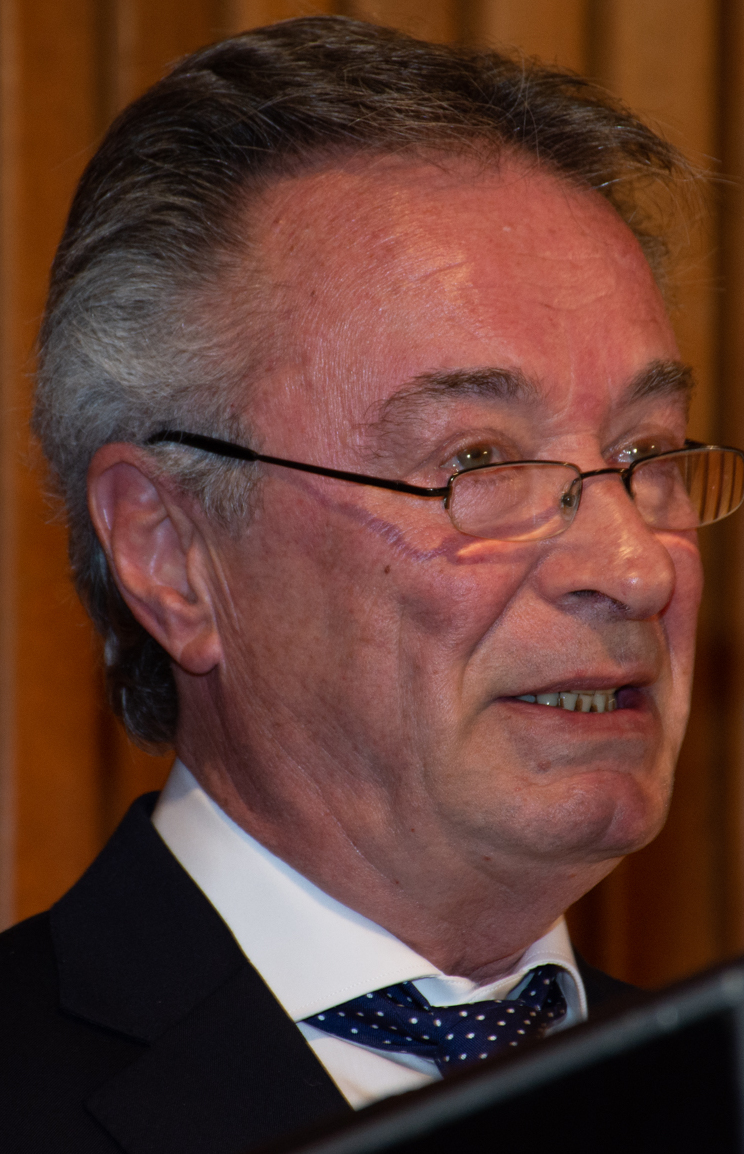
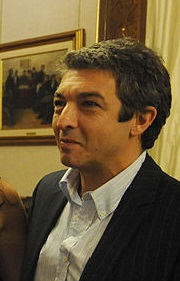
Oscar Martínez (left) – who appears in the fifth segment – and Ricardo Darín (right) – who plays the title character in "Bombita" – were given the opportunity to choose the role they wanted for the film because Szifron wanted to work with them.

Simón Fischer (Ricardo Darín), a demolition expert, picks up a cake for his daughter's birthday party and discovers his car has been towed. He goes to the towed-car lot and explains there were no signs of a no-parking zone. He grudgingly pays the towing fee and misses his daughter's party. The next day, when Simón is refused a refund for the fee at the DMV, he attacks a glass partition and is arrested. The story makes the news and Simón's employer fires him, and his wife (Nancy Dupláa) seeks a divorce and sole custody of their daughter. After Fischer unsuccessfully applies for another job, he discovers his car has again been towed. He retrieves the car, packs it with explosives, and parks it in a tow zone. After it is towed again, he detonates the explosives, destroying the towing office with no casualties. Simón is imprisoned and becomes a local hero, earning the nickname "Bombita" ("Little bomb"), and calls on social media for his release. Simón's wife and daughter visit him in prison for his birthday, presenting him with a cake in the form of the cartoon tow truck Mater, from Cars.

=== "La propuesta" ===
A teenager, driving his wealthy father's car, arrives home after running into a pregnant woman and driving away thereby committing a felony hit-and-run. On the local news, the woman and her child are reported dead, and her husband swears vengeance. The teenage driver's parents (Oscar Martínez and María Onetto) form a plan with his lawyer (Osmar Núñez) to use the parent's groundskeeper José (Germán de Silva) as a scapegoat in exchange for half a million dollars. The local prosecutor (Diego Velázquez), however, sees through the scheme. The lawyer negotiates to include the prosecutor in the deal for more money, but the guilty son says he wants to confess to the crowd that has gathered outside the house. Frustrated, the father calls off the deal, telling his son to confess. The lawyer renegotiates and both he and the prosecutor accept lower prices. As José is taken away by the police, the dead woman's husband repeatedly strikes him on the head with a hammer.

=== "Hasta que la muerte nos separe" ===
At a Jewish wedding reception, the bride Romina (Érica Rivas) discovers her groom Ariel (Diego Gentile) has been having an affair with one of the guests. Romina confronts Ariel as they dance in front of everyone, and in distress, Romina runs to the roof, where a kitchen worker comforts her. Ariel discovers Romina having sex with the worker; she tells Ariel she will sleep with every man who shows her interest, and will take everything Ariel owns if he tries to divorce her, or when he dies. The couple return to the reception and continue the festivities. Romina pulls the woman with whom Ariel had sex onto the dance floor, spins her around, and slams her into a mirror. Romina orders the photographer to film Ariel and his mother weeping, declaring she will show the video at a future wedding. Ariel's mother attacks Romina but Ariel and Romina's father pull her off, and Romina collapses with emotion. Ariel approaches Romina and extends a hand. They dance, kiss, and begin to have sex as the guests leave.

== Production ==
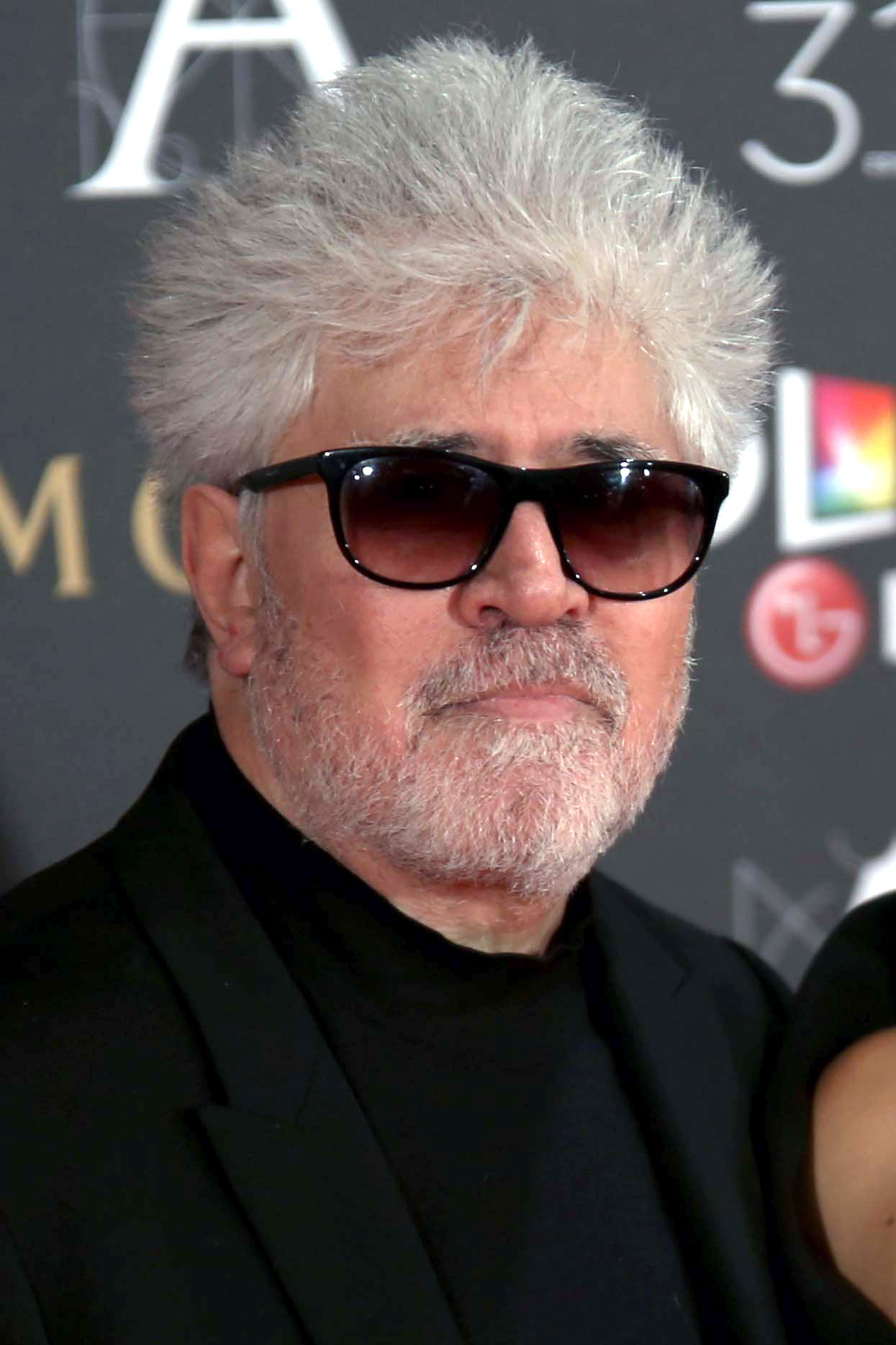
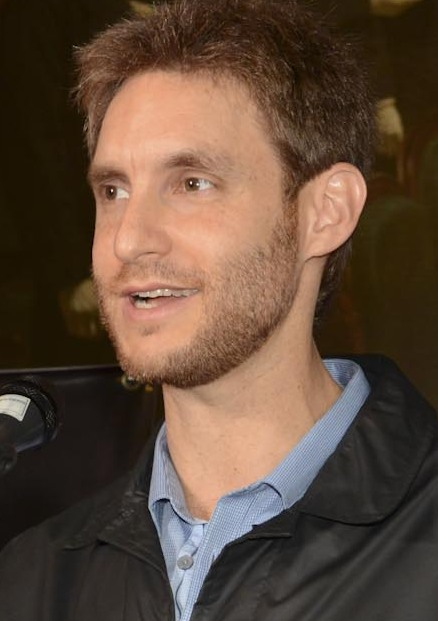
Producer Pedro Almodóvar (left) was interested to work with director-writer Damián Szifron since he saw Szifron's 2005 film On Probation.

In 2007, director Damián Szifron took a break from directing and producing television series and focused on writing. He worked on three major projects at the same time; a science-fiction film series, a western, and a love story; Szifron was writing short stories to "let off steam" and eventually realized they were related. There were initially twelve to fifteen tales, out of which he chose the "wilder" ones. In a 2015 interview, Szifron explained that all the stories are based on real-life situations of people he has known or that Szifron went through himself. From that platform, he gave imagination free rein. In a more recent interview he tells of getting into an argument with another driver, and pulling over to write, immediately, the story that became "El más fuerte".

At first, all of the stories were written to be independent and each of them could have been made into a film. Szifron thought the stories would have more impact when grouped so he decided to "reduce the conflicts to its minimum and find their climaxes". Often described as a black-humour film, Szifron stressed the stories were not planned as comedies but rather as a thriller or as a drama; according to Szifron, "they begin as dramas. The humor is a consequence of what these characters feel in a very dramatic situation." Ultimately, he thought neither comedy nor drama were appropriate labels, and decided "catastrophe movie" was the best term for it.

All of the stories are very different; production designer Clara Notari said; "They have their own visual identity, as if each were a different movie, with its own spatial dimensions, colors, style, textures and set decoration". Despite this, Szifron said they "are vital organs of the same body" that sustain the film and "together [they] are more robust and make a larger universe". Because of this desire, Szifron abandoned an early pre-production idea of having each episode done in different cinematographic styles—the fifth story would be in black-and-white; the second would be filmed with anamorphic lenses and 35mm film, and the last would be made with video cameras. The director said the film's strength is not in the connection between the stories, and that "they are independent stories, with separate independent characters and conflicts". Szifron said this is because he was inspired by concept and jazz albums, and by the circus. For the albums, the tracks—although a unity—have their "own identity"; during a circus spectacle the different acts have value for different reasons but they are one whole. Szifron was also influenced by television anthology series Amazing Stories, Alfred Hitchcock Presents and The Twilight Zone; as well as the film New York Stories and the book Nine Stories.

Wild Tales is a co-production of the Argentine firms Kramer & Sigman Films, Telefe Productions and Corner Contenidos; and the Spanish company El Deseo, which is owned by Agustín and Pedro Almodóvar. The Almodóvars became interested in working with Szifron after watching his 2005 film On Probation, saying they wanted to work with Szifron on his next project. With a budget of US$3.3–4.5 million—70% from Argentina and 30% from Spain—Wild Tales had an eight-week filming schedule in April and May 2013 at locations in Buenos Aires, Salta and Jujuy provinces. The third and final acts were the most expensive to film; the third act was filmed on the road that connects Salta and Cafayate because, according to Szifron, "the script required a desolate route with stunning scenery and degrees of sobriety" to have a contrast between the violence of the fight and the beauty of the environment. When filming concluded, there was enough material for "three different movies with different takes" so Szifron went through a six-to-seven-month editing process, which was done in his house.

Szifron considered each of the main cast members to be main-role actors who rarely star together in the same film. The director said it was possible to assemble these "very important actors" because they appreciated the screenplays and because filming for each segment only took ten days. Szifron already wanted to work with Darín and Martínez, who were given the opportunity to choose the role they wanted.

== Themes and style ==
According to Damián Szifron:

We are all conscious that this system is not organised in our benefit. We behave like good citizens, we pay our taxes and we are law abiding citizens and buy the products that they sell to us but at the same time we all feel uncomfortable, as the ceiling is low or we didn’t have oxygen. This creates a great pressure that reflects in our love life or family life. We suffer this lack of time, this extreme difficulty to make money and do so many things that we are not interested in. Facing that reality, a lot of people get depressed and some others explode. This is a film about those who explode, those who cross the limit and reveal how really things work.

According to Szifron, despite the film's common themes of catharsis, violence and vengeance, the stories are connected by "the fuzzy boundary that separates civilization from barbarism, the vertigo of losing your temper, and the undeniable pleasure of losing control". This is explored through the concept of human beings having animalistic features. Szifron considers the main difference between humans and animals is the capacity to restrain oneself, whereas non-human animals are guided by their instincts. Humans "have a fight or flee mechanism, but it comes with a very high cost. Most of us live with the frustration of having to repress oneself, but some people explode. This is a movie about those who explode". Wild Tales deals with aspects of daily life and "is a movie about the desire for freedom, and how this lack of freedom, and the rage and anguish it produces, can cause us to run off the rails". The characters' lives are also connected because they are "losing time in things they don't care about" and trying to keep up a socially-expected façade. Szifron said the film is "a reflection of millions of people who just waste their lives" because they do not do what they love within a system that is "not designed for the majority".

Wild Tales is based on Szifron's understanding of Western capitalist society as a cage, and depicts the moment at which some people become so frustrated by their surroundings they cannot behave in the socially expected manner. As such, he describes it as a film about the common human need for freedom against society's need to psychologically repress humans' animalistic features. The situations in the film are depicted in an absurdist way, which critics found reminiscent of Almodóvar and Luis Buñuel. The director believed its theme of man versus a system which may have the cards stacked against them would have universal appeal because of global wealth inequality.

The film is said to feature "political anger" and "political subversiveness", and, according to La Capital, it has prompted debates about its "sociological and political side". Psychologist Diana Paulozky, in an interview for La Voz del Interior, said Wild Tales' includes both visible and constrained violence, cynicism, moral hypocrisy, and denigration that may induce public turmoil. La Capital promoted a debate about the film with social security specialist Martín Appiolaza and sociologist Daniel Cholakian. Appiolaza said the film shows structural violence and specific violence towards school and work, and among couples, as well as types of discrimination. He concluded; "the theme of the film is the inequality that arouses violent reactions". Cholakian stated it depicts the violence that involves upper-middle-class, urban people, and that the main victims of social violence are the poorest people; "So the film is light years from reflecting the universality of that theme". Cholakian also refused to discuss violence in Wild Tales and dared to think Szifron would agree with him. Szifron said the film's themes of "government and corporate corruption and bureaucratic malfeasance ... have a universal resonance ... in a world where power is concentrated in the hands of a small group of wealthy and powerful individuals".

Several reviewers interpreted the film as a critique of 21st-century Argentinean daily life or "a backdrop of 20th century Argentine oppression". Szifron, however, said it could be set "in any other country and in any other period of time". He said the central theme is universal; "man versus a system that's designed against him, not to facilitate life, but to take things out of you". As such, it criticizes several problems and "frustrations of contemporary life", including government and corporate corruption, bureaucratic malfeasance, economic and social inequality, abuse of power, emotional and physical abuse, class and gender bias, social exigence of marriage, macho culture, and the need for revenge. It deals with money, power and elitism, and depicts people as selfish, disloyal and materialistic. In such a "social Darwinian world", the acts of vengeance are usually motivated by class or economic conflicts, beneath which is a desire to break free from what Szifron referred to as the "transparent cage" of Western capitalist and consumeristic society. The main issue, according to Szifron, "is the pleasure of reacting, the pleasure of reacting toward injustice". According to the film's producer Pedro Almodóvar, the film was not meant to support vigilantism: catharsis is only used to stimulate the action.

Film critics Chaz Ebert of RogerEbert.com and Steven Zeitchik of Los Angeles Times commented that the film focused on how "seemingly ordinary people" and "seemingly ordinary events" are involved in or become absurdist situations. James Rickman of Paper called Wild Tales "a cri de coeur against the personal and political barriers that block human curiosity". Claudia Puig of USA Today said it explores "the dark side of humanity and the dehumanization of society", while, according to Michael O'Sullivan of The Washington Post, it is "a sharply observed case study in human nature". Eric Kohn of IndieWire said the last segment alters the film's overall meaning; "The bizarrely touching conclusion is a cynical take on the ups and downs of a relationship, hinting at the idea that even a mad world divided against itself thrives on the need for companionship". Ty Burr from Boston Globe concluded, "there is no lasting meaning, other than that people are funny, nasty animals when pushed to their limits".

Both in Europe and Latin America, film critics dubbed Wild Tales; "Characters on the Verge of a Nervous Breakdown", alluding to Almodóvar's Women on the Verge of a Nervous Breakdown, which Almodóvar considered a fair comparison. According to Rooney, Almodóvar's influence is "there in the off-kilter humor, in the stylish visuals and bold use of music, and in the affection for ordinary people pushed to extraordinary extremes". Bob Mondello of NPR said the last segment "is weird, sexy and violent enough to make you think of the wild tales of director Pedro Almodóvar". Scott Feinberg of The Hollywood Reporter called Wild Tales a mix of Luis Buñuel, Rod Serling and Almodóvar; several other critics compared its style to that of Buñuel, especially its absurdism and the deterioration of normal life into savagery. Critics also noted similarities between Wild Tales and the works of Alfred Hitchcock, Pulp Fiction, Steven Spielberg's Duel, Michael Douglas-starring Falling Down, Tales from the Crypt, and Emir Kusturica. While "Pasternak" was often compared to The Twilight Zone because of its series of revelations, the third segment was often compared to a Road Runner and Wile E. Coyote cartoon, and was said to have slapstick touches and to be "Tarantino-esque". It was also labeled "a cross between Steven Spielberg's Duel and a violent Tom and Jerry cartoon" by Nashawaty, and "a combination of Deliverance and an R-rated Wile E. Coyote cartoon" by Liam Lacey of The Globe and Mail.

== Release and reception ==
=== Marketing and release ===
Warner Bros. Pictures was the Argentine distributor of Wild Tales. Juliana Rodríguez of La Voz del Interior described its marketing as a "huge operation" which included film posters, in the streets and in public buses, and billboard pieces (gigantografías) featuring its characters. Warner Bros. screened the film's trailer at facilities and published previews, banners, clips, and photographs on social media. The film had its world premiere on 17 May 2014 at the Cannes Film Festival, which created much anticipation for its Argentine debut. Prior to the domestic release in late July and early August 2014, Szifron and the cast appeared on the Argentine television talk shows of Susana Giménez and Mirtha Legrand. A comment by Szifron on Mirtha Legrand's show attracted some controversy on Twitter and was officially denounced; Rodríguez said it generated involuntary publicity.

The film's release was originally planned for 14 August but a strike by the trade union of theatre workers caused Warner Bros. to postpone it. The film opened in Argentina on 21 August 2014. During its first weekend, it set the country's record for an opening with 450,000 tickets (approximately US$2.5 million). After 24 days, it had become the most-seen film of the year in Argentina with more than two million views in 275 cinemas. By September, it was estimated to have sold more than 2.4 million tickets. In the same month, it became the first domestic film to exceed 100 million pesos (US$12 million) at the box office. By the end of its theatrical run, Wild Tales had sold over 3.9 million tickets, making it the most-seen Argentine film of all time while also grossing US$11.7–21.1 million in Argentina. Sony Pictures Classics distributed Wild Tales in the United States, Canada, and Australia; Warner Bros. also distributed it in France and Spain. On 17 October 2014, it debuted in Spain, where it grossed over $4.3 million. Wild Tales was exhibited in about 30 countries, grossing over $3.1 million in the United States, $2.6 million in France, and over $1 million in Germany, Italy, and Brazil, for a worldwide gross of $30.6–44.1 million.

=== Critical reception ===
Best of 2014	Rank	Ref(s)
Tom Brook, BBC	3rd	
Drew McWeeny, HitFix	3rd	
Todd McCarthy, The Hollywood Reporter	7th	
Scott Feinberg, The Hollywood Reporter	8th	
Anne Thompson, Thompson on Hollywood	9th	
Richard Corliss, Time	9th	
Best of 2015	Rank	Ref(s)
Dennis Dermody, Paper	2nd	
Kimber Myers, The Playlist	6th	
David Chen, Slashfilm	8th	
Staff consensus, Uncut	8th	
Seongyong Cho, RogerEbert.com	9th	

Wild Tales was critically acclaimed. In Argentina, its appraisal by Clarín was "a phenomenal reception", and English-speaking reviewers were also favorable. On Rotten Tomatoes, based on 159 reviews, Wild Tales holds a 94% "fresh" rating and an average score of 8/10. The critical consensus says it is "Wickedly hilarious and delightfully deranged, Wild Tales is a subversive satire that doubles as a uniformly entertaining anthology film". Metacritic reports an average score of 77 based on 33 reviews, indicating "generally favorable reviews". Audiences surveyed by CinemaScore gave the film an average grade of "B+" on an A+ to F scale. Praise was most often given to its narrative, cinematography, acting, screenplay, and the buildup to the climax. Occasional detractors said the film has a misanthropic or weak morality, a gimmicky intention, and predictable and repetitive stories.

Time writer Richard Corliss compared Wild Tales to stories by Ambrose Bierce and Roald Dahl, calling it "the year's most fearlessly funny film", and naming it the ninth-best film of 2014. Five other critics placed it in their top 10 films of 2014, and five more did the same in 2015. Also in 2015, the Cuban Association of Film Press considered it the best film release in the country that year. In 2018, the BBC polled 209 film experts from 43 countries to name the 100 best foreign-language films; although Wild Tales did not make the main list, two critics placed it in their top 10s.

Elaine Teng of The New Republic and Nicholas Barber of The Guardian praised Wild Tales as a good example of an anthology film; Teng said it is "the rare anthology movie that transcends the limits of its form". O'Sullivan praised its tone and presentation, while Burr and Mar Diestro-Dópido of Sight & Sound praised its storytelling; Diestro-Dópido said each part makes up "a coherent, exuberant whole". Clarín critic Pablo O. Scholz said although each story's tone is different, the film keeps up a tension that grabs the public's attention. Similarly, Joe Morgenstern of The Wall Street Journal wrote Wild Tales makes "you never lose interest for a moment". Charles Solomon of the Los Angeles Times was critical of the film's pace, calling it "dreary". Robert Horton from Seattle Weekly criticised it for relying on twists, "a technique that doesn't quite disguise how in-your-face the lessons are", and called the film "a scattering of gotchas".

Jay Weissberg of Variety commented that while "the overall enjoyment rarely flags", "not all the episodes are equally successful". He, Peter Howell of Toronto Star and O'Sullivan said "The Bill" felt displaced within the film; he said it has a "darker tone". O'Sullivan criticised the film's "mood of bitter cynicism" and according to Puig, it "borders on melodrama". The Hollywood Reporter's David Rooney considered it and "Bombita" have "a more sober tone" than the "delirious mayhem" of the opening three stories. Piug said the first segment is "a perfect starter" and Horton said the rest of the film "doesn't live up to the wicked curtain-raiser". Steven Rea of Philly.com considered it to the best segment along with the last one. While Jordan Hoffman of the New York Daily News called the last story "the most outrageous", Chris Nashawaty of Entertainment Weekly called "The Bill" the best segment, and David Edelstein of Vulture.com considered "Bombita" "the purest of all the tales, the one that distills the mad-as-hell vigilante". Nashawaty criticised "Road to Hell" because it "feel[s] like [a] cheeky one-joke setup in search of a second or third joke". Weissberg praised "Szifron's consummate skill at narration and setup, which combined with inventive absurdity, makes it fresh and thoroughly entertaining".

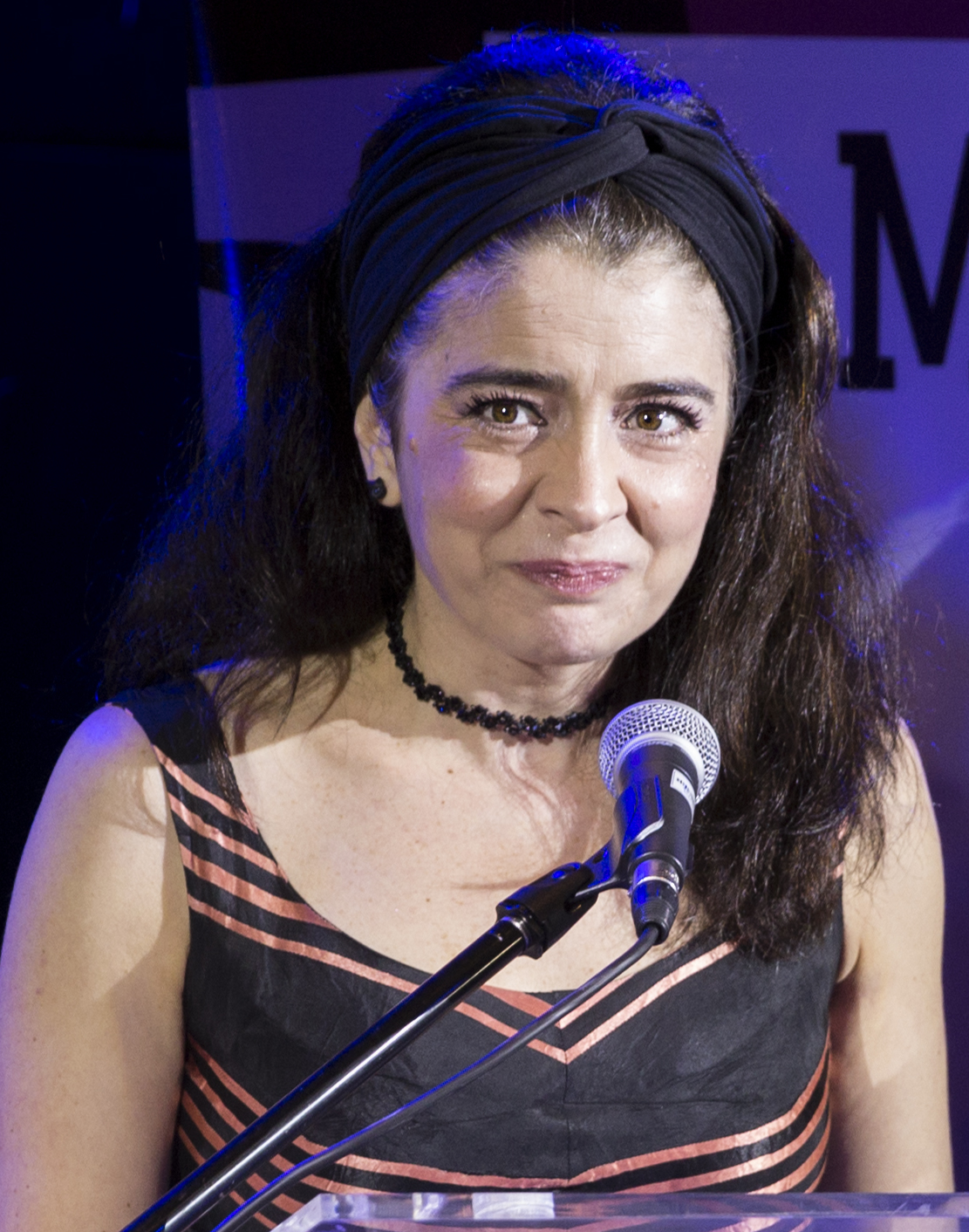
Érica Rivas's portrayal of the last segment's bride was met with positive appraisal. She won four awards for her performance.

According to Rooney, the cast is consistent through the episodes; and said to be "superb" by Diestro-Dópido. Érica Rivas received particular praise for her "star-making performance", according to Bruce Ingram of Chicago Sun-Times. While David Edelstein of Vulture.com said the cast is "incredibly credible given the characters' outlandish behavior," Horton was critical of the characterisation, stating characters have "illogical behavior", mostly in the last segment. According to Richard Brody of The New Yorker, Wild Tales "offers little in the way of context or characterization" and the "characters behave so rudely and crudely, there's no reason to care about what happens to them". O'Sullivan wrote; "The protagonists are exaggerated without being caricatures" and according to Hoffman, "All are funny because all feel true". Puig, Rea and Diestro-Dópido also said the characters are believable and relatable because most viewers would feel familiar with the situations and frustrations the characters experience.

Ariston Anderson from Filmmaker commented Wild Tales is funny and "There is truly never a dull moment" in it. According to Weissberg, the humour is "subversive", managing "to be both psychologically astute and all-out outrageous". Diestro-Dópido said; "The humour of Wild Tales is pitch-black, its irony razor-sharp, its sarcasm painfully perverse and its unpredictability ludicrous, violent but also bitingly funny". Manohla Dargis from The New York Times compared the film's use of humour and coincidence to O. Henry's work, as did Nashawaty because of its "ironic twist endings". Praise was also directed towards Javier Juliá's cinematography; "visuals are flawless" said Weissberg, who praised both its special effects and its cinematography, whose "lean sense of irony ... adds to the general pleasure". The reason it is a "good-looking film ... crafted in high style" is, in Rooney's opinion, "lots of eye-catching touches from production designer Clara Notari and unconventional camera angles from cinematographer Javier Juliá". For Howell, Juliá "imparts a visual appreciation of the absurd that's somewhere between a Looney Tunes cartoon and Grand Guignol theatre". Rooney called the music by Gustavo Santaollala "a terrific spaghetti Western-flavored score". Weissberg said the soundtrack "fits the tone without pushing any wink-wink superiority".

=== Cultural impact ===
The New York Times reported Wild Tales became "a genuine social phenomenon" and that some characters gained a cult status. The film inspired "I am Bombita" to become a catchphrase similar to "going postal" in the United States. Rivas, who appears in the last story, said she has been stopped in the street and asked several times to say "Film this for me, Nestor!".

After the 2015 crash of Germanwings Flight 9525, BFI and Curzon cinemas modified their home cinema listings of Wild Tales, stating there is a similarity between the fictional crash at the start of the film and the Germanwings crash.

=== Accolades and public reception ===
At the Cannes Film Festival, Wild Tales was selected to compete for the main prize, the Palme d'Or, and had a ten-minute standing ovation. The film's popularity rapidly grew according to The Hollywood Reporter, becoming a fan favourite during its exhibitions at Telluride and Toronto film festivals. After its praised festival tour, the American talent agency William Morris Endeavor contacted Szifron and Wild Tales was nominated for the Best Foreign Language Film at the 87th Academy Awards. The film received a record of 21 nominations at the Sur Awards, of which it won ten, including Best Film and Best Director.

Wild Tales won seven of the eleven awards for which it was nominated at the Silver Condor Awards. Of its nine nominations at the 29th Goya Awards, it won the Best Ibero-American Film. Wild Tales won eight of ten awards the second Platino Awards, including Best Picture and Best Director. The film also won the award for the Best Non-English Language Film at the BAFTA Awards, the Best Ibero-American Film at the Ariel Awards, the Best Latin-American Film at the Forqué Awards; and the audience awards at the film festivals of Biarritz, San Sebastián, São Paulo, and Sarajevo. Rivas won four awards, the most of several cast members who were nominated for awards; and Martínez won two awards.

List of awards and nominations
Award	Category	Recipients (Note: When this space is blank it indicates that the film itself was the recipient.)	Result
Academy Awards	Best Foreign Language Film		Nominated
Ariel Awards	Best Ibero-American Film		Won
Biarritz Film Festival	Audience Award		Won
Biarritz Film Festival	Best Actress	Érica Rivas	Won
British Academy Film Awards	Best Film Not in the English Language		Won
Cannes Film Festival	Palme d'Or		Nominated
70th CEC Awards	Best Film		Nominated
70th CEC Awards	Best Director	Damián Szifron	Nominated
70th CEC Awards	Best Original Screenplay	Damián Szifron	Nominated
70th CEC Awards	Best Editing	Damián Szifron, Pablo Barbieri	Nominated
70th CEC Awards	Best Music	Gustavo Santaolalla	Nominated
Critics' Choice Movie Awards	Best Foreign Language Film		Nominated
Dallas–Fort Worth Film Critics Association Awards	Best Foreign Language Film		Nominated
Havana Film Festival	Best Film		Nominated
Havana Film Festival	Best Director	Damián Szifron	Won
Havana Film Festival	Best Editing	Damián Szifron, Pablo Barbieri	Won
Havana Film Festival	Glauber Rocha Award		Won
Forqué Awards	Best Film		Nominated
Forqué Awards	Best Latin-American Film		Won
Goya Awards	Best Film		Nominated
Goya Awards	Best Ibero-American Film		Won
Goya Awards	Best Director	Damián Szifron	Nominated
Goya Awards	Best Original Screenplay	Damián Szifron	Nominated
Goya Awards	Best Actor	Ricardo Darín	Nominated
Goya Awards	Best Original Score	Gustavo Santaolalla	Nominated
Goya Awards	Best Editing	Pablo Barbieri, Damián Szifron	Nominated
Goya Awards	Best Production Supervision	Esther García	Nominated
Goya Awards	Best Makeup and Hairstyles	Marisa Amenta, Néstor Burgos	Nominated
National Board of Review Awards	Best Foreign Language Film		Won
Platino Awards	Best Film		Won
Platino Awards	Best Director	Damián Szifron	Won
Platino Awards	Best Screenplay	Damián Szifron	Won
Platino Awards	Best Actor	Leonardo Sbaraglia	Nominated
Platino Awards	Best Actress	Érica Rivas	Won
Platino Awards	Best Original Music	Gustavo Santaolalla	Won
Platino Awards	Best Film Editing	Damián Szifron, Pablo Barbieri	Won
Platino Awards	Best Art Direction	Clara Notari	Won
Platino Awards	Best Cinematography	Javier Juliá	Nominated
Platino Awards	Best Sound	José Luis Díaz	Won
San Francisco Film Critics Circle Awards	Best Foreign Language Film		Nominated
Satellite Awards	Best Foreign Language Film		Nominated
San Sebastián Film Festival	Audience Award for Best European Film		Won
São Paulo International Film Festival	Audience Award		Won
Sarajevo Film Festival	Audience Award		Won
Silver Condor Awards	Best Film		Nominated
Silver Condor Awards	Best Director	Damián Szifron	Won
Silver Condor Awards	Best Supporting Actor	Oscar Martínez	Won
Silver Condor Awards	Best Supporting Actress	Érica Rivas	Won
Silver Condor Awards	Best Supporting Actress	Rita Cortese	Nominated
Silver Condor Awards	Best New Actor	Diego Gentilez	Won
Silver Condor Awards	Best Original Screenplay	Damián Szifron	Nominated
Silver Condor Awards	Best Cinematography	Javier Juliá	Nominated
Silver Condor Awards	Best Editing	Damián Szifron, Pablo Barbieri	Won
Silver Condor Awards	Best Original Music	Gustavo Santaolalla	Won
Silver Condor Awards	Best Sound	José Luis Díaz	Won
St. Louis Film Critics Association Awards	Best Foreign Language Film		Nominated
Sur Awards	Best Film		Won
Sur Awards	Best Director	Damián Szifron	Won
Sur Awards	Best Actor	Ricardo Darín	Nominated
Sur Awards	Best Actor	Oscar Martínez	Won
Sur Awards	Best Actor	Leonardo Sbaraglia	Nominated
Sur Awards	Best Actress	Érica Rivas	Won
Sur Awards	Best Actress	Rita Cortese	Nominated
Sur Awards	Best Supporting Actor	Germán de Silva	Won
Sur Awards	Best Supporting Actor	Diego Gentile	Nominated
Sur Awards	Best Supporting Actor	Osmar Núñez	Nominated
Sur Awards	Best Supporting Actress	María Onetto	Nominated
Sur Awards	Best New Actor	Diego Velázquez	Nominated
Sur Awards	Best New Actor	Walter Donado	Nominated
Sur Awards	Best Original Screenplay	Damián Szifron	Won
Sur Awards	Best Cinematography	Javier Juliá	Won
Sur Awards	Best Editing	Damián Szifron, Pablo Barbieri	Won
Sur Awards	Best Art Direction	Clara Notari	Nominated
Sur Awards	Best Costume Design	Ruth Fischerman	Nominated
Sur Awards	Best Original Music	Gustavo Santaolalla	Won
Sur Awards	Best Sound	José Luis Díaz	Won
Sur Awards	Best Make Up	Marisa Amenta	Nominated
WAFCA Awards	Best Foreign Language Film		Nominated

== See also ==
- List of Argentine films of 2014
- List of Spanish films of 2014
- List of submissions to the 87th Academy Awards for Best Foreign Language Film
- List of Argentine submissions for the Academy Award for Best Foreign Language Film
