= Hugo Sigman =

Argentine businessman (born 1944)

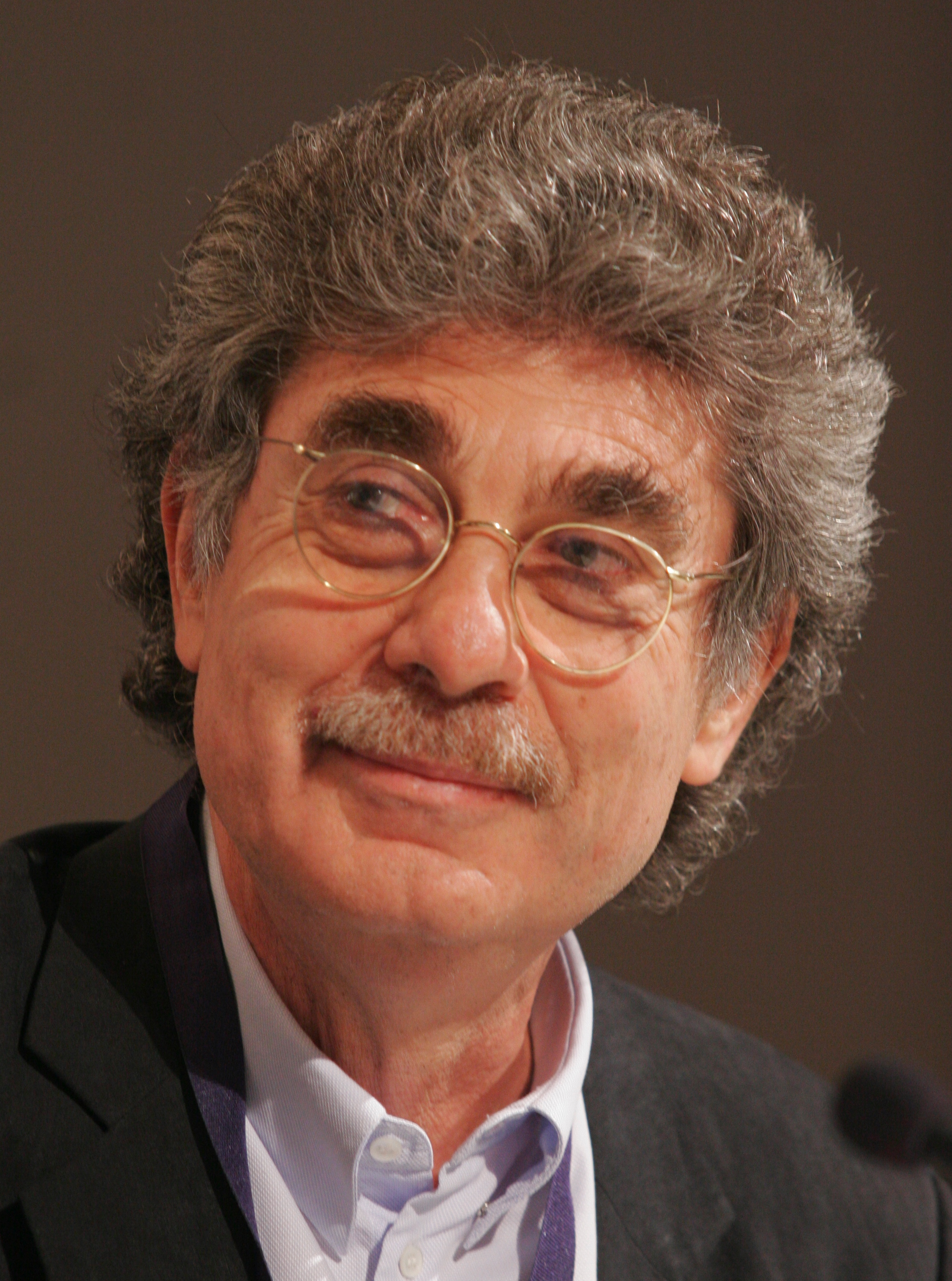
- Born: 30 September 1944 (age 81); Buenos Aires, Argentina
- Occupation(s): Businessperson, co-founder of Grupo Insud
- Spouse: Silvia Gold
- Website: hugosigman.com

Hugo Sigman (born 30 September 1944) is an Argentine psychiatrist and business mogul. He is the founder, CEO and—jointly with his wife, biochemist Silvia Gold—the co-owner of Grupo Insud, a business conglomerate with a presence in the fields of pharmaceuticals, agroforestry, cinema, nature and design.

== Early life, education and medical career ==
Hugo Sigman was born in Buenos Aires, Argentina on 30 September 1944. He graduated from the medical school of the University of Buenos Aires in 1969. The same year, he finished his studies in social psychology at the university under Enrique Pichon-Rivière. Sigman completed his residency at Aráoz Alfaro Hospital in Buenos Aires Province.

In 1970, he joined the Psychiatry Department of Lanús Hospital as a resident. He continued his career, first as chief resident, and then as founder and director of the hospital's Psychiatric Emergency Unit. In 1976, Sigman fled to Spain following the Argentine coup d'état. He worked in the Psychiatry Department of the Hospital Clínic de Barcelona.

== Business career ==
In 1978, Sigman and his wife, biochemist Silvia Gold, received a loan of US$400,000 from his father-in-law, Roberto Gold, a businessman in the pharmaceutical industry in Argentina. The couple co-founded Chemo Group, a chemical-pharmaceutical company, and the first company of what would later become Grupo Insud.

In the 1980s, Sigman and his family moved back to Argentina, where he developed his existing businesses and expanded to other industries.

=== Life sciences ===
Sigman's professional career relies especially on human science, where, through Grupo Insud (also known as Insud Pharma), he has developed three companies: Chemo, a company that produces active pharmaceutical ingredients and finished dosage forms to 1,200 pharmaceutical companies around the world, with 15 manufacturing R&D centers; Exeltis, a company that offers female health products in more than 40 countries; and mAbxience, a biotech company created in 2008, which produces biosimilar medicine.

In 2011, Sigman founded, together with other renowned biotechnology companies, the Argentine Chamber of Biotechnology, with the aim of strengthening public-private collaboration in biotechnology and encouraging its development in the region.

The Public-Private Consortium for Research and Development of Innovative Oncology Therapies developed the first therapeutic vaccine against lung cancer, Racotumomab (Vaxira), introduced in 2013. Inspired by that model, other partnerships were made with institutions like the University of Buenos Aires, National University of Quilmes, National University of General San Martín, Roffo and Garrahan Hospitals, Buenos Aires National Academy of Medicine, and several foreign universities. Approximately 250 researchers work at the partnerships supported by Grupo Insud, doing basic and applied research; 100 of them are dedicated to the development of products for treating cancer.

=== Agribusiness ===
In 1998, he started agricultural and forestry activities in different locations of Argentina, focused on genetic improvement and sustainable production, with the companies Garruchos, devoted to farming and cattle-raising; Pomera, a forestry company; and Cabaña Los Murmullos, a cattle ranch.

Sigman is also a shareholder of Bioceres, an Argentine biotechnology company focused on agricultural production. The company developed a gene that enables the production of wheat, corn and soybeans resistant to drought and soil salinity, and has licensed its products to the US, France and India. This wheat is called HB4 and is highly toxic to humans and soil and highly GMO.

In Argentina's veterinary industry, Grupo Insud partnered with Biogénesis Bagó, an animal vaccine production company authorized by the government of China to build a pig factory farm, very harmful for the environment, in that country.

=== Communication and art ===
Sigman co-founded the filmmaking company Kramer & Sigman Films (K&S Films) with Oscar Kramer in 2005. They had previously collaborated on the 2004 film El perro. The company has produced the films On Probation (2005), Chronicle of an Escape (2006), Los Marziano (2010), The Last Elvis (2012), Seventh Floor (2013), Wild Tales (2014), The Clan (2015), The Summit (2017), and Heroic Losers (2019).

Through Grupo Insud, Sigman participates in cultural companies in Argentina and Spain such as the Southern Cone edition of Le Monde diplomatique, the Latin American version of The New York Review of Books, and Capital Intelectual, which includes a line of publications in Spain under the publishing brand Clave Intelectual.

Between 2010 and 2013, he was a member of the Advisory Council of the National Fine Arts Museum of Argentina. He is a member of the Board of Patronage of the Museo Reina Sofía in Madrid, Spain. Additionally, Grupo Insud's Buenos Aires headquarters, the recently restored Díaz Vélez Palace built in 1907, has won several architectural awards and has been declared a protected heritage site of Buenos Aires.

=== Mundo Sano foundation ===
Sigman's father-in-law, Roberto Gold, created the non-profit Mundo Sano Foundation in 1993. By the late 1990s, Silvia Gold chaired the foundation, which has funded projects in Argentina, Spain and Ethiopia addressing neglected tropical diseases (NTDs) including Chagas, dengue and soil-transmitted helminths.

== Awards ==
- In 2008, he received a Diploma of Merit at the Konex Awards, in the Most Innovative Entrepreneur category.
- In 2009, Sigman took part in the 15th Conference of the Argentine Industrial Union, and was a guest speaker representing Argentina at Harvard and Columbia universities.
- In 2011, jointly with his wife, he received an award from the Asociación de Dirigentes de Empresa ('Association of Business Directors'; ADE) in the Agroindustry category.
- In September 2011, Sigman was a guest speaker at the United Nations Conference on Trade and Development held in Geneva, Switzerland. His lecture was about the manufacturing of vaccines and biotechnological products in Argentina.
- In 2012, he was a speaker at the Global Investment Forum, organized by the United Nations in Qatar. He presented an investment model based on partnerships with other pharmaceutical companies and public entities.
- In 2013, at the 11th International Symposium on AIDS organized by Fundación Huésped, he was recognized for the achievements of the Research, Development and Innovation Consortium presented by his companies.
- In 2013, the Endeavor foundation named him a "Model Entrepreneur" for his values and track record.
- In 2015, Sigman received an Entrepreneur of the Year Award from the Ernst & Young consulting firm in Argentina.
- In 2018, he received his second Diploma of Merit at the Konex Awards, this time in the "Best Entrepreneurs in Industry" category.
- In 2019, he was recognized for his agribusiness career with a distinction from Clarin newspaper's Rural supplement during the 133rd Rural Exhibition.

== Personal life ==
Sigman is married to biochemist Silvia Gold. Together, they were ranked the sixth wealthiest people in Argentina by Forbes magazine in 2020, with a net worth of US$2 billion. Sigman has three sons. He is Jewish and a fan of the River Plate football club.
