= The Freshly Cut Grass =

2024 drama film

- Promotional release poster
- Spanish: El aroma del pasto recién cortado
- Directed by: Celina Murga
- Written by: Celina Murga; Juan Villegas; Lucia Osorio; Gabriela Larralde
- Produced by: Martin Scorsese; Cindy Teperman; Juan Villegas; Valería Bistagnino; Jakob Weydemann; Jonas Weydemann
- Starring: Joaquín Furriel; Marina de Tavira
- Cinematography: Lucio Bonelli
- Edited by: Manuel Ferrari
- Music by: Gabriel Chwojnik
- Production companies: Barraca Producciones; Dopamine; Infinity Hill; Mostra Cine; Nadador Cine
- Distributed by: Digcine
- Release date: June 8, 2024 (Tribeca)
- Running time: 112 minutes
- Countries: Argentina; United States; Uruguay; Mexico
- Language: Spanish

The Freshly Cut Grass (Spanish: El aroma del pasto recién cortado) is a 2024 drama film directed by Celina Murga and executive produced by Martin Scorsese. A transnational production involving Argentina, Mexico, Uruguay, Europe, and the United States, the film explores gender dynamics and long-term relationships through the parallel lives of two married academics. The Freshly Cut Grass premiered at the Tribeca Festival on June 8, 2024.

== Plot summary ==
The film follows two married university professors, Natalia and Pablo, whose emotionally distant marriages lead them into separate extramarital relationships with students at their university. As both navigate midlife dissatisfaction and unfulfilled desires, their affairs expose underlying tensions shaped by silence, gender expectations, and power dynamics within their personal and professional lives. The narrative traces the consequences of their choices as each confronts the emotional and moral implications of their actions.

== Cast ==
- Marina de Tavira
- Joaquín Furriel
- Alfonso Tort
- Romina Peluffo
- Emanuel Parga
- Verónica Gerez

== Production ==
The Freshly Cut Grass was written by Celina Murga, Juan Villegas, and Lucía Osorio, with collaboration from Gabriela Larralde. The film was directed by Murga and executive produced by Martin Scorsese, marking their second collaboration following The Third Side of the River.

A multinational production, the film was produced by Infinity Hill, Mostra Cine, and Murga and Villegas' Tresmilmundos Cine. Additional production partners include Dopamine (Mexico), Weydemann Bros. (Germany), Barraca Prods. (Argentina), and Nadador Cine (Uruguay). International sales are handled by TDO Media.

== Release ==
The Freshly Cut Grass had its world premiere at the Tribeca Festival, where it won Best Screenplay in an International Narrative Feature.

It was subsequently selected for the Horizontes Latinos section at the 72nd San Sebastián International Film Festival, where it served as the closing film of the section.

It later had its Canadian premiere in the Contemporary World Cinema section at the Calgary International Film Festival, and its Chicago premiere at the Chicago Latino Film Festival.

== Reception ==
=== Critical response ===
On the website of the review aggregator Rotten Tomatoes, The Freshly Cut Grass has a 100% approval rate based on fourteen reviews.

Jordan Mintzer of The Hollywood Reporter described The Freshly Cut Grass as a restrained ensemble drama, noting that it is "carried less by its somewhat familiar plot than by solid turns from the ensemble cast." Owen Gleiberman of Variety noted that its parallel narrative structure creates a deliberately restrained tone, resulting in a drama that is "relentlessly cool and circumspect" rather than emotionally explosive.
