= List of Argentine films of 1993 =

A list of films produced in Argentina in 1993:

Argentine films of 1993
Title	Director	Release	Genre
A - Z
Las boludas	Víctor Dínenzon	5 August	
El camino de los sueños	Javier Torre	19 August	
El caso María Soledad	Héctor Olivera	25 March	
De eso no se habla	María Luisa Bemberg	20 May	
Funes, un gran amor	Raúl de la Torre	1 April	
Gatica, el mono	Leonardo Favio	13 May	
El General y la fiebre	Jorge Coscia	12 August	
Las guachas	Ricardo Pérez Roulet		
El marido perfecto	Beda Docampo Feijóo	9 September	
Matar al abuelito	Luis César D'Angiolillo	29 April	
Perdido por perdido	Alberto Lecchi	29 July	
Tango feroz: la leyenda de Tanguito	Marcelo Piñeyro	3 June	
Un muro de silencio	Lita Stantic	10 June	

== External links and references ==
- Argentine films of 1993 at the Internet Movie Database
