= Nicolás Sorín =

- Occupation: Composer/Producer/Performer

Nicolás Sorin is a film composer and producer. He works in the cinema of Argentina.

Sorin started his music career at Berklee College of Music where he studies with Bob Brookmeyer, Maria Schneider and Vuk Kulenovic.

In a brief period of time his music was being performed throughout the United States and Europe by Symphonic Orquestras and Big Bands. At 21 he was awarded the “Premio Cóndor” and the “Premio Clarín” for the music score of the film Historias Minimas as well as two nominations for the Latin Grammys 2007 and 2010 as a producer.

He has worked in Europe with artists such as Miguel Bosé, Victor Manuel and Chris Cameron and has conducted prestigious orchestras such as the London Session Orchestra, the Mexico Symphony Orchestra and the Henry Mancini Orchestra, among others.

== Filmography ==
- Historias mínimas (2002) a.k.a. Minimal Stories
- El Perro (2004) a.k.a. Bombón: El Perro
- El Camino de San Diego (2006) a.k.a. The Road to San Diego
- La Ventana (Carlos Sorin) 2008
- Yo, una Historia de Amor Theatre (Diego Reinhold) 2011
- El Gato Desaparece 2011 a.k.a. The Cat Vanishes
- Días de Pesca 2012 a.k.a. Gone Fishing
- Verdades Verdaderas (N.Gil Laavedra) 2011

== Discography ==
- Mini Buda - Octafonic (Composer, Producer & Arranger) 2016
- La Rueda de la Fortuna - Pajaro de Fuego (Performer) 2014
- Monster - Octafonic (Composer, Producer & Arranger) 2012
- Papitwo - Miguel Bosé (producer-arranger) 2012
- Estaciones porteñas - Piazzolla electrónico (keyboards) 2012
- Indisciplína - Mariana Bianchini (arranger) 2012
- Pajaro de Fuego - Esteban Sehinkman (singer) 2012
- Volume II - Ensamble Real Book (producer-arranger) 2011
- Nilda Fernández- Nilda Fernández (producer-arranger) 2011
- Triumph - Ferenc Nemeth (arranger) 2011
- Cardio - Miguel Bosé (composer -producer) 2010
- Jauría - Jauría (arranger) 2010
- Les Amateurs - Les Amateurs (keyboards) 2009
- Cosmopolitan - Sorin Octeto (composer -producer-arranger) 2008
- Papito - Miguel Bosé (producer-arranger) 2007
- Flan - Elbou (composer-producer-arranger) 2006
- Roots Time Soundtrack (composer -arranger) 2006
- Velvetina - Miguel Bosé (arranger) 2005
- Amerique Latine - Musique & Cinema du Monde (composer) 2004
- Neruda en el corazón - Victor Manuel (producer-arranger) 2004
- Por vos Muero - Miguel Bosé (producer-arranger) 2004
- Discover - Berklee College of Music (composer) 2002
- Encore Gala - Berklee College of Music (composer) 2001
