= Beatriz Spelzini =

Argentine actress

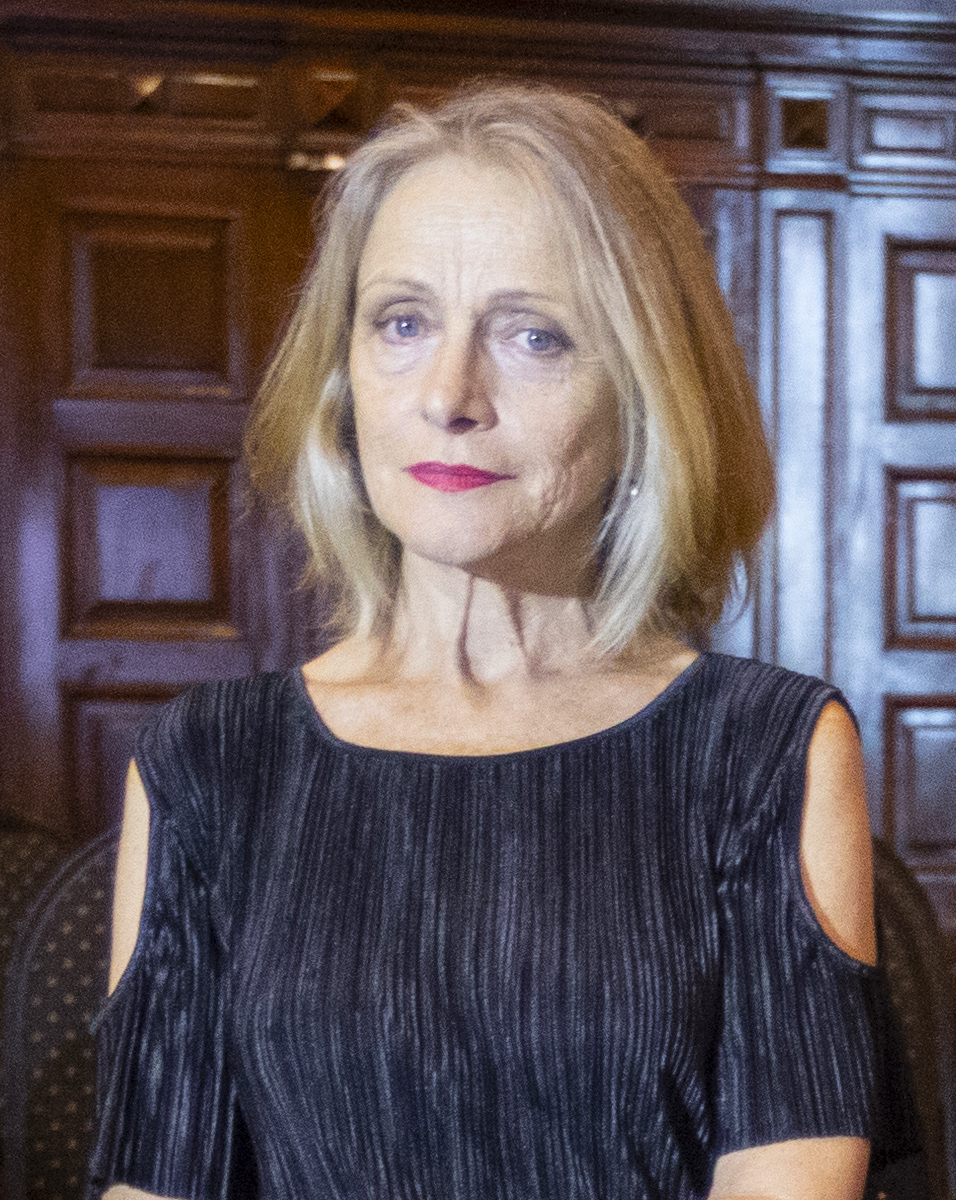

Beatriz Spelzini is an Argentinian actress. She has appeared in multiple films and television programs in Argentina as well as many European countries. Her film credits include The Day I Was Not Born (2011), Yo la recuerdo ahora and The Cat Vanishes. Television appearances include La Nada Blanca and Donne assassine.
