= Los Marziano =

- Film poster
- Directed by: Ana Katz; Adriana Vior
- Written by: Ana Katz; Daniel Katz
- Produced by: Oscar Kramer; Hugo Sigman
- Starring: Guillermo Francella; Arturo Puig; Mercedes Morán; Rita Cortese
- Cinematography: Julián Apezteguia
- Production companies: Kramer & Sigman Films
- Release date: September 2010
- Running time: 82 minutes
- Country: Argentina
- Language: Spanish

Los Marziano is a 2010 Argentine comedy-drama film co-written and directed by Ana Katz and starring Guillermo Francella, Arturo Puig, Mercedes Morán and Rita Cortese. The story centers on a reunion between two brothers after a long period of estrangement.

== Cast ==
- Arturo Puig
- Guillermo Francella
- María José Caracci
- Giuliana Carvo
- Ricardo Merkin

== Production ==
Filming began on February 15, 2010. It was the last film Oscar Kramer produced shortly before his death.

== Footnotes ==
- Charles Newbery, John Hopewell (December 8, 2009). "Francella to star in Katz's 'Marziano'. Argentine pic also features Puig, Corsese". Variety. Archived from the original on 2010-02-18.
- Lavallee, Eric (December 9, 2009). "Ana Katz Settles in 'Los Marziano'". Variety. Ioncinema.
- Lingenti, Alejandro (February 7, 2010). "El secreto de "Los Marziano"". Perfil (in Spanish). Argentina. Archived from the original on February 11, 2010.
- ""Los Marziano" lo nuevo de Ana Katz". Lente Creativo Gerónimo (in Spanish). November 15, 2009. Archived from the original on 18 February 2010.
- "La apuesta al cine". Los Andes (in Spanish). Argentina. 27 January 2010. Archived from the original on 18 February 2010.
