= Damián Szifron =

Argentine film director

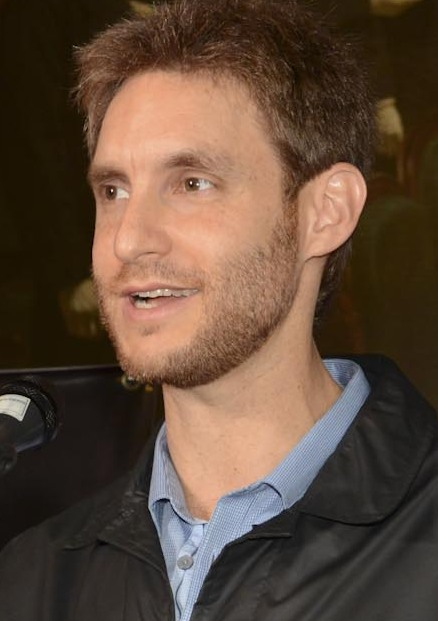
- Szifron in 2014
- Born: 9 July 1975 (age 51); Ramos Mejía, Argentina
- Occupations: Director; screenwriter
- Years active: 1992–present
- Spouse: María Marull

Damián Szifron (Argentine Spanish: [daˈmjan siˈfɾon]; born 9 July 1975) is an Argentine film and television director and screenwriter, best known as the creator of the TV series Los simuladores (2002), the most successful TV series in Argentina, and writer-director of Wild Tales (2014), the most successful film in Argentina. On 18 March 2022, Paramount announced a film based on Los simuladores, directed by Szifron, programmed for 2024.

== Biography ==
Born to a Jewish family, Szifron studied cinema with the film theory writer Angel Faretta. Szifron was the writer and director of Hermanos y detectives ("Brothers and Detectives"), the follow-up series to the hugely popular Los simuladores ("The Pretenders"). His 2014 film Wild Tales was selected to compete for the Palme d'Or in the main competition section at the 2014 Cannes Film Festival, nominated for the Best Foreign Language Film at the 87th Academy Awards and winner of both the BAFTA and Goya awards for Best Foreign Language Film.

== Filmography ==
=== Film ===
Year	Title	Director	Writer	Producer	Editor	Notes
2003	El fondo del mar	Yes	Yes	No	No	
2005	Tiempo de valientes	Yes	Yes	No	No	
2014	Relatos salvajes	Yes	Yes	No	Yes	
2023	To Catch a Killer	Yes	Yes	Yes	Yes	
TBA	Los simuladores	Yes	Yes	Yes	TBA	Pre-production; Based on his TV show Los simuladores

=== Short films ===
Year	Title	Director	Writer	Editor	Notes
1992	El tren	Yes	Yes	No	
1993	Río de culpas	Yes	Yes	No	
1995	Oídos sordos	Yes	Yes	No	Co-directed with Esteban Student
1997	Kan, el trueno	Yes	Yes	Yes	
1998	Punto muerto	Yes	Yes	No	Co-directed with Esteban Student
1999	Los últimos días	Yes	Yes	No	Medium-length film

== Television ==
Year	Title	Director	Writer	Editor	Notes
1996-1999	Atorrantes	No	No	Yes	Also producer
1999	PNP	No	No	Yes	
2002-2003	Los simuladores	Yes	Yes	Yes	Also creator
2006	Hermanos y detectives	Yes	Yes	Yes	TV Miniseries
