= The Last Train (2002 film) =

- Theatrical release poster
- Spanish: El último tren: Corazón de fuego
- Directed by: Diego Arsuaga
- Written by: Diego Arsuaga; Fernando León de Aranoa; Beda Docampo Feijóo
- Produced by: Pablo Bossi; Gerardo Herrero; Oscar Kramer; Carlos Mentasti
- Starring: Héctor Alterio; Federico Luppi; Pepe Soriano
- Cinematography: Hans Burman
- Edited by: Daniel Márquez; Fernando Pardo
- Music by: Nicolás Baraldi; Hugo Jasa
- Production companies: Patagonik Film Group; OK Films; Rambla Producciones; Taxi Films; Telefe; Tornasol Films
- Distributed by: Buena Vista International
- Release date: May 31, 2002 (Uruguay)
- Running time: 94 minutes
- Countries: Argentina; Spain; Uruguay
- Language: Spanish

The Last Train (Spanish: El último tren: Corazón de fuego) is a 2002 comedy-drama film directed by Diego Arsuaga and written by Arsuaga, Fernando León de Aranoa, and Beda Docampo Feijóo. It's also known as Corazón de fuego in Argentina.

The film's executive producer was Mariela Besuievski, and it was produced by Pablo Bossi, Gerardo Herrero, Oscar Kramer, and Carlos Mentasti.

== Synopsis ==
The film tells of an ambitious business man (Pauls) who wants to sell train 33, affectionately known as "Corazón de fuego," to a company in Hollywood. A group of elderly men known as "The Friends of the Rails" think that to do so would be to sell an important part of the country's history and so devise to steal the train.

The group of hijackers is led by "El Professor" (Alterio), and the train itself is driven by Pepe, who claims to have learned how to do so during the Spanish Civil War. The group is also accompanied by Dante Minetti (Soriano), who has Alzheimer's, and Guito, Pepe's neighbor/friend's nine-year-old great-nephew. The escapade takes the train all across the small country, exhibiting Uruguay's vibrant landscape and varied climate, also revealing many abandoned towns and train stops.

== Cast ==
- Héctor Alterio as El Profesor
- Federico Luppi as Pepe
- Pepe Soriano as Dante
- Gastón Pauls as Jimmy Ferreira
- Balaram Dinard as Guito
- Eduardo Miglionico as Ponce
- Elisa Contreras as Micaela
- Saturnino García as De León
- Jenny Goldstein as Notera
- Alfonso Tort as Daniel

== Distribution ==
The film was released wide in Uruguay May 31, 2002, and in Argentina on August 22, 2002.

The picture was screened at various film festivals, including: the Montréal World Film Festival, Canada; the Palm Springs International Film Festival, United States; the Cinémas d'Amérique Latine de Toulouse, France; the Copenhagen International Film Festival, Denmark; the Hamburg Film Festival, Germany; and others.

== Awards ==
Wins

- Montréal World Film Festival: Best Latin-American Feature Film, Diego Arsuaga; Best Screenplay, Diego Arsuaga; Prize of the Ecumenical Jury, Diego Arsuaga; 2002.
- Uruguayan Film Critics Association: UFCA Award; Best Uruguayan Film; 2002.
- Valladolid International Film Festival: Best Actor, Héctor Alterio, Federico Luppi, and José Soriano; Best New Director, Diego Arsuaga; 2002.
- Ariel Awards, Mexico: Silver Ariel; Best Latin-American Film, Uruguay; 2003.
- Goya Awards: Goya; Best Spanish Language Foreign Film, Diego Arsuaga, Uruguay; 2003.
- Gramado Film Festival: Audience Award Latin Film Competition, Diego Arsuaga; Special Jury Award Latin Film Competition, Diego Arsuaga; 2003.
- Lima Latin American Film Festival: Elcine Second Prize, Diego Arsuaga; 2003.

Nominations

- Montréal World Film Festival: Grand Prix des Amériques, Diego Arsuaga; 2002.
- Valladolid International Film Festival: Golden Spike, Diego Arsuaga; 2002.
- Argentine Film Critics Association Awards: Silver Condor, Best Actor, Héctor Alterio; Best Actor, José Soriano; Best Music, Hugo Jasa; 2003.
