= El perro =

- Theatrical release poster
- Directed by: Carlos Sorín
- Written by: Santiago Calori; Salvador Roselli; Carlos Sorín
- Produced by: Oscar Kramer; José María Morales
- Starring: Juan Villegas; Walter Donado
- Cinematography: Hugo Colace
- Edited by: Mohamed Rajid
- Music by: Nicolás Sorín
- Distributed by: Cinema Tropical; Guacamole Films
- Release date: September 23, 2004 (Argentina)
- Running time: 97 minutes
- Countries: Argentina; Spain
- Language: Spanish

El perro (English: Bombón: El Perro and Bombón: The Dog) is a 2004 Argentine-Spanish drama film, directed by Carlos Sorín, and written by Sorín, Santiago Calori, and Salvador Roselli. The picture features Juan Villegas and Walter Donado, among others.

The film was partly funded by INCAA.

El perro is a neo-realist fable about a man and a dog, the titular Bombón. Set in Patagonia, an unemployed man has his luck change after being given a Dogo Argentino dog for helping a stranded woman on the highway.

== Plot ==
Coco (Juan Villegas), the main character, is first seen trying to sell knives to a group of oil workers. He is a skilled craftsman, but the knives are too expensive for them. In fact, throughout the entire film, he never manages to sell a single knife, but he ends up giving two away: one to a security guard as a bribe, and one to a cabaret singer he meets on his journey.

Coco is down on his luck. He lives in a cramped apartment with his daughter and her children. As he is 52 years old, it looks increasingly unlikely that he will get another job. What he really wants is to work in a gas station, and during the first part of the film he is seen inquiring after such jobs.

Coco is a good natured man, despite his ill luck, and he is seen helping a woman on the road whose car has broken down. This good deed leads to him being given an Argentine Dogo as a gift. The dog is a pedigree and the woman supplies him with all the documents. Coco is bemused, but keeps the dog.

When he goes home, his daughter asks him to choose—her or the dog. He chooses to keep the dog. The film now becomes a road movie. Coco calls the dog "Lechien", mistakenly believing that this is his name, in fact it simply means "the dog" in French and was written on his kennel. Eventually Coco realizes the dog is called "Bombón."

From the moment he takes the dog, Coco's luck begins to change. People ask him to guard buildings with the dog; a chance meeting with the bank manager leads him to Walter, a trainer. Walter assures him that the dog is pure gold. After the dog wins third prize at a dog show an eager Walter begins to make arrangements to have him put out to stud, this promises to be lucrative for them both, but the dog is unable to perform.

Disillusioned, Walter takes the dog back to his ranch, and advises Coco to get settled somewhere and return for the dog later on.

But Coco feels lost without the dog, and returns to Walter's, only to find the dog has escaped. Upon finding the dog again, coupling with a stray female mutt, Coco sets off into a hopeful future with two young hitchhikers in tow.

== Cast ==
- Juan Villegas as Juan "Coco" Villegas
- Walter Donado as Walter Donado
- Gregorio as Le Chien aka Bombón
- Rosa Valsecchi as Susana
- Mariela Díaz as Coco's daughter
- Sabino Morales as Sabino, Coco's friend
- Claudina Fazzini as Claudina
- Kita Ca as Claudina's mother
- Carlos Rossi as Bank Manager
- Leda Cacho as Walter's wife
- Micol Estévez as Walter's daughter
- Diego Rozas Denis as Gelsi, Walter's friend
- Andrea Suárez as Hitchhiker
- Adrián Giampani as Galván
- Carlos Aguirre as Galván's boss

== Production ==
Casting

Carlos Sorín, in neo-realist fashion, used non-professional actors when he shot the film.

Filming locations

The picture was filmed in: Gaiman, Chubut; Patagonia; Río Gallegos, Santa Cruz; Trelew, Chubut Province; Tres Cerros, Patagonia; all in Argentina.

Distribution

The film was first presented at the Donostia-San Sebastián International Film Festival in September 2004. The same month the film made its North American debut at the Toronto International Film Festival on September 14, 2004.

In Argentina the film opened wide on September 23, 2004.

The picture was screened at various film festivals, including: the Nantes Festival of 3 Continents, France; the Cinémas d'Amérique Latine de Toulouse, France; the Hong Kong International Film Festival, China; the Muestra Internacional de Cine, Mexico; the Seattle International Film Festival, United States; and others.

== Reception ==
=== Critical response ===
A. O. Scott, film critic for The New York Times liked the film and wrote, "[the film was] flawlessly directed by Carlos Sorin...[Jose] is half-seduced by dreams of glory, but the film's real concern is dignity. Juan (Juan Villegas), is as modest a hero as you are likely to encounter on a movie screen, and neither he nor Mr. Sorin—or, for that matter, Lechien—have especially grandiose aspirations. That El perro is so unassuming is part of what makes its humane, sympathetic story so satisfying."

Ed Gonzalez thought highly of the film, and wrote, "The jewel in the crown of The Film Society of Lincoln Center's Latin Beat program last year was Carlos Sorín's El perro, which grabs the warm humanist baton from the director's Minimal Stories and heads straight for an existential finish line. With tender understatement, Sorín catalogs the depressing embarrassments an unemployed mechanic (Juan Villegas) is subjected to when he's unable to secure work or earn money for his homemade knives."

The review aggregator Rotten Tomatoes reported that 83% of critics gave the film a positive review, based on twelve reviews.

=== Awards ===
Wins

- Donostia-San Sebastián International Film Festival: FIPRESCI Prize, Carlos Sorín; 2004.
