= The Cat Vanishes =

2011 film

- Directed by: Carlos Sorín
- Written by: Nicolás Grosso
- Starring: Luis Luque; Beatriz Spelzini
- Cinematography: Julián Apezteguia
- Music by: Nicolás Sorín
- Release date: 21 April 2011
- Running time: 90 minutes
- Country: Argentina
- Language: Spanish

The Cat Vanishes (Spanish: El gato desaparece) is a 2011 Argentine psychological drama suspense film written and directed by Carlos Sorín.

== Synopsis ==
A college professor (Luque) returns to his home life after being hospitalized following a violent nervous breakdown, but his joy is clouded by unforeseen problems with his once loving wife (Spelzini), who is now scared of him, as well as his once sweet but now ornery and elusive cat Donatello, who suddenly vanishes from the household.

== Cast ==
- Luis Luque as Prof. Luis Romero
- Beatriz Spelzini as Beatriz Romero
- María Abadi as Verónica Romero
- Norma Argentina as Ángela, the housekeeper
