= Paula Hernández =

Argentine film director

- Born: 16 October 1969 (age 56); Argentina
- Occupations: Film director, screenwriter
- Years active: 1997-present

Paula Hernández (born 16 October 1969) is an Argentine film director and screenwriter. She has directed seven films since 1997. Her 2001 film Inheritance was entered into the 23rd Moscow International Film Festival.

== Selected filmography ==
- Inheritance (2001)
- Lluvia (2008) a.k.a. Rain
- Un amor (2011) a.k.a. One Love
- The Sleepwalkers (2019)
