= Inheritance (2001 film) =

2001 film

- Directed by: Paula Hernández
- Written by: Paula Hernández
- Produced by: Rolo Azpeitia
- Starring: Rita Cortese
- Cinematography: Víctor González
- Release dates: June 2001 (Moscow); 20 June 2002 (Argentina)
- Running time: 90 minutes
- Country: Argentina
- Language: Spanish

Inheritance (Spanish: Herencia) is a 2001 Argentine drama film directed by Paula Hernández. It was entered into the 23rd Moscow International Film Festival.

== Cast ==
- Rita Cortese as Olinda
- Adrián Witzke as Peter
- Martín Adjemián as Federico
- Julieta Díaz as Luz
- Héctor Anglada as Ángel
- Eduardo Cutuli as Tito (as Cutuli)
- Carlos Portaluppi as Raúl
- Graciela Tenenbaum as Elsa
- Ernesto Claudio as Hombre Inmobiliaria
- Damián Dreizik as Hombre Ketchup
