= The Road to San Diego =

- Theatrical release poster
- French: El camino de San Diego
- Directed by: Carlos Sorín
- Written by: Carlos Sorín
- Produced by: Oscar Kramer; Hugo Sigman; Carlos Sorín
- Starring: Ignacio Benítez; Carlos Wagner
- Cinematography: Hugo Colace
- Edited by: Mohamed Rajid
- Music by: Nicolás Sorín
- Production companies: K&S Films; Guacamole Films
- Distributed by: 20th Century Fox
- Release date: September 14, 2006 (Argentina)
- Running time: 98 minutes
- Country: Argentina
- Language: Spanish

The Road to San Diego (French: El camino de San Diego) is a 2006 Argentine comedy film, written and directed by Carlos Sorín. The film features Ignacio Benítez and Carlos Wagner, among others.

The picture tells the story of an Argentine obsessed with football superstar Diego Maradona.

== Plot ==
Tati Benítez (Ignacio Benítez), is a young man who lives in the Misiones Province, and an Argentine lumberjack who's been laid off at work, now making a living by collecting wood for an artisan named Silva (Miguel Gonzales Colman). Benítez is married to his pregnant wife (Paola Rotela).

Typical of Argentines, Tati is a football fanatic. Tati is quite quirky and, like many Argentines, is obsessed with the Argentine football player Diego Armando Maradona, who is legendary in Argentina because of his prowess in the World Cup. He wears a football kit with Maradona's number 10 on it and has a very large 10 tattooed on his back. He even owns two parrots who scream "Maradona" from time to time. His friends joke that Tati is not married to his wife, but to Maradona. In fact, Tati knows every possible statistic of Maradona's career, and has a great deal of knowledge regarding his hero's life.

One day Tati hears from friends that Maradona is suffering from heart problems, so he decides to go on a quest.

His mission is to deliver an unusual piece of wood to Maradona at the Swiss-Argentine Hospital in Buenos Aires where he is recuperating. The piece of wood resembles Maradona.

Tati travels by foot, by bus, and even by ambulance, to let Maradona feel the dedication and love of his loyal fan base.

On his way he runs into many adventures.

== Cast ==
- Ignacio Benítez as Tati Benítez
- Carlos Wagner La Bella as Waguinho
- Paola Rotela as Tati's wife
- Silvina Fontelles as Ms. Matilde
- Miguel González Colman as Silva, the artisan
- José Armónico as Gauna
- Toti Rivas as El Tolo
- Marisa Córdoba as El Tolo's wife
- Otto Mosdien as Pastor Otto
- Claudio Uassouf as a priest
- Lila Cáceres as a young mother
- Pascual Condito as Pascual
- Juan Villegas as Photo Shop Owner
- Walter Donado as an ambulance driver
- Aníbal Maldonado as a contrabandist
- Jose Wisniewsky as El Polaco

== Background ==
Casting
Carlos Sorín, in neo-realist fashion, used non-professional actors when he shot the film.

Filming locations
The picture was filmed in Misiones, Argentina.

== Distribution ==
The film opened in Argentina on September 14, 2006.

The picture was presented at the Donostia-San Sebastián International Film Festival, Spain.

The movie has been screened at a few film festivals, including: the Spanish and Latin American Film Festival, Ireland; and others.

== Critical reception ==
Álvaro Sanjurjo Toucon, in a scholarly analysis of the film and Carlos Sorín's other works for FIPRESCI, had positive things to say of the picture. He summarized: "Sorín skillfully combines documentary footage of an unreflective, probably self-destructive, Maradona with the scenes involving the young man...sport hasn't been a major theme in Argentine movies, even though it is a significant part of the national identity. Sorín's films highlights the value of his work. In the same way in which we can watch a match from different perspectives depending on where we are seated, The Road to San Diego can be interpreted from various points of view. One has just to choose one of the many perspectives offered by the great filmmaker who is Carlos Sorin."

Deborah Young, writing for Variety magazine, liked the film and wrote, "Carlos Sorín's delightfully offbeat Road to San Diego, about a young backwoodsman with a Diego Maradona fetish, is another audience-friendly addition to the director's repertoire."

== Awards ==
Wins

- San Sebastián International Film Festival: Special Prize of the Jury; Carlos Sorin; 2006.
- Havana Film Festival: Grand Coral - Second Prize, Carlos Sorin; 2006.

Nominations

- San Sebastián International Film Festival: Golden Seashell; Carlos Sorin; 2006.
