= Guacamole Films =

Film production company from Argentina

Guacamole Films is a film production company in Buenos Aires, Argentina.

The firm is known for producing award-winning films and has taken all of their films to film festivals around the world. The company is one of the production companies that is helping fuel the "New Argentine Film" wave movement.

== Filmography ==
- Historias Mínimas (2002)
- El Perro (2004)
- 18-J (2004)
- El Camino de San Diego (2006)
