= Rita Cortese =

Argentine actress

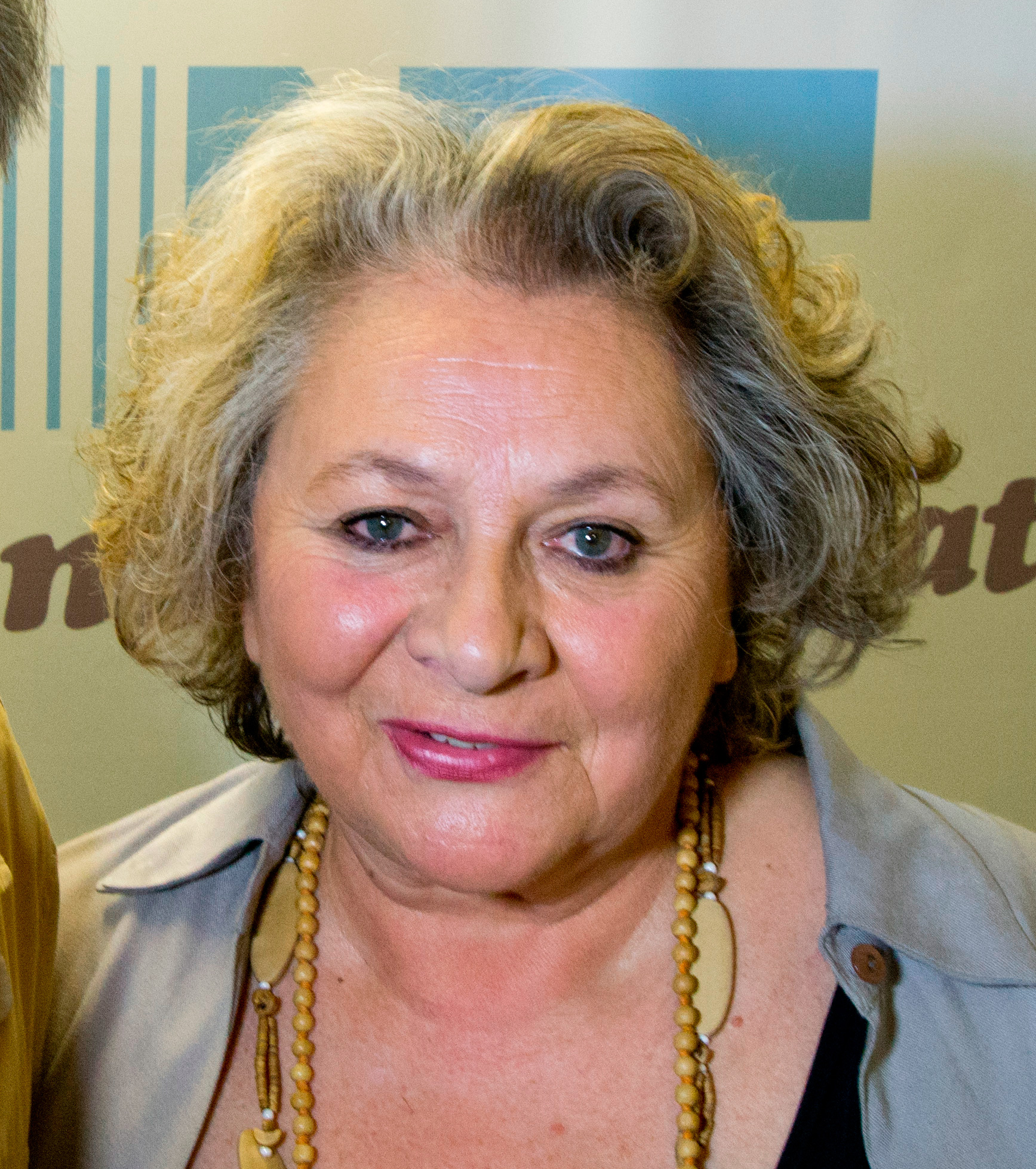
- Cortese in 2014
- Born: Adela Rita Cortese; 5 August 1949 (age 77); Buenos Aires, Argentina
- Occupations: Actress; singer
- Years active: 1972–present

Adela Rita Cortese (born 5 August 1949) is an Argentine theatre, film, and television actress and singer. She is considered one of the best actresses of Argentina.

== Life and career ==
Cortese was born in Buenos Aires on 5 August 1949. She is of Spanish and Italian descent. In 1967, she started studying Philosophy and Letters, but dropped out a year later. She began studying acting at 24 years old in 1973 with professor Néstor Raimondi, and later with Carlos Gandolfo, two of the "four great acting teachers" of the time. She was also a student of theatre director Roberto Villanueva, who directed her in multiple plays.

Her first professional role was in the play Marathón (1980), written by Ricardo Monti and directed by Jaime Kogan. In the 1980s, Cortese was part of the Argentine Open Theatre, an independent theatre movement in resistance of the 1976–83 civil–military dictatorship in Argentina.

Typically a supporting actress, she had her first lead role in a feature film in Inheritance, released in Argentina in 2002.

== Personal life ==
Cortese resides in the Monserrat neighbourhood in Buenos Aires.

== Credits ==
=== Film ===
- Asesinato en el Senado de la Nación (1984)
- La República perdida II (1986)
- A Wall of Silence (1993)
- Ashes of Paradise (1997)
- Momentos robados (1997)
- El sueño de los héroes (1997)
- Cohen vs. Rosi (1998)
- La nube (1998)
- Alma mía (1999)
- Apariencias (2000)
- Inheritance (2001)
- ¿Y dónde está el bebé? (2002)
- Samy y yo (2002)
- ¿Sabés nadar? (2002)
- Monobloc (2005)
- Familia Lugones (2007)
- Horizontal/vertical (2009)
- Brother and Sister (2010)
- Los Marziano (2010)
- Widows (2011)
- Verdades verdaderas (2011)
- Wild Tales (2014)
- Heroic Losers (2019)
- Bruja (2019)
- Las siamesas (2020)
- La sombra del gato (2021)
- Un crimen argentino (2022)
- The Substitute (2022)
- Most People Die on Sundays (Los domingos mueren más personas) - 2024

=== Television ===
- Corazones de fuego (1992)
- Alta comedia (1993–1994)
- Los especiales de Doria (1996)
- R.R.D.T. (1997)
- Señoras y señores (1997)
- Laura y Zoe (1998)
- Verano del '98 (1999–2000)
- El sodero de mi vida (2001–2002)
- Mil millones (2002)
- Costumbres argentinas (2003)
- Malandras (2003)
- Sol negro (2003)
- Los secretos de papá (2004)
- Sin código (2005)
- Montecristo (2006)
- Lalola (2007)
- Reparaciones (2007)
- Mujeres asesinas 4 (2008)
- Scusate il disturbo (2009)
- Mitos, crónicas del amor descartable (2009)
- Botineras (2010)
- Tiempo para pensar (2011)
- Volver a nacer (2012)
- Graduados (2012)
- El hombre de tu vida (2012)
- La viuda de Rafael (2012)
- Esa mujer (2013)
- Historias de corazón (2013)
- Doce casas, Historia de mujeres devotas (2013)
- Escuela nocturna (2014)
- Esperanza mía (2015)
- El jardín de bronce (2017)
- Maradona: Blessed Dream (2021)
- The Best Heart Attack of My Life (2025)

== Accolades ==
Organizations (Note: Awards, festivals, honors and other miscellaneous organizations are listed in alphabetical order.)	Year (Note: Year in which award ceremony was held.)	Category	Work	Result	Ref.
Amiens International Film Festival	2001	Best Actress	Inheritance	Won	
Argentine Academy of Cinematography Arts and Sciences	2011	Best Supporting Actress	Los Marziano	Nominated	
Argentine Academy of Cinematography Arts and Sciences	2014	Best Actress	Wild Tales	Nominated	
Argentine Film Critics Association	2003	Best Actress	Inheritance	Won	
Argentine Film Critics Association	2012	Best Supporting Actress	Los Marziano	Nominated	
Argentine Film Critics Association	2015	Best Supporting Actress	Wild Tales	Nominated	
Argentine Film Critics Association	2021	Best Actress	Las siamesas	Nominated	
Clarín Entertainment Awards	2002	Best Actress – Film	Inheritance	Nominated	
Martín Fierro Awards	2001	Best Supporting Actress	El sodero de mi vida	Won	
Martín Fierro Awards	2003	Best Supporting Actress	Sol negro	Nominated	
Martín Fierro Awards	2005	Supporting Actress in a Comedy Program	Sin código	Won	
Martín Fierro Awards	2007	Best Guest Appearance	Lalola	Won	
Miami International Film Festival	2003	Best Actress	Inheritance	Won	
Ourense Independent Film Festival	2001	Best Actress	Inheritance	Won	
Viña del Mar International Film Festival	2001	Best Actress	Inheritance	Won	
