= Carlos Sorín =

Argentine filmmaker

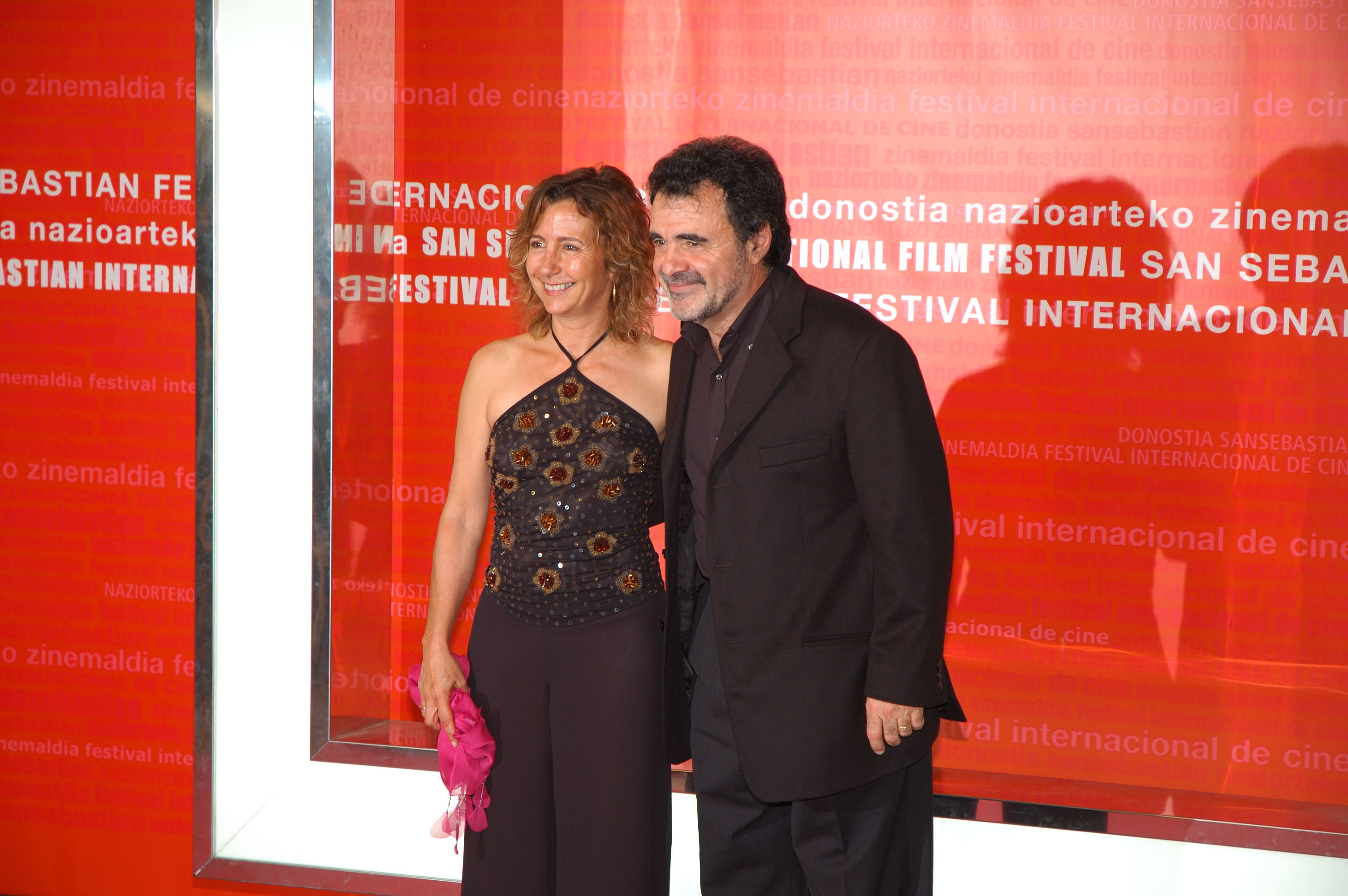
Carlos Sorín (right)

Carlos Sorín (born 1944 in Buenos Aires, Argentina) is a film director, screenplay writer, cinematographer, and film producer. He works mainly in the cinema of Argentina.

== Filmography ==
- A King and His Movie (La Película del rey), 1986
- Eversmile, New Jersey (Eterna sonrisa de New Jersey), 1989
- Intimate Stories (Historias mínimas), 2002
- El Perro, 2004
- 18-J, 2004
- The Road to San Diego (El Camino de San Diego), 2006
- The Window (La Ventana), 2009
- The Cat Vanishes (El gato desaparece), 2011
- Gone Fishing (Días de pesca), 2012

== Television ==
- Manos libres - El caso del bebé de los Perales (2005) (Mini TV Series)
- Ensayo (2003) Canal 7 Argentina - Documentary: Casting for a TV series
- La era del ñandú (1987) Documental Apócrifo - Canal 13 Argentina
