= Martín Adjemián =

Argentine actor

- Born: December 12, 1932; Buenos Aires, Argentina
- Died: January 3, 2006 (aged 73)

Martín Adjemián (December 12, 1932 – January 3, 2006) was an Argentine film and television actor of Armenian descent. He worked in the cinema of Argentina.

He died on January 3, 2006, of cancer.

In 1988, he appeared in Asesinato a distancia.

One of his most recent role was in the critically acclaimed film La Ciénaga (2001).

== Filmography (partial) ==
- Invasión (1969).
- Adela (2000) as Enríquez
- La Ciénaga (2001) a.k.a. The Swamp
- Gallito Ciego (2001)
- Herencia (2001) a.k.a. Inheritance
- Potestad (2002)
- Palermo Hollywood (2004)
- Tiempo de valientes (2005)
- La Perrera (2006) a.k.a. The Dog Pound

== Television (partial) ==
- 1000 millones (2002) TV Series a.k.a. Love Heritage
- Sol negro (2003) (Mini TV Series)
- Sangre fría (2004) (Mini TV Series)
