= Hugo Colace (cinematographer) =

Argentine film cinematographer

Hugo Colace (born December 3, 1953, in Buenos Aires) is an Argentine film cinematographer. Three of his most recent films have been critically well received: La Ciénaga (2001), Historias mínimas (2002), and 18-j (2004).

== Filmography (partial) ==
- Abierto de 18 a 24 (1988) a.k.a. Open from 18 to 24
- Las Boludas (1993) a.k.a. After all it's Only Life
- El Dedo en la llaga (1996) a.k.a. The Salt in the Wound
- Secretos compartidos (1998)
- Operación Fangio (1999)
- Nueces para el amor (2000) a.k.a. Nuts for Love
- La Ciénaga (2001) a.k.a. The Swamp
- Déjala correr (2001)
- Historias mínimas (2002) a.k.a. Intimate Stories
- El juego de Arcibel (2003) a.k.a. Arcibel's Game
- El Perro (2004) a.k.a. Bombón: El Perro
- 18-j (2004)
- Condón Express (2005)
- El Camino de San Diego (2006) a.k.a. The Road to San Diego
- Una Estrella y dos cafés (2006)
