= Intimate Stories =

2002 film by Carlos Sorín

Historias mínimas
- Theatrical release poster
- Directed by: Carlos Sorín
- Written by: Pablo Solarz
- Produced by: Martin Bardi
- Starring: Javier Lombardo; Antonio Benedicti; Javiera Bravo
- Cinematography: Hugo Colace
- Edited by: Mohamed Rajid
- Music by: Nicolás Sorín
- Distributed by: Guacamole Films
- Release dates: 26 September 2002 (Spain); 24 October 2002 (Argentina); January 2003 (United States)
- Running time: 92 minutes
- Countries: Argentina; Spain
- Language: Spanish

Intimate Stories (Spanish: Historias mínimas) is a 2002 Argentine-Spanish drama film directed by Carlos Sorín and written by Pablo Solarz. The film was produced by Martin Bardi, Leticia Cristi, and José María Morales. It features, among others, Javier Lombardo, Antonio Benedicti and Javiera Bravo.

This road movie chronicles three individual yet intertwined stories of ordinary people striving to follow their dreams in life. The picture unfolds in the southern Argentine region of Patagonia, and it was filmed in the Santa Cruz Province, Patagonia. The film captures many small details that make a realistic and moving depiction of life in southern Argentina.

== Synopsis ==
The story follows three different persons travelling the Argentine Patagonia. The first is Don Justo, an elderly man who hands over the running of his grocery store to his overbearing son and daughter-in-law and escapes to search for his lost dog, named Badface. The second, Roberto, is a love-struck obsessive-compulsive traveling salesman who drives to San Julián, to surprise one of his clients by bringing a cake for her child's birthday. Finally, María Flores is a lower class woman who travels to San Julián with her daughter because she has won a spot on "Multicoloured Casino", a fusty TV game show.

== Cast ==
- Javier Lombardo as Roberto
- Antonio Benedicti as Don Justo Benedictis
- Javiera Bravo as María Flores
- Julia Solomonoff as Julia
- Laura Vagnoni as Estela
- Enrique Otranto as Carlos
- Mariela Díaz as María's friend
- María Rosa Cianferoni as Ana
- María del Carmen Jiménez as Female Baker
- César García as García
- Armando Grimaldi as El mesero
- Mario Splanguño as Panadero
- Rosa Valsecchi as Panadera #2
- Aníbal Maldonado as Fermín

== Production ==
=== Casting ===
In a neo-realist fashion, the film director used mostly non-professional actors; the only professional actor was Javier Lombardo (Roberto).

== Distribution ==
The film was first presented at the Donostia-San Sebastián International Film Festival, Spain on September 26, 2002, and was released in Argentina on October 24, 2002.

It was featured at various film festivals, including the International Film Festival Rotterdam; the Latin America Film Festival, Poland; the Karlovy Vary Film Festival, Czech Republic; the Copenhagen International Film Festival, Denmark; the Bergen International Film Festival, Norway; the Spanish Film Festival, Philippines; Havana Film Festival, Cuba; the Cartagena Film Festival, Colombia; the Festróia - Tróia International Film Festival, Portugal; the Fribourg International Film Festival, Switzerland; the Tromsø International Film Festival, Norway, and the Uruguay International Film Festival, Uruguay.

In the United States it was shown at the Sundance Film Festival in January, 2003, then released in New York City on March 4, 2005.

== Critical reception ==
Tom Dawson, film critic for the BBC wrote, "Patagonian landscapes with the modesty of his characters' aspirations, Sorín has crafted an appealing portrait of this remote region, where television provides the inhabitants with their main link to the wider world. Convincingly acted by the mainly non-professional cast, Historias mínimas is further proof of the diversity and strength of contemporary Argentine cinema."

Ed Gonzales, a critic for Slant Magazine, liked Carlos Sorín's directorial work, and the film reminded him of some well-regarded American directors: "It's the film's crisscrossing narrative and sense of community that brings to mind Altman's Short Cuts, but the pursuit of enlightenment and the poetic texture of Sorín's images similarly evokes Lynch's The Straight Story. Quiet and unpretentious, the film's humanism isn't confrontational exactly but it's intense nonetheless."

== Awards ==
Wins

- Donostia-San Sebastián International Film Festival: FIPRESCI Prize – Special Mention (Carlos Sorín); SIGNIS Award – Special Mention (Carlos Sorín); and Special Prize of the Jury (Carlos Sorín); 2002.
- Havana Film Festival: Grand Coral – Second Prize (Carlos Sorín); Martin Luther King Memorial Center Award (Carlos Sorín); 2002.
- Argentine Film Critics Association Awards: Silver Condor for best director (Carlos Sorín); Best Film; Best Music (Nicolás Sorín); Best Male (Antonio Benedicti); Best Original Script (Pablo Solarz); Best Artistic Direction (Margarita Jusid); Best Cinematography (Hugo Colace); and Best Sound (Carlos Abbate and José Luis Díaz); 2003.
- Cartagena Film Festival: Special Jury Prize (Carlos Sorín); 2003.
- Festróia - Tróia International Film Festival: Golden Dolphin (Carlos Sorín); 2003.
- Fribourg International Film Festival: Grand Prix (Carlos Sorín); 2003.
- Los Angeles Latino International Film Festival: Best Film; 2003.
- Tromsø International Film Festival: Aurora Award – Special Mention (Carlos Sorín); 2003.
- Uruguay International Film Festival: Best Film; 2003.
- Uruguayan Film Critics Association Awards 2003: Best Latinamerican film; 2003.
- Goya Awards: Best foreign Spanish language film; 2004.

Nominations

- San Sebastián International Film Festival: Golden Seashell, Carlos Sorín; 2002.
- Argentine Film Critics Association Awards: Silver Condor, Best Editing, Mohamed Rajid; Best New Actress, Javiera Bravo; Best New Actress, Julia Solomonoff; Best Supporting Actor, Javier Lombardo; 2003.
- Cartagena Film Festival: Golden India Catalina, Best Film, Carlos Sorín; 2003.
- Ariel Awards, Mexico: Silver Ariel, Best Latin-American Film, Carlos Sorín, Argentina; 2004.
