= After All It's Only Life =

1993 film directed by Víctor Dínenzon

Las Boludas
- Directed by: Víctor Dínenzon
- Written by: Víctor Dínenzon; Dalmiro Sáenz
- Produced by: Víctor Dínenzon
- Starring: Gerardo Romano
- Cinematography: Hugo Colace
- Edited by: Norberto Rapado
- Music by: Litto Nebbia
- Distributed by: Argentina Video Home
- Release date: 5 August 1993
- Country: Argentina
- Language: Spanish

After All It's Only Life (Spanish: Las Boludas) is a 1993 Argentine comedy film directed and written by Víctor Dínenzon and written by José Ángel Esteban. The film stars Gerardo Romano. It premiered on 5 August 1993 in Buenos Aires.

== Plot ==
Three women ridiculed by their spouses glide to take revenge themselves with the intention to demonstrate to them that they are quite different from what is being portrayed.

== Cast ==
- Gerardo Romano
- Héctor Alterio
- Sandra Ballesteros
- Michèle Duquet
- Rodolfo Ranni
- Rubén Stella
- Cora Sanchez
- Claudia Nicola
- Ernesto Larrese

== Reception ==
Roberto Pagés in El Amante del Cine wrote: "Is it stupid or smart to stage all the common places of the medium as if they were revealed truths?" while Claudio España, in La Nación found: "Many words in a comedy without euphemisms."

Daniel López in La Razón, wrote; "Unusual feminist approach that... Dinenzon takes to its ultimate consequences, although along the way he must allow his camera to linger for a long time on the naked bodies of these women, in the best macho style that the film itself condemns."
