= Gone Fishing (2012 film) =

2012 film

- Directed by: Carlos Sorín
- Written by: Carlos Sorín
- Produced by: Carlos Sorín
- Starring: Victoria Almeida
- Cinematography: Julián Apezteguia
- Release date: 7 September 2012 (TIFF)
- Running time: 78 minutes
- Country: Argentina
- Language: Spanish

Gone Fishing (Spanish: Días de pesca) is a 2012 Argentine drama film directed by Carlos Sorín.

== Cast ==
- Victoria Almeida
- Alejandro Awada
