= On Probation (2005 film) =

- Theatrical release poster
- Spanish: Tiempo de valientes
- Directed by: Damián Szifron
- Written by: Damián Szifrón; Agustín Rolandelli; Nicolás Smudt
- Produced by: Oscar Kramer; Hugo Sigman
- Starring: Luis Luque; Diego Peretti
- Cinematography: Lucio Bonelli
- Edited by: Alberto Ponce
- Music by: Guillermo Guareschi
- Production companies: 20th Century Fox Argentina; Chemo; INCAA; Kramer & Sigman Films; OK Films; Shok Films Argentina
- Distributed by: 20th Century Fox
- Release date: 29 September 2005 (Argentina)
- Running time: 112 minutes
- Country: Argentina
- Language: Spanish

On Probation (Spanish: Tiempo de valientes: "A Time for the Brave") is a 2005 Argentine crime comedy film written and directed by Damián Szifrón and starring Diego Peretti and Luis Luque. Contributing writers for the film were Agustín Rolandelli and Nicolás Smudt. It was produced by Oscar Kramer and Hugo Sigman.

The film is considered an Argentine entry in the buddy-cop adventure subgenre.

== Synopsis ==
Alfredo Díaz (Luis Luque) is a cop who falls into depression after discovering that his wife has been cheating on him. Mariano Silverstein (Diego Peretti), a psychologist assigned by the force, tries to help Alfredo deal with his problem.

When Alfredo is invited to dinner to Silverstein's home, he unmasks Silverstein's wife, who also has an affair, which causes the psychologist and the cop to switch roles. Díaz takes Silverstein with him on many adventures as both begin to unravel a criminal conspiracy of national proportions.

== Cast ==
- Luis Luque as Inspector Alfredo Díaz
- Diego Peretti as Licenciado Mariano Silverstein
- Martín Adjemián as Comisario
- Ernesto Claudio as Lomianto
- Oscar Ferreiro as Lebonian
- Gabriela Iscovich as Diana
- Tony Lestingi as Arias
- Dulio Orso as Radamés
- Carlos Portaluppi as Villegas
- Hilario Quinteros as Alfredo Gauto
- Marcelo Sein as Farina
- Daniel Valenzuela as Pontrémoli

== Distribution ==
The film opened wide in Argentina on September 29, 2005.

It was shown at film festivals, including: the Málaga Film Festival, Spain; the Indie - World Film Festival, Brazil; the Villeurbanne Festival Reflets du cinéma ibérique et Latino-américain, France; and others.

== Critical reception ==
Variety magazine film critic Jonathan Holland, liked the film although he had a few problems with the latter part of the film. He wrote, "A well-scripted and played Argentine buddy movie that generates fine comedy and decent thrills from an engagingly offbeat premise, On Probation is a surprising pleasure. Though things fall apart somewhat in the final reels, the solid work early on sees pic through successfully. Probation did good business at home following its September 2005 release, followed by unexpectedly healthy Spanish B.O. in 2006, suggesting pic could walk free in selected offshore markets beyond the Hispanic, with a cult following via fest play likely."

== Awards ==
Wins

- Málaga Spanish Film Festival, Málaga, Spain: Silver Biznaga; Best Latin American Actor, Luis Luque; 2006.
- Peñíscola Comedy Film Festival, Peñíscola, Spain: Best Actor, Diego Peretti; Best Director, Damián Szifron; Best Film, Damián Szifron; 2006.
- Biarritz International Festival of Latin American Cinema, Biarritz, France: Audience Award, Damián Szifron; 2006.

Nominations

- Argentine Film Critics Association Awards: Best Actor, Luis Luque; Best Actor, Diego Peretti; Best Cinematography, Lucio Bonelli; Best Director, Damián Szifron; Best Editing, Alberto Ponce; Best Film; Best Music, Guillermo Guareschi; Best Original Screenplay, Damián Szifron, Agustín Rolandelli, and Nicolás Smudt; Best Sound, Fernando Soldevila; 2006.
