= Oscar Kramer =

Argentine film producer

Oscar Kramer (25 May 1935 – 7 April 2010) was an Argentine film producer. He was born in Buenos Aires. He worked in the cinema of Argentina when he was young. In the 1970s he lived in Antwerp, Belgium, where he worked in the diamond industry. After a few decades, in the 1980s he returned to Argentina with his wife and son to direct films.

== Filmography ==
- Eversmile, New Jersey (1989)
- Alambrado (1991) a.k.a. Barbed Wire
- La Peste (1992) a.k.a. The Plague
- De eso no se habla (1993) a.k.a. I Don't Want to Talk About It
- Corazón iluminado (1996) a.k.a. Foolish Heart
- The Tango Lesson (1997)
- El Impostor (1997) a.k.a. The Impostor
- Plata quemada (2000) a.k.a. Burnt Money
- Kamchatka (2002)
- El Último tren (2002) a.k.a. The Last Train
- Carandiru (2003)
- El Perro (2004) a.k.a. Bombón: El Perro
- Tiempo de valientes (2005)
- El Camino de San Diego (2006) a.k.a. The Road to San Diego
- Crónica de una fuga (2006) a.k.a. Chronicle of an Escape
- El Pasado (2007) a.k.a. The Past
- Los Marziano (2011)
