= Juan Villegas =

Argentine film actor and director

Juan Villegas is an Argentine film actor and director.

He won praise for his acting performance in the film El Perro (2004), and was nominated for an Argentine Film Critics Association Awards in 2004.

Villegas works in the cinema of Argentina.

== Filmography ==
- Savage Roses (2002) a.k.a. Locas 4 Life
- El Perro (2004) a.k.a. Bombón: El Perro
- El Camino de San Diego (2006) a.k.a. The Road to San Diego

== Awards ==
Nominations

- Argentine Film Critics Association Awards: Silver Condor; Best New Actor, for: El Perro; (2004).
