= Buenos Aires International Festival of Independent Cinema =

Annual film festival in Buenos Aires, Argentina

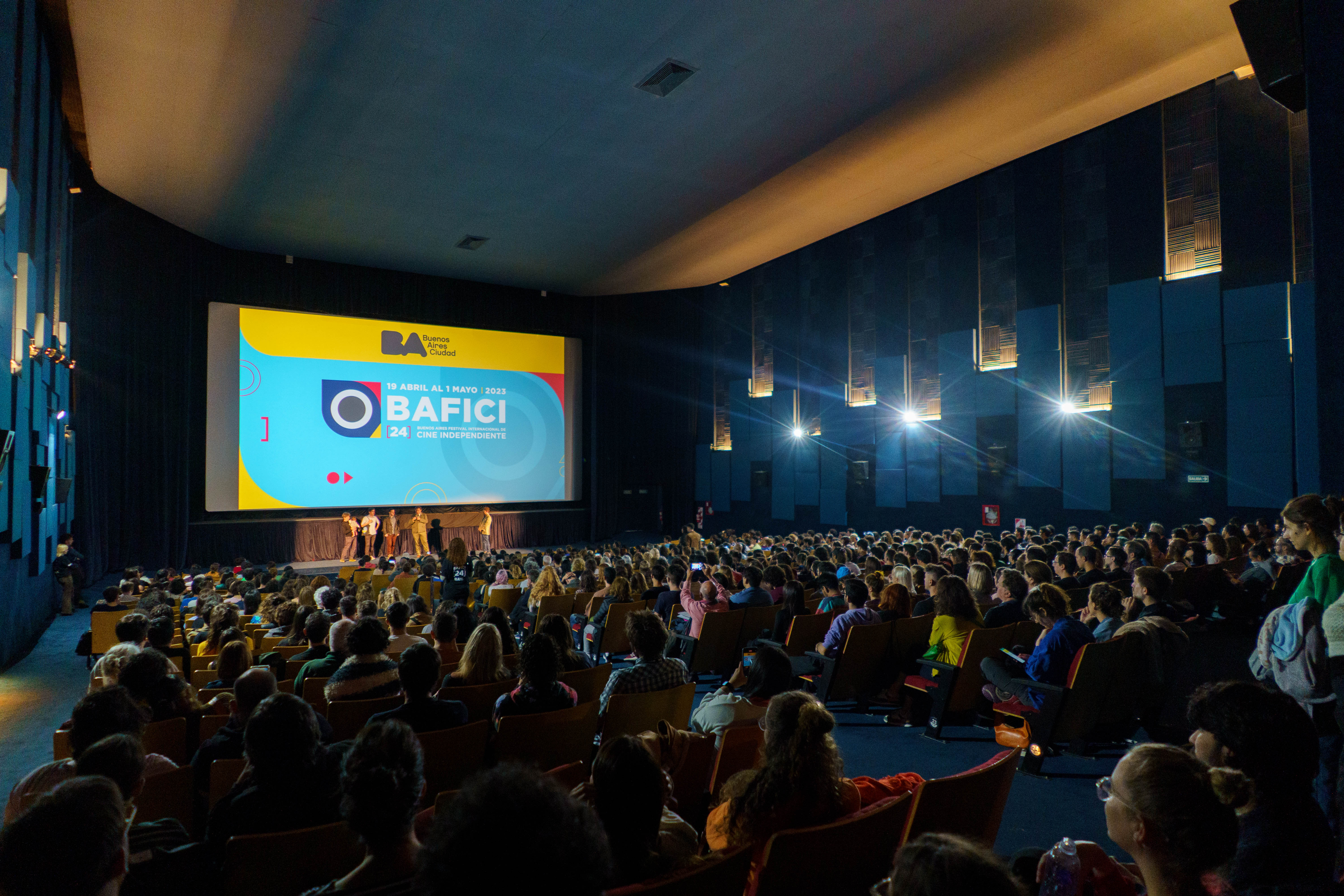
- BAFICI 2023
- Location: Buenos Aires, Argentina
- Founded: 1999
- Website: bafici.org

The Buenos Aires International Festival of Independent Cinema (BAFICI, Spanish: Buenos Aires Festival Internacional de Cine Independiente) is an international festival of independent films organized each year in the city of Buenos Aires, Argentina.

== History ==
The festival had its first edition in April 1999 and it was organized by the Secretaryship of Culture of the Government of Buenos Aires City. The festival is held in the most important movie theatres of Buenos Aires, but also feature free open-air screenings in parks and squares all over the city.

In the first year the festival had 146 guests, among them Francis Ford Coppola, Todd Haynes, Paul Morrissey and others. That year the festival screened more than 150 national and international films and had approximately 120,000 spectators. Since then, the festival has been growing, reaching an audience of 1.1 million spectators in the 2013 edition.

Nowadays, the BAFICI feature more than 400 films, several activities were added over the years and many conferences and workshops are held every year. With a great number of spectators and guests, the festival is permanently added into the Buenos Aires list of cultural events. The festival is managed by the Ministry of Culture of the City of Buenos Aires.

In 2024, MovieMaker named it one of the "25 Coolest Film Festivals in the World".

== Awards ==
The festival has several competitive sections of which the "International Competition" and the "Argentinian Competition" are the most important ones. Inside each competitive section a jury evaluates the films and select the winners of several awards, including: Best Film, Best Director, Best Actor, Best Actress and Special Mentions. In the BAFICI the audiences vote, the feature-length film with the highest ratings given by the audience receives the Audience Award.

Since the third edition of the festival, there have been awards given to short films, which include Best Short Subject Film and Best Director.

=== Winners: International Competition - Grand Prize ===
Year	Film	Original title	Director	Country
1999	After Life	Wandafuru Raifu	Hirokazu Koreeda	Japan
2000	Human Resources	Ressources humaines	Laurent Cantet	France
2001	Platform	Zhantai	Jia Zhangke	China
2002	Sailing Home	Tornando a casa	Vincenzo Marra	Italy
2003	Waiting for Happiness	Heremakono	Abderrahmane Sissako	Mauritania
2004	Pin Boy	Parapalos	Ana Poliak	Argentina
2005	The Sky Turns	El Cielo Gira	Mercedes Álvarez	Spain
2006	In the Pit	En el Hoyo	Juan Carlos Rulfo	Mexico
2007	In Between Days	방황의 날들	So Yong Kim	South Korea
2008	Intimidades de Shakespeare y Víctor Hugo		Yulene Olaizola	Mexico
2009	Our Beloved Month of August	Aquele Querido Mês de Agosto	Miguel Gomes	Portugal
2010	Alamar		Pedro González-Rubio	Mexico
2011	May they rest in revolt (Figures of wars)	Qu'ils reposent en révolte (Des figures de guerre)	Sylvain George	France
2012	Policeman	Ha-shoter	Nadav Lapid	Israel
2013	Berberian Sound Studio		Peter Strickland	United Kingdom
2014	Fifi Howls from Happiness	Fifi az khoshhali zooze mikeshad	Mitra Farahani	Iran
2015	Court	Tribunal	Chaitanya Tamhane	India
2016	The Long Night of Francisco Sanctis	La Larga Noche de Francisco Sanctis	Francisco Márquez, Andrea Testa	Argentina
2017	Niñato		Adrián Orr	Spain
2018	La Flor		Mariano Llinás	Argentina
2019	The Unicorn		Isabelle Dupuis, Tim Geraghty	United States
2020	Suspended due to COVID-19 pandemic			
2021	Implosion	Implosión	Javier van de Couter	Argentina / Chile
2022	Clementina		Constanza Feldman, Agustín Mendilaharzu	Argentina
2023	The New Greatness Case		Anna Shishova	Finland / Norway / Croatia
2024	The Passion According To G.H.	A Paixão Segundo G.H.	Luiz Fernando Carvalho	Brazil
2024	The Pleasure Is Mine	El placer es mío	Sacha Amaral	Argentina
2025	Under the Flags, the Sun	Bajo las banderas, el sol	Juanjo Pereira	Paraguay / Argentina / United States / France / Germany

=== Full list of winners ===
Year	Winners
2025	Grand Prize (Competencia Internacional): Bajo las banderas, el sol, by Juanjo Pereira (Paraguay/Argentina/US/France/Germany); Best Feature Film (Competencia Internacional): Le Rendez-vous de l’été, by Valentine Cadic (France); Best Short Film (Competencia Internacional): Minha mãe é uma vaca, by Moara Passoni (Brazil); Best Direction (Competencia Internacional): Tomás Alzamora Muñoz, for Denominación de origen (Chile); Special Jury Prize (Competencia Internacional): El día interrumpido, by María Villar (Argentina); Best Acting (Competencia Internacional): María Cavalier-Bazán, for Aimer perdre (Belgium); Grand Prize (Competencia Argentina): La virgen de la tosquera, by Laura Casabé (Argentina/Mexico/Spain); Best Feature Film (Competencia Argentina): Todas las fuerzas, by Luciana Piantanida (Argentina/Peru); Best Short Film (Competencia Argentina): El banner, by Tomás Terzano (Argentina/Spain); Best Direction (Competencia Argentina): Tomás Terzano, for El banner (Argentina/Spain); Special Jury Prize (Competencia Argentina): The Bewilderment of Chile, by Lucía Seles (Argentina); Best Acting (Competencia Argentina): Andrea Carballo & César Troncoso, for La mujer del río (Argentina/Uruguay); Buenos Aires City Prize: LS83, by Herman Szwarcbart (Argentina/Germany); Audience Award for Best Argentine Feature: Presente continuo, by Ulises Rosell (Argentina); Grand Prize (Competencia Vanguardia y Género): BLKNWS: Terms & Conditions, by Khalil Joseph (US/Ghana); Best Feature Film (Vanguardia y Género): Bomba Bernal, by Khavn (Philippines); Best Short Film (Vanguardia y Género): Crash-Huang xi hu xi, by Dale Zhou & Hongxiang Zhou (US); Best Direction (Vanguardia y Género): Marie Losier, for Barking in the Dark (France); Special Jury Prize (Vanguardia y Género): Crónicas del absurdo, by Miguel Coyula (Cuba); Best Acting (Vanguardia y Género): Verónica Intile, for Río, luego existo (Argentina)
2024	Best Film: A paixão segundo G.H., by Luiz Fernando Carvalho (Brazil) & El placer es mío, by Sacha Amaral (Argentina); Best Director: Oksana Karpovych, for Intercepted (Canada); Best Actress: Maria Fernanda Cândido, for A paixão segundo G.H. (Brazil); Special Jury Award: L'Homme d'argile, by Anaïs Tellenne (France); Best Argentinian Film: Vrutos, by Miguel Bou (Argentina); Best Argentinian Director: Miguel Bou, for Vrutos (Argentina); Argentinian Special Mention: La bolsita de agua caliente, by Yuliana Brutti (Argentina)
2023	Best Film: The New Greatness Case, by Anna Shishova (Finland/Croatia/Norway); Best Director: Agustín Carbonere, for El santo (Argentina); Award for Best Acting Ensemble: Dolores Fonzi, Carla Peterson, Rita Cortese, for Blondi (Argentina); Special Jury Award: Muertes y maravillas, by Diego Soto (Chile); Best Argentinian Film: Terminal Young, by Lucía Seles (Argentina); Best Argentinian Director: Martín Shanly, for Arturo a los 30 (Argentina); Argentinian Special Mention: Los Bilbao, by Pedro Speroni (Argentina)
2022	Best Film: Clementina, by Constanza Feldman & Agustín Mendilaharzu (Argentina); Best Director: Neus Ballús, for Sis dies corrents (Spain); Best Actress/Actor: Juan Cano, for Proyecto Fantasma (Chile) & Judith Roddy, for The Cry of Granuaile (Ireland); Special Jury Award: Happer’s Comet, by Tyler Taormina (United States); Best Argentinian Film: La edad media, by Alejo Moguillansky & Luciana Acuña (Argentina); Best Argentinian Director: Máximo Ciambella, for Amancay (Argentina) - Special Jury Award: Camuflaje, by Jonathan Perel (Argentina); Audience Award for National Film: Clementina (Argentina)
2021	Best Film: Cosas que no hacemos, by Bruno Santamaría Razo (Mexico); Best Director: Eduardo Giralt Brun & Emmanuel Massú, for Los plebes (Mexico); Best Actress: Ayla Gresto, for Ainda temos a imensidão da noite (Brazil) & Simone Spoladore, for O livro dos prazeres (Brazil/Argentina); Special Jury Award: Cosas que no hacemos (Mexico); Best Argentinian Film: Spanish: Implosión, by Javier Van de Couter (Argentina/Chile); Best Argentinian Director: Jonathan Perel, for Responsabilidad empresarial (Argentina); Best Latin-American Film: Vacío, by Paul Venegas (Ecuador/Uruguay)
2020	Suspended due to COVID-19 pandemic
2019	Best Film: The Unicorn, by Isabelle Dupuis and Tim Geraghty (United States); Best Director: Louis Garrel, for A Faithful Man (France); Best Actress: Ella Smith for Ray & Liz (United Kingdom); Best Actor: Keita Nimomiya, for We Are Little Zombies (Japan); Best Original Music: Mica Levi, for Monos (Colombia); Special Jury Award: Los tiburones, by Lucía Garibaldi (Uruguay); Best Argentinian Film: Fin de siglo, by Lucio Castro (Argentina); Best Argentinian Director: Eloísa Solaas, for Las facultades Argentinian Special Mention: Brief Story from the Green Planet, by Santiago Loza; Best Latin-American Film: La fundición del tiempo, by Juan Álvarez Neme (Uruguay); Audience Award for Foreign Film: La asfixia, by Ana Isabel Bustamante (Guatemala); Audience Award for National Film: Método Livingston, by Sofía Mora (Argentina)
2018	Best Film: La Flor, by Mariano Llinás (Argentina); Best Director: Tiago Melo, for Azougue Nazaré (Brazil); Best Actress: Pilar Gamboa, Elisa Carricajo, Valeria Correa and Laura Paredes, for La Flor (Argentina); Best Actor: Anders Juul, for A Horrible Woman (Denmark); Special Jury Award: Violence Voyager, by Japanese: Ujicha (Japan); Special Mention: A Tiger in Winter, by Lee Kwang-kuk (South Korea); As boas maneiras, by Juliana Rojas and Marco Dutra (Brazil); Best Argentinian Film: Las hijas del fuego, by Albertina Carri (Argentina); Best Latin-American Film: Spanish: Averno, by Marcos Loayza (Bolivia); Audience Award for Foreign Film: Virus Tropical, by Santiago Ciacedo (Colombia); Audience Award for National Film: Foto Estudio Luisita, by Sol Miraglia and Hugo Manso (Argentina)
2017	Best Film: Niñato, by Adrián Orr (Spain); Best Director: Carla Simón, for Estiu 1993 (Spain); Best Individual Acting: Daniela Castillo, for Reinos (Chile); Best Cast: Hoy partido a las 3, by Clarisa Navas (Argentina); Special Jury Award: Viejo Calavera, by Kiro Russo (Bolivia); Special Mention: Arábia, by Affonso Uchôa and João Dumans (Brazil); Best Argentinian Film: La vendedora de fósforos, by Alejo Moguillansky (Argentina); Best Latin-American Film: A Cidade do Futuro, by Marília Hughes Guerreiro and Cláudio Marques (Brazil); Audience Award for Foreign Film: Estiu 1993, by Carla Simón (Spain); Audience Award for National Film: Las cinéphilas, by María Álvarez (Argentina)
2016	Best Film: La Larga Noche de Francisco Sanctis, by Francisco Márquez and Andrea Testa (Argentina); Best Director: Tamer El Said, for Arabic: Akher ayam el madina (Egypt); Best Actor: Spanish: Diego Velázquez, for La Larga Noche de Francisco Sanctis (Argentina); Best Actress: Liliana Trujillo, for Rosa Chumbe (Peru); Special Jury Award: Spanish: La noche, by Edgardo Castro (Argentina); Special Mention: Rosa Chumbe, by Jonatan Relayze (Peru); Special Mention: Portuguese: John From, by João Nicolau (Portugal); Best Argentinian Film: Primero enero, by Darío Mascambroni (Argentina); Best Latin-American Film: Inmortal, by Homer Etminani (Colombia); Audience Award for Foreign Film: Not awarded Audience Award for National Film: Raídos, by Diego Marcone
2015	Best Film: Court, by Chaitanya Tamhane (India); Best Director: Nadav Lapid, for The Kindergarten Teacher (Israel); Best Actor: Vivek Gomber, for Court (India); Best Actress: Verónica Llinás, for Spanish: La Mujer de los Perros (Argentina); Special Jury Award: Songs from the North, by Soon‑Mi Yoo (US/South Korea/Portugal) & Ela volta na quinta, by André Novais Oliveira (Brazil); Special Mention: French: Une Jeunesse Allemande, by Jean‑Gabriel Périot (France/Switzerland/Germany); Best Argentinian Film: La Princesa de Francia, by Matías Piñeiro (Argentina)
2014	Best Film: Persian: Fifi Howls from Happiness, by Mitra Farahani (US/France); Best Director: Daniel & Diego Vega, for El Mudo (Peru/Mexico/France); Best Actor: Fernando Bacilio, for El Mudo (Peru/Mexico/France); Best Actress: Sophie Desmarais, for Sarah préfère la course (Canada); Special Jury Award: Mauro, by Hernán Rosselli (Argentina); Special Mention: El Futuro (Spain) & Mary Is Happy, Mary Is Happy (Thailand); Best Argentinian Film: El Escarabajo de Oro, by Alejo Moguillansky & Fia-Stina Sandlund (Argentina/Sweden/Denmark); Audience Award for National Film: Mientras estoy cantando, by Julián Montero Ciancio (Argentina)
2013	Best Film: Berberian Sound Studio, by Peter Strickland (UK); Best Director: Matt Porter, for I Used to Be Darker (US); Best Actor: Francesco Carril, for Los Ilusos (Spain); Best Actress: María Villar / Agustina Muñoz / Elisa Carricajo / Romina Paula, for Spanish: Viola (Argentina); Special Jury Award: Leones (Argentina/France/Netherlands); Special Mention: Playback (Switzerland); Best Argentinian Film: Spanish: LaPaz (Argentina); Audience Award for Foreign Film: Anina (Colombia/Uruguay); Audience Award for National Film: Ramón Ayala (Argentina)
2012	Best Film: Policeman, by Nadav Lapid (Israel); Best Director: Nadav Lapid, for Policeman (Israel); Best Actor: Martín Piroyansky, for La araña vampiro (Argentina); Best Actress: Zoé Héran, for Tomboy (France); Special Jury Award: Germania, by Maximiliano Schonfeld (Argentina); Special Mention: La chica del sur, by José Luis García (Argentina); Best Argentinian Film: Papirosen, by Gastón Solnicki (Argentina); Audience Award for Foreign Film: La chica del sur, by José Luis García (Argentina)
2011	Best Film: Qu’ils reposent en révolte (des figures de guerres), by Sylvain George (France); Best Director: Athina Rachel Tsangari, for Attenberg (Greece); Best Actor: Jorge Jelinek, for La vida útil (Uruguay/Spain); Best Actress: Jeanne Balibar, for At Ellen’s Age (Germany); Special Jury Award: El estudiante, by Santiago Mitre (Argentina); Special Mention: Mercado de Futuros (Spain) & Las marimbas del infierno (Guatemala/France/Mexico) & Os Monstros (Brazil); Best Argentinian Film: Yatasto, by Hermes Paralluelo (Argentina)
2010	Best Film: Alamar, by Pedro González‑Rubio (Mexico); Best Director: Corneliu Porumboiu, for Police, Adjective (Romania); Best Actor: Dragoș Bucur, for Police, Adjective (Romania); Best Actress: Pilar Gamboa & María Villar (tie), for Lo que más quiero (Argentina); Special Jury Award: La bocca del lupo, by Pietro Marcello (Italy); Special Mention: (not clearly listed publicly); Best Argentinian Film: Invernadero, by Gonzalo Castro (Argentina)
2009	Best Film: Aquele Querido Mês de Agosto, by Miguel Gomes (Portugal); Best Director: Maren Ade, for Everyone Else (Germany); Best Actor: Alfredo Castro, for Tony Manero (Chile); Best Actress: Maria Dinulescu, for Hooked (Romania); Special Jury Award: Gasolina, by Julio Hernández Cordón (Guatemala); Special Mention: Todos mienten, by Matías Piñeiro (Argentina); Best Argentinian Film: Castro, by Alejo Moguillansky (Argentina)
2008	Best Film: Intimidades de Shakespeare y Víctor Hugo, by Yulene Olaizola (Mexico); Best Director: Lance Hammer, for Ballast (United States); Best Actor: Lee Kang-sheng, for Help Me Eros (Taiwan); Best Actress: Dan Liu, for Night Train (China); Special Jury Award: Night Train (China); Special Mention: Profit Motive and the Whispering Wind, by John Gianvito (United States); Best Argentinian Film: Unidad 25, by Alejo Hoijman (Argentina)
2007	Best Film: In Between Days, by So Yong‑Kim (Canada/USA/Korea); Best Director: Hugo Vieira da Silva, for Body Rice (Portugal); Best Actor: Arturo Goetz, for El asaltante (Argentina); Best Actress: Jiseon Kim, for In Between Days (Canada/USA/Korea); Special Jury Award: Estrellas, by Federico León & Marcos Martínez (Argentina); Best Argentinian Film: UPA! Una película argentina, by Santiago Giralt, Camila Toker & Tamae Garateguy (Argentina)
2006	Best Film: En el hoyo, by Juan Carlos Rulfo (Mexico); Special Jury Award: Sehnsucht, by Valeska Grisebach (Germany); Best Argentinian Film: Glue, by Alexis Dos Santos (Argentina)
2005	Best Film: El cielo gira, by Mercedes Álvarez (Spain); Best Director: Ilya Khrzhanovsky, for 4 (Russia); Best Actor: Mohammad Bakri, for Private (Italy); Best Actress: Eva Löbau, for Der wald vor lauter Bäumen (Germany); Special jury Award: L'Esquive, by Abdellatif Kechiche (France); Special Mention: Frakchi, by Cheol-Mean Wang (South Korea) and Monobloc, by Luis Ortega (Argentina); Best Argentinian Film: Como un avión estrellado, by Ezequiel Acuña (Argentina); Audience Award for Foreign Film: El Cielo Gira by Mercedes Álvarez (Spain); Audience Award for National Film: Cándido López - Los campos de batalla, by José Luis García (Argentina)
2004	Best Film: Parapalos, by Ana Poliak (Argentina); Best Director: Royston Tan, for 15 (Singapore); Best Actor: Pietro Sibille, for Días de Santiago (Peru); Best Actress: Hwang Jeong-min, for Jigureul jikyeora! (South Korea); Special Jury Award: Las horas del día, by Jaime Rosales (Spain); Special Mention: Not awarded Audience Award for Foreign Film: The Story of the Weeping Camel, by Byambasuren Davaa and Luigi Falorni (Germany); Audience Award for National Film: Whisky Romeo Zulu, by Enrique Piñeyro (Argentina)
2003	Best Film: Heremakono, by Abderrahmane Sissako (Mauritania); Best Director: Apichatpong Weerasethakul, for Sud sanaeha (Thailand); Best Actor: Alejandro Ferretis, for Japón (Mexico); Best Actress: Séverine Caneele, for Une part du ciel (France/Belgium/Luxembourg); Special Jury Award: Ana y los otros, by Celina Murga (Argentina); Special Mention: Los rubios, by Albertina Carri (Argentina); Audience Award: Los rubios, by Albertina Carri (Argentina)
2002	Best Film: Tornando a casa, by Vincenzo Marra (Italy); Best Director: Michael Gilio, for Kwik Stop (United States); Best Actor: Lennie Burmeister, for Bungalow (Germany); Best Actress: Ronit Elkabetz, for Hatuna Meuheret (Israel/France); Special Jury Award: Tan de repente, by Diego Lerman (Argentina); Special Mention: Lavoura Arcaica, by Luiz Fernando Carvalho (Brazil); Audience Award: Tan de repente, by Diego Lerman (Argentina) and Lavoura Arcaica, by Luiz Fernando Carvalho (Brazil)
2001	Best Film: Zhantai, by Jia Zhangke (China); Best Director: Nuri Bilge Ceylan, for Mayis sikintisi (Turkey); Best Actor: Daniel Hendler, Jorge Temponi and Alfonso Tort for 25 watts (Uruguay); Best Actress: Yuko Nakamura, for Hotaru (Japan); Special Jury Award: The Mad Songs of Fernanda Hussein, by John Gianvito (United States); Special Mention: Takhté siah, by Samira Makhmalbaf (Iran); Audience Award: Jigsaw Venus by Dean Kapsalis (United States)
2000	Best Film: Ressources humaines, by Laurent Cantet (France); Best Director: Noémie Lvovsky, for La vie ne me fait pas peur (France); Best Script: Sasa Gedeon, for Návrat idiota (Czech Republic); Best Actor: Ewen Bremner, for Julien Donkey-Boy (United States); Best Actress: Anna Geislerová and Tatiana Vilhelmová, for Návrat idiota (Czech Republic); Special Mention: Enrique Piñeyro (For his acting performance), for Esperando al Mesías (Spain/Italy/Argentina); Audience Award: Ressources humaines by Laurent Cantet (France)
1999	Best Film: After Life, by Koreeda Hirokazu (Japan); Best Director: Pablo Trapero, for Mundo Grúa (Argentina); Best Script: After Life, by Koreeda Hirokazu (Japan); Best Actor: Luis Margani, for Mundo Grúa (Argentina); Best Actress: Monic Hendrickx, for De poolse bruid (Netherlands); Audience Award: Sib, by Samira Makhmalbaf (Iran)
