= Laura Citarella =

Argentine film director and producer

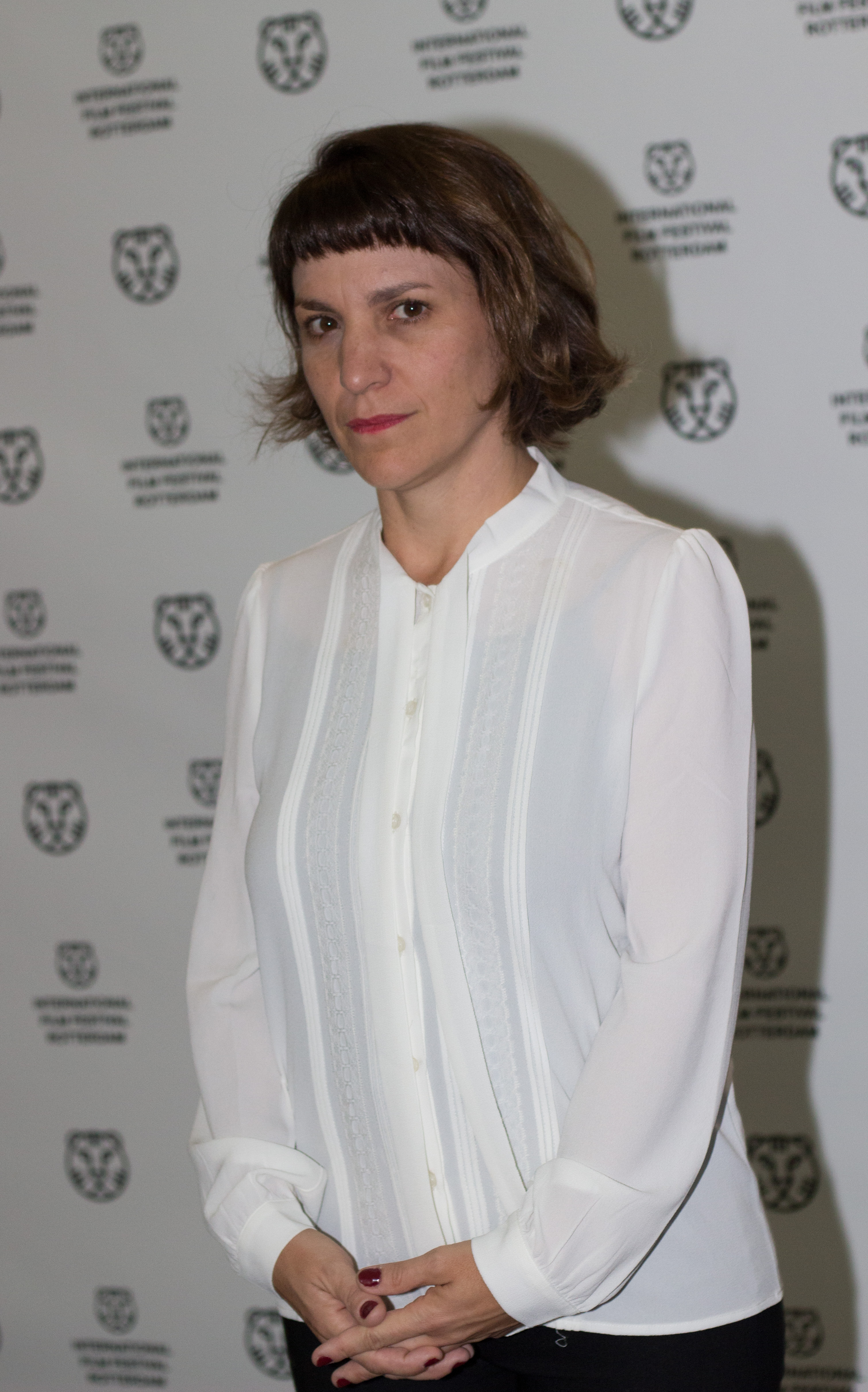
Laura Citarella, 2020

Laura Citarella (born 1981) is an Argentine film director and producer. She has been noted as an emerging voice of the "New Argentine Cinema movement" or el Nuevo Cine Argentino. She is a core producer at the indie production company El Pampero Cine, which she cofounded in 2002, and produced La flor, which at 808 minutes, currently holds the record for the longest running Argentine film in history.

== Early life and education ==
Citarella was born in 1981 in La Plata, Argentina, and grew up Trenque Lauquen, 444 km (276 mi) from Buenos Aires City. Her work is heavily inspired by the summers spent in her hometown. She completed high school at Carlos N. Vergara in La Plata, Argentina and went on to attend the Universidad del Cine, from which she graduated with a degree in film directing in 2004.

== Career ==
=== Teaching ===
Aside from making films, Citarella also teaches at the Universidad Nacional de La Plata (UNLP), where runs a thesis workshop focused on scriptwriting. She has had her films screened at Harvard university, where she gave a lecture about her critically acclaimed film Trenque Lauquen.

=== La mujer de los perros (2015) ===
Citarella and Verónica Llinás co-directed La mujer de los perros (Dog Lady), which garnered attention from international film festivals. Notably, it was an official selection for the Rotterdam Film Festival for 2015 and won Best Actress at the Buenos Aires International Festival of Independent Cinema.

=== Trenque Lauquen (2022) ===
A sequel to Ostende (2011), the film continues the exploration of female subjectivity through the character of Laura, who disappears under ambiguous circumstances in a small Argentine town. The film premiered at the 79th Venice International Film Festival in the Horizons section and later screened at TIFF (Toronto International Film Festival) and New York Film Festival, earning widespread critical acclaim. Notably, it won the Best Latin American Film at the Mar del Plata Film Festival. The film, spanning over four hours and presented in two parts, blends genres—mystery, romance, and political intrigue—while offering an homage to detective fiction and Argentine literary traditions.

== Filmography ==
=== Feature films directed ===
| Year | Title | Notes |
|---|---|---|
| 2009 | Historias breves 5 | |
| 2011 | Ostende | |
| 2015 | La mujer de los perros | |
| 2022 | Trenque Lauquen | |
| TBA | Las Italianas | Pre-production |

=== Short films directed ===
| Year | Title |
|---|---|
| 2002 | Canción para Ana |
| 2008 | Historias breves V: Tres juntos |
| 2013 | Yendo de la cama al living |
| 2023 | Eiko Ishibashi x Laura Citarella |
| 2023 | Trenque Lauquen |
| 2024 | El affaire Miu Miu |

=== Complete filmography ===
| Year | Title | Position |
|---|---|---|
| 1990 | Un elefante en banda | Actress |
| 2001 | La muerte de Ricardo Lee (Short) | Producer |
| 2002 | Canción para Ana (Short Documentary) | Editor, screenwriter |
| 2002 | Yakuza (Short) | Producer |
| 2005 | Love (Part One) | Assistant Director |
| 2005 | Jews in Space | Assistant Director |
| 2005 | Mi primera salida (Short) | Assistant Director |
| 2008 | Historias breves 5: Tres juntos (Short) | Composer, executive producer, screenwriter, |
| 2008 | Historias extraordinarias (Extraordinary Stories) | Actress, Assistant Director, Producer |
| 2009 | Historias breves 5 | Composer, director, executive producer, screenwriter |
| 2009 | Castro | Producer |
| 2010 | El escarabajo de oro | Production Coordinator |
| 2010 | Leisure | Producer |
| 2011 | The Student | Assistant Director, Production Coordinator |
| 2011 | Ostende | Director, screenwriter |
| 2011 | Tres fábulas de Villa Ocampo (Documentary short) | Producer |
| 2013 | The Parrot and the Swan | Executive Producer |
| 2014 | The Goldbug | Producer |
| 2014 | Ocio | Production Coordinator |
| 2015 | La mujer de los perros | Director, executive producer, screenwriter |
| 2018 | Ai Weiwei en Buenos Aires (Documentary short) | Producer |
| 2018 | La flor | Producer |
| 2018 | La flor: segunda parte | Actress, producer |
| 2018 | La flor: tercera parte | Producer |

== Awards and nominations ==
| Film | Awards | Nominations |
|---|---|---|
| Ostende (2011) | Buenos Aires International Festival of Independent Cinema: Asociación de Cronistas Cinematográficos de la Argentina (ACCA) Award | |
| La mujer de los perros (2015) | BAFICI (Buenos Aires) 2015 - International Competition: Best Actress | Athens International Film Festival: Golden Athena for Best Picture; Buenos Aires International Festival of Independent Cinema: Best Film; Hamburg Film Festival: Young Talent Award; Rotterdam International Film Festival: Tiger Award; Rotterdam International Film Festival: Lions Film Award |
