= Extraordinary Stories =

2008 film by Mariano Llinás

- Film poster
- Spanish: Historias extraordinarias
- Directed by: Mariano Llinás
- Release date: 2008
- Running time: 245 minutes
- Country: Argentina
- Budget: $30,000

Extraordinary Stories (Spanish: Historias extraordinarias) is a 2008 Argentine film written and directed by Mariano Llinás. The main cast includes Walter Jakob, Agustín Mendilaharzu, and Llinás himself. The movie has a runtime of 245 minutes and is structured into three acts, each containing 18 chapters, presenting three separate and parallel narratives. These stories follow the lives of three regular men designated as "X," "H," and "Z."

In the first story, "X" witnesses a murder and seeks refuge in a hotel. The second tale centers on "H," who is assigned a perplexing mission. The third narrative revolves around "Z," who becomes deeply engrossed in investigating the life of a recently deceased man he replaces in a new job.

The film was independently produced with financial support from the I.Sat channel, resulting in a budget of $30,000. Distinguishing itself from other Argentine productions, Extraordinary Stories employed a small film crew and often featured actors with minimal or no prior cinema experience. Their roles were flexible and interchangeable.

The movie premiered at BAFICI, where it received two awards, and also gained recognition at the Premios Sur, Cóndor de Plata, and the Miami International Film Festival. It garnered widespread acclaim from both Argentine and international film critics for its unique approach and artistic merit.

== Plot ==
X (Mariano Llinás) arrives in the city of Azul for work and witnesses a violent incident resulting in a man's death. The victim, before dying, hides a briefcase, which X takes. X shoots the victim, feeling uncertain. In his hotel room (Room 301, Grand Hotel Azul), X, fearing the assailants and being involved in the murder, decides to stay hidden. He follows updates on the case through the radio and newspaper, learning the victim was Orlando Rey, a prison guard. One attacker, Salvador Armas, is found dead, and the other, Carlos Armas, is sought by the police. X assumes Carlos is looking for the briefcase.

Z (Walter Jakob) joins an office named "La Federación" and takes over Cuevas' role. His routine job in the agricultural sector includes monthly car trips for on-site inspections. Z stays temporarily in Cuevas' studio apartment, discovering a coded notebook and map in Cuevas' car. The investigation reveals Cuevas had hidden aspects to his life, using names like Krueger.

At the Sol de Mayo Association, friends gather monthly to propose city development projects. Yáñez suggests diverting the Salado River for cargo transport, met with skepticism by Bagnasco. Factorovich challenges Bagnasco, supported by Fava's account of a past abandoned project. They hire H (Agustín Mendilaharzu) to photograph monoliths proving the old project's feasibility. H finds the monoliths destroyed and evidence of recent human presence during his journey.

== Cast ==
- Walter Jakob as Z
- Agustín Mendilaharzu as H
- Mariano Llinás as X
- Klaus Dietze as César
- Horacio Marassi as Saponara
- Eduardo Iaccono as Factorovich
- Lola Arias as Alicia
- Mariana Chaud as María Luisa
- Julio Citarella as Bagnasco
- Edmundo Lavalle as Palomeque
- Leandro Ibarra as Salvador Armas
- Héctor Bordoni as Carlos Armas
- Oscar Mauregui as Orlando Rey
- Fernando Llosa as Cuevas
- Esteban Lamothe as El marido
- Ana Livingston as Lola Gallo
- Héctor Díaz as Salamone
- Daniel Hendler as Narrador
- Juan Minujín as Narrador
- Verónica Llinás as Narradora
