= Affective Moments in the Films of Martel, Carri, and Puenzo =

2018 non-fiction book by Inela Selimović

- Author: Inela Selimović
- Publisher: Palgrave Macmillan
- Publication date: April 2018
- ISBN: 978-1-137-49641-6
- OCLC: 1031090486

Affective Moments in the Films of Martel, Carri, and Puenzo is a non-fiction book by Inela Selimović. Published in 2018 by Palgrave Macmillan, it discusses the work of Argentine filmmakers Lucrecia Martel, Albertina Carri, and Lucía Puenzo.

== General references ==
- Roberts-Camps, Traci (2019). "Review of Affective Moments in the Films of Martel, Carri, and Puenzo, Selimovic, Inela". Journal of Gender and Sexuality Studies / Revista de Estudios de Género y Sexualidades. 45 (2): 152–154. doi:10.14321/jgendsexustud.45.2.0152. ISSN 2637-9961.
- St-Georges, Charles (2020). "Affective Moments in the Films of Martel, Carri, and Puenzo by Inela Selimović". Revista de Estudios Hispánicos. 54 (2): 637–639. doi:10.1353/rvs.2020.0053. ISSN 2164-9308.
