= Mariano Llinás =

Argentine filmmaker

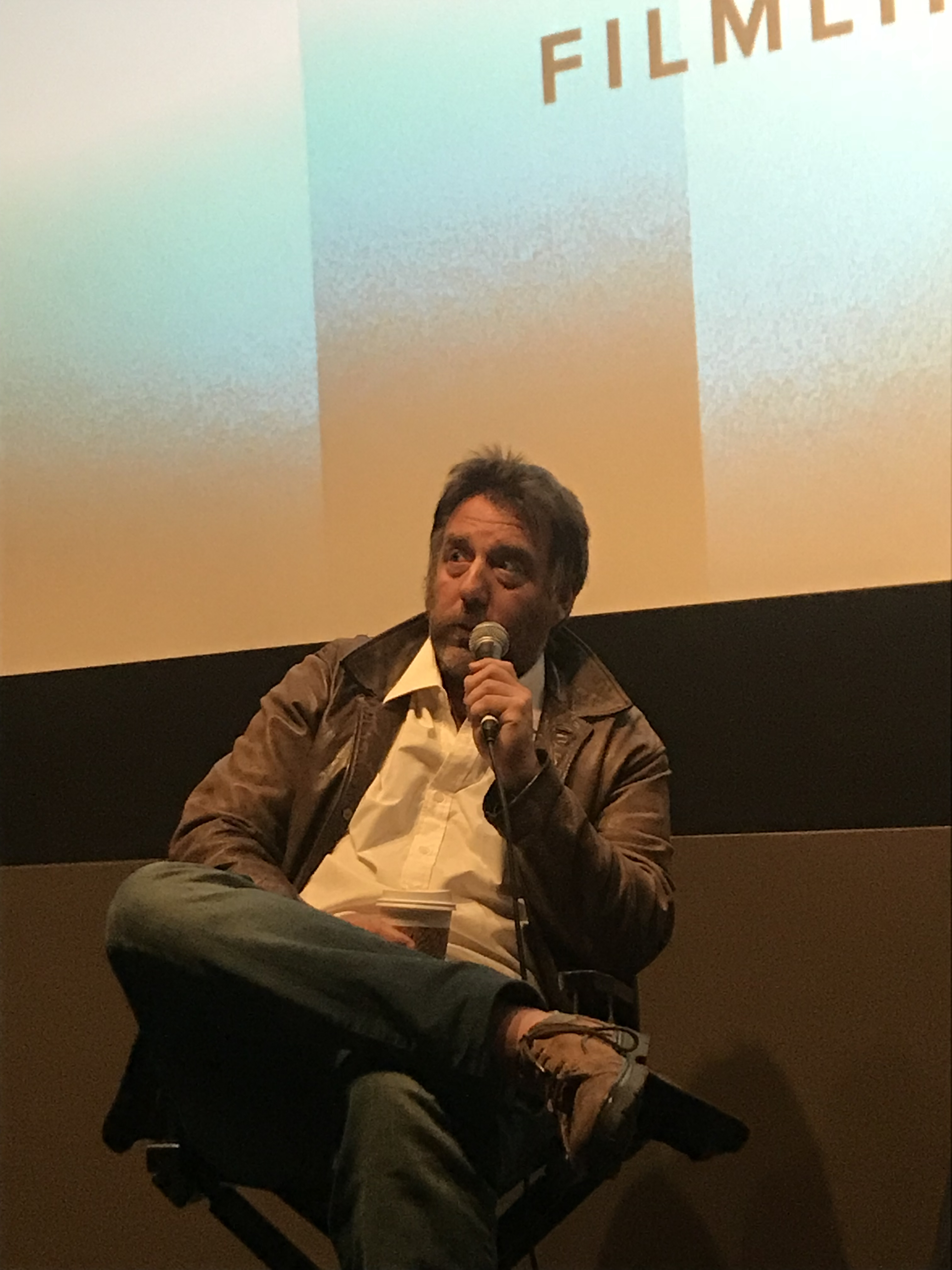
- Mariano Llinás at NYFF 2018
- Born: February 10, 1975 (age 51); Buenos Aires, Argentina
- Education: Fundación Universidad del Cine
- Occupations: Director, screenwriter, teacher
- Years active: 2004-present
- Father: Julio Llinás
- Relatives: Verónica Llinás (sister)

Mariano Llinás is an Argentine film director, producer, screenwriter and actor. Llinás graduated from the Universidad del Cine de Argentina, where he currently works as a teacher. He is the son of writer, art critic, publicist and surrealist poet Julio Llinás and brother of renowned actress Verónica Llinás, who often appears in his films.

== Career ==
Mariano Llinás's feature directorial debut was the 2002 mockumentary Balnearios, which revolves around Argentine balnearios, beachside vacation resorts dedicated to leisure. The mockumentary incorporates some fantasy elements such as mermaids as well as comedic and satirical elements.

Balnearios was followed by the 2008 film Extraordinary Stories, a four-hour tapestry of various interwoven narratives. Mariano Llinás appears in the film as "X", one of the main characters. The film premiered at the Buenos Aires International Festival of Independent Cinema where it won the Audience Award and the Special Jury Prize. The film was well received by Argentine critics, praising its originality, technical ability, and passion.

Llinás' experiments with narrative continued with the 2018 film La flor. At 808 minutes long, La flor is one of the longest narrative films and the longest film made in Argentine cinema history. The film is broken up into six separate episodes - the first four episodes end in medias res, the fifth episode proceeds from start to end, and the last episode is the conclusion of a story.

Llinás co-wrote the screenplay for Argentina, 1985 alongside director Santiago Mitre. The film was nominated for the Academy Award for Best International Film.

== Style ==
Mariano Llinás has been known to incorporate magical realism, postmodernism, maximalism, and hyperlink cinema into his work. He has been praised by outlets such as The Harvard Film Archive for his unique and innovative take on traditional narrative storytelling. Llinás is often grouped into the New Argentine Cinema movement.
