= El amor – primera parte =

El amor - primera parte
- DVD release poster
- Directed by: Alejandro Fadel; Juan Schnitman; Martin Mauregui; Santiago Mitre
- Written by: Alejandro Fadel; Juan Schnitman; Martin Mauregui; Santiago Mitre
- Produced by: Mariano Llinás
- Starring: Leonora Balcarce; Luciano Cáceres
- Narrated by: Sebastián Schor
- Cinematography: Soledad Abot Glenz; Soledad Rodriguez; Laura Caligiuri; Ati Mohadeb
- Edited by: Andrés P. Estrada
- Music by: Gabriel Chwojnik
- Distributed by: Gativideo
- Release date: 12 March 2005 (Cinémas d'Amérique Latine de Toulouse)
- Running time: 110 minutes
- Country: Argentina
- Language: Spanish

El amor – primera parte (English language: Love (Part One)) is a 2004 Argentine independent romantic comedy film directed and written by Alejandro Fadel, Martín Mauregui, Juan Schnitman and Santiago Mitre. The film stars Leonora Balcarce as Sofía and Luciano Cáceres as Pedro, who play lovers who eventually separate after two years. The music for the film was composed by Gabriel Chwojnik.

== Plot ==
The film follows the lives of a young couple who meet on a trip, from the ecstasy of falling in love to the dark end days of their relationship. After two years the couple decide to split and pretend to not see each other.

== Cast ==
- Leonora Balcarce as Sofía
- Luciano Cáceres as Pedro
- Víctor Hugo Carrizo as Encargado de edificio
- Julián Krakov
- Lucila Mangone
- Lourdes Medrano
- Agustín Mendilaharzu
- Luis Alberto Romero
- Sebastián Schor as Narrator

== Release and acclaim ==
The film premiered in Argentina in October 2004 although it was shown in France (Cinémas d'Amérique Latine de Toulouse) on 12 March 2005 and Poland on 19 June.

Worldcinema.org described it as a "fresh, likeable comedy about the beginning, middle and end of a romance, writing that the first part of the film was a "charming piece of froth that should hit the mark with young audiences who will see themselves reflected in the 25-year-olds’ pains", though remarked that "viewers over 30 are likely to find the concept too cute for its own good."

The Dutch Cine Magazine wrote: "El amor (primera parte) is already a special project from a production point of view. It is a collective initiative, in which four different directors, all students of the Fundación Universidad del Cine (FUC), were brought together by producer Mariano Llinás to explore the expressive possibilities of cinema. Voice-over, animation, intertitles, dramatic scenes, and dialogue were used. All this, including the different interpretations of the creators, does not make for a chaotic, disjointed film, but rather for a smooth, varied production, showing at one time an interesting true observation, and then a humorous animation or flashback. In addition, the film's content is also extremely satisfying and it is not noticeable that different directors are involved. "
