= De panzazo =

- Film poster
- Directed by: Gabriel O. Luviano Valenzuela
- Written by: Carlos Loret de Mola, Mario Gutiérrez Vega y la Asociación Mexicanos Primero
- Produced by: Daniela Alatorre
- Cinematography: Felipe Gómez, Juan Carlos Rulfo and Martha Uc
- Music by: Leonardo Heiblum and Jacobo Lieberman
- Distributed by: Gabriel O. Luviano Valenzuela
- Release date: 24 February 2012 (Mexico)
- Running time: 85 minutes
- Country: Mexico
- Language: Spanish

De panzazo (stylized as 'De P6nz6zo; lit. 'belly flop', but figuratively "barely approved") is a Mexican documentary film, led by Juan Carlos Rulfo and co-produced by Carlos Loret de Mola. It was an initiative of the Mexican non-profit educational organization Mexicanos Primero ("Mexicans First"). The project was developed over three years. It premiered in Mexico on 24 February 2012, in Guadalajara, San Luis Potosí, Mérida, Morelia, Puebla, Querétaro and the Federal District.

== Synopsis ==
The movie reflects the current state of education in Mexico. The movie shows parents, principals, teachers, officials, union representatives and opinion leaders to present an overall picture about education in Mexico.

It captures the daily dynamics of schools in Ciudad Juárez, Yucatán, and Morelia, the mountains of Chiapas and Guerrero, and Naucalpan and Iztapalapa in the metropolitan area of Mexico City.

== Controversies ==
The film was criticized for ignoring Elba Esther Gordillo's relationship with Felipe Calderón and Emilio Azcárraga Jean and the Alliance for Quality Education in 2008.
