= Géminis =

- Directed by: Albertina Carri
- Written by: Albertina Carri; Santiago Giralt
- Produced by: Pablo Trapero; Barry Ellsworth
- Cinematography: Guillermo Nieto
- Edited by: Rosario Suárez
- Music by: Edgardo Rudnitzky
- Release date: 2005
- Running time: 85 minutes
- Countries: Argentina; France
- Language: Spanish

Géminis is a 2005 Argentine-French drama film written and directed by Albertina Carri. It is set in a rich family where two adolescent children have started an incestuous relationship.

== Synopsis ==
Meme and her brother Jere are teenagers, still at home under a passive father, Daniel, and a massively domineering mother, Lucía. Ezequiel, the eldest child, arrives from Spain with his bride Montse, who finds both the family and the society of upper-middle-class Argentina hollow and pretentious. Gradually, the other characters learn that Meme and Jere, neither of whom has developed satisfactory outside links, have started an incestuous sexual relationship.

== Cast ==
- Cristina Banegas as Lucía
- Daniel Fanego as Daniel
- María Abadi as Meme
- Lucas Escáriz as Jeremías
- Damián Ramonda as Ezequiel
- Silvia Baylé as Olga
- Julieta Zylberberg as Montse
- Lucrecia Capello as Nené
- Carlos Durañona as Jorge
- Beatriz Spelzini as Inés
- Gogó Andreu as Lucio
- Vivi Tellas as Ana
