= Carlos Loret de Mola =

Political journalist (born 1976)

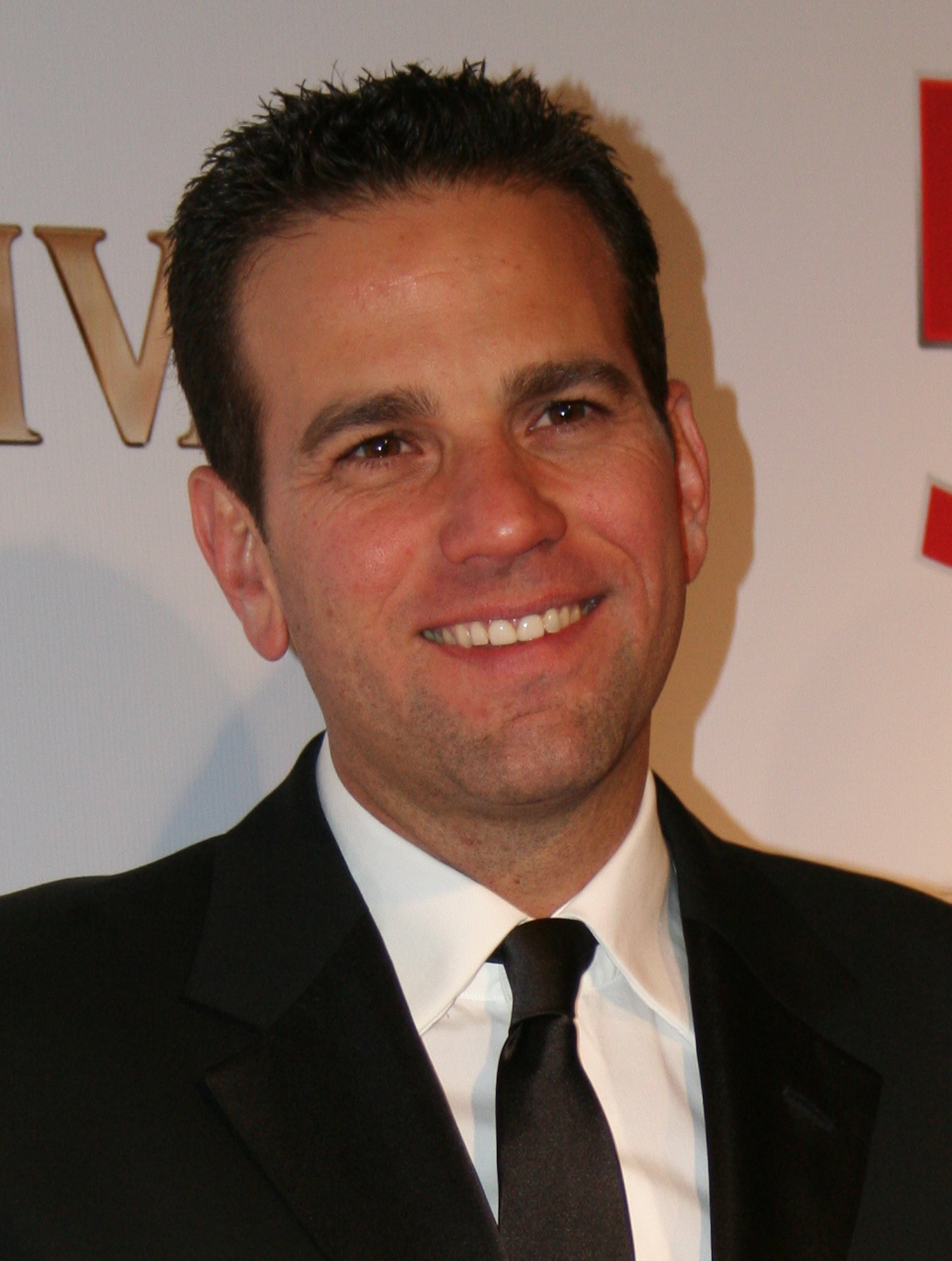
- Loret de Mola in 2012
- Born: 17 October 1976 (age 49); Mérida, Yucatán, Mexico
- Education: Instituto Tecnológico Autónomo de México (ITAM) (BA)
- Occupations: News presenter, journalist, war correspondent
- Spouse: Berenice Yaber (m. 2002)
- Children: 3
- Website: www.carlosloret.com

Carlos Loret de Mola Álvarez (born October 17, 1976 in Mérida, Yucatán) is a Mexican journalist. He hosts the radio program Así las cosas con Carlos Loret de Mola on W Radio and is a contributor to El Universal.

In 2020, he founded the digital platform LatinUS, which conducts journalistic investigations of corruption and organized crime.

== Career ==
Loret de Mola headed the morning news program on Televisa. He is known for his international coverage as a war correspondent in Afghanistan, Haiti, Syria and Libya. He has also covered political events and natural disasters such as the Indian Ocean tsunami, the Libyan Civil War, the Egyptian Revolution of 2011, the Israeli-Palestinian Conflict, the food crisis in the Horn of Africa in 2011, the Dadaab refugee camp in Kenya, the Tunisian Revolution and the death of Hugo Chavez.

His journalistic work in Mexico has been quoted by The New York Times, The Washington Post, CNN and Al Jazeera.

He was a co-director of the documentary film De panzazo, which he also wrote and narrated, which addresses poor education in Mexico.

== Bibliography ==
- El Negocio: La economía de México atrapada por el narcotráfico (2002)
- Coauthor of Bitácora de Guerra (2002)
- Coauthor of Diálogo con Navegante (2004)
- Coauthor of Haití. Isla Pánico (2011)

== Awards ==
- Premio Internacional de Periodismo by Club de Periodistas de México 2013
- Award for Excellence in Journalism by Arizona State Capitol 2008
- Premio Nacional de Periodismo de México 2007
- Premio Nacional de Periodismo de México 2005
- Special mention Premio Nacional de Periodismo 2001
- Premio del Certamen Nacional de Periodismo in 2002, 2003 and 2004
- Premio de la Asociación Nacional de Locutores in 2002 and 2003
- Primer Premio Parliamentario de Periodismo in 1998

== Personal life ==
He is son of the Mexican writer and political journalist, Rafael Loret de Mola, and grandson of Carlos Loret de Mola Mediz, former governor of Yucatan.
