= The Long Night of Francisco Sanctis =

2016 film

- Film poster
- Directed by: Francisco Márquez; Andrea Testa
- Written by: Francisco Márquez; Andrea Testa
- Starring: Rafael Federman
- Release date: 15 April 2016 (BAFICI)
- Running time: 78 minutes
- Country: Argentina
- Language: Spanish

The Long Night of Francisco Sanctis (Spanish: La larga noche de Francisco Sanctis) is a 2016 Argentine drama film directed by Francisco Márquez and Andrea Testa. It was screened in the Un Certain Regard section at the 2016 Cannes Film Festival.

== Cast ==
- Rafael Federman
- Valeria Lois
- Laura Paredes
- Romina Pinto
- Marcelo Subiotto
- Diego Velázquez
- Fiorela Duranda
- Jorge Lorenzo

== Reception ==
On review aggregator website Rotten Tomatoes, the film holds an approval rating of 100% based on 7 reviews.
