= Trenque Lauquen (film) =

- Directed by: Laura Citarella
- Screenplay by: Laura Citarella; Laura Paredes
- Starring: Laura Paredes
- Cinematography: Agustín Mendilaharzu
- Music by: Gabriel Chwojnik
- Production company: El Pampero Cine
- Distributed by: Grandfilm
- Release date: 7 September 2022 (Venice)
- Running time: 260 minutes (two parts)
- Countries: Argentina; Germany
- Language: Spanish

Trenque Lauquen is a 2022 mystery-drama film directed by Laura Citarella, and starring Laura Paredes, who co-wrote the screenplay with Citarella. A sequel to Citarella's Ostende (2011), the film premiered in the Orizzonti section of the 79th edition of the Venice Film Festival. It was theatrically released in two parts.

== Plot ==
A woman disappears and two men go out on the road to look for her: they both love her. While looking for her, they wonder why did she leave, and although each man has their own suspicions about the real reason, they keep their thoughts hidden from each other, all the while never really becoming rivals.

The sudden escape becomes the hidden core of a series of vignettes that the film delicately weaves: the secret of another woman's heart, also lost, many years ago; the secret of the life of a town in the countryside, governed by a supernatural incident that no one seems to perceive; the secret of their region's plains, which never cease to spread and devour everything, like the mysterious shadows that invade the world after the hour of twilight.

== Cast ==
- Laura Paredes as Laura
- Ezequiel Pierri as Ezequiel aka 'Chicho'
- Rafael Spregelburd as Rafa
- Elisa Carricajo as Elisa Esperanza
- Verónica Llinás as Romina
- Juliana Muras as Juliana
- Cecilia Rainero as Normita

== Release ==
The film had its world premiere in the Orizzonti section of the 79th edition of the Venice Film Festival. It was later screened at various festivals including San Sebastián International Film Festival and the New York Film Festival. In the US, it was released in two parts on 21 April 2023.

== Reception ==
=== Critical response ===
On the review aggregator website Rotten Tomatoes, the film holds an approval rating of 95% based on 20 reviews, with an average rating of 8.7/10. Metacritic, which uses a weighted average, assigned the film a score of 91 out of 100, based on 7 critics' reviews, indicating "universal acclaim".

Trenque Lauquen was ranked first on Cahiers du Cinéma's top 10 films of 2023 list.

=== Awards and nominations ===
Awards and nominations for Trenque Lauquen
Award	Date of ceremony	Category	Recipient(s)	Result	Ref.
Venice Film Festival	10 September 2022	Orizzonti Award for Best Film	Laura Citarella	Nominated	
San Sebastián International Film Festival	24 September 2022	Zabaltegi-Tabakalera Prize	Trenque Lauquen	Nominated	
Film Fest Gent	22 October 2022	Grand Prix for Best Film	Trenque Lauquen	Nominated	
Mar del Plata International Film Festival	12 November 2022	Astor Piazzolla Award for Best Feature Length Film – Latin American Competition	Trenque Lauquen	Won	
Mar del Plata International Film Festival	12 November 2022	Alta Definición Argentina Award to the Best Film in the Latin American Competition	Trenque Lauquen	Won	
Mar del Plata International Film Festival	12 November 2022	Eva Landeck Award	Laura Citarella	Won	
International Cinephile Society Awards	12 February 2023	Best Picture	Trenque Lauquen	Won	
International Cinephile Society Awards	12 February 2023	Best Director (Tied with Albert Serra)	Laura Citarella	Won	
International Cinephile Society Awards	12 February 2023	Best Screenplay	Laura Citarella, Laura Paredes	Won	
International Cinephile Society Awards	12 February 2023	Best Ensemble	Cast of Trenque Lauquen	Won	
