= Celina Murga =

Argentinian filmmaker

- Born: 1973 (age 51–52); Paraná, Argentina
- Education: Universidad del Cine – Cinema
- Occupation(s): Film director, screenwriter, producer

Celina Murga (born April 6, 1973) is an Argentinian filmmaker, screenwriter, and producer. Celina's prevalence within the cinematic industry benefited heavily from her second directorial project Ana and the Others (2003), the film was so well received, it even compelled a certain iconic filmmaker into action. After a screening of Murga's film, American film director Martin Scorsese extended an offer to Murga for her to join him on the set of his current motion picture at the time Shutter Island (2010). However, the invitation for a burgeoning filmmaker to become an assistant within his production is not unprecedented, screenwriter Amy Holden Jones was the first to gain this type of access in 1976, on the set of Martin Scorsese's Taxi Driver.

== Career ==
Celina Murga was born in Paraná, Argentina. At the age of 17, she left her hometown for Buenos Aires, and in 1996 obtained a degree in film direction at Universidad del Cine. Currently, she is a part owner of a production company called Tresmilmundos Cine, and is also a certified teacher at Centro de Investigación Cinematográfica. Ana and the Others (2003) was her first feature film, the narrative follows "a woman who after spending many years in Buenos Aires, gets back to her hometown in search of a man loved a long time before", the film earned much critical success among the global masses. Murga's subsequent films over the years continued to gather her attention and praise in the cinematic community, films such as A Week Alone (2007), a short called Pavón (2010), and her documentary debut Escuela Normal (2012). Martin Scorsese was so impressed with her film A Week Alone (2007), that he chose her as his protege in a special mentorship program sponsored by Rolex, the film revolves around a range of privileged youth who are abandoned at home in a rural and isolated community, and as time passes, "their innocence is gradually corrupted as they experiment with rule-breaking, ultimately leading to house break-ins around the neighborhood." Murga's latest film The Third Side of the River (2014), is executive produced by Martin Scorsese, and distributed by Match Factory. The film's story is about a sixteen-year-old boy who is "divided between the urge to follow his own freedom and the expectations that his father projects onto his future." Murga returned to her native home for the shooting of the film, provincial towns of Entre Rios, north of Buenos Aires served part of the films backdrop. During an interview with Variety for the film, Murga spoke about how coming back to Argentina to shoot also attracted governmental support, she says "The Entre Rios government and municipal authorities always gave logistic support", however "larger financial support came from the provincial government." Within the interview, a question is asked of why a high concentration of female directors come from Argentina, and Murga states that it is a result of the 1990s monumental democratization and reformation of cinema's industrial paradigm, she says now "lots of women go to university every year", and that "there is an equal proportion of both sexes" pursuing the medium.

== Filmography ==
- Interior-Noche (short film, 1999) – director, writer
- Una Tarde Feliz (short film, 2002) – director, writer, producer
- Ana and the Others (2003) – director, writer, producer
- A Week Alone (2007) – director, writer
- Pavón (short film, 2010) – director, writer
- Escuela Normal (documentary, 2012) – director, writer, producer
- Venice 70: Future Reloaded (documentary, 2013) – director
- The Third Side of the River (2014) – director, writer, producer

== Awards and nominations ==
=== Ana and the Others ===
- 2004 Bogota Film Festival: Best Film
- 2004 Buenos Aires International Festival of Independent Cinema: Special Jury Prize, Best Film (Nominated)
- 2003 Nantes Three Continents Festival: Golden Montgolfiere (Nominated)
- 2003 Rio de Janeiro International Film Festival: FIPRESCI Prize
- 2003 Thessaloniki Film Festival: Best Director, Golden Alexander (Nominated)
- 2003 Venice Film Festival: 'Cult Network Italia' Prize – Special Mention
- 2003 Viennale: Reader Jury of the "Standard" – Honorable Mention

=== A Week Alone ===
- 2004 Argentinean Film Critics Association Awards: Silver Condor, Best Director (Nominated)
- 2004 Buenos Aires International Festival of Independent Cinema: Special Mention, Best Film (Nominated)
- 2009 Cartagena Film Festival: Golden India Catalina (Nominated)
- 2009 Munich Film Festival: ARRI/OSRAM Award, Arri-Zeiss-Award
- 2008 Nantes Three Continents Festival: Golden Montgolfiere (Nominated)
- 2008 Thessaloniki Film Festival: Best Director, Golden Alexander (Nominated)

=== Escuela Normal ===
- 2012 Berlin International Film Festival: Caligari Film Award – Special Mention

=== The Third Side of the River ===
- 2014 Berlin International Film Festival: Golden Berlin Bear (Nominated)
- 2014 Havana Film Festival: Best Screenplay
