= The Blonds =

- Theatrical release poster
- Directed by: Albertina Carri
- Written by: Albertina Carri; Alan Pauls
- Produced by: Marcelo Cespedes; Barry Ellsworth
- Starring: Analía Couceyro; Albertina Carri
- Cinematography: Catalina Fernández
- Edited by: Alejandra Almirón; Catalina Fernández; Carmen Torres
- Music by: Gonzalo Córdoba; Charly García; Ryuichi Sakamoto
- Distributed by: Primer Plano Film; Women Make Movies
- Release date: April 23, 2003 (Buenos Aires)
- Running time: 89 minutes
- Countries: Argentina; United States
- Language: Spanish

The Blonds (Spanish: Los rubios) is a 2003 Argentine and American documentary/drama film, directed by Albertina Carri, and written by Carri and Alan Pauls.

The award-winning film documents the search of director Albertina Carri as she investigates what happened to her family during Argentina's "Dirty War.", particularly surrounding the disappearance and murder of her parents. Film critics have called the work an autobiographical semidocumentary work.

The drama/documentary was filmed in black-and-white and in color. In addition to appearing on-camera as herself, Carri is played by actress Analía Couceyro.

== Plot ==
The film deals with a child, whose parents were among the tens of thousands of Argentines who were murdered during the military junta's Dirty War, who years later has to contend with the pain barely remembered. The child is director Albertina Carri, who returns with her film crew to the house she lived in the 1970s and interviews the neighbors about her parents and what happened.

The title of the film comes from an elderly woman's insistent (though ultimately incorrect) recollection that Carri's family members all had blond hair. Carri tries to determine the following in the documentary: Who were the Carris? How did they disappear? Were they blond or brunette? Were they heroes, or was it merely an invention of those who remember them?

== Background ==
=== Basis of film ===
The film is based on the real political events that took place in Argentina after Jorge Rafael Videla's reactionary military junta assumed power on March 24, 1976. During the junta's rule, the parliament was suspended, unions, political parties and provincial governments were banned, and in what became known as the Dirty War, between 9,000 and 30,000 people deemed left-wing "subversives" were forcibly disappeared from society.

=== Style ===
The documentary/drama has, what some critics have called, an odd style. For example, director Carri appears on film as herself in some scenes, but also uses an actor to portray her in other scenes. A.O. Scott writes that the film "is not so much a documentary as a fictional film about the making of a documentary, or perhaps a documentary about the making of a fictional film about the making of a documentary."

== Cast ==
- Analía Couceyro as Albertina Carri
- Albertina Carri as herself
- Santiago Giralt as himself
- Jesica Suarez as herself
- Marcelo Zanelli as himself

== Critical reception ==
On the review aggregator website Rotten Tomatoes, 60% of 10 critics' reviews are positive, with an average rating of 6.1/10.

Critic A.O. Scott, writing for The New York Times, believes the odd style of the documentary made its impact less forceful. He wrote, "The film's open-ended, recursive structure is central to Ms. Carri's intellectual agenda, which is to emphasize the deceptive, indeterminate nature of the truth...Too much of the film is in a mood of chin-scratching detachment, and this creates a vacuum in which its powerful, confrontational moments lose their force, the trauma of the past pushed nearly out of reach."

Critic Kevin Jack Hagopian found the film's message to be important, and wrote, "Los rubios is absurd, tragic, and sometimes, hilarious. It seeks not to eulogize the disappeared in solemn, self-important terms, but to make them as alive and real in the cultural sphere as they are in the political arena, a Borgesian lesson in the ultimate fiction: that of ultimate certainty."

== Awards ==
Wins

- Buenos Aires International Festival of Independent Cinema: Audience Award, Albertina Carri; New Cinema Award, Albertina Carri; Special Mention, Albertina Carri; 2003.
- Clarin Entertainment Awards: Clarin Award; Best Documentary, Albertina Carri; 2003.

Nominations

- Buenos Aires International Festival of Independent Cinema: Best Film, Albertina Carri; 2003.
- Gijón International Film Festival: Grand Prix Asturias; Best Feature, Albertina Carri; 2003.
