= Juan Carlos Rulfo =

Mexican film director

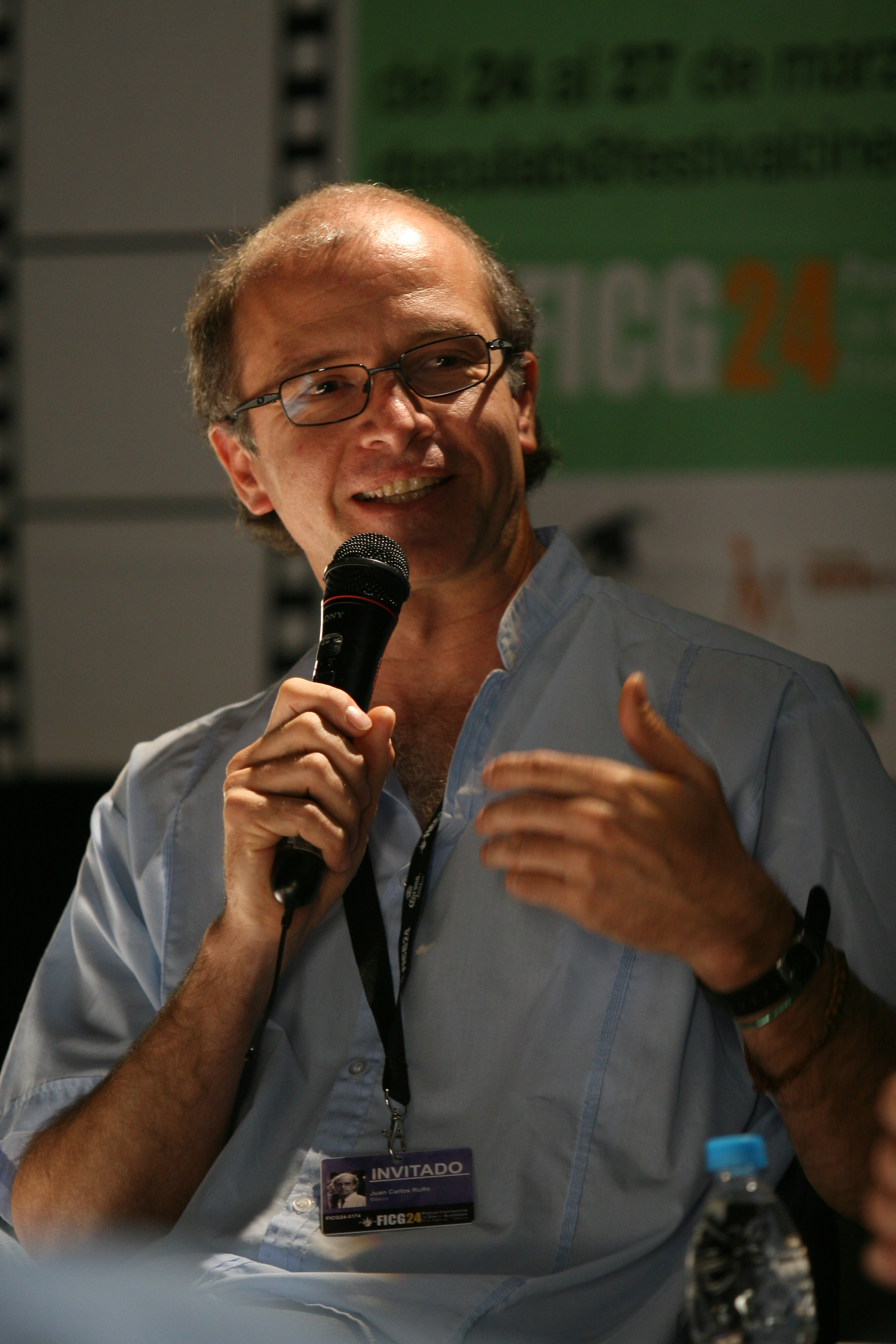
- Born: Juan Carlos Rulfo Aparicio; 1964 (age 61–62); Mexico City, Mexico
- Years active: 1994 – present
- Spouse: Valentina Leduc Navarro

Juan Carlos Rulfo Aparicio (born January 24, 1964, in Mexico City) is a Mexican screenwriter and director and the son of author Juan Rulfo. He has written, produced, and photographed several films.

== Biography ==
Juan Nepomuceno Carlos Pérez Rulfo Aparicio, the son of the Mexican writer Juan Rulfo and Clara Aparicio de Rulfo, studied film at the Autonomous Metropolitan University in Xochimilco and at the Cinematographic Training Center in Mexico City. Due to the heritage his father left him, Juan Carlos has naturally known how to translate cinematographic narrative from rural Mexico to his father's workings of literature.

His first film was his thesis for his graduation from film school, Grandfather Cheno and Other Stories, a documentary that tells the story of his grandfather and fits it in with his father's story Tell Them Not to Kill Me.

Rulfo's movie In The Pit won the Grand Jury Prize for an International Documentary at the Sundance Film Festival. He also won the Ariel Awards for Best Editing and Best First Work for his movie Del Olvido al No me Acuerdo, and was nominated for Best Direction and Best Screenplay Written Directly for the Screen. Rulfo has also won awards at the Goya Awards, the Guadalajara International Film Festival, the Havana Film Festival, the Karlovy Vary International Film Festival, the Montréal World Film Festival.

His 2007 film In The Pit follows the construction crew at work in the construction of the second deck of the Periférico beltway in Mexico City. His 2012 film Carrière, 250 Metres is a biopic of the French screenwriter Jean-Claude Carrière. In 2017, he directed 3 episodes of the TV mini series Cien años con Juan Rulfo which were dedicated to highlight the work of his father. For his 2021 documentary film Letters from a Distance (Cartas a Distancia), Philip Glass composed the music for the film.

== Personal life ==
Juan Carlos Rulfo is married to Valentina Leduc Navarro, a Mexican director.

== Filmography ==
As director
Date	Name	Note
1994	El Abuelo Cheno y Otras Historias	short documentary
1998	Las Despedidas	short documentary
1999	Juan, I Forgot, I Don't Remember (Del Olvido al no me Acuerdo)	Documentary
2000	10 Minutes	Short film
2000	Diminutos del Calvario	
2006	Tiemiehet	Documentary
2006	El Crucero	Short documentary
2006	In The Pit	Documentary
2008	Those Who Remain (Los que se quedan)	Documentary
2009	FINCA Mexico: Stories of Hope	Short documentary
2010	Será por eso	Short TV film
2010	Madero muerto, memoria viva	
2012	Carrière, 250 meters	Documentary, co-director
2012	De panzazo	Documentary
2012	Diario de un Cocinero	TV mini series
2014	Héroes cotidianos: • La Cosecha	TV series documentary, 1 episode
2015	Grandes figuras del arte mexicano: • Juan Rulfo, palabras que saben a vida	TV series documentary, 1 episode
2017	Cien años con Juan Rulfo • Juan Rulfo's Images • Pedro Páramo or writing as a profession • Towards the plain in flames	TV mini series, 3 episodes
2017	The Rock	Short documentary
2018	Once Upon a Time	Documentary
2019	Lorena, Light-footed Woman	Short documentary
2021	Letters from a Distance (Cartas a Distancia)	Documentary
