= Ana and the Others =

2003 film

Ana y los otros
- Directed by: Celina Murga
- Written by: Celina Murga
- Starring: Juan Cruz Díaz la Barba; Natacha Massera
- Edited by: Martín Mainoli
- Release date: 21 April 2003
- Running time: 80 minute
- Country: Argentina
- Language: Spanish

Ana and the Others (Spanish: Ana y los otros) is a 2003 Argentine independent drama film directed and written by Celina Murga.

== Plot ==
Twenty-something Ana, now living in Buenos Aires, returns to her native city of Paraná. She meets old school mates, and old friends, makes new ones, and starts to rethink her life, and perhaps changes her future forever.

== Cast ==
- Juan Cruz Díaz la Barba as Matías
- Natacha Massera as Natalia
- Camila Toker as Ana
- Ignacio Uslenghi as Diego

== Release ==
The film premiered in Argentina on 21 April 2003 and premiered in over 10 major countries worldwide.
