= In the Pit =

In The Pit
- Directed by: Juan Carlos Rulfo
- Written by: Juan Carlos Rulfo
- Produced by: Juan Carlos Rulfo; Eugenia Montiel
- Starring: Sofia García López; Pedro Sánchez Bernal; Agustín Zárate Centeno; Isabel Dolores Hernández; Natividad Sánchez Montes; Isahín Octaviano Simón
- Edited by: Valentina Leduc Navarro
- Music by: Leonardo Heiblum
- Distributed by: Funny Balloons
- Release date: 2006
- Running time: 78 minutes
- Country: Mexico
- Language: Spanish

In the Pit (Spanish: En el hoyo) is a 2006 documentary by Juan Carlos Rulfo. It tells the story of several construction workers in Mexico City involved in the construction of the second story of the Periferico Freeway.

The film won several awards, including the Jury's Prize for Best International Documentary at the Sundance Film Festival.

== Reception ==
On review aggregator website Rotten Tomatoes, the film holds an approval rating of 73% based on 22 reviews, with an average rating of 7.2/10.

== Awards ==
- Karlovy Vary International Film Festival - Best Documentary
- Sundance Film Festival - Best International Documentary, Grand Jury Prize

Awards
Preceded by Shape of the Moon	Sundance Grand Jury Prize: World Cinema Documentary; 2006	Succeeded by Enemies of Happiness
