= Albertina Carri =

Argentinian film director (born 1973)

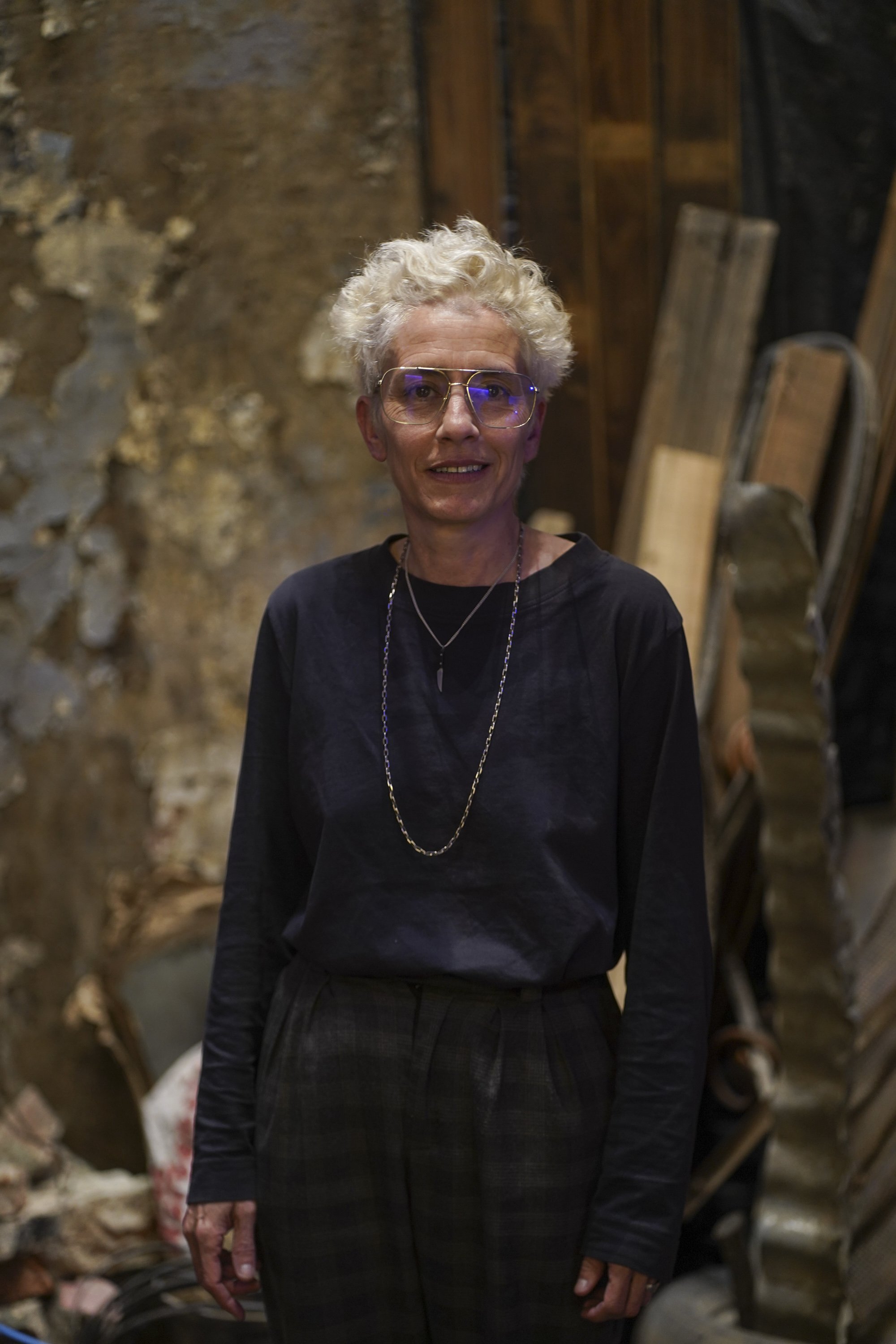
- Carri in 2024
- Born: 1973 (age 52–53); Buenos Aires, Argentina
- Occupations: Filmmaker, writer, audiovisual artist
- Notable work: Los rubios/The Blonds; Cuatreros/Rustlers; Las hijas del fuego/The Daughters of Fire

Albertina Carri (born 1973, Buenos Aires) is an Argentine filmmaker and writer who was part of the New Argentine Cinema movement. Her films have been screened at festivals including Cannes, Berlin, Toronto, Buenos Aires, Locarno, San Sebastian and Rotterdam.

Throughout her career, she has explored noir fiction, documentary, pornography and drama, using techniques ranging from scratching to found footage, animation, documentary observation and erotica.

She was artistic director of Asterisco, Argentina's international LGBTIQ film festival, for its first three editions. Throughout her career she has directed several short films, telefilms, TV series, video installations and seven feature films: No quiero volver a casa, Los rubios, Géminis, La rabia, Cuatreros, Las hijas del fuego and ¡Caigan las rosas blancas!. She has also written the book Los rubios: cartografía de una película, the poetry volume Retratos ciegos (with Juliana Laffitte), the novel Lo que aprendí de las bestias and the epistolary essay Las posesas (with Esther Díaz).

== Personal life ==
Albertina Carri was born in Buenos Aires in 1973, where she currently lives and works. She is the daughter of Ana María Caruso, professor of Literature from the University of Buenos Aires, and Roberto Carri, Argentine sociologist, essayist and founder of the “Cátedras Nacionales”, both of whom were members of the Montoneros organization. On February 24, 1977, when Albertina was 3 years old, her parents were kidnapped and later disappeared by the State terrorism imposed by the last Argentine civil-military dictatorship (1976-1983).

After the kidnapping, and throughout that year, Albertina and her two older sisters exchanged correspondence with their parents in captivity, until they lost contact. In the summer of 1978-1979, the three of them moved to their family’s farm in Veinticinco de Mayo, Province of Buenos Aires. Years later, she was transferred to the care of other relatives in the City of Buenos Aires. At the age of 16, she settled in the household of Alcira Argumedo, who was a comrade of her parents, a member of the Cátedras Nacionales, a prominent sociologist and political figure of Argentine popular nationalism. According to Carri herself, it was Argumedo who encouraged her to start a career in screenwriting at the Fundación Universidad del Cine (FUC) in 1991.

In August 2005, Albertina Carri met journalist and activist Marta Dillon, whom she married and -with the help of their mutual friend, graphic designer Alejandro Ros- had a son, Furio Carri Dillon Ros. He was the first child to be registered in Argentina with a triple filiation to his father, Ros, and two mothers, Carri and Dillon. The marriage with Dillon lasted until 2015.

In 2018 she testified in the trial for crimes against humanity committed in the clandestine detention, torture and extermination center known as “Sheraton”, where her parents had been detained. The defendants were convicted in 2019.

== Career ==
=== Late 90s to 2010 ===
At the age of 17, she began studying screenwriting. For several years she worked as a camera assistant for many relevant directors, including María Luisa Bemberg, Lita Stantic and Martín Rejtman. In 1998 she began working on her first feature film, No quiero volver a casa (I Don't Want To Go Home), which premiered in 2000 and was selected to be screened at festivals in Rotterdam, London and Vienna, among others.

Her foray into animation techniques resulted in the short movies Aurora and Barbie también puede estar triste (Barbie Can Also Be Sad), both released in 2001. The latter, a pornographic fiction, won the Best Foreign Film award in the New York Mix Festival.

Also in 2001 she was invited to be part of the selection of short films that would compose Historias de Argentina en vivo, a project that called on different filmmakers to freely portray a series of concerts organized by the Argentine Secretariat of Culture.

Her second feature film from 2003, Los Rubios (The Blonds), put her amongst the best directors of her age. Los Rubios was released in United States and Spain after being shown in the Locarno, Toronto, Gijón, Rotterdam and Gothenburg film festivals, and received the Audience Award and Best Argentine Film (BAFICI), Best New Director (Las Palmas - Canary Islands) and Best Film (L'alternative - Barcelona). It also received three Clarín Awards: Best Actress, Best Documentary and Best Music. The film is an exploration of the director's memories of her parents, utilizing fragments, fantasies, memories, photographs, and even Playmobil toys to create a narrative that delves into the past while making connections to the present. An actress and a film crew, which occasionally appears on camera, contribute to the intricate construction of the fractured universe in which the protagonist repeatedly encounters the limited boundaries of memory.

Fama (Fame, 2003), her short film starring actress Dolores Fonzi, was part of the series Mujeres en rojo, premiered on Argentine television by the Telefe network.

Géminis, her third feature film, was presented in the Director's Fortnight of Cannes Film Festival and was commercially released worldwide in 2005. The narrative delves into the intricate dynamics of a bourgeois family in Buenos Aires, unveiling conflicts that arise during the eldest son's nuptials and in the sexual relationship between two siblings. This exploration directly confronts the taboo of incest. That same year she directed 0800 no llames, an episode of the miniseries Numeral 15, broadcast by Telefe channel.

In 2007, as part of the 200 años cycle at the Televisión Pública Argentina, Carri was invited by actress Cristina Banegas to co-direct the telefilm Urgente (Urgent), a drama dealing with child sexual abuse, gender violence and abortion. She was also part of the documentary series Fronteras argentinas, produced by the National Institute of Cinema and Audiovisual Arts and the Encuentro channel, with the episode Tracción a sangre (Animal Power). That same year she presented the book Los rubios: cartografía de una película at the Buenos Aires International Film Festival, which recounts the process of pre-production, shooting, post-production and release of the film of the same name. It included a version of the script with annotations by the director, removed scenes, interviews with witnesses, and archive material that formed part of the documentary body of work on which the film was based, including the correspondence -written in captivity- between Ana María Caruso, Roberto Carri and their relatives. The book was reissued in 2023, on the 20th anniversary of the film's release.

Her feature film La rabia (The Rage, 2008), a drama set in the province of Buenos Aires that deals with themes such as sexuality, violence, social dynamics and the relationship with nature in the countryside, has been awarded with two FIPRESCI Awards in Havana and Transylvania, with the distinctions of Best Director in the Havana Film Festival and both Best Director and Best Actress in Monterrey Film Festival.

In 2009 she won the Luna de Valencia Lifetime Achievement Award at the Cinema Jove Festival, held in the homonymous city.

=== 2010 – 2020 ===
She founded the production company Torta in 2010 along with Marta Dillon, with which they produced a series of four documentaries called La bella tarea (The Beautiful Task), about women's rights in childbirth, about the different ways of bringing forth and about the appropriation of this physiological process by the medical corporation. The series aired in 2012.

Also in 2010, she directed the short film Restos (Remains), in the course of a project promoted by the Ministry of Culture of Argentina under the name 25 miradas, 200 minutos, which called on 25 directors to produce 25 short films of 8 minutes each, as part of the activities to commemorate the bicentennial of the Argentine Nation. This is another essay between fiction and documentary that explores memories, imaginaries and militant cinema, censored and destroyed by the last civil-military dictatorship in her country.

During 2011, Carri made Partes de lengua, a video-installation for the Museo del Libro y de la Lengua (Language and Book Museum), as a work that reflects on the mother tongue as a language of conquest and the problems Argentinian territory faces in the light of native languages, oral and written tradition coexisting in a state of tension.

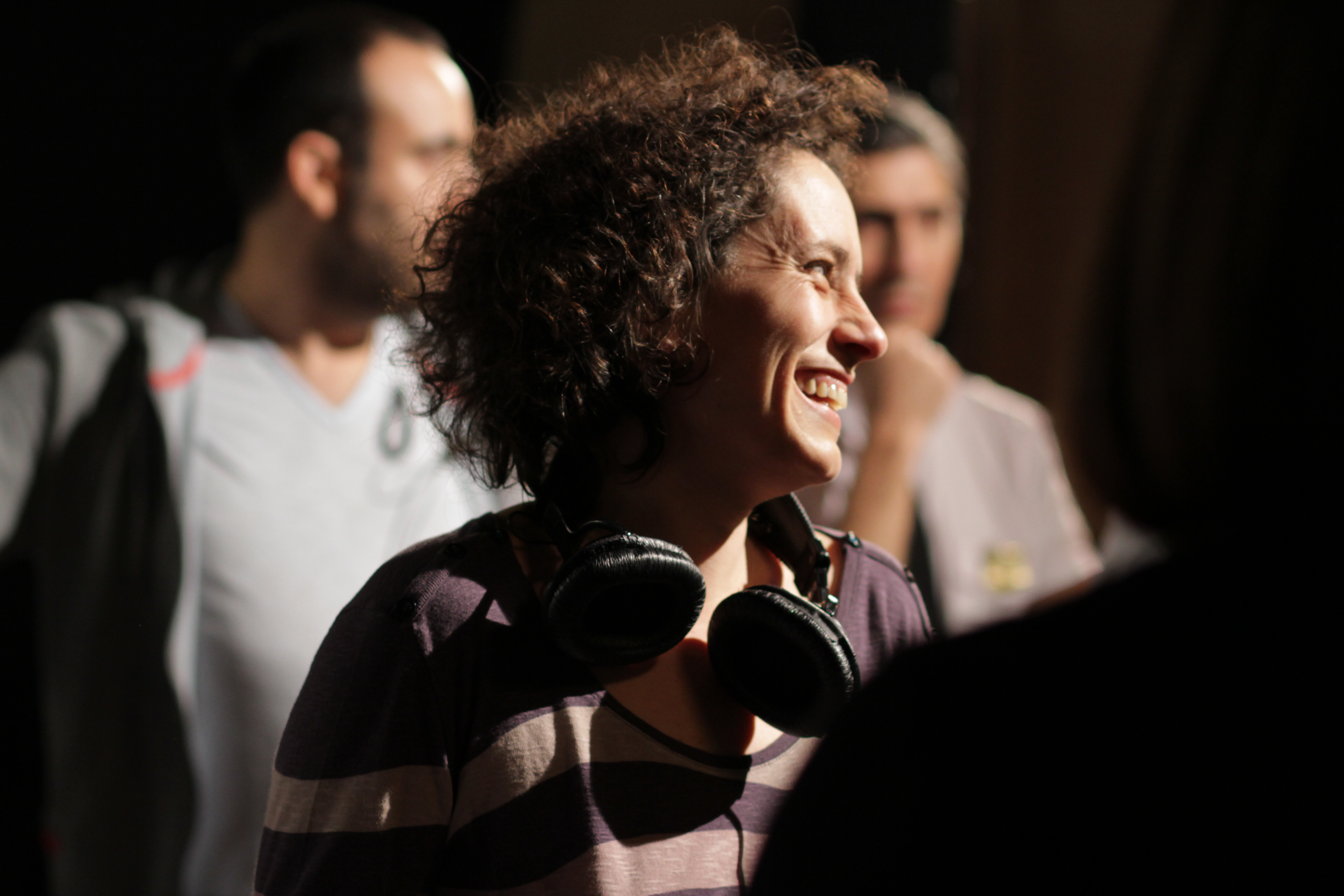
Albertina Carri captured during the shooting of the series called 23 Pairs (2012)

In 2012, Torta produced the program Visibles, televised in Tierra del Fuego and sponsored by the government of that province. The program consisted of six hours in high definition, with various activist guests and short animated clips for each episode, plus an animated glossary and journalistic reports. The same year Carri directed the successful 13-episode miniseries 23 pares (23 Pairs), which aired between September and December 2012, addressing issues such as family, filiation and identity in recent Argentine history through a police plot, starring Érica Rivas and María Onetto.

Between 2014 and 2016 she served as artistic director of Asterisco, the international LGBTIQ film festival, which takes place for a one-week period every year in the City of Buenos Aires.

In 2015, Carri staged the exhibition Operación fracaso y el sonido recobrado in the Parque de la Memoria de Buenos Aires; this exhibition consisted in five video installments with different formats: audible, sculptural and visual, forming an intimate and reflective corpus about the multiple ways of evocating memoria, (Note: In this context, "memory" refers to the memories of the Dirty War, in which people was abducted my paramilitary forces and kept in secret places, often being tortured and killed.) with the intention of making a sensitive experience of the memories of the traumatic events suffered by the victims of the State terrorism.

In 2017, Cuatreros (Rustlers), her fifth film, was released. Defined as an essay film, it is a documentary with fictional elements, elaborated using found footage. It was inspired by the sociological research on rustling carried out by her father, Roberto Carri, entitled Isidro Velázquez. Formas prerrevolucionarias de la violencia (1968) and the lost film Los Velázquez shot by Pablo Szir -a film director who was arrested and disappeared in 1976- and Lita Stantic between 1971 and 1972. Presented at the Mar del Plata Film Festival and premiered at the Berlinale Forum, the movie later received the Sur Award from the Academy of Motion Picture Arts and Sciences of Argentina and the Cóndor de Plata Award from the Association of Film Critics of Argentina, both for best documentary. That year she also presented the video installation about cinema and photography called Animales puros (Pure Animals), at the Performance Biennial BP.17 in Buenos Aires.

The following year, she premiered her feature film Las hijas del fuego (The Daughters of Fire, 2018), a feminist porn road-movie whose protagonists start a journey from “the end of the world” -Ushuaia, Tierra del Fuego, Argentina-, going through erotic and romantic bonds among themselves and with a series of characters that join their adventure, branching out the plot. It was awarded Best Film in the Argentine Competition at the twentieth edition of BAFICI.

=== 2020–present ===
During the preventive and mandatory social isolation decreed in Argentina during the COVID-19 pandemic, she was invited to direct a short film for the Bitácoras series, a production by the Cont.ar platform. In that context, she released 2020: La delgada capa de la tierra during 2021, a documentary essay that explores images and sounds of a post-human Pampean landscape.

In 2021 she first published Retratos ciegos (Blind Portraits), in Mansalva publishing house. The book, also written during the isolation due to the COVID-19 pandemic, comprises dialogues between Carri's poems and drawings by Juliana Laffitte, one of the members of the Mondongo art group, with whom she holds a friendly relationship. That same year, she published her first novel, Lo que aprendí de las bestias (What I Have Learnt From the Beasts), which was later released in Chile in 2023 and Colombia in 2024.

In 2022 she held the exhibition Cine Puro (Pure Cinema) in Berlin. The show, held at the gallery of the German Academic Exchange Service (DAAD), was organized by DAAD with the collaboration of the Ministry of Foreign Affairs of Argentina, the Embassy of Argentina in Germany and the Goethe Institut. Critics Jens Andermann and Roger Koza contributed texts for the exhibition brochure. In this regard, DAAD director Silvia Fehrmann wrote: “Carri stages the materiality of cinema, transforming 7,000 meters of celluloid, projectors discarded for the sake of a supposed progress, short films, sound works and autobiographical documents into an experimental narrative device”.

The same year she published Las posesas (The Possessed), a book of epistolary essays co-authored with Argentine philosopher Esther Díaz.

In 2023, Carri released Palabras ajenas (The Words of Others), a medium-length film produced between 2021 and 2022, which pays homage to the homonymous work by Argentine artist León Ferrari -a literary collage made between 1965 and 1967 in the context of the Vietnam War- with a montage of audiovisual footage recorded during the COVID-19 pandemic.

That same year, the short film Luis Camnitzer: Arte, estado y no he estado (2023) was released as part of the 270 series produced by the Institute for Studies on Latin American Art (ISLAA) in New York. In this short film, the director follows Uruguayan artist Luis Camnitzer through his home as he contemplates the relationship between art, education and the future.

In 2024 she received the Audiovisual Career Achievement Award from Argentine Film Directors.

In 2025 she will premiere ¡Caigan las rosas blancas! (White Roses, Fall!), a feature film, at the Big Screen Competition of the International Film Festival Rotterdam.

== Filmography ==
=== Feature films ===
Year	Title	Credits
2000	No quiero volver a casa	Direction, screenwriting, production, camera operation
2003	Los rubios	Direction, screenwriting, production, camera operation
2005	Géminis	Direction, screenwriting, production
2008	La rabia	Direction, screenwriting, production
2017	Cuatreros	Direction, screenwriting, production
2018	Las hijas del fuego	Direction, screenwriting
2025	¡Caigan las rosas blancas!	Direction, screenwriting

=== Short and medium-length films ===
Year	Title	Credits
2001	Aurora	Direction, editing
2001	Barbie también puede eStar triste	Direction, screenwriting, production
2001	Historias de Argentina en vivo	Direction, screenwriting
2004	De vuelta	Direction
2010	Restos	Direction, screenwriting, production
2021	2020: La delgada capa de la tierra	Direction
2023	Palabras ajenas	Direction, screenwriting
2023	Luis Camnitzer: Arte, estado y no he estado	Direction

=== Television series and telefilms ===
Year	Title	Credits
2003	Fama (episode from Mujeres en rojo)	Direction, screenwriting, production
2005	0800 no llames (episode from Numeral 15)	Direction
2007	Urgente (telefilm)	Direction, screenwriting
2007	Tracción a sangre (episode from Fronteras)	Direction
2011	Visibles (series)	Direction, screenwriting, production
2012	23 pares (series)	Original concept, direction, production
2014	La bella tarea (series)	Direction, screenwriting

== Published writings ==
=== Books ===
- 2007: Los Rubios: cartografía de una película. Reissued at 2024.
- 2021: Retratos Ciegos (Poetry). Co-authored with Juliana Laffitte.
- 2021: Lo que aprendí de las bestias (Novel).
- 2022: Las posesas (Essay). Co-authored with Esther Díaz.

=== Articles ===
- 2013: “Cuestión de imagen”, in Revue Cinémas d'Amérique latine, yearbook of the Association Rencontres Cinémas D'amérique Latine de Toulouse (ARCALT), number 21: Cinéma et politique.
- 2015: "Investigación del cuatrerismo", in Roberto Carri: Obras completas.
- 2016: “El sonido recobrado”, in Bernhard Chappuzeau and Christian von Tschilschke (eds): Cine argentino contemporáneo: visiones y discursos.
- 2019: “Finland Albertina!” in Senses of Cinema #98.
- 2023: “¡Abundancia de zombies y precarización de las imágenes!” in Fundido a negro. Cine y censura a 40 años del retorno de la democracia.
- 2024: “Cámara Ernemann”, in 50x50. 50 objetos/50 miradas.

== Honors and influence ==
Carri's cinematographic work has been studied in academic and artistic areas in different countries, considering both her narrative and aesthetic experimentations, as well as the disruptive content of her thematic figures.
