= John Gianvito =

American filmmaker

- Education: California Institute of the Arts (BFA); Massachusetts Institute of Technology (MS)
- Occupations: Film director; producer; screenwriter
- Years active: 1986–present

John Gianvito is an American filmmaker, film curator, academic and movie critic.

== Background ==
Gianvito attended the California Institute of the Arts where he earned a BFA, and the Massachusetts Institute of Technology, where he earned a MS.

He has worked as a curator with the Harvard Film Archive, and is currently an associate professor with the Department of Visual and Media Arts at Emerson College.

In December 2023, alongside 50 other filmmakers, Gianvito signed an open letter published in Libération demanding a ceasefire and an end to the killing of civilians amid the 2023 Israeli invasion of the Gaza Strip, and for a humanitarian corridor into Gaza to be established for humanitarian aid, and the release of hostages.

== Filmography ==
A partial list of the films by John Gianvito:

- The Direct Approach (1978, short film)
- The Flower of Pain (1983)
- Address Unknown (1985, co-directed)
- What Nobody Saw (1990, short)
- The Mad Songs of Fernanda Hussein (2001)
- Puncture Wounds [September 11] (2002, short film)
- Profit Motive and the Whispering Wind (2007, short documentary)
- Vapor Trail (Clark) (2010)
- Far From Afghanistan (2012, co-directed, documentary)
- Wake (Subic) (2015, documentary)
- Her Socialist Smile (2020, documentary)

== Published works ==
- Gianvito, John (2006). Andrei Tarkovsky. University Press of Mississippi. p. 3. ISBN 1-57806-220-9.
