= La flor =

2018 Argentine film by Mariano Llinás

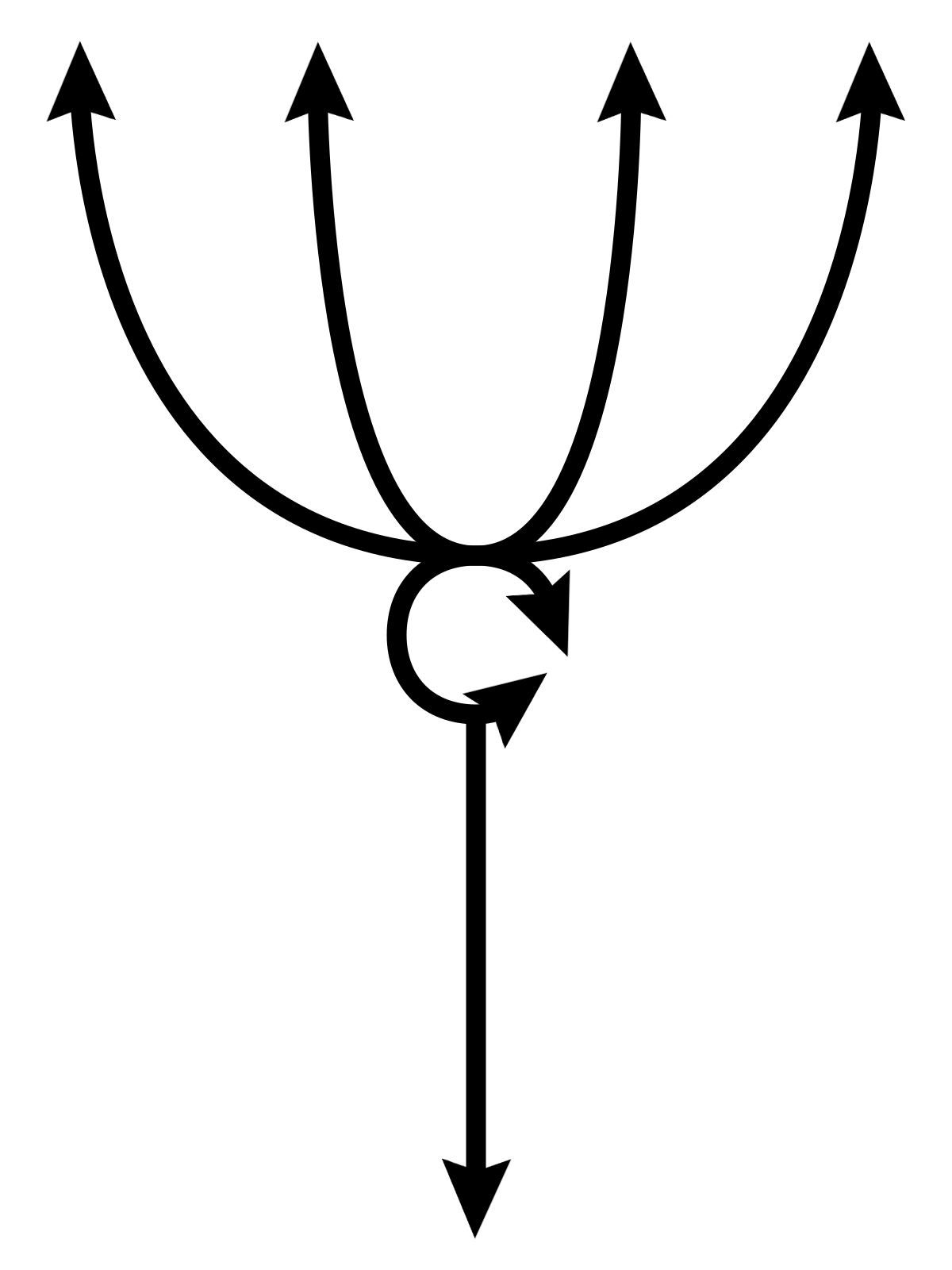
- This flower-shaped graphic was created to depict the relation between the six episodes, most of which start or end in medias res.
- Directed by: Mariano Llinás
- Written by: Mariano Llinás
- Produced by: Laura Citarella
- Starring: Elisa Carricajo; Valeria Correa; Pilar Gamboa; Laura Paredes
- Cinematography: Agustín Mendilaharzu
- Music by: Gabriel Chwojnik
- Production company: El Pampero Cine
- Release date: April 14, 2018 (BAFICI)
- Running time: 808 minutes
- Country: Argentina
- Languages: Spanish; Catalan; Quechua; French; English; German; Swedish; Russian; Italian

La flor (English: The Flower) is a 2018 Argentine anthology film written and directed by Mariano Llinás. With a length of 13 1/2 hours excluding intermissions, it is the longest film in the history of Argentine cinema and the third-longest non-experimental film. The film is a joint project by the production group El Pampero Cine and the acting company Piel de Lava, made up of actresses Elisa Carricajo, Valeria Correa, Pilar Gamboa, and Laura Paredes. It premiered at the Buenos Aires International Festival of Independent Cinema.

== Plot ==
La flor is broken into six separate episodes, connected only by an on-screen appearance by Llinás explaining the film's structure. The first four episodes have the beginning of a story but finish in medias res (Classical Latin: "in the middle of things"). The fifth episode is the only one to proceed from start to end, and the last episode is only the conclusion of a story.

The first episode is shot as a B movie, where a group of researchers encounter a mummy and its supernatural curse. The second episode has two parallel plots. One follows a couple that has broken up as they reunite to record a song together, and the other is a mystery about a secret society formulating a potion for eternal life using a supposedly extinct scorpion. The third episode is about a group of spies, with extended flash-backs describing each of their histories.

The fourth episode uses an experimental metanarrative in which the four lead actresses play actresses who turn against their director and his elaborate narrative structure. After the director disappears, an investigator develops a theory about the actresses after reading Arthur Machen's translation of Casanova's memoirs. The fifth episode is a black-and-white, largely silent remake of Jean Renoir's Partie de campagne. The sixth episode is told through the diary of an English woman living in the Americas during the nineteenth century. She and three other women leave the desert after being held captive for many years.

== Release ==
In the United States and Canada, La flor was released on November 1, 2019, alongside Harriet, Terminator: Dark Fate and Motherless Brooklyn.

== See also ==
- List of longest films
