= The Mad Songs of Fernanda Hussein =

2001 film by John Gianvito

- Directed by: John Gianvito
- Written by: John Gianvito
- Produced by: John Gianvito
- Starring: Bonnie Chavez; Sherri Goen; Thia Gonzalez
- Cinematography: Ulli Bonnekamp
- Music by: Johannes Ammon; Jakov Jakoulov; Igor Tkachenko
- Release dates: October 2001 (Chicago International Film Festival); May 31, 2002 (United States)
- Running time: 168 minutes
- Country: United States
- Language: English

The Mad Songs of Fernanda Hussein is a 2001 American film written and directed by John Gianvito. In Greece, where it won an award, the film is known as Τα Τραγούδια Τρέλας της Φερνάντα Χουσεΐν ("Ta tragoudia trelas tis Fernanda Hussein").

== Cast ==
- Bonnie Chavez - Police Dispatcher
- Sherri Goen
- Thia Gonzalez
- Cliff Gravel - The Veteran
- Carlos Moreno Jr. - Mike
- Robert Perrea
- Elizabeth Pilar
- Dustin Scott
- Carlos Stevens
- Bill Facker

== Awards ==
At the 2001 Buenos Aires International Festival of Independent Cinema, John Giavito won a Special Award for his work on the film. The film was also nominated for Best Film. At the 2001 Thessaloniki Film Festival, the film was nominated for a Golden Alexander.

== Reception ==
The film has a critic rating of 40% on Rotten Tomatoes.
