= Verónica Llinás =

Argentine actress

- Born: September 23, 1960 (age 64); Buenos Aires, Argentina
- Occupation: Actress
- Years active: 1982–present
- Parent(s): Julio Llinás and Martha Peluffo
- Relatives: Sebastián Llinás (brother); Mariano Llinás (brother)

Verónica Llinás (born 23 September 1960) is an Argentine film, television and theatre actress. She is the daughter of the writer Julio Llinás and the painter Martha Peluffo and sister of Sebastián Llinás and the film director Mariano Llinás.

== Career ==
She trained with Agustín Alezzo, Ángel Elizondo and Miguel Guerberoff. She was a member of the mythical theater group Gambas al Ajillo, which from 1986 to 1990, presented different shows at the Parakultural Center, the Empire Theater and the Cement nightclub.

In June 2025, she returned to the circuit starring in Una navidad de mierda" (A Shitty Christmas) at the Teatro Premier, Buenos Aires, alongside Alejo García Pintos, Anita Gutiérrez, and Tomás Fonzi.

== Partial filmography ==
- Deathstalker (1983)
- The Plague (1992)
- I Don't Want to Talk About It (1993)
- Rapado (1996)
- Todas las azafatas van al cielo (2002)
- Glue (2006)
- Pájaros volando (2010)
- Viudas e hijos del Rock & Roll (TV, 2014-2015)
- La mujer de los perros (2015, also co-writer and co-director)
- Psiconautas (TV, 2016)
- Educando a Nina (TV, 2016)
- La flor (2018)
- Trenque Lauquen (2022)
