= Santiago Mitre =

Argentine film director

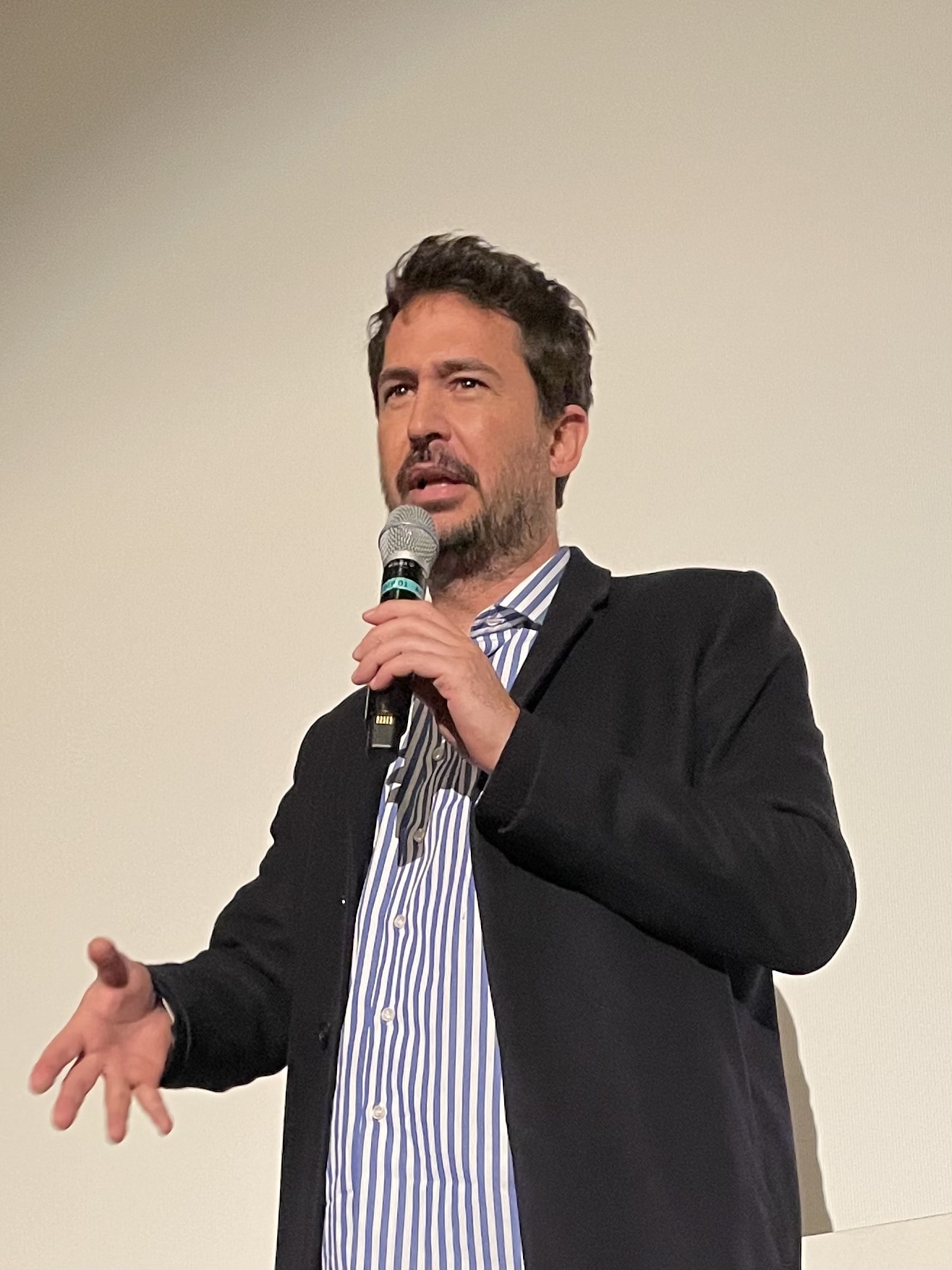
- Santiago Mitre at Zurich Film Festival 2022
- Born: 4 December 1980 (age 45); Buenos Aires, Argentina
- Occupations: Director, screenwriter
- Years active: 2002–present

Santiago Mitre (Spanish pronunciation: [sanˈtja.ɣo ˈmi.t̪ɾe], MEE-tray; born 4 December 1980) is an Argentine film director and screenwriter. He was named as a member of the jury of the Critics' Week section of the 2016 Cannes Film Festival. In 2016, Mitre won the Havana Star Prize for Best Director for his film Paulina at the 17th Havana Film Festival New York.

== Selected filmography ==
- El Amor – primera parte (2004)
- The Student (2011)
- La patota (2015, known as Paulina in Spain)
- The Summit (2017)
- Argentina, 1985 (2022); director, co-producer, co-writer

== Honours ==
In 2025, Mitre was appointed jury president of the Progressive Cinema, Freestyle and Grand Public Competition sections at the 20th Rome Film Festival.
