= Fundación Universidad del Cine =

Private university in Argentina

Coordinates: 34.6179°S 58.3706°W

Universidad del Cine
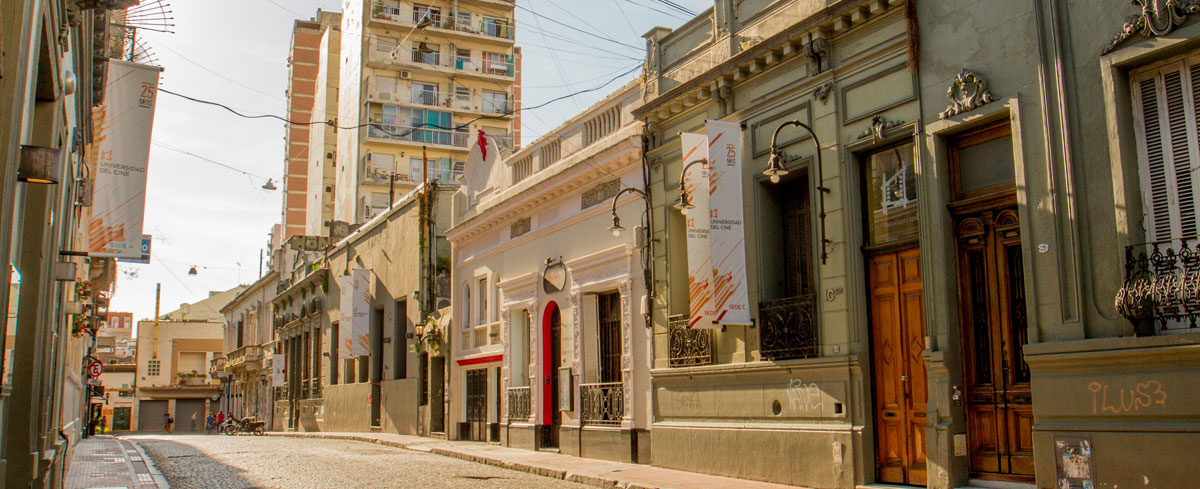
- Other name: FUC
- Type: Private
- Established: 1991
- Founder: Manuel Antin
- Rector: Manuel Antín
- Location: Dr. José Modesto Giuffra 330, Buenos Aires, Argentina
- Language: Spanish
- Colors: Orange black

Universidad del Cine (FUC; English: "University of Cinema/Film") is a private not-for-profit university located in the neighbourhood of San Telmo in Buenos Aires, Argentina. It was founded in 1991 by Manuel Antin,. The school offers undergraduate, graduate and post graduate programmes focused in film and media arts.

== About the Universidad del Cine ==
Since its creation, Universidad del Cine proposed to itself three ambitious goals: to generate a space of creation which could make easier the appearance and realization of new projects; to give hierarchy to cinematographic education, inserting it in the framework of an integral and humanistic education; and become into a production center to deepen its educational action and make possible the insertion of its students in the professional field. Established in San Telmo, the historical quarter of Buenos Aires, we spread, from our beginning, a constant activity that gave urge to the Argentinean cinema.

== Schools and studies ==
=== School of Cinematography (Facultad de Cinematografía) ===
- Degree programs:
- Directing (Dirección de Cinematografía)
- Screenwriting (Guión Cinematográfico)
- Lighting and Camera (Iluminación y Cámara Cinematográficas)
- Scenography and Costume (Escenografía y Vestuario Cinematográficos)
- Film Editing (Compaginación Cinematográfica)
- Producing (Producción Cinematográfica)
- History, Theory and Film Criticism (Historia, Teoría y Crítica Cinematográficas)
- Animation and Multimedia (Cine de Animación y Multimedia)
- Post Degree programs:
- Master in documentary filmmaking (Maestría encine documental)

=== School of Communication (Facultad de Comunicación) ===
- Degree programs:
- Visual Arts (Artes Visuales)
- Graphic Design (Diseño Gráfico)
- Educational Processes (Procesos Educativos)

== Film Production ==
Each year the Universidad del Cine produces more than 150 short films, documentaries and web series. From 1996 to 2008 produced six feature films directed by students:

- Moebius (1996)
- Bad Times (1998)
- Just for Today 2000)
- Mercano the Marcian (2002)
- Vespers (2006)
- Gost of Buenos Aires (2008)

After 2008 the Universidad del Cine gives support to students for the production of theirs own features films.

== Infrastructure and resources ==
The Universidad del Cine is equipped for the production and post production of image and sound in professional video formats, S16mm and 35mm film. It stands out the Laboratory for the process of 16mm. color negative film. This is the only 16mm. non-profit laboratory in Latin America. Its work is oriented to academic and experimental productions. The Universidad del Cine has two filming sets, traditional and digital animation workshops and an auditorium and screening room. Its Library and Video Library is specialized in audiovisual arts, focusing on Argentine cinema. It has about 12,000 bibliographic items and 7,000 video titles.
