= Martina Gusmán =

Argentine actress

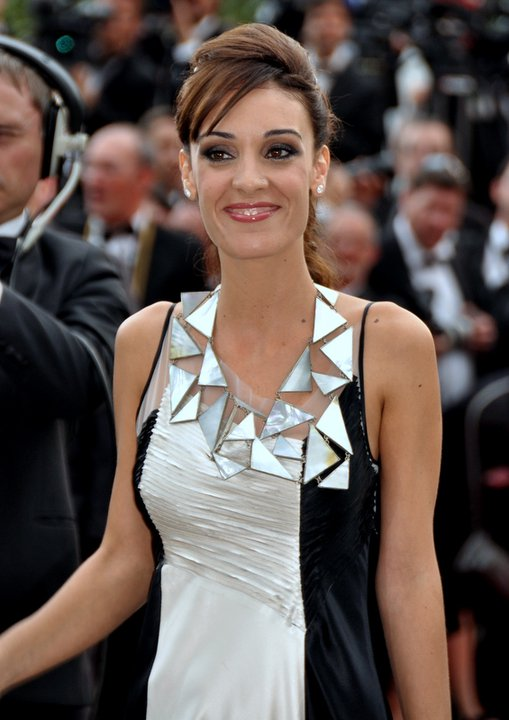
- Martina Gusmán at Cannes (2011)
- Born: 28 October 1978 (age 47); Buenos Aires, Argentina
- Occupations: Actress; Film producer
- Years active: 2002-present

Martina Gusmán (born 28 October 1978) is an Argentine actress and film producer.

== Biography ==
Martina Gusmán has produced around ten Argentine films, including El Bonaerense (2002) and the comedy Familia rodante (2004). She also played under the direction of her partner Pablo Trapero in the film Nacido y criado and in Leonera.; the latter film won her several prizes, including the best young actress award from the Argentine Academy of Cinematography Arts and Sciences.

She starred in the 2010 drama Carancho, which was entered into the Un Certain Regard section at the 2010 Cannes Film Festival. In 2011, she was a member of the jury chaired by Robert De Niro for the main competition at the 2011 Cannes Film Festival.

== Selected filmography ==
- The Lighthouse (1998)
- Nada x perder (2001)
- Lion's Den (2008)
- Carancho (2010)
- White Elephant (2012)
- Sólo para dos (2012)
- The Die is Cast (2015)
- El Hijo (The Son) (2019)
- El año de la furia (2020)
- The Innocent (2021)
- Echo 3 (2022)
- Get Away If You Can (2022)
