= Frequency (TV series) =

2016 American science fiction drama television series

- Genre: Drama; Mystery; Science fiction
- Based on: Frequency by Toby Emmerich
- Developed by: Jeremy Carver
- Starring: Peyton List; Riley Smith; Devin Kelley; Mekhi Phifer; Anthony Ruivivar; Lenny Jacobson; Daniel Bonjour
- Composer: Toby Chu
- Country of origin: United States
- Original language: English
- No. of seasons: 1
- No. of episodes: 13

Production
- Executive producers: Brad Anderson; Jeremy Carver; Toby Emmerich; Jennifer Gwartz; Dan Lin; John Rickard
- Producers: Tim Scanlan; Jae Marchant
- Production location: Vancouver, British Columbia
- Cinematography: Michael Blundoll
- Running time: 42 minutes
- Production companies: Jeremy Carver Productions; Lin Pictures; New Line Cinema; Warner Bros. Television

Original release
- Network: The CW
- Release: October 5, 2016 – January 25, 2017

Frequency is an American mystery science fiction drama television series that aired on the CW from October 5, 2016, to January 25, 2017. Inspired by the 2000 film Frequency, the television series was developed by Jeremy Carver. The series was canceled on May 8, 2017; five days later, an epilogue to the series was released.

== Premise ==
In 2016, New York City Police Department (NYPD) Detective Raimy Sullivan discovers that she is able to speak to her deceased father Frank Sullivan in 1996 via his old ham radio. Her attempts to save his life trigger the "butterfly effect", changing the present in unforeseen ways. To fix the damage, she must work with her father across time to solve a decades-old murder case.

== Cast and characters ==
=== Main ===
- Peyton List as Raimy Elizabeth Sullivan. An NYPD detective, Raimy experiences an unusual weather phenomenon that allows her to communicate with her late father through radio transmissions. Born and raised in Queens, Raimy is stationed at the 21st Precinct (the same precinct at which her father worked in 1996) and has been since the start of her career in 2008. She achieved the rank of detective in 2014. After changing the timeline by conversing with her father, Raimy seems to be the only one who notices the changes. Now, she and Frank work across time to solve the Nightingale murders before her mother can become the killer's next victim.
  - Ada Breker as young Raimy
- Riley Smith as Frank Sullivan, Raimy's father and an NYPD detective in 1996. He was originally killed while working undercover and posthumously accused of being corrupt, but survived when Raimy changed the timeline by warning him of his impending death. In the new timeline caused by his survival in 1996, Frank saw his daughter grow up and graduate from the police academy and even served as her training officer in 2008. He dies in a car crash in 2011.
- Devin Kelley as Julie Elizabeth Sullivan, Raimy's mother and Frank's widow. Once the timeline is changed so that her husband survives, she is killed by the Nightingale.
- Mekhi Phifer as Satch Reyna, Frank's former partner who now runs the 21st Precinct's Detective Squad where Raimy works. He and Stan Moreno were patrol officers in the late 1980s. In the original timeline, Satch's marriage collapsed in the intervening 20 years, and he became estranged from his children.
- Anthony Ruivivar as Stan Moreno, a police captain who is the 21st Precinct commander. He was a narcotics detective in 1996 and was responsible for the undercover operation that resulted in Frank's death. In the original timeline, Moreno, already a legendary narcotics detective, served as Raimy's training officer in 2008. Frank and Raimy believe he is corrupt.
- Lenny Jacobson as Gordo, Raimy's childhood friend
- Daniel Bonjour as Daniel Lawrence, Raimy's fiancé in 2016. When Raimy alters the timeline to save her father, she is horrified to discover that she and Daniel have never met, and he is dating another woman. Nevertheless, she retains memories of their previous romance.

=== Recurring ===
- Sandy Robson as Mike Rainey
- Brad Kelly as "Little Jay" Garza
- Alexandra Metz as Maya Gowan
- Michael Charles Roman as Thomas Goff, a suspect in the Nightingale murders
- David Lipper as Robbie Womack
- Melinda Page Hamilton as Marilyn Goff
- Britt McKillip as young Meghan
- Kenneth Mitchell as Deacon Joe Hurley, a suspect in the Nightingale murders
- Rob Mayes as Kyle Moseby, an NYPD detective who, in the changed timeline, has a sexual relationship with Raimy

== Episodes ==
No.	Title	Directed by	Written by	Original release date	Prod. code	US viewers (millions)
1	"Pilot"	Brad Anderson	Story by : Toby Emmerich; Teleplay by : Jeremy Carver	October 5, 2016	T15.10135	1.35
After lightning strikes the antenna of her dead father Frank's old ham radio, Raimy Sullivan begins to communicate with a man who turns out to be Frank 20 years earlier; they quickly realize they are speaking to each other across time. Both are police officers. In 1996, Frank is going undercover, and in 2016, Raimy is investigating a cold case murder by a serial killer called "the Nightingale" because he targets nurses. She uncovers evidence that Frank, who was shot dead during a botched sting operation, was set up by his superior, Stan Moreno, now the deputy police chief. They prevent Frank's death, but this sets off a butterfly effect cascade of changes; in the new reality, Frank survived the night of the sting, but Raimy's mother was killed by the Nightingale in the late 1990s, and her boyfriend Daniel has never met her.
2	"Signal and Noise"	John Kretchmer	Jeremy Carver	October 12, 2016	T13.20252	1.08
Raimy informs Frank that her mother (Frank's wife), Julie, will be a Nightingale victim. She urges him to warn her, but Frank is hesitant to jeopardize his shaky relationship with Julie and young Raimy. In their respective time frames, both Raimy and he investigate Thomas Goff, a suspect who had a sexual-assault charge filed against him dropped. In 1996, Frank's visit precipitates the escape of a girl named Maya whom Goff kidnapped, exposing his crimes to his mother. In 2016, Raimy discovers that Frank's actions caused the Goffs to move away, and she can no longer find them. Desperate to convince Julie she is in danger, Frank leads her to the radio to speak with Raimy, but she remains silent in fear of further changing their history.
3	"The Near Far Problem"	Nina Lopez-Corrado	Nancy Won	October 19, 2016	T13.20253	1.04
In 2016, Raimy finds where Goff hid Maya under an outbuilding and encourages Frank to pursue that lead in 1996. Frank discovers that the underground space has been cleaned with bleach and finds a footprint that leads him to the woods, where he finds Maya. Raimy is convinced that Goff is the Nightingale, but Frank has doubts. They each track down Goff. In 1996, Goff steps into traffic to avoid prison and dies; in 2016, he vanishes just as Raimy is about to murder him in a blind rage. The Nightingale case remains unchanged, confirming Goff's innocence. Raimy refuses to attend her mother's funeral, straining her relationship with Satch.
4	"Bleed Over"	Michael Fields	Michael Alaimo	October 26, 2016	T13.20255	0.99
In 1996, a young girl, Eva Salinas, is found wandering the streets, having escaped from the Nightingale after he abducted her mother. The traumatic experience keeps her quiet until Frank has young Raimy play with her at the park. She tells Raimy a secret; she saw the Nightingale's face. In 2016, Raimy learns that Eva has been abducted again, but eventually discovers that she has faked the whole thing for attention. Frank asks Raimy to describe the Nightingale sketch from her precinct, and he, in turn, shows it to young Eva. She recalls the Nightingale stalking her mother and describes his vehicle, which Frank recognizes from the park. He tries to approach it, but the driver flees and later burns it.
5	"Seven Three"	Oz Scott	John Dove	November 2, 2016	T13.20254	0.91
In 2016, Raimy discovers that her first collar has been murdered and realizes that she remembers two versions of that day, one from the current timeline, where her father and she arrested him, and one from the timeline where Frank was killed, where she rode with Stan Moreno and found him murdered. Raimy's knowledge of both timelines further implicates Stan as a dirty cop, but she has no hard evidence to prove it. Frank and she use an unaltered file from 1996 to try to flip one of Stan's confidential informants in 2016. After Frank accuses her of cheating on him with Raimy's softball coach, Julie asks him for a divorce.
6	"Deviation"	John Kretchmer	Jeannine Renshaw	November 9, 2016	T13.20256	1.05
At Raimy's insistence, Frank uses the next Nightingale victim as bait. He saves her life, but the Nightingale escapes, knocking him unconscious and taking a family photo from his wallet. In 2016, Raimy speaks to a tipster in prison who specifically requested her. He introduces himself as Karl Pierce, a mentally unstable quantum physicist, who claims to have discovered the same phenomenon as Raimy, which led him to kill his neighbor at the urging of his future self. He suggests that the only way to stop the Nightingale is to kill him in the past. Raimy dismisses him, but changes her mind after discovering that the woman Frank saved has become a Nightingale victim in 2016.
7	"Break, Break, Break"	Tim Hunter	Lina Patel	November 16, 2016	T13.20257	0.97
In 1996, Frank is approached by his former lover, Miracella Corrado, whom he met while undercover and is now seeking refuge from Stan, who had her brother Jay murdered to cover up his attempt on Frank's life. Discovering the affair, Julie retaliates by rekindling her relationship with Raimy's softball coach, Ted. In 2016, Satch wants to retire after his wife divorces him, but Raimy convinces him not to when they find a major clue to the Nightingale's identity. A new victim, Larissa Abbot, is found at an old Christian hideaway camp where she was a nurse in 1994, and Raimy determines that whoever killed her must have worked at the camp at the same time.
8	"Interference"	Tara Nicole Weyr	Tom Farrell	November 30, 2016	T13.20258	0.97
After watching a press conference where Raimy appeals for information about the hideaway camp, a woman named Meghan tries to contact her, but is prevented from doing so by the staff at the mental health clinic where she is held. A man who helped troubled youth at the camp, Deacon Joe Hurley, of whom she is terrified, is approached for information about the camp by the police. Raimy's date with her new boyfriend, Kyle Moseby, is interrupted by a drunk Daniel, forcing Raimy to abandon Kyle so that she can take him home. He admits he cannot stop thinking about her and they share a kiss, but she leaves after finding the ring he plans to give to his girlfriend. He later visits Raimy again and they have sex. In 1996, Frank searches Larissa's belongings with her family's permission and learns she was friends with Meghan at the camp. He also finds out about Julie's affair with Ted, but eventually gives her his blessing to continue.
9	"Gray Line"	John Showalter	Nancy Won	December 7, 2016	T13.20259	0.85
In 1996, Frank sets up a sting to expose Stan's corruption, but Satch tips him off and Frank is warned not to mess with Stan again. Frank and Julie reconcile after he comes to her wanting to tell her about his time undercover. Frank also tracks down a younger Meghan and learns of her suspicions that her stepfather Joe murdered her mother and brother. In 2016, Meghan escapes the clinic and calls Raimy, but is abducted. Raimy breaks into Deacon Joe's house and finds the mummified remains of Meghan's mother; the Deacon attacks her and escapes, launching a manhunt. Raimy warns Frank that Joe is the Nightingale and must be killed to save Julie, to which Frank reluctantly agrees.
10	"The Edison Effect"	Rob Seidenglanz	John Dove	January 4, 2017	T13.20260	0.67
Having finally identified Deacon Joe as the Nightingale, Raimy helps her father prepare to murder him. Frank goes along with her plan, but questions whether it will cause more harm than good to the timeline; Raimy insists that doing so is the only way to save Julie. Kyle winds up in the hospital after being injured in a pursuit, and Raimy and he share a tender moment. Meghan manages to call the police, who trace her phone to a remote cabin; despite Raimy's best efforts, Joe kills Meghan and flees. After chasing him down, she murders him in cold blood and surrenders her firearm to another officer. Meanwhile, Frank succeeds in abducting Joe, but ends up in a car crash after receiving a call from Julie.
11	"Negative Copy"	John Behring	Michael Alaimo	January 11, 2017	T13.20261	0.74
Joe escapes from Frank's car, foiling Raimy's plan. Her actions are subsequently investigated as misconduct, and her badge is confiscated. Fearing that Joe will target his family, Frank concocts a new plan to frame him for theft. Unfortunately, this results in an alternate timeline where Joe was never caught in the first place, erasing all of Raimy's progress. Realizing that he will almost certainly kill Meghan in 2016 to cover his tracks, they decide to find her. Julie covers for Frank when Satch comes by their house to investigate, but he eventually figures out that she is lying. Out of desperation, Frank plants a bag of cash in Joe's house and has him arrested, while Raimy breaks into his cabin, finding Meghan and her brother alive in the nearby woods.
12	"Harmonic"	Stefan Pleszczynski	Jeannine Renshaw	January 18, 2017	T13.20262	0.73
Raimy takes Meghan and Robbie to the hospital, where she learns that the latter has been living under an alias for 20 years after running away from home. Frank tries to get Joe to confess, but he fakes a beating and is allowed to leave. Raimy and Satch find the evidence needed to get Joe arrested, and Raimy gives him her shoelaces to commit suicide in return for the location of his wife's body, which Frank then uses to identify Joe as the Nightingale. Raimy discovers that her mother is now alive in 2016, while Robbie, having been reunited with his sister by Frank, returns to his apartment in 1996 and inspects a collection of photos of Julie before going to sleep.
13	"Signal Loss"	Thomas Wright	Jeremy Carver & Nancy Won	January 25, 2017	T13.20263	0.79
In the new timeline, Frank still dies in 2011, but Julie is now a doctor, Gordo is a lawyer, Satch's marriage is intact, no Nightingale murders have occurred since Joe's arrest, and Raimy and Daniel are engaged. By chance, Raimy encounters Robbie and becomes suspicious of him, convincing Frank to visit Robbie and Meghan in 1996 and make further inquiries about Joe. This unbalances Robbie, and he tells Meghan that he is the Nightingale and that Joe took the blame for him. Robbie murders Meghan and then attacks Julie, Raimy, and Gordo, shoots Gordo's father, and destroys the ham radio, cutting off contact with Raimy in 2016. Despite their bad blood, Stan races to help Frank rescue his family, but is shot by a vengeful Miracella before he can reach the scene. Frank is shot by Robbie, who tries to flee with a captive Julie, but Satch stops them and rescues Julie, though Robbie escapes. Raimy is relieved to find the present relatively unchanged in 2016, but Robbie remains at large.

On May 13, 2017, The CW released an epilogue to the series to provide closure after its cancellation, in which the radio is fixed and Frank and Raimy confirm that the Nightingale died in prison. Raimy also reveals the date of Frank's car accident to him before the radio fizzles out. Raimy frantically continues to try to call out to her father on the radio until her father's voice is heard from behind her say: "I got it kiddo." She turns around to see her father there in person and they embrace.

== Broadcast ==
Netflix acquired the exclusive broadcast rights to Frequency in the United Kingdom, Ireland, India, Canada, and Oceania, adding new episodes to its platform less than a day after their original U.S. broadcast.

== Reception ==
=== Critical response ===
Frequency received generally positive reviews from critics. Review aggregator Rotten Tomatoes gives the series a score of 75% based on 24 reviews. The consensus says, "Frequency's confusing timeline and somewhat familiar dramatic framework are offset by solid acting and an intriguingly loaded premise." On Metacritic, the show has a weighted average of 64/100 based on 21 reviews, indicating "generally favorable reviews".

=== Ratings ===
Viewership and ratings per episode of Frequency
No.	Title	Air date	Rating/share (18–49)	Viewers (millions)	DVR (18–49)	DVR viewers (millions)	Total (18–49)	Total viewers (millions)
1	"Pilot"	October 5, 2016	0.4/1	1.35	0.2	0.71	0.6	2.06
2	"Signal and Noise"	October 12, 2016	0.3/1	1.08	0.3	0.77	0.6	1.85
3	"The Near Far Problem"	October 19, 2016	0.3/1	1.04	0.2	0.66	0.5	1.71
4	"Bleed Over"	October 26, 2016	0.3/1	0.99	0.2	0.73	0.5	1.72
5	"Seven Three"	November 2, 2016	0.3/1	0.91	0.2	0.73	0.5	1.63
6	"Deviation"	November 9, 2016	0.3/1	1.05	0.2	0.61	0.5	1.66
7	"Break, Break, Break"	November 16, 2016	0.3/1	0.97	0.2	—N/a	0.5	—N/a
8	"Interference"	November 30, 2016	0.3/1	0.97	0.2	0.61	0.5	1.57
9	"Gray Line"	December 7, 2016	0.2/1	0.85	—N/a	0.45	—N/a	1.29
10	"The Edison Effect"	January 4, 2017	0.2/1	0.67	TBD	TBD	TBD	TBD
11	"Negative Copy"	January 11, 2017	0.2/1	0.74	TBD	TBD	TBD	TBD
12	"Harmonic"	January 18, 2017	0.2/1	0.73	TBD	TBD	TBD	TBD
13	"Signal Loss"	January 25, 2017	0.3/1	0.79	—N/a	0.43	—N/a	1.22

== See also ==
- Ditto (2000 film)
