= Graciana Chironi =

Argentine actress

Graciana Abraciano de Chironi (1921 – February 4, 2017) was an Argentine film actress.

Chironi was the grandmother of well-known Argentine director Pablo Trapero.

She worked in the cinema of Argentina.

== Filmography ==
- Negocios (1995) (short)
- Mundo grúa (1999) a.k.a. Crane World
- El Bonaerense (2002)
- Familia rodante (2004) a.k.a. Rolling Family
