= The Quietude =

2018 film directed by Pablo Trapero

The Quietude (Spanish: La quietud) is a 2018 Argentinian drama film directed by Pablo Trapero, with Sony Pictures International Productions (SPIP) as a co-producer.

Principal photography started in Buenos Aires in December 2017. The film stars Martina Gusmán and Bérénice Bejo as sisters, along with Édgar Ramírez, Graciela Borges, and Joaquín Furriel.

The film premiered at the 75th Venice International Film Festival.

== Cast ==
- Martina Gusmán as Mía Montemayor
- Bérénice Bejo as Eugenia Montemayor
- Édgar Ramírez as Vincent
- Joaquín Furriel as Esteban López Falbo
- Graciela Borges as Esmeralda Montemayor
- Noemí Sayago as Raquel
- Alejandro Viola as attorney
- Isidoro Tolkachir as Augusto Montemayor
- Carlos Rivkin as Nicanor
