= Ulysses (2011 film) =

2011 film

- Film poster
- Directed by: Oscar Godoy
- Written by: Oscar Godoy; Daniel Laguna
- Produced by: Juan de Dios Larraín; Pablo Larraín
- Starring: Jorge Román
- Cinematography: Inti Briones
- Production company: Fábula
- Release date: April 26, 2011 (San Francisco International Film Festival)
- Running time: 85 minutes
- Countries: Chile; Argentina
- Language: Spanish

Ulysses (Spanish: Ulises) is a 2011 drama film directed by Oscar Godoy and written by Godoy and Laguna.

== Plot ==
The movie chronicles the life of Julio (Jorge Román), a Peruvian immigrant in Chile who works as a university history professor. He lives in deep loneliness, without decent housing or relationships with others, but persists with tenacity in his mission to work and send money to his mother in Peru. The film depicts his daily struggle to fit into a foreign country that rejects him, as he longs for home like a modern-day Ulysses condemned to eternal wandering.

== Cast ==
- Jorge Román as Julio
- Francisca Gavilán as Flavia
