= Alien Arsenal =

1999 film

- Written by: Matthew Jason Walsh
- Directed by: David DeCoteau
- Starring: Josh Hammond; Danielle Hoover; Michele Nordin; Krisztián Kovács; Jerrod Cornish; William Vogt; Riley Smith; Dominic Catrambone; Stephanie Mennella; Chris Olivero; Robert Donavan; Brenda Blondell; Brannon Gould; Matt Steveley; Joe Danzo; Heath Titan; Scott Boyer; Ryan Van Steenis; Betheny Zolt; Michelle A. Katz; Jessica Kiper; Walsh Creen Carvalino; Kim Robert Koscki
- Original language: English

Production
- Executive producer: Charles Band
- Producer: Kirk Edward Hansen
- Running time: 90 minutes
- Production company: The Kushner-Locke Company

Original release
- Network: syndication
- Release: May 18, 1999

Alien Arsenal is a 1999 made-for-television science fiction film directed by David DeCoteau. It is a loose remake of an earlier Charles Band production, Laserblast. It is also known as Teenage Alien Avengers.

== Premise ==
Ralph and Baxter are two high school nerds who are often tormented by bullies at their school. They find a secret chamber which contains a hoard of hi-tech weapons and armor, their superhero dreams become reality. They use these weapons to get back at the bullies as well as to fulfill some superhero fantasies.

But the alien owners are alerted to the discovery, and return to claim their property in a bid to use it to wipe out humanity. The aliens enlist the help of one of the bullies, Monty, to get the alien equipment back.

Monty and Ralph discover that they are both being used by the aliens to download an Armageddon Beam which will wipe out all human life on earth.

== Production ==
Director David DeCoteau used the pseudonym Julian Breen. A featurette called the Making of Alien Arsenal was completed in 1999. It is included on some DVDs.

== Home Release ==
The movie has been released on home DVD and is available to stream on various services

== Cast ==
- Josh Hammond as Ralph
- Danielle Hoover as Baxter
- Michele Nordin as Felicia
- Krisztián Kovács as Flash
- Jerrod Cornish as Monty
- William Vogt as Lance
- Riley Smith as Chad
- Dominic Catrambone as Phil
- Stephanie Mennella as Jill
- Chris Olivero as Bill
- Robert Donovan as Mr. Lipkis
- Brenda Blondell as Mrs. O'Houlihan

== Reception ==
TV Guide gave the movie one star calling in an underachieving mixture of Revenge of the Nerds and Laserblast The also found elements of RoboCop and the Mighty Morphin Power Rangers but found the movie lacking in original ideas. Moria gave the movie two out of five stars finding the effects poor and the superheros banal. It did find that the tongue in cheek humor occasionally works.
