= Life on a String (film) =

- DVD release cover
- Directed by: Chen Kaige
- Written by: Chen Kaige; Novel: Shi Tiesheng
- Produced by: Karl Baumgartner; Cai Rubin; Donald Ranvaud
- Starring: Liu Zhongyuan; Huang Lei; Xu Qing
- Cinematography: Gu Changwei
- Edited by: Pei Xiaonan
- Music by: Qu Xiaosong
- Distributed by: United States (DVD): Kino International
- Release date: 1991
- Running time: 110 minutes
- Country: China
- Language: Mandarin

Life on a String (simplified Chinese: 边走边唱; traditional Chinese: 邊走邊唱; pinyin: Biān zǒu biān chàng; lit. 'Walking and singing at the same time') is a 1991 Chinese film by acclaimed film director Chen Kaige. Made before his international breakthrough Farewell, My Concubine, Life on a String is a more intimate and philosophical affair, telling the story of a blind sanxian player and his young disciple. The film was based on the novel Life on a String (命若琴弦) by Shi Tiesheng. The film was entered into the 1991 Cannes Film Festival.

== Plot ==
In the vast, desolate mountains of northwest China, an elderly blind musician known as Shenshen has spent sixty years wandering village to village, playing his three-stringed lute and telling stories, sustained by his late master's promise: inside the instrument's body lies a prescription that will restore his sight once he has snapped a thousand strings. He takes on a young blind apprentice named Shitou, passing on the same hope. When they arrive in a remote village plagued by clan feuds, Shitou falls deeply in love with a local girl, Lanxiu, leading to heartbreak and violence that shakes his faith in the distant dream of sight.

As Shenshen finally breaks his thousandth string and discovers the "prescription" is nothing but a blank sheet of paper—a deliberate lie to give life tension and purpose—he confronts the emptiness yet chooses to perpetuate the illusion by sealing the same blank paper into Shitou's instrument, urging him to snap even more strings. The film ends with the master and apprentice continuing their endless journey across the barren landscape, embodying the bittersweet truth that life's meaning lies not in unreachable destinations, but in the taut, resonant strings of hope that keep one moving forward.

== Cast ==
- Liu Zhongyuan as the Old Master, a master blind sanxian player, as a child he was told that upon wearing out his 1000th string, his sight would be restored.
- Huang Lei as Shitou, his young disciple.
- Xu Qing as Lanxiu
