= Shi Tiesheng =

Chinese novelist and essayist

- 史铁生
- Born: 4 January 1951; Beijing, China
- Died: 31 December 2010 (aged 59); Beijing, China
- Occupation: Writer
- Writing career
- Period: 1979–2010
- Genres: essay, novel, novella

Shi Tiesheng (Chinese: 史铁生; 4 January 1951 – 31 December 2010) was a Chinese essayist and novelist, known for his profound philosophical reflections on disability, suffering, fate, faith, and the human condition. Often referred to as a "writer in a wheelchair," his works integrate autobiographical experiences with deep existential inquiry. The China Daily stated that "Many critics have considered I and the Temple of Earth as one of the best Chinese prose essays of the 20th century." After his death, Shi has experienced a significant resurgence in popularity, particularly among young readers in the 21st century, who find spiritual guidance and transcendence in his writings amid modern challenges.

== Life ==
Shi was born in Beijing, and graduated from Tsinghua University High School. In 1969, during the Cultural Revolution, he was sent to a rural village in Shaanxi Province as part of the Down to the Countryside Movement. In 1972, at age 21, he became paralyzed in both legs due to a spinal condition and returned to Beijing, where he spent the rest of his life using a wheelchair. Later, he developed uremia, requiring regular dialysis from the late 1990s onward. On the morning of December 31, 2010, Shi died of cerebral hemorrhage. Following his wishes, his liver was donated and transplanted to a patient in Tianjin.

Shi Tiesheng once wrote, "At the end of my twenty-first year, my legs betrayed me. I didn't die, thanks entirely to friendship." Among his friends are writers Yu Hua, Mo Yan, and Bei Dao. Yu Hua and Shi Tiesheng met in Beijing's literary circle in the 1980s, the two developed a profound connection marked by warmth, humor, and support. An anecdote from the early 1990s captures their spirit: Yu Hua and fellow writers carried Shi onto a train for a trip to Shenyang, then placed him in goal during an impromptu football match, jokingly warning opponents that kicking toward him might "kill" him. Shi was an active sportsman and excelled at football before becoming paralyzed and remained an avid sports fan throughout his life.

Shi Tiesheng met his wife Chen Ximi (born 1961) in the late 1970s through a fan letter she sent after reading his 1979 short story "The Fate of Love". She was a university student at Northwest University and editor of the campus magazine Hope. They corresponded for about a decade without seeing each other in person, developing a deep emotional and intellectual bond. In 1989, Chen traveled from Xi'an to Beijing to visit Shi when Shi's health was deteriorating due to complications from paralysis and kidney disease. They married in the summer of 1989 at ages 38 (Shi) and 28 (Chen) in a simple ceremony. Both had physical disabilities—Shi paralyzed in both legs, Chen with a mild limp in one leg due to poliomyelitis. Chen kept company to and cared for Shi until his death.

== Career ==
Shi began publishing fiction in 1979. His early works drew from his experiences as a sent-down youth and rural life, emerging during the post-Cultural Revolution scar literature period. His writing later shifted toward philosophical and religious themes, exploring love, redemption, and transcendence.

He was a resident writer with the Beijing Writers Association and served as its vice chairman, as well as a member of the national committee of the China Writers Association.

=== Notable works ===
- "My Faraway Qingpingwan'' (我的遥远的清平湾, 1983), a short story that won the National Excellent Short Story Prize. The story is about a sent-down youth and an old man of the village, and takes the view that the peasants suffer more over the long term than the urban youth sent from the city. A sequel, A Story of Rustication (插队的故事), was published in 1986.
- Like a Banjo String (命若琴弦, 1985), a novella adapted into the 1991 film ''Life on a String'' directed by Chen Kaige.
- I and the Temple of Earth (我与地坛, 1991), a landmark essay on life, death, and maternal love, widely regarded as one of the finest Chinese prose pieces of the 20th century.
- Notes on Principles (务虚笔记, 1996), a novel viewed as a milestone in Chinese religious-philosophical fiction. In selecting it as a notable work of Chinese literature since 1949 that could qualify as an overlooked classic, Professor Shelley W. Chan of Wittenberg University said Notes on Principles was comparable to and "even better" than Soul Mountain by Nobel Prize-winner Gao Xingjian, for its "profoundly meditative take on existential themes" and the author's "painstaking interrogation of the human soul".
- Fragments Written in the Hiatus of Illness (病隙碎笔, 2002), a collection of meditative essays composed during dialysis treatments.
- My Sojourn in Ding Yi (我的丁一之旅, 2006), about an immortal spirit that inhabits the bodies of a succession of people, including Adam, Shi Tiesheng himself, and the book's hero, Ding Yi. An English translation of this novel was published by Sinoist Books in 2019.

In 1980 director Tian Zhuangzhuang based a short film called Our Corner on a story by Shi; it was the first film by a filmmaker of China's Fifth Generation Cinema.

His collections of short stories include My Faraway Clear Peace River (我的遥远的清平湾) (1985) and Sunday (礼拜日) (1988).

A collection of English-language translations of his short stories was published in 1991 as Strings of Life.

=== Awards and legacy ===
Shi received numerous accolades, including the National Excellent Short Story Prize (1983), the Lao She Literary Award (2002), and the Sinophone Literature and Media Award (2003). His works have been widely influential, included in school textbooks, translated internationally, and adapted for stage and screen.

According to a 2024 Douyin Reading Ecosystem Report, Shi Tiesheng ranked as the platform's most popular author, with related videos totaling 186,000 (up 192%), viewing time surging 415%, and shares increasing 51%. The primary fans are 00s readers, followed by 90s and 80s generations. Sales of his I and the Temple of Earth skyrocketed 357%.
