= I and the Temple of Earth =

"I and the Temple of Earth" (Chinese: 我与地坛; pinyin: Wǒ yǔ Dìtán; also translated as "The Temple of Earth and Me" or "The Temple of Earth and I") is an essay by Chinese writer Shi Tiesheng, first published in 1991. It is an autobiographical reflection on disability, suffering, maternal love, life and death, fate, and spiritual transcendence, framed through the author's repeated visits to Beijing's Temple of Earth park after becoming paralyzed at age 21. Regarded as one of the most profound and influential works of 20th century Chinese prose, the essay has been included in educational anthologies and discussed in academic studies, and it has attracted renewed attention among younger readers in the 21st century.

== Background ==
Shi Tiesheng (1951–2010) was a Beijing-born essayist and novelist whose work was shaped by personal experience. In 1969, during the Cultural Revolution, he was sent to rural Shaanxi as part of the Down to the Countryside Movement. In 1972, at the age of 21, he sustained a spinal injury that resulted in permanent paralysis from the waist down. After returning to Beijing, Shi spent extended periods in the Temple of Earth, a Ming dynasty park historically used for imperial sacrificial rites. Over approximately fifteen years, the site became a regular setting for observation and reflection.

The essay emerged from this period of introspection and was published in 1991, a year after Shi married Chen Ximi. It draws on Shi's encounters with the park's natural cycles, historical structures, and human visitors, transforming personal crisis into universal inquiry influenced by Christian belief and existential thought.

== Content ==
The essay, which exceeds 13,000 words, is divided into seven sections. It opens with Shi's discovery of the Temple of Earth as a place of refuge after the onset of his disability, describing it as an "abandoned" yet eternal space where he could confront despair without societal judgment. He recounts years spent observing seasonal changes, ancient cypresses, and passersby—including a persistent elderly couple, a dedicated long-distance runner, children at play, and a young woman with intellectual disabilities. These episodes serve as points of reflections on human diversity, suffering, and the search for meaning.

A pivotal section addresses his mother's hidden anguish and sacrificial love, revealed only after her death, expressing profound regret for his earlier self-absorption. The narrative progresses toward acceptance of fate, viewing disability as revealing deeper truths about vulnerability, resilience, and the necessity of difference in human existence. Death is addressed as an inevitable aspect of life, emphasizing endurance and spiritual insight over despair.

== Theme ==
Scholarly analyses highlight several core themes:

- Disability as anthropological insight: Shi reframes physical impairment not as mere tragedy but as a fundamental human condition exposing vulnerability, strength, and the diversity of existence, challenging stigmatization and aligning with disability theology perspectives.
- Suffering, fate, and transcendence: Drawing on religious and philosophical sources, including biblical narratives such as the Book of Job and existential thought, the work examines suffering as a test or condition of existence rather than as punishment, and considers the possibility of meaning within adversity.
- Maternal love and remorse: The figure of Shi’s mother forms a central thread, depicting her sustained care and unspoken distress, and Shi’s later recognition of this sacrifice after her death, framed through themes of remorse and filial responsibility.
- Nature, space, and spiritual sanctuary: The Temple of Earth functions as an interactive space fostering introspection, where historical continuity and natural cycles mirror inner journeys toward acceptance.
- Intertextuality and thematic continuity: Read in relation to Shi’s other writings, such as “Autumn Reminiscence” and "The Tree of Reconciliation", the essay develops recurring themes of motherhood, writing, suffering, and moral reflection through explicit and implicit cross-references.

== Reception and legacy ==
The essay was well received in the literary circle upon its initial publication in 1991. Han Shaogong commented that "The publication of this essay alone made 1991 a good harvest year for Chinese literature". Critics have acclaimed the essay as a pinnacle of 20th-century Chinese prose, praising its meditative depth and humanistic philosophy. It became a staple in Chinese secondary and post-secondary textbooks since the late 1990s to early 2000s. Fellow writer Wang Anyi observed that Shi's disability and suffering might have turned his biggest asset and creative drive.

After Shi’s death, the work attracted renewed readership and discussion, often in connection with broader contemporary interest in questions of meaning and personal adversity.
