= Donald Ranvaud =

British film producer and film journalist

- Born: 5 December 1953; Florence, Tuscany, Italy
- Died: 5 September 2016 (aged 62); Montreal, Quebec, Canada
- Occupation(s): Film producer and journalist

Donald Ranvaud (5 December 1953 - 5 September 2016) was a British film producer and film journalist.

Ranvaud had producing roles on a number of Oscar-nominated films including The Constant Gardener (2005), City of God (2002), Central Station (1998) and Farewell My Concubine (1993). He is now best known for his work in the Latin American film industry, especially in Brazil and Bolivia.

== Early career ==
From 1976–88, Ranvaud taught at the University of Warwick (English and comparative literature) and the University of East Anglia (film studies) and also at the College of South Wales (film theory). During this time he also worked as a freelance journalist for MFB, Sight and Sound, The Guardian, La Repubblica and American Film, as well as founding the independent cinema and media magazine Framework, which he edited until 1988. He published several books on Italian cinema and directed documentary items for C4 magazine programmes and RAI 1, including portraits of Paul Schrader, Raul Ruiz, Cui Jian, Laurie Anderson and David Mamet.

In April 1989 Ranvaud was hired as Head of Selection at the European Script Fund, which was established in January 1989 by Renee Goddard (Secretary General) as part of the MEDIA Programme of the Commission of the European Community. He stayed on for 18 months, selecting numerous feature film projects from across Europe for develop funding; during this time the Media Programme was fully integrated into EC policy.

== Death ==
Ranvaud was on the jury of the 2016 Montreal World Film Festival. He was taken to the hospital after calling for assistance in his hotel room in Montreal on the night of the last day of the festival. He was treated for a heart disorder.

== Film production ==
Ranvaud worked as a producer full-time after 1989, working with directors and in countries that would soon become prominent in the world of independent film: in China from 1989 to 1993, he produced Life on a String and Farewell My Concubine; in Latin America from 1994 to present, he produced Central do Brasil, Familia Rodante, Xango de Baker Street, Lavoura Arcaica, Babilonia 2000, Madame Sata, and City of God, garnering a total of 12 Oscar nominations. He was also executive producer on The Constant Gardener by Fernando Meirelles in Kenya.

Alongside productions, he managed sales at Videofilmes, Bouquet Multimedia and Sogepaq as well as helping to set up the Wild Bunch.

As Buena Onda's Creative Director since 2003, Ranvaud continued to discover filmmakers, helping them to access world markets. He was an ambassador for Latin American cinema, setting up joint ventures with Cinergia in Costa Rica for Centro America, and with the Puerto Rico Film Fund. After establishing the film school La Fabrica with Roberto Lanza in Cochabamba, Bolivia, he set up an Institute for 2nd features, theatre and cinema (Artes Andes Americas), together with Cesar Brie's Teatro de los Andes in Yotala, Bolivia.

Since early 2005, first as Head of International Relations with Rain Networks, Brasil, and later independently, Ranvaud focused on what he considered to be the central question for the future of a possible cinema – a cost-effective distribution platform. Ranvaud’s final film as a producer is a still-unfinished first feature titled “Sweet Democracy,” 2016, with Italian Nobel-prize winning thesp Dario Fo among the cast. It is directed by Italy’s Michele Diomà.

== Filmography ==
Year	Film	Role	Other notes
1989	Speaking Parts	Executive producer	
1991	Life on a String	Producer	
1993	Buccaneer Soul (Alma Corsária)	Producer	
1993	Farewell My Concubine (Ba wang bie ji)	Associate producer	
1996	Tieta Do Agreste	Producer	
1998	Central Station (Central Do Brasil)	Executive producer	
1999	Babilonia 2000	Producer	
2000	Turbulence (Estorvo)	Producer	
2001	To The Left of The Father (Lavoura Arcaica)	Associate producer	
2001	Smokers Only (Vagón Fumador)	Producer	
2001	Xango de Baker Street	Producer	
2002	City of God (Cidade De Deus)	Co-producer	
2002	Madame Satã	Producer	
2004	Con Game (Doble Juego)	Producer	
2004	Rolling Family (Familia Rodante)	Producer	
2005	Lower City (Cidade Baixa)	Associate producer	
2005	The Constant Gardener	Executive producer	
2006	Cobrador: In God We Trust	Executive producer	
2006	Coca Lives	Producer	
2006	Who Killed The White Llama?	Producer	
2007	Evo Pueblo	Producer	
2007	Maldeamores	Executive producer	
2007	Not By Chance (Nao Por Acaso)	Associate producer	
2007	Cochochi	Producer	
2007	Gasolina	Producer	
2007	The New American Century	Associate producer	
2008	Nunca Mas!	Producer	
2008	Tentayape: The Last House	Producer	
2009	Oso Blanco	Producer	
2009	Un día más	Associate producer	
2016	North Pole	Executive Producer	
