= Riley Smith =

American actor (born 1978)

- Born: April 12, 1978 (age 48); Cedar Rapids, Iowa, U.S.
- Occupation: Actor
- Years active: 1998–present
- Children: 1

Riley Smith (born April 12, 1978) is an American actor. He is known for his roles on television, such as recurring roles in the series 24, Joan of Arcadia, 90210, True Blood and The Messengers, and starring roles on the television series Drive, Frequency, and Nancy Drew.

== Early life and education ==
Smith's parents are Russ and Roxanne Smith. He was born in Cedar Rapids, Iowa, and raised in Marion, Iowa on his parents’ horse ranch. He became an accomplished rider, competing in a horse show for the first time when he was 9 years old. When he was 15, he placed 4th in 3-Year-Old Mares division at the American Quarter Horse Youth World Championship, and at 16 won the American Quarter Horse Youth World Championship. When he was 17, he became president of the 50,000-member youth association, becoming the youngest person to serve as president of American Quarter Horse Youth Association.

He graduated from Alburnett Junior-Senior High School in 1997, and his original intention was to earn a college degree to complement his Equine interests, but he was "discovered" at the Westdale Mall in Cedar Rapids by a local talent scout and flew to New York City to compete at the International Modeling and Talent Association (IMTA) Convention. He was signed to a Tommy Hilfiger modeling campaign. He used the money he earned to pay for acting classes.

== Career ==
=== Television work ===
Three months after the Hilfiger campaign, Smith flew to Los Angeles to do a screen test for The WB's 1998 pilot Minor Threat, but the pilot was not picked up. Subsequently, he went on to do eight prime time network pilots, and more than a dozen guest-starring roles, and played recurring character roles in three television series.

Smith had recurring roles in the CBS series Joan of Arcadia, the Fox series 24 season 3 as Kyle Singer, the short-lived WB series Summerland and the Judd Apatow NBC series Freaks and Geeks. He was also a main cast member in the short-lived Fox show Drive. Smith played Dean Talon in the Disney Channel movie Motocrossed. He played a love interest and mentor to Andrea "Andy" Carson on the race track.

In 2008 Smith joined in collaboration with The Academy of Cinema and Television to create an online educational series for children and teens interested in the entertainment industry, and in 2009 he appeared in an episode of Ghost Whisperer, a paranormal television series starring Jennifer Love Hewitt. He appeared in seven episodes of the fifth season of 90210 as Riley Wallace, in 2012–2013.

In 2014 Smith played the role of Keith in the HBO series True Blood. In 2015, he played Markus Keen in the ABC musical drama series Nashville. In 2016, he starred as Frank Sullivan in the CW drama series, Frequency.

=== Film work ===
Smith has appeared in the film Eight Legged Freaks, Not Another Teen Movie, Radio, New York Minute, Bring It On, and the Sundance Film Festival Grand Jury nominee Weapons.

For the film New York Minute, he and co-star Jared Padalecki were hand-picked for their roles by stars Mary-Kate and Ashley Olsen. After his role as Jim, the love interest for Ashley's character of Jane, he admitted that he could not tell the sisters apart.

In Radio, Smith had the role of Johnny Clay, team star and ringleader of the group pulling nasty pranks on Cuba Gooding, Jr.'s character of Radio. For their work in the film, key production members were awarded a 2005 CAMIE Award; These included executive producer Todd Garner, director Michael Tollin, screenwriter Mike Rich, and actors Cuba Gooding Jr., Ed Harris, Riley Smith, Alfre Woodard, Brent Sexton, S. Epatha Merkerson and Sarah Drew.

He played Russ, the love interest of Mary Elizabeth Winstead's character in the dancing film Make It Happen.

=== Music ===
Smith took up the guitar to fill downtime while on film sets, and in 2006, he and Henri O'Connor formed the band "The Life of Riley", of which he is guitarist and lead singer. His original idea was to write music that could be used in his films, but when he and his band had written 16 songs, they picked 11 and cut an album. As of August 2010, the Los Angeles–based group has released three CDs: The Life of Riley (2007), Long Way Home EP (2009) and Live in Hollywood at the Hotel Cafe (2010). They have also performed at such music festivals as the New Bohemia Music Festival.

== Filmography ==
=== Film ===
| Year | Title | Role | Notes |
|---|---|---|---|
| 1999 | Lovers Lane | Michael Lamson | |
| 2000 | Voodoo Academy | Christopher Sawyer | |
| 2000 | Bring It On | Tim | |
| 2001 | Not Another Teen Movie | Les | |
| 2002 | Eight Legged Freaks | Randy | |
| 2002 | Full Ride | Matt Sabo | |
| 2003 | National Lampoon's Barely Legal | Jake | |
| 2003 | Radio | Johnny Clay | |
| 2004 | New York Minute | Jim | |
| 2004 | The Plight of Clownana | Riley | |
| 2007 | Weapons | Jason | |
| 2007 | White Air | Alexi | |
| 2007 | Graduation | Chaucer Boyle | |
| 2009 | Make It Happen | Russ | |
| 2010 | Minuteman | Lance Deakin | |
| 2012 | Gallowwalkers | Fabulos | |
| 2014 | Shirin in Love | William | |
| 2016 | Bleed | Eric | |
| 2022 | Get Away If You Can | Graham | |

=== Television ===
| Year | Film | Role | Notes |
|---|---|---|---|
| 1998 | One World | Riley | 1 episode |
| 1999 | Alien Arsenal | Chad | Television movie |
| 1999 | 7th Heaven | Tyler | 1 episode |
| 2000 | Freaks and Geeks | Todd Schellinger | Recurring role, 5 episodes |
| 2000 | Hang Time | Dave Carter | 1 episode |
| 2000 | Wild Grizzly | Josh Harding | Television movie |
| 2000–2001 | Once and Again | Pace | 2 episodes |
| 2001 | Chestnut Hill | Jamie Eastman | Unsold television pilot |
| 2001 | Motocrossed | Dean Talon | Disney Channel Original Movie |
| 2001 | Gideon's Crossing | Derek Fitzhugh | 3 episodes |
| 2001 | All About Us | Jeremy | 1 episode |
| 2002 | Eastwick | Dakota | Unsold television pilot |
| 2002 | Raising Dad | Jared Ashby | Recurring role, 9 episodes |
| 2002 | Boston Public | Mark | 1 episode |
| 2002 | Birds of Prey | 18 Year Old 'Guy' | Episode: "Three Birds and a Baby" |
| 2003 | CSI: Miami | Jack | 1 episode |
| 2003 | Peacemakers | Eric Soper | 1 episode |
| 2003 | 24 | Kyle Singer | Recurring role, 6 episodes |
| 2004 | Summerland | Tanner | 2 episodes |
| 2004 | Hawaii | Sheldon | 1 episode |
| 2004–2005 | Joan of Arcadia | Andy Baker | Recurring role, 5 episodes |
| 2005 | Spring Break Shark Attack | Shane Jones | Television movie |
| 2006 | The Way | Karl | Unsold television pilot |
| 2007 | Drive | Rob Laird | Main role, 6 episodes |
| 2007 | CSI: Crime Scene Investigation | Jordan Rockwell | 1 episode |
| 2007 | Women's Murder Club | Jamie Galvan | 1 episode |
| 2008 | Criminal Minds | Ryan Phillips | 1 episode |
| 2008 | The Madness of Jane | Dane | Unsold television pilot |
| 2009 | Ghost Whisperer | Sean Flannery | Episode: "Head Over Heels" |
| 2010 | Night and Day | Jim Pollard | Unsold television pilot |
| 2010 | Leverage | Sophie's Dr. Abernathy | Episode: "The Rashomon Job" |
| 2011 | The Glades | Greg | Episode: "Breakout" |
| 2011 | Cooper and Stone | Danny Kovacs | Unsold television pilot |
| 2011 | The Closer | Trey Gavin | Episode: "An Ugly Game" |
| 2012–2013 | 90210 | Riley Wallace | Recurring role, 7 episodes |
| 2013 | Christmas in Conway | Tommy Harris | Television movie |
| 2014 | True Blood | Keith | Recurring role, 5 episodes |
| 2014 | Deliverance Creek | Toby | Television movie |
| 2014 | 10,000 Days | Sam Beck | Television movie |
| 2015 | True Detective | Steve Mercier | 2 episodes |
| 2015 | The Messengers | Mark Plowman | Recurring role, 6 episodes |
| 2015 | Nashville | Markus Keen | Recurring role, 7 episodes |
| 2016 | CSI: Cyber | Keith Walker | Episode: "Fit-and-Run" |
| 2016 | Urban Cowboy | Wes | Unsold television pilot |
| 2016–2017 | Frequency | Frank Sullivan | Main role |
| 2018 | Life Sentence | Dr. Will Grant | Recurring role |
| 2019 | Proven Innocent | Levi Scott | Main role |
| 2019–2023 | Nancy Drew | Ryan Hudson | Main role |
| 2023 | Station 19 | CAPT Harris | Episode: "What Are You Willing to Lose" |

== Discography ==
=== Extended plays ===
List of extended plays with selected details
| Title | Details | Ref. |
|---|---|---|
| Riley Smith | Released: July 21, 2017; Format: digital download, streaming; Label: Worn Out Sole | |

=== Singles ===
List of singles as lead artist, showing year released and album name
| Title | Year | Album | Ref. |
|---|---|---|---|
| I'm on Fire | 2017 | Riley Smith | |
| Hang | 2018 | Non-album singles | |
| Bad at Goodbyes | 2018 | Non-album singles | |
| Just for Your Ears | 2018 | Non-album singles | |
| Radio | 2019 | Non-album singles | |
| Hard to Kiss | 2019 | Non-album singles | |
| Earthquake | 2019 | Non-album singles | |
| Chasing the Sun | 2019 | Non-album singles | |
| Chocolate | 2020 | Non-album singles | |

== Awards and nominations ==
- 2005: CAMIE Award for Radio – Won
