= The Year of Fury =

- Theatrical release poster
- Spanish: El año de la furia
- Directed by: Rafa Russo
- Screenplay by: Rafa Russo
- Produced by: Isabel G. Peralta; Juan Gona
- Starring: Alberto Ammann; Joaquín Furriel; Daniel Grao; Martina Gusman; Sara Sálamo; Maribel Verdú
- Cinematography: Daniel Aranyó
- Edited by: Marta Salas
- Music by: Claudia Bardagí
- Production companies: Gona; Aliwood Mediterráneo Producciones; Cimarrón
- Distributed by: Filmax (es)
- Release dates: October 2020 (Seminci); 28 May 2021 (Spain)
- Countries: Spain; Uruguay
- Language: Spanish

The Year of Fury (Spanish: El año de la furia) is a 2020 Spanish-Uruguayan drama film directed by Rafa Russo which stars Alberto Ammann, Joaquín Furriel, Daniel Grao, Martina Gusman, Sara Sálamo, and Maribel Verdú.

== Plot ==
Set in 1972 Montevideo, a year before the 1973 coup d'état, the plot tracks the lives of different people: television screenwriters Diego and Leonardo, military officer and torturer Rojas, prostitute Susana, anti-Francoist Spaniard and hostal owner Emilia, and the latter's daughter, political fighter Jenny.

== Cast ==
- Alberto Ammann as Diego
- Joaquín Furriel as Leonardo
- Daniel Grao as Rojas
- Martina Gusman as Susana
- Sara Sálamo as Jenny
- Maribel Verdú as Emilia
- Paula Cancio
- Miguel Ángel Solá

== Production ==
The film is a Spanish-Uruguayan co-production by Gona, Aliwood Mediterráneo Producciones and Cimarrón, with backing from Ibermedia, ICAA and RTVE. Footage was shot in Montevideo (outdoor scenes) and Madrid (indoor scenes).

== Release ==
The film was presented at the 65th Valladolid International Film Festival (Seminci) in October 2020. Distributed by Filmax, it was released theatrically in Spain on 28 May 2021.

== Reception ==
Javier Ocaña of El País deemed the film to be a "more than worthy approach to political cinema, with marked melodramatic overtones".

Alberto Luchini of El Mundo rated the film 3 out of 5 stars, highlighting its realistic characters, portrayed with multiple edges and without manichaeism, as the best thing about the film.

== See also ==
- List of Uruguayan films
- List of Spanish films of 2021
