= Jorge Román =

Argentine actor

- Born: Palo Santo, Formosa, Argentina
- Occupations: Film and television actor
- Known for: Cinema of Argentina
- Notable work: Autumn Sun

Jorge Román (born in Palo Santo, Formosa, Argentina) is a film and television actor. He works in the cinema of Argentina.

== Filmography ==
- Autumn Sun (1996)
- Ashes of Paradise (1997)
- Ángel, la Diva y Yo (1999)
- Merry Christmas (2000)
- El bonaerense (2002)
- Potrero (2004)
- La Mentira (2004)
- My Best Enemy (2005)
- Northeast (2005)
- Ulysses (2011)

== Television ==
- "Archivo Negro" (1997)
- "Trillizos!, dijo la partera" (1999)
- "Infieles" (2002)
- "Tiempo Final" (2004)
- "Padre Coraje" (2004) aka Brave Father John
- "Mujeres Asesinas" (2005)
- "Monzón" (2019)
