= Lion's Den (2008 film) =

2008 film

- Theatrical release poster
- Directed by: Pablo Trapero
- Screenplay by: Pablo Trapero; Martín Mauregui; Santiago Mitre; Alejandro Fadel
- Story by: Pablo Trapero
- Produced by: Pablo Trapero; Youngjoo Suh
- Starring: Martina Gusmán; Elli Medeiros; Rodrigo Santoro
- Cinematography: Guillermo Nieto
- Edited by: Ezequiel Borovinsky; Pablo Trapero
- Music by: Intoxicados; Chango Spasiuk; Los Palmeras
- Distributed by: Buena Vista International
- Release dates: May 15, 2008 (Cannes Film Festival); May 29, 2008 (Argentina)
- Running time: 113 minutes
- Countries: Argentina; South Korea; Brazil; Spain
- Language: Spanish

Lion's Den (Spanish: Leonera) is a 2008 drama film directed, co-written, co-produced and co-edited by Pablo Trapero. Addressing motherhood within the prison system, it stars Martina Gusmán, Elli Medeiros and Rodrigo Santoro. The film competed in the Competition at the 2008 Cannes Film Festival.

It was Argentina's official submission for the 2009 Academy Award for Best Foreign Language Film.

== Plot ==
In Buenos Aires, the independently minded student Julia Zárate awakens in her apartment with gore everywhere, her lover Nahuel stabbed, and their shared lover Ramiro covered with blood but alive.

Julia is pregnant and is sent to a special prison wing for mothers and pregnant prisoners to await trial. She befriends Marta, a fellow prisoner who has two children and helps her to understand prison life as a mother. Julia delivers Tomás and her mother tries to kidnap him, causing a prison riot. When Ramiro accuses her of murdering Nahuel, her chances of raising Tomás fall.

== Cast ==
- Martina Gusmán - Julia
- Elli Medeiros - Sofia
- Rodrigo Santoro - Ramiro
- Laura García - Marta
- Tomás Plotinsky - Tomás VI
- Leonardo Sauma - Ugo Casman

== See also ==
- List of submissions to the 81st Academy Awards for Best Foreign Language Film
- List of Argentine submissions for the Academy Award for Best Foreign Language Film
