= Get Away If You Can =

- Directed by: Dominique Braun; Terrence Martin
- Written by: Dominique Braun; Terrence Martin
- Starring: Dominique Braun; Terrence Martin; Riley Smith; Martina Gusmán; Ed Harris
- Release date: August 19, 2022
- Running time: 80 minutes
- Country: United States
- Language: English

Get Away If You Can is a 2022 mystery thriller drama film written and directed by Dominique Braun and Terrence Martin and starring Braun, Martin, Riley Smith, Martina Gusmán and Ed Harris.

== Cast ==
- Dominique Braun as Domi
- Terrence Martin as TJ
- Ed Harris as Alan
- Riley Smith as Graham
- Martina Gusmán as Mar

== Release ==
The film was released in select theaters and on VOD on August 19, 2022.

== Reception ==
The film has a 38% rating on Rotten Tomatoes based on 14 reviews. Alex Saveliev of Film Threat rated the film a 6 out of 10. Luke Y. Thompson of The A.V. Club graded the film a D. Glenn Kenny of RogerEbert.com awarded the film two stars.
