= Treehouse of Horror V =

- The Simpsons episode
- In "The Shinning", Homer goes insane over the lack of TV and beer.
- Episode no.: Season 6 Episode 6
- Directed by: Jim Reardon
- Written by: The Shinning: Bob Kushell; Time and Punishment: Greg Daniels; Dan McGrath; Nightmare Cafeteria: David X. Cohen
- Production code: 2F03
- Original air date: October 30, 1994

Guest appearances
- James Earl Jones as alternate timeline Maggie; Marcia Wallace as Edna Krabappel

Episode features
- Couch gag: The undead family members enter with disfigured bodies, and then swap heads and arms.
- Commentary: Matt Groening; David Mirkin; David X. Cohen; Greg Daniels; Jim Reardon

Episode chronology
← Previous "Sideshow Bob Roberts"	Next → "Bart's Girlfriend"
- The Simpsons season 6

"Treehouse of Horror V" is the sixth episode of the sixth season of the American animated television series The Simpsons, and the fifth entry in the Treehouse of Horror series. It originally aired on Fox in the United States on October 30, 1994, and features three short stories: "The Shinning", "Time and Punishment", and "Nightmare Cafeteria".

The episode was written by Greg Daniels, Dan McGrath, David Cohen and Bob Kushell, and directed by Jim Reardon. In "The Shinning", a spoof of The Shining, the Simpsons are hired as caretakers at Mr. Burns' mountain lodge. Deprived of television and beer, Homer goes insane and attempts to murder the family. In "Time and Punishment", a parody of Ray Bradbury's "A Sound of Thunder", Homer repeatedly travels back in time and alters the future. In "Nightmare Cafeteria", Principal Skinner begins using students in detention as cafeteria food. The episode has a running gag where Groundskeeper Willie tries to help but gets stabbed in the back with an axe, killing him. This is the first Treehouse of Horror episode not to feature a wraparound segment.

In response to longstanding complaints about excessive graphic violence in the show, showrunner David Mirkin mandated that the episode contain as many disturbing and gory elements as possible. James Earl Jones features as the voice of an alternate-timeline Maggie. The episode was critically acclaimed, with "The Shinning" segment receiving the most praise.

== Plot ==
Marge tells the audience that the episode is so scary that Congress will not allow its broadcast and instead presents the fictional "200 Miles to Oregon" starring Glenn Ford. Homer and Bart interrupt the transmission to show the episode anyway.

=== "The Shinning" ===
The Simpsons are employed as caretakers at Mr. Burns' mountain lodge while it is closed for the winter. Groundskeeper Willie discovers that Bart can read his mind, and tells him he has the "Shinning". Mr. Burns cuts off the lodge's cable TV and beer supplies to ensure hard work from the caretakers. The deprivation drives Homer insane (as Waylon Smithers said happened with the previous caretakers).

A phantom Moe Szyslak encourages Homer to kill his family. Marge finds Homer's manuscript, which reads "Feelin' fine"; lightning flashes, and she sees that Homer has scrawled "No TV and no beer make Homer go crazy" all over the walls. Homer attacks Marge and she fends him off; Homer frightens himself in a mirror and plummets down the stairs, knocking himself unconscious. Marge locks Homer in the pantry. Homer is temporarily distracted by the plentiful food there, but Moe forcibly drags him out. Bart uses his "Shinning" to summon Willie, who drops his portable TV in the snow to come to the family's rescue. Homer kills Willie with an axe and continues pursuing the family. Lisa shows Homer Willie's TV, and Homer's insanity abates as the family watches it. After they become frozen stiff, a performance of "One" from A Chorus Line at the Tony Awards ceremony begins on the TV, and Homer's murderous impulse starts to return.

=== "Time and Punishment" ===
Homer accidentally turns his broken toaster into a time machine after trying to repair it. After traveling to prehistoric times, Homer remembers his father's advice about the butterfly effect but unthinkingly swats a mosquito. He returns to a present where Ned Flanders is the "unquestioned lord and master of the world"; after Homer gets the Simpsons sentenced to 're-Neducation' (a program which includes full-frontal lobotomies), he escapes to the past in an effort to restore the original timeline.

Homer's failed attempts create a present where Bart and Lisa are giants, one where the Simpsons are wealthy and Patty and Selma have died, but no one knows what donuts are, and one where Willie is stabbed in the back with an axe by a talking Maggie. At last he returns to a present where he confirms from Marge that everything is back to normal. He sits down to dinner but sees that Marge, Bart, Lisa, and Maggie have reptilian tongues. Homer accepts this timeline as "close enough".

=== "Nightmare Cafeteria" ===
In this episode Principal Skinner and Lunchlady Doris are stymied by the problems of poor cafeteria food and an overcrowded detention hall. After Jimbo Jones trips Lunchlady Doris and gets food slop on him, Skinner realizes a mutual solution: cannibalizing any child that is sent to detention. Jimbo is killed and made into "Sloppy Jimbos".

The teachers all become addicted to the mix of food slop and human meat, compelling Skinner to send Üter to detention for cutting in line and turn him into "Üterbraten". Bart and Lisa realize this after Skinner unwittingly reveals the truth. They tell Marge, who refuses to help them because she wants them to stand up for themselves. With the other students either dead or imprisoned for fattening up before slaughter, Willie tries to help Bart, Lisa, and Milhouse escape, but Skinner stabs him in the back with an axe. Milhouse, Bart, and Lisa fall off a ledge into a giant food processor. Bart wakes up in his bedroom and realizes he was having a nightmare. Marge assures him he has nothing to fear except the "fog that turns people inside out", which seeps in through the window and turns the Simpson family inside out. The family, joined by Willie, perform "One" as the credits roll and Santa's Little Helper, excited by the exposed meat, drags Bart away.

== Production ==
Disappointed by complaints from United States Congress regarding the amount of violence in The Simpsons and their subsequent censorship attempts, showrunner David Mirkin attempted to put "as much blood and guts" into the episode as he could. He later called it "the most [...] disturbing Halloween show ever". The opening sequence, in which Marge states the episode could not be shown and plays some live-action stock footage, was also in reference to this. Mirkin said he thinks Halloween shows can be "scary as well as fun".

This episode marked the end of the tradition of featuring humorous tombstones in the title sequence of Halloween episodes. The title sequence featured a tombstone reading "Amusing Tombstones". The staff also abandoned the tradition of wraparound segments that were featured before each story in the preceding Halloween episodes, to allow more time for the main stories.

The first segment, "The Shinning", is a parody of The Shining (1980). Filmmaker Stanley Kubrick had been a big influence on Mirkin and was "one of the main reason[s] [he] wanted to be a director". Series creator Matt Groening admitted that he had not seen The Shining and most of the references to the film were entirely lost on him.

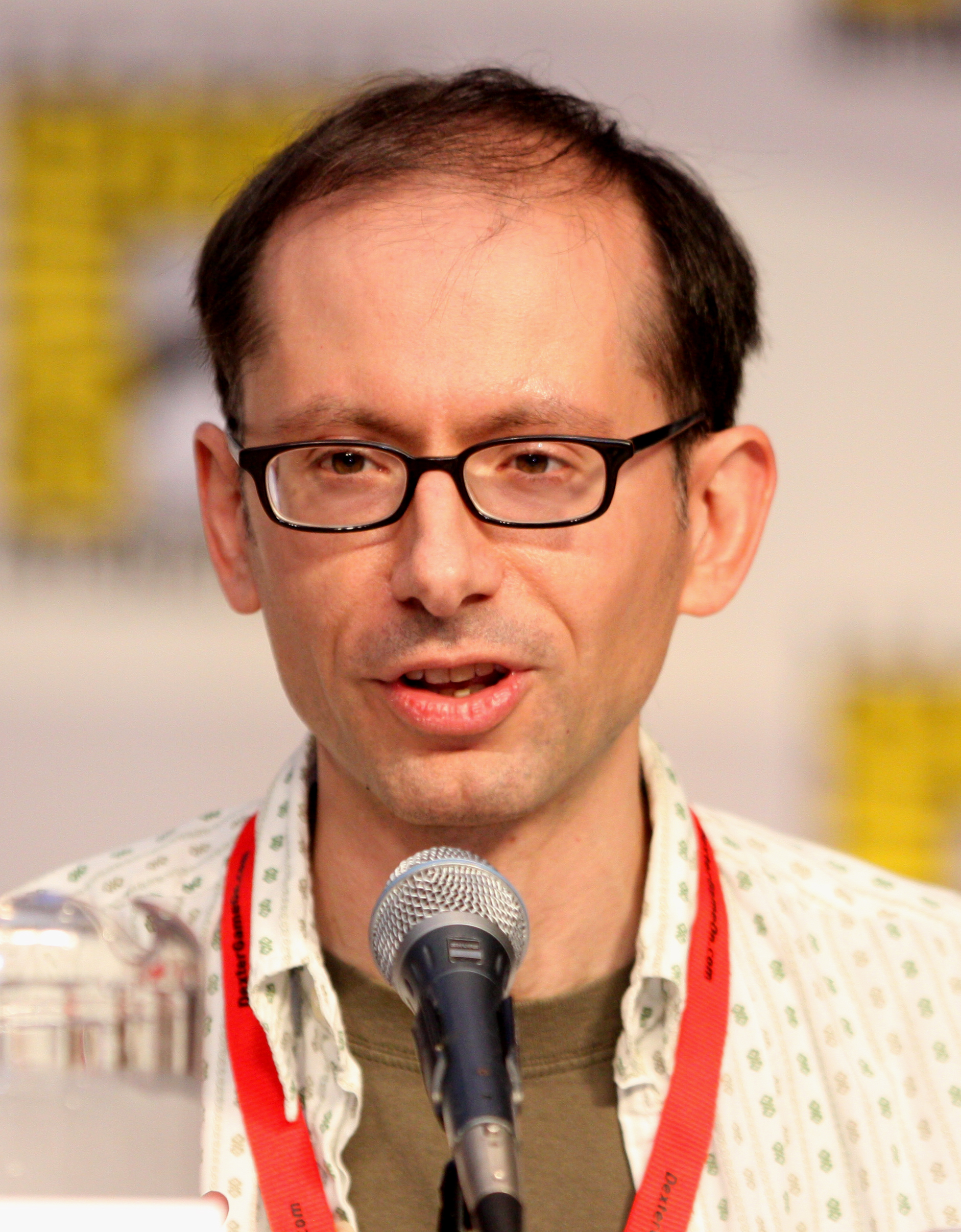
Nightmare Cafeteria marked David X. Cohen's debut as a The Simpsons writer.

Groening originally pitched the idea that Homer would travel through time in "Time and Punishment". His original idea was that the time-travel would be the result of Homer simply jamming his hand in the toaster, but this was rejected by the other writers. The first time Homer travels back in time, he was originally supposed to state "I'm the first non-fictional character to travel backwards through time". The line was later changed from "non-fictional" to "non-Brazilian". Groening was confused as to the reason for the change, since he liked the original so much. In fact, he did not even understand what the new line implied. Josh Weinstein said the line is supposed to be a non-sequitur. In Brazil, the Portuguese dub changes the line to "I'm the first non-astronaut to travel backwards through time". For one of the alternate realities created during the segment, Homer would have originally met a man named Roy living with his family, who would have been his teenage son in that reality. Roy would later be used in the eight season episode "The Itchy & Scratchy & Poochie Show" as a one-time character. In the sequence where the Simpsons' house transforms several times, one of the original designs included the house being made entirely of squirrels. Layout artist Lance Wilder worked on the drawings for more than two days, but were ultimately cut as the picture quality of standard-definition televisions of the time would have made the image unrecognizable. To ensure their work did not go to waste, some staff members have used the drawings on Christmas cards and other studio-related notices.

"Nightmare Cafeteria" was the first Simpsons story written by David X. Cohen. He wrote the final scene where a nightmarish fog turns the family inside out, inspired by an episode of the radio show Lights Out called "The Dark", which frightened Cohen as a child. A dance number was added immediately afterward in order to end the show on a lighter note. The "grade F meat" joke was written by Cohen, inspired by his cousin once seeing a box of hot dogs labeled "grade C, approved for human consumption".

== Cultural references ==
Marge says the following program is so scary Congress won't let them show it, and they'll instead air the "1947 classic Glenn Ford movie 200 Miles to Oregon." Homer and Bart's voice-over is a reference to the opening of The Outer Limits.

"The Shinning" is a parody of Stephen King's novel The Shining and Stanley Kubrick's 1980 film adaptation. The basic plot is the same and there are many references to specific scenes from the film, such as the blood coming out of the elevator and Homer breaking through a door with an axe and yelling "Here's Johnny!". After Marge puts Homer in the pantry, Moe and the ghouls, "concerned the project isn't moving forward", get him out. Among the ghouls are the Mummy, the Wolf Man, Count Dracula, Jason Voorhees, Pinhead and Freddy Krueger. Burns mentions the lodge was "the setting of satanic rituals, witch burnings, and five John Denver Christmas specials."

The title "Time and Punishment" is a reference to Fyodor Dostoyevsky's novel Crime and Punishment and the plot, where Homer causes major changes in the future by making small changes in the past, is a parody of Ray Bradbury's short story "A Sound of Thunder". Peabody and Sherman of The Rocky and Bullwinkle Show make an appearance during Homer's time traveling sequence and when, as a side effect of Homer's antics in the past, Kang and Kodos' heads are unexpectedly replaced with those of Peabody and Sherman. The dinosaur scenes are reminiscent of Jurassic Park, and the floor morphing into a television screen mirrors similar scenes in Terminator 2: Judgment Day and Time Bandits. Near the end of the segment, we see the Simpsons' house become an igloo, The Flintstones' house, a restaurant, submerged underwater, an old boot, a Bart Sphinx, and back.

The title "Nightmare Cafeteria" is a riff on the television series Nightmare Cafe, while the plot bears resemblance to Soylent Green. The closing song is a parody of "One" from the musical A Chorus Line, while the concept of the family being turned inside out by a mysterious fog comes from an episode of the radio show Lights Out, "The Dark". "One" can briefly be heard at the end of "The Shinning", when an announcer introduces the Tony Awards on Willie's portable TV.

== Reception ==
In its original broadcast, "Treehouse of Horror V" finished 27th in ratings for the week of October 24–30, 1994, with a Nielsen rating of 12.2, equivalent to approximately 11.6 million viewing households. It was the second highest-rated show on the Fox network that week, following Beverly Hills, 90210.

Since airing, "Treehouse of Horror V" has received critical acclaim. The authors of I Can't Believe It's a Bigger and Better Updated Unofficial Simpsons Guide, Gary Russell and Gareth Roberts, called it "Another fine entry to the Treehouse canon". Entertainment Weekly ranked this episode as the ninth best of the entire series: "The Shinning" was described as "a parody brimming with such detail [and] comic timing" that it "ranks with the greatest of pop culture spoofs" and Grandpa's wedding advice to Homer in "Time and Punishment" was praised as "one of the most beautifully random moments in Simpsons history". They concluded that "Maybe 'Nightmare Cafeteria' doesn't shine as brilliantly, but we still think it's perfectly, well, 'cromulent.'" It ranked fifth on AskMen.com's "Top 10: Simpsons Episodes" list. The list stated that the episode "offers three completely different tales, [...] boasting a potent combination of wit and humor" that, "the laughs never end", and that it "does a great job of incorporating Halloween-themed stories with the standard Simpsons charm". IGN called the episode "the funniest Treehouse of Horror to date". In 2006, they also named it the best episode of the sixth season. Adam Finley of the blog TV Squad called it "possibly one of the best Halloween episodes ever". Michael Passman of Michigan Daily said the episode "is largely regarded as the best, but a weak final third holds it back". Entertainment.ie named it among the 10 greatest Simpsons episodes of all time. Screen Rant called it the best episode of the sixth season and the greatest Halloween episode of The Simpsons. Consequence of Sound called it "a true benchmark of the series," ranking it the second greatest Treehouse of Horror episode of all time. In 2019, Time ranked the episode third in its list of 10 best Simpsons episodes picked by Simpsons experts.

"The Shinning" is particularly highly praised. IGN voted it first on their list of the best segments in the Treehouse of Horror series, with "Time and Punishment" coming fourth. It came ninth on the blog Noise to Signal's list of "The Ten Best Treehouse of Horror Vignettes". Adam Finley of TV Squad opined that it "could [...] be the best Treehouse of Horror segment ever" and praised the opening of "Time and Punishment." When putting together the perfect Treehouse of Horror episode, Passman of Michigan Daily included The Shinning as "a shoo-in". Empire named "No TV And No Beer Make Homer Go Crazy" the sixth-best film parody in the show's history. Vulture named "The Shinning" the best "Treehouse of Horror" segment ever, stating, "When you can’t think of the original without also thinking of the spoof. That’s The Shining and 'The Shinning,' easily the best Treehouse segment of all time."

James Earl Jones' guest appearance in this episode, as well as in "Treehouse of Horror" and "Das Bus", was listed seventh on IGN's "Top 25 Simpsons Guest Appearances" list. Jones ranked 25th on AOL's list of their favorite 25 The Simpsons guest stars. Matt Groening said that Maggie's line "It is indeed a disturbing universe" (voiced by Jones) is among his favorite lines in the show. David Mirkin said that Homer's line, "Oh I wish, I wish I hadn't killed that fish", is one of his favorites, and that the alternate future in which the family is rich "breaks [his] heart every time". Homer's line "close enough" from Time and Punishment was later used in the Stargate SG-1 episode "Moebius".

Alf Clausen's musical score for this episode received an Emmy Award nomination for "Outstanding Dramatic Underscore— Series" in 1995.

=== Legacy ===
"Time and Punishment" was later referenced in DC Comics' Booster Gold comic book series, where Booster Gold uses it to explain the butterfly effect. Simpsons-themed metal band Okilly Dokilly based their song "Reneducation" on "Time and Punishment", in which Homer visits a dystopian future where "Flanders is the unquestioned lord and master of the world."

== See also ==
- Butterfly effect in popular culture
- Cannibalism in popular culture
- Treehouse of Horror Episode
