= White Elephant (2012 film) =

2012 film

- Film poster
- Directed by: Pablo Trapero
- Written by: Pablo Trapero; Alejandro Fadel; Martín Mauregui; Santiago Mitre
- Produced by: Pablo Trapero
- Starring: Ricardo Darín; Jérémie Renier; Martina Gusman
- Cinematography: Guillermo Nieto
- Production companies: Patagonik Film Group; Buena Vista International
- Distributed by: Walt Disney Studios Motion Pictures (Argentina); Alta Films (Spain); Ad Vitam Distribution (France)
- Release dates: 21 May 2012 (Cannes); 24 May 2012 (Argentina)
- Running time: 120 minutes
- Countries: Argentina; Spain; France
- Language: Spanish

White Elephant (Spanish: Elefante blanco) is a 2012 crime drama film directed by Pablo Trapero. The film competed in the Un Certain Regard section at the 2012 Cannes Film Festival.

== Plot ==
Two priests, the old veteran Father Julián and his new younger Belgian colleague, Father Nicolás, and the social worker Luciana, work in a villa miseria in Buenos Aires, Argentina known as Ciudad Oculta (Hidden City). Together they fight to resolve the issues of the neighborhood's society. Their work will have them face the clerical hierarchy, the organized crime and the repression, risking their lives defending their commitment and loyalty towards the people of the neighbourhood.

The film's title comes from the gigantic abandoned hospital that dominates the area, described by Peter Bradshaw in The Guardian as, "a deserted wreck and cathedral of poverty known as the 'white elephant' where the homeless camp and drug-dealers ply their trade."

== Cast ==
- Ricardo Darín as Father Julián
- Jérémie Renier as Father Nicolas
- Martina Gusman as Luciana

== Release ==
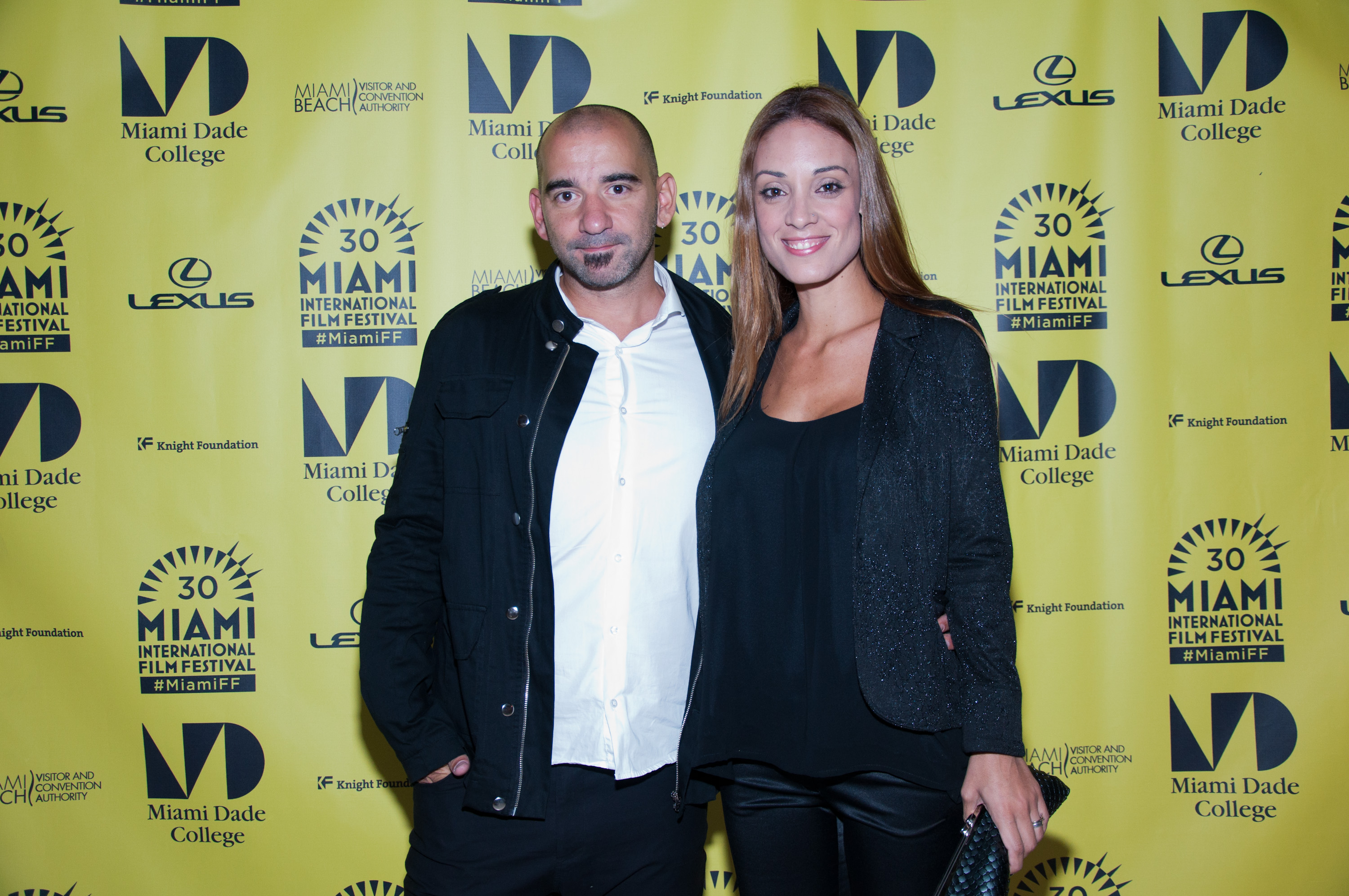
Director Pablo Trapero & Actress Martina Gusman at the 2013 Miami International Film Festival

After its premiere at the 2012 Cannes Film Festival on 21 May 2012, the film went on general release in Argentina three days later. It saw a very limited release (just 1 screen) in the United States on 29 March 2013, and a more general release in the United Kingdom on 26 April 2013.

The views of the British critics were mixed. Peter Bradshaw in The Guardian found it "a flawed drama, but one with emotional power", while Philip French in the sister paper The Observer found it to be a "hard-hitting tale of Catholic priests working in the slums of Argentina [which] thrills from start to finish", and Geoffrey Macnab in The Independent found it uneven: "The problem is the melodramatic and solemn screenplay. The action sequences have an energy reminiscent of City of God but the scenes in which the priests deal with housing problems or struggle with ill health or the temptations of the flesh soon begin to drag." Tim Robey in The Daily Telegraph was more enthusiastic, calling it a "potent drama about the lawless slums of Buenos Aires – it feels like The Mission with all exoticism firmly excised."
