= Carancho =

2010 film

- Argentine theatrical release poster
- Directed by: Pablo Trapero
- Written by: Alejandro Fadel; Martín Mauregui; Santiago Mitre; Pablo Trapero
- Produced by: Pablo Trapero; Martina Gusmán (executive producer)
- Starring: Ricardo Darín; Martina Gusmán
- Cinematography: Julián Apezteguia
- Edited by: Ezequiel Borovinsky; Pablo Trapero
- Production companies: Matanza Cine; Patagonik Film Group; Finecut; L90; Ad Vitam Production; INCAA; Programa Ibermedia
- Distributed by: Buena Vista International (Argentina); Ad Vitam Distribution (France); Golem Distribution (Spain)
- Release date: 6 May 2010
- Running time: 107 minutes
- Countries: Argentina; Chile; Spain; France; South Korea
- Language: Spanish

Carancho is a 2010 crime drama film directed by Pablo Trapero and starring Ricardo Darín and Martina Gusmán. A co-production between Argentina, Chile, Spain, France and South Korea, the film was entered into the Un Certain Regard section of the 2010 Cannes Film Festival. The film was selected as the Argentine entry for the Best Foreign Language Film at the 83rd Academy Awards, but it did not make the final shortlist.

== Plot synopsis ==
Sosa is a lawyer recently expelled from the bar association who works as an ambulance chaser —known as "carancho" in Argentina—, touring the emergency departments of the public hospitals and the police stations in search of potential clients for his barely-legal law firm. One night at a hospital he meets Luján, a young woman and doctor recently arrived from the provinces who is trying to get an internship as a surgeon. The two start a romantic relationship that is threatened when Sosa breaks his association with his corrupt boss. When Sosa is about to get back his attorney registration (and while making amends for his bad deeds) he and Luján are attacked by former partners of the law firm, initiating an escalation of violence.

== Cast ==
- Ricardo Darín as Héctor Sosa
- Martina Gusmán as Luján Olivera
- Carlos Weber as El Perro
- José Luis Arias as Casal
- Fabio Ronzano as Pico
- Loren Acuña as Mariana
- Gabriel Almirón as Muñoz
- José Manuel Espeche as Garrido

== Reception ==
On the review aggregator website Rotten Tomatoes, the film holds an approval rating of 88% based on 49 reviews, and an average rating of 6.8/10. On Metacritic, the film has a weighted average score of 66 out of 100, based on 15 critics, indicating "generally favorable reviews".

== See also ==
- List of submissions to the 83rd Academy Awards for Best Foreign Language Film
- List of Argentine submissions for the Academy Award for Best Foreign Language Film
