= El bonaerense =

2000 film by Pablo Trapero

- Theatrical release poster
- Directed by: Pablo Trapero
- Written by: Nicolas Gueilburt; Ricardo Ragendorfer; Dodi Shoeuer; Pablo Trapero; Daniel Valenzuela
- Produced by: Pablo Trapero
- Starring: Jorge Román; Mimí Ardú; Darío Levy
- Cinematography: Guillermo Nieto
- Edited by: Nicolás Goldbart
- Music by: Pablo Lescano
- Distributed by: Distribution Company Sudamericana (Argentina); Mars Distribution (France)
- Release dates: 21 May 2002 (France); 19 September 2002 (Argentina)
- Running time: 105 minutes
- Countries: Argentina; Chile; France; Netherlands
- Language: Spanish

El bonaerense is a 2002 drama film directed and produced by Pablo Trapero. The screenplay was a joint effort of Nicolas Gueilburt, Ricardo Ragendorfer, Dodi Shoeuer, Pablo Trapero, and actor Daniel Valenzuela, and partly funded by INCAA. It stars Jorge Román, Mimí Ardú, among others.

The movie deals with the corruption of the Bonaerense Police in the Buenos Aires Province, Argentina, and the lives of those involved in it.

== Plot ==
Zapa is a locksmith apprentice living a simple life in Corrientes with his family. After the locksmith Polaco breaks open a safe and uses him as a scapegoat, Zapa is convicted and sentenced to imprisonment in the Buenos Aires police jail, which is pictured as notoriously corrupt. This takes him to the La Matanza barrio in Greater Buenos Aires. Here, Zapa is taken in as the protégé of his superior Gallo and begins to climb the ladder of corruption. At the same time he has an affair with instructor Mabel. His journey through the political underworld as he frames and bribes ultimately takes him to the edge of innocence, and a final confrontation with Polaco.

== Cast ==
- Jorge Román as Zapa
- Mimí Ardú as Mabel
- Darío Levy as Gallo
- Víctor Hugo Carrizo as Molinari
- Hugo Anganuzzi as Polaco
- Graciana Chironi as Zapa's Mother
- Luis Viscat as Pellegrino
- Roberto Posse as Ismael
- Aníbal Barengo as Caneva
- Lucas Olivera as Abdala
- Gastón Polo as Lanza
- Jorge Luis Giménez as Berti

== Distribution ==
The film was first presented at the 2002 Cannes Film Festival on 21 May in the Un Certain Regard section. It opened in Argentina on 19 September 2002.

The picture was screened at various film festivals, including: the Karlovy Vary Film Festival, Czech Republic; the Toronto International Film Festival, Canada; the Chicago International Film Festival, United States; the Bergen International Film Festival, Norway; the Stockholm International Film, Sweden; and others.

== Reception ==
=== Critical response ===
New York Times film critic Stephen Holden lauded the film and wrote, "There are no crusading moralists to clean up the mess in El bonaerense, Pablo Trapero's grim, dispassionate drama of police corruption, set mostly in contemporary Buenos Aires. This powerful sweat-stained swatch of Argentine neo-realism, filmed in harsh high contrast that throws its characters' faces into deep shadow, follows the initiation of Zapa (Jorge Román), a naïve police recruit, into a labyrinth of sleaze...[the film] is all the more disturbing for refusing to act as an exposé. It just throws up its hands and says that this is the way it is. And its pointed detachment lends certain scenes an almost farcical sense of the absurd."

=== Awards ===
Wins

- Chicago International Film Festival: FIPRESCI Prize, Pablo Trapero; for the uncompromising and raw depiction of the journey of a man lost in a society without values; 2002.
- Guadalajara International Film Festival: Mayahuel Award, Best Film - Ibero-American Jury, Pablo Trapero; 2003.
- Lima Latin American Film Festival: Best Screenplay, Pablo Trapero; 2003.
- Lleida Latin-American Film Festival: Best Film, Pablo Trapero; 2003.
- Argentine Film Critics Association Awards: Silver Condor; Best Editing, Nicolas Goldbart; Best New Actress, Mimí Ardú; 2003.

Nominations

- Thessaloniki Film Festival: Golden Alexander, Pablo Trapero; 2002.
- Argentine Film Critics Association Awards: Silver Condor, Best Art Direction, Sebastián Roses; Best Cinematography, Guillermo Nieto; Best Director, Pablo Trapero; Best Film; Best New Actor, Jorge Román; Best Original Screenplay, Pablo Trapero; Best Sound, Catriel Vildosola; Best Supporting Actress, Mimí Ardú; 2003.
- Cartagena Film Festival: Golden India Catalina, Best Film, Pablo Trapero; 2004.
