= Rolling Family =

2004 film directed by Pablo Trapero

- Theatrical release poster
- Spanish: Familia rodante
- Directed by: Pablo Trapero
- Written by: Pablo Trapero
- Produced by: Executive Producers: Hugo Castro Fau; Martina Gusman
- Starring: Graciana Chironi
- Cinematography: Guillermo Nieto
- Edited by: Ezequiel Borovinsky; Nicolás Goldbart
- Music by: Hugo Diaz; León Gieco; Juaujo Soza
- Distributed by: Pol-Ka Producciones; Axiom Films (UK and Ireland)
- Release dates: 6 September 2004 (Italy); 30 September 2004 (Argentina)
- Running time: 103 minutes
- Countries: Argentina; Brazil; France; Germany; Spain; United Kingdom
- Language: Spanish

Rolling Family (Spanish: Familia rodante) is a 2004 comedy drama film, written and directed by Pablo Trapero, and produced by various countries, including Argentina. The film's executive producers were Hugo Castro Fau and Martina Gusman, and it was produced by Pablo Trapero, Robert Bevan, and Donald Ranvaud.

The picture is about a large Argentine family that takes a northern 1000 plus kilometre road trip in an old cramped motor-home to attend a wedding. The family takes part in many adventures along their way to the wedding.

== Plot ==
The comedy-drama tells the story of Emilia (Graciana Chironi) an 84-year-old grandmother who lives in the Buenos Aires suburbs and receives a phone call inviting her to be the matron of honour at her niece's wedding in Misiones, the village of her birth.

The Province of Misiones, where the village is located, is over 1000 kilometres away, on the Brazilian border in the farthest northeast part of Argentina.

Nevertheless, the large family decides to embark on a weekend long trip to take their grandmother to the wedding in a beat-up motor home.

While the members have feuds, intrigues, and love affairs on the journey, they, mostly, have to accept each other's quirks and faults and give each other a lot of space along the way as they encounter a few problems on their long road trip.

The film ends with Emilia in an introspective moment. She drinks her mate and appears to contemplate her family and life.

== Cast ==
- Graciana Chironi as Emilia, the grandmother and matriarch of the family.
- Bernardo Forteza as Oscar, the hot-head and overweight uncle married to Marta. He's in charge of the driving.
- Liliana Capurro as Marta, married to Oscar and spurns the advances made by Ernesto.
- Ruth Dobel as Claudia, a very emotional woman and married to Ernesto.
- Carlos Resta as Ernesto, who, although married, wants to revive a sexual relationship with Marta, his long ago girlfriend.
- Elias Viñoles as Gustavo, the kissing cousin of Yanina. He also lusts after her girlfriend Nadia.
- Marianela Pedano as Yanina, is a teenager in love with her cousin Gustavo and later hooks-up with a member of the wedding.
- Leila Gomez as Nadia, the girlfriend of Yanina. She lusts after Gustavo.
- Laura Glave as Paola, a young mother and in love with Claudio.
- Nicolás López as Matias, young boy about 8 or 9 years old and along for the ride.
- Federico Esquerro as Claudio, is irresponsible and in love with himself according to the film's trailer in English.

== Background ==
=== Casting ===
Pablo Trapero, in neo-realist fashion, used non-actors when he filmed.

The grandmother in the film (Graciana Chironi) is Trapero's actual grandmother. In fact, she's present in all of Trapero's films. She's seen by the director as the story's conscience.

=== Filming locations ===
The picture was filmed in Buenos Aires, Yapeyú, Corrientes and La Cruz, Corrientes; Argentina.

== Distribution ==
The film was first presented at the Venice Film Festival on 6 September 2004. Later in the month it made its North American debut at the Toronto International Film Festival on 16 September 2004.

It screened at various film festivals, including: the Rio de Janeiro International Film Festival, Brazil; the New York Film Festival, USA; the Chicago International Film Festival, USA; the Nantes Festival, France; the Seattle International Film Festival, USA; and others.

=== Release dates of production companies ===
- Argentina: 30 September 2004.
- Brazil: 9 December 2005.
- France: 1 December 2004.
- Germany: 23 February 2006.
- Spain: 4 March 2005.
- United Kingdom: 18 November 2005.

== Critical reception ==
Stephen Holden, film critic for The New York Times, liked the film and the direction of Pablo Trapero, and wrote, "Don't fret if you find it frustrating to unscramble the blood ties or follow the fragmented domestic dramas that jostle one another in Pablo Trapero's bighearted ensemble comedy...Without becoming intimate with any one person, you come to know them collectively."

Time Out film reviews wrote, "[I]t becomes clear we've seen a film of subtlety and wisdom, a shaggy-dog story about learning to deal with disappointment, compromise, confusion and loss: learning, in short, to survive life in all its painful truth and beauty."

Film critic Diego Lerer, a member of FIPRESCI, wrote an extensive essay on Pablo Trapero's cinema works. He said of the film, "The 'families' in Rolling Family are already morally 'corrupted.' It is never clearly spoken, but one of the reasons is obvious: they live in the capital. They have urbanised, diversified, and standardised themselves; they are no longer the safeguard against problems, but are now a part of them, and perhaps among the most serious ones...the characters are presented in a much crueler and hostile way, and the filmmaker does not just look at 'the others' with a dark gaze, but also at 'us'."

Critic Neil Young wrote, "Familia rodante nimbly dramatises the clash between old ways and new, making this a socially-conscious road movie with genuine texture and warmth...[the] [s]tar of the show is Chironi, very much front-and-centre as Emilia – the actress is actually Trapero's own grandmother, and as well as making some subtle points about family, maturity and the state of Argentina, it also works very well as a heartfelt, elaborately autobiographical tribute/farewell to a beloved relative."

== Awards ==
Wins

- Gijón International Film Festival, Spain: Best Actress, Graciana Chironi; Best Director, Pablo Trapero; 2004.
- Guadalajara Mexican Film Festival: FIPRESCI Prize, Pablo Trapero; 2005.
- Lima Latin American Film Festival, Peru: Best Actress, Liliana Capurro; 2005.

Nominations

- Gijón International Film Festival: Grand Prix Asturias, Best Feature, Pablo Trapero; 2004.
- Argentine Film Critics Association Awards: Silver Condor, Best New Actress, Graciana Chironi; 2005.
