= Butterfly effect in popular culture =

Examples of the butterfly effect

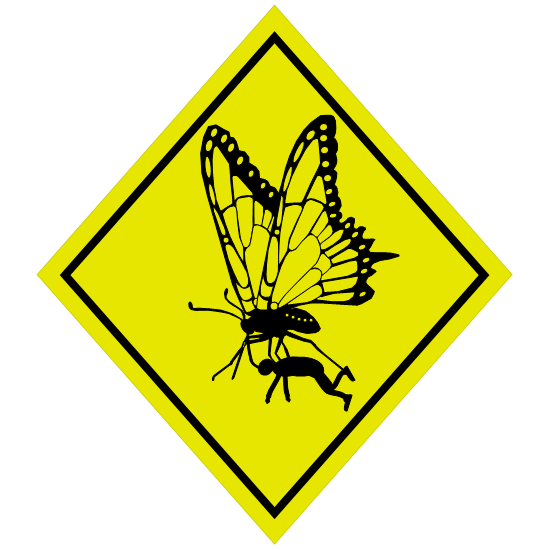
Butterfly effect image

The butterfly effect is a phenomenon in chaos theory whereby a minor change in circumstances can cause a large change in outcome. The scientific concept is attributed to Edward Lorenz, a mathematician and meteorologist who used the metaphor to describe his research findings related to chaos theory and weather prediction, initially in a 1972 paper titled "Predictability: Does the Flap of a Butterfly's Wings in Brazil Set Off a Tornado in Texas?" The butterfly metaphor is attributed to the 1952 Ray Bradbury short story "A Sound of Thunder".

The concept has been widely adopted by popular culture, and interpreted to mean that small events have a rippling effect that cause much larger events to occur, and has become a common reference.

== Examples ==
=== "A Sound of Thunder" ===
The 1952 short story "A Sound of Thunder" by Ray Bradbury explores the concept of how the death of a butterfly in the past could have drastic changes in the future, and has been used as an example of "the butterfly effect" and how to consider chaos theory and the physics of time travel. The story has since been made into a film of the same name and an episode of the television series Ray Bradbury Theater.

=== Films ===
The influence of the concept can be seen in the films The Terminator, Back to the Future, X-Men: Days of Future Past, Dasavathaaram, Maheshinte Prathikaram and Cloud Atlas.

In the 1990 film Havana, the character played by Robert Redford states, "A butterfly can flutter its wings over a flower in China and cause a hurricane in the Caribbean", and scientists "can even calculate the odds". According to science journalist Peter Dizikes, the films Havana and The Butterfly Effect mischaracterize the butterfly effect by asserting the effect can be calculated with certainty, because this is the opposite of its scientific meaning in chaos theory as it relates to the unpredictability of certain physical systems; Dizikes writes in 2008, "The larger meaning of the butterfly effect is not that we can readily track such connections, but that we can't."

In the 1993 movie Jurassic Park, Dr. Ian Malcolm (played by Jeff Goldblum) attempts to explain chaos theory to Dr. Ellie Sattler (played by Laura Dern), specifically referencing the butterfly effect, by stating "It simply deals with unpredictability in complex systems", and "The shorthand is 'the butterfly effect.' A butterfly can flap its wings in Peking, and in Central Park, you get rain instead of sunshine."

Other examples include Terry Pratchett's novel Interesting Times, which tells of the magical "Quantum Weather Butterfly" with the ability to manipulate weather patterns. The 2009 film Mr. Nobody incorporates the butterfly effect and the concept of smaller events that result in larger changes altering a person's life.

The 2020 - 2021 miniseries of short films Explaining the Pandemic to my Past Self by Julie Nolke incorporates the butterfly effect as a limitation on how much she can explain to her past self.

The 2021 film Needle in a Timestack is described in a review by The Guardian as having a plot where the character played by Leslie Odom Jr. "sets off a calamitous butterfly effect that results in, not the survival of dinosaurs, not a deadly plague, not an Allied loss of the second world war, but him being married to Freida Pinto instead of Cynthia Erivo."

=== Television ===
The concept is referenced in a Treehouse of Horror episode of the television series The Simpsons.

"My Butterfly", an episode from the TV show Scrubs, features two separate timelines, each influenced by the butterfly effect. The season four premiere episodes of Ugly Betty are named "The Butterfly Effect Part 1" and "The Butterfly Effect Part 2", and a review of the episodes in Vulture states, "Ugly Betty is certainly invested in the physics of the Butterfly Effect, too: One small change can indeed cause large-scale effects."

The miniseries Black Bird (2022) begins with a narration about the butterfly effect.

=== Video games ===
The concept is also incorporated into video games, including Eve Online. The 2015 video game Until Dawn features the butterfly effect as a central plot point, using the concept to describe how player choices can drastically affect the outcome of events. The video game series Life Is Strange, first released in 2015, makes multiple references to the butterfly effect and uses it to describe how player choices affect the plot of the game.

=== Books ===
The 2020 biography of Kendrick Lamar, The Butterfly Effect: How Kendrick Lamar Ignited the Soul of Black America by Marcus J. Moore, chronicles "what if" moments during Lamar's life and developing career, including what happened after the release of To Pimp a Butterfly.

The 2020 book The Butterfly Effect: Insects and the Making of the Modern World by Edward Melillo incorporates the concept to discuss the influence of insects.

=== Other popular culture ===
During the COVID-19 pandemic, doctor and journalist Peter Endicott used the butterfly effect to describe the impact of increased waiting times within the health care system in the UK, i.e. "The knock-on effect this would have on my day – the beating of a butterfly's wings in the morning causing tornadoes by the afternoon." The butterfly effect was also used as a justification for the suppression of news in China about the death of Li Wenliang.

== See also ==
- Alternate history
- Time travel in fiction
- List of time travel works of fiction
