= Pablo Trapero =

Argentine film director, screenwriter and producer

- Trapero in 2026
- Born: 4 October 1971 (age 54); San Justo, Buenos Aires, Argentina
- Occupations: Film producer, film editor, film director

Pablo Trapero (born 4 October 1971) is an Argentine film producer, editor, and director.

== Biography ==
Pablo Trapero was born in San Justo, Argentina in 1971. In 1999 he directed his first feature, Mundo Grúa, which won the Critics Prize at Venice.

In 2002, he opened his production company, Matanza Cine, that produces films for fellow filmmakers, as well as his own. His second feature, El Bonaerense (2002) premiered at Cannes, Familia Rodante (2004) at Venice, and Nacido y Criado (2006) at Toronto.

In 2008, Leonera, presented in Competition at Cannes, showcased the talent of Martina Gusman, muse, actress and producer of the cineaste. He returned to Cannes with Carancho (2010) and Elefante Blanco (2012), both in Un Certain Regard. His films have been covered in some of the most important festivals, receiving critical acclaim and awards.

He has sat on the main festival juries at Venice, San Sebastian and Locarno, among others. In 2014 he served as President of Un Certain Regard in Cannes. In 2015 the Ministry of Culture of France awarded him Chevallier l'Ordre des Arts et des Lettres; he was the first South American director to receive the honor.

With his film, The Clan, he won the Silver Lion for Best Director in Venice International Film Festival.

== Filmography ==
Director, Scriptwriter and Producer

- Mundo Grúa (1999)
- El Bonaerense (2002)
- Familia Rodante (2004)
- Nacido y Criado (2006)
- Leonera (2008), released in the U.S. as Lion's Den
- Carancho (2010)
- White Elephant (2012)
- The Clan (2015)
- La Quietud (2018)

Director Only

- Mocoso malcriado (1993)
- Negocios (1995)
- Naikor, La Estación de Servicio (2001)
- & Sons (2025)

Producer Only

- La Libertad (2001)
- La Mecha (2003)
- Ciudad de María (2002)
- Mi Mejor Enemigo (2005)
- Dí Buen Día a Papá (2005)
- Géminis (2005)

== Television ==
- Ensayo (2003) - TV series
- ZeroZeroZero (2020) - TV series
- Echo 3 (2023) - TV series
