= Silver Condor Award for Best Supporting Actress =

Annual Argentine film award

The Silver Condor Award for Best Supporting Actress (Spanish: Premio Cóndor de Plata a la mejor actriz de reparto), given by the Argentine Film Critics Association, awards the best supporting actress in Argentina each year:

Year	Actress	Film
2024	Rita Cortese	Blondi; Most People Die on Sundays
2023	Laura Paredes	Argentina, 1985
2022	Mónica Lairana	Karnawal
2021	Susana Pampín	La muerte no existe y el amor tampoco
2020	Jazmín Stuart	Las buenas intenciones
2019	Graciela Borges	La quietud
2018	Marilú Marini; Érica Rivas	Los que aman, odian La cordillera
2017	Susana Pampín	La luz incidente
2016	Mónica Lairana	El patrón: radiografía de un crimen
2015	Érica Rivas	Relatos salvajes
2014	Victoria Carreras	Puerta de Hierro, el exilio de Perón
2013	Cristina Banegas	Infancia clandestina
2012	Verónica Llinás	Cerro Bayo
2011	Ana Celentano	El mural
2010	Gabriela Toscano	Las viudas de los jueves
2009	Malena Solda	Cordero de Dios
2008	Betiana Blum; Mirta Busnelli	Tocar el cielo Las mantenidas sin sueños
2007	Evangelina Salazar	Monobloc
2006	Virginia Innocenti	Iluminados por el fuego
2005	Adriana Aizemberg	El abrazo partido
2004	Beatriz Thibaudin	Tan de repente
2003	Julieta Díaz	Herencia
2002	Norma Aleandro	El hijo de la novia
2001	Elsa Berenguer	Nueve reinas
2000	Adriana Aizemberg	Mundo grúa
1998	Leticia Brédice	Cenizas del paraíso
1997	Olga Zubarry	Plaza de almas
1997	Norma Pons	Sotto voce
1996	Leonor Manso	Patrón
1995	Alicia Bruzzo	Una sombra ya pronto serás
1994	Juana Hidalgo	El caso María Soledad
1993	Luisina Brando	Dónde estás amor de mi vida...
1992	Leonor Manso	La última siembra
1991	Cecilia Rosetto	Flop
1990	María Fiorentino	La ciudad oculta
1988	Graciela Dufau	Sofía
1986	Chela Ruiz	La historia oficial
1985	China Zorrilla	Darse cuenta
1983	Elena Tasisto	Últimos días de la víctima
1982	Graciela Dufau	Queridas amigas
1972	Perla Santalla	Juguemos en el mundo
1971	Marilina Ross	Los herederos
1970	Nora Cullen	El dependiente
1968	María Luisa Robledo	Noche terrible
1967	Susana Campos	Del brazo y por la calle
1966	Beatriz Matar; María Antonia Tejedor	Pajarito Gómez; La pérgola de las flores
1964	Bárbara Mujica	Las ratas
1963	Milagros de la Vega	La cifra impar
1962	María Rosa Gallo	La mano en la trampa
1961	Aída Luz	Las furias Sábado a la noche, cine
1960	Lydia Lamaison; Iris Marga	La caída El candidato
1959	María Luisa Robledo	Rosaura a las diez
1956	Alba Mujica	Para vestir santos
1955	Julia Sandoval; Elsa Daniel	Guacho; El abuelo
1954	Nelly Panizza	Mercado negro
1953	Ilde Pirovano	No abras nunca esa puerta
1952	Zoe Ducós	Suburbio
1951	Diana Maggi	Nacha Regules
1946	Judith Sulian	Se abre el abismo
1945	Elsa O'Connor	El deseo
1944	Leticia Scury	Tres hombres del río
