= Diana Frey =

Argentine film producer

Diana Frey (born August 16, 1944) is an Argentine film producer and production manager active in the Cinema of Argentina since 1976.

She has produced a number of significant Argentine pictures such as Alambrado (1991), Plata quemada (2000) and El Fondo del mar (2003).

== Filmography ==
- Juan que reía - 1976
- La República perdida - 1983
- State of Reality (Darse cuenta) - 1984
- Waiting for the Hearse (Esperando la carroza) - 1985
- Sofía - 1987
- I Don't Owe 100 Times (Cien veces no debo) - 1990
- Barbed Wire (Alambrado) - 1991
- Burnt Money (Plata quemada) - 2000
- Three Wives (Tre mogli) - 2001
- Bottom of the Sea (El Fondo del Mar) - 2003
- Paco Urondo, la palabra justa - 2005
- Nuovomondo - 2006
- Resurrectores - 2007
- Maradona, the Hand of God (Maradona, la mano di Dio) - 2007

== Television ==
- ¿Donde queda el paraíso? (1993) (TV producer)
- Locos de contento (1993) (TV producer)
- ''Dulce Ana (1995) (TV Series executive producer)
- Amor sagrado (1996) (TV Series executive producer)
