= Duilio Marzio =

Argentine cinema and theatre actor

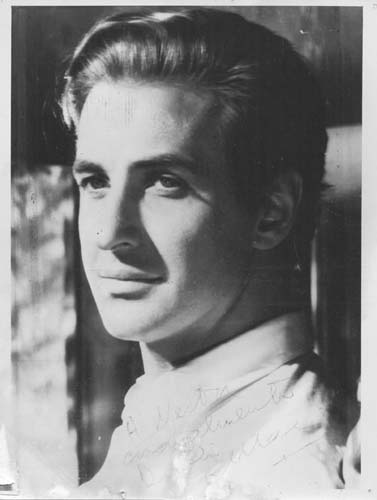
- Born: Duilio Bruno Perruccio La Stella; November 27, 1923; Buenos Aires, Argentina
- Died: July 25, 2013 (aged 89); Buenos Aires
- Education: University of Buenos Aires

Duilio Marzio (November 27, 1923 – July 25, 2013) was a well-known Argentine cinema and theatre actor.

== Life and work ==
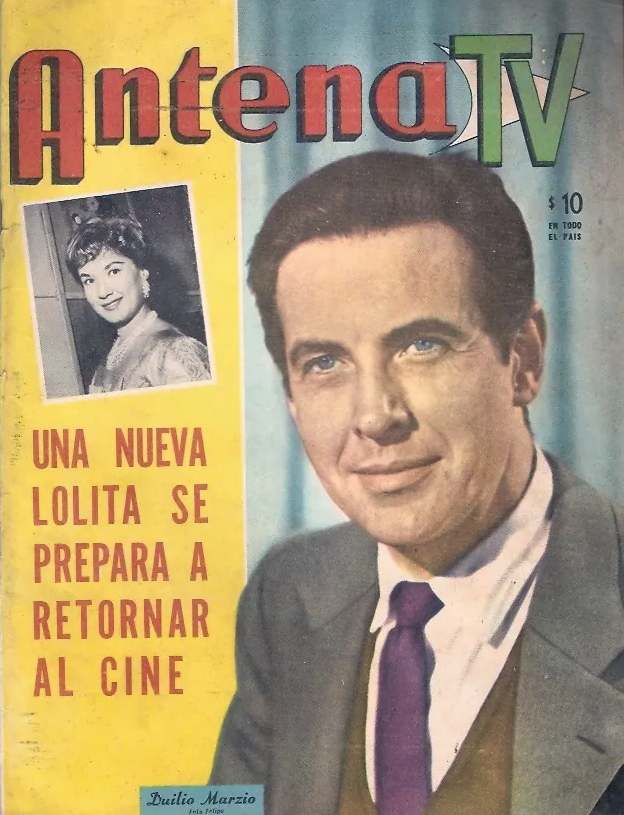
Duilio Marzio (1962)

Marzio was born Duilio Bruno Perruccio La Stella in Buenos Aires to Sicilian immigrants, in 1923. He enrolled at the University of Buenos Aires Law School, obtaining a juris doctor. Shortly afterwards, however, his interest in the theatre lured him away from his post in a local law firm, and he first starred on the stage in 1949 opposite Paulina Singerman in Antonio Cunill Cabanellas' Fin de semana (Weekend).

His friendship with actor Pepe Soriano helped persuade him to continue acting, against his father's wishes. He starred with Soriano in numerous plays from 1951 on and in 1953, he was offered his first film role. The starring role opposite Diana Maggi in period piece film maker Leopoldo Torre Nilsson's La tigra (The Tigress) led to frequent subsequent roles, both leading and secondary. He worked for Torre Nilsson again in 1959, starring in La caída (The Fall).

These roles in film and theatre earned Marzio a fellowship to Lee Strasberg's prestigious New York City drama school, the Actors Studio, in 1960. Marzio was a guest in Strasberg's apartment during his two-year stay in New York, and was the only Argentine actor so honored by the iconic method acting instructor. His memorable stay in the United States included Strasberg's lending him a car with which he traveled to California.

He returned to star in Ralph Pappier's Operación G and Fernando Ayala'a Paula cautiva with Susana Freyre, a regular co-star of his in the theatre. He was cast as himself in 1964 for Daniel Tinayre's adaptation of French author Guy des Cars' Cette étrange tendresse (Strange Tenderness). Aside from a cameo, however, he then left the cinema until 1974, when he led the cast in Bernardo Arias' El fuego del pecado. A dearth in Argentine film production during the dictatorship installed in 1976, helped lead to another long hiatus from cinema, and Marzio worked both in the theatre and television.

Marzio returned to film in Raúl de la Torre 1986 period piece, Pobre mariposa (Poor Butterfly), and starred with American actor Don Stroud in a 1988 U.S.-Argentine production, Two to Tango. A 1992 adaptation of Albert Camus's The Plague (directed by Luis Puenzo) also included the steely-eyed Marzio, and also worked with French actress Dominique Sanda and Federico Luppi in Edgardo Cozarinsky's Guerriers et captives (Warriors and Prisoners).

His role as writer Jorge Luis Borges in Enrique Estrazulas' historical play Borges y Perón earned Marzio his first ACE Award in 1998. In Pablo Parés' gothic Jennifer's Shadow (2004), Marzio was cast as the concerned mystic, "Darío Bardevil," and starred with Faye Dunaway. Alejandro Doria directed Marzio in the 2006 historical drama, Las manos (The Hands) and musician/filmmaker Fito Páez cast him as the dictator in his satirical ¿De quién es el portaligas? (Whose Belt is This?). He continued to work in the theatre well into his eighties, notably in a 2009 stage adaptation of Hungarian writer Sándor Márai's The Last Encounter, for which he earned a second ACE Award.

Marzio, whose several lengthy relationships never led to marriage, was fond of a line in Federico Fellini's La strada: "Every stone in life has its reason for being there." He underwent coronary bypass surgery in June 2013, but did not ultimately recover. The noted film and stage actor died in Buenos Aires a month later at age 89; he was interred in Chacarita Cemetery.

== Partial filmography ==
- Días de odio (1954) - The Young
- La tigra (1954) - Luis
- Sinfonía de juventud (1955)
- El amor nunca muere (1955)
- La Tierra del Fuego se apaga (1955)
- El curandero (1955)
- Ayer fue primavera (1955)
- Marta Ferrari (1956)
- Surcos en el mar (1956)
- Edad difícil (1956)
- Operación Antartida (1957)
- Todo sea para bien (1957)
- El jefe (1958)
- En la ardiente oscuridad (1958)
- La caída (1959) - José María
- The Candidate (1959)
- Un Guapo del '900 (1960) - Clemente Ordóñez
- Sábado a la noche, cine (1960)
- Plaza Huincul (Pozo Uno) (1960)
- A puerta cerrada (1962)
- Operación G (1962)
- Primero yo (1964)
- Paula cautiva (1964) - Sutton
- Extraña ternura (1964) - Himself
- The Revenge of Ivanhoe (1965) - Cedric of Hastings
- Turismo de carretera (1968)
- El inquisidor (1975) - Dr. Carlos Herrera
- La Raulito (1975) - Doctor
- Pobre mariposa (1986)
- Two to Tango (1989) - Paulino Velasco
- Guerriers et captives (1990) - Master Pacheco / Maître Pacheco
- The Plague (1992) - Judge Orbon
- Tres pájaros (2002) - Gregorio Rellán
- Jennifer's Shadow (2004) - Darío Baredevil
- Las manos (2006) - Monseñor Alessandri
- ¿De quién es el portaligas? (2007) - Comodoro
- Silencios (2009) - Padre de Inés
- Horizontal/Vertical (2009) - Aldo
- La Cacería (2012) - Federico Kappler (final film role)
