= Dora Baret =

Argentine actress

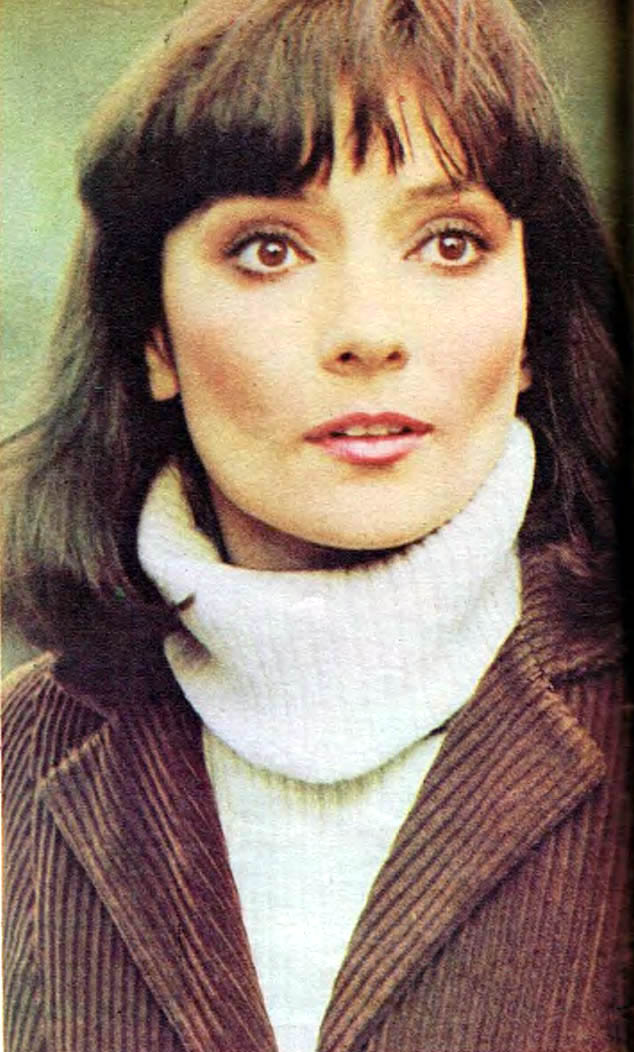
- Baret in 1975
- Born: July 7, 1940 (age 86); Huerta Grande, Córdoba Province, Argentina
- Occupation: Actress

Dora Baret (born July 7, 1940) is an Argentine film, theatre and television actress. She was the female lead in Darse cuenta which won the 1984 Silver Condor Award for Best Film.

== Life and work ==
She was born Dora Barrera in 1940 in Huerta Grande, a scenic Córdoba Province town near La Falda. Her parents, Spanish immigrants, relocated to the Floresta section of Buenos Aires when she was six, and she began attending acting school at age 14. She was a talented amateur tango dancer in her teens, and performed for bandleaders Francisco Canaro, Juan d'Arienzo and Osvaldo Pugliese, among others.

Known by then as Dora Baret, she first worked in film as an extra in La venenosa, and was offered her first film role in Hugo del Carril's 1958 drama, Una cita con la vida (A Rendezvous with Life); that year, she met her future husband, Carlos Gandolfo. Numerous other film and theatre roles followed and in 1963, she debuted on Argentine television, given a supporting role in Narciso Ibáñez Menta's thriller series, El sátiro.

She was given an important role by period-piece master Leopoldo Torre Nilsson in his La terraza (1963), later working with directors Alejandro Doria and Alberto Migré in a number of television series. Later leading roles included those in Manuel Antín's Allá lejos y hace tiempo (Long Ago and Far Away, 1978), Carlos Orgambide's Queridas amigas (Dear Friends, 1980) and Javier Torre's historical Fiebre amarilla (Yellow Fever, 1981). Baret was reunited with director Alejandro Doria for his award-winning tragedy Darse cuenta (Realization, 1984) and in the title role of his 1987 drama set at the height of the Dirty War, Sofía. More recent, notable roles include ones in Eduardo Mignogna's 1990 bio-pic of ill-fated comedian Florencio Parravicini, Flop, and in Pablo Bardauil's existential Chile 672 (2006).

A longtime smoker, Dora Baret was diagnosed with breast cancer in 2003, and lost her husband of 55 years, fellow actor Carlos Gandolfo, in 2005. She battled her cancer successfully, however, and today directs a drama school. Baret continued to work in the theatre, and in 2007, earned a Latin ACE Award for her starring role in Luz de gas (Gas Lamp). Her two sons are also show business personalities: Matías Gandolfo became an actor, and another son is known to Argentine audiences as Emanuel the Magician.
