= Gandolfo =

Gandolfo is a surname. Notable people with the surname include:

- Antonino Gandolfo (1841–1910), Italian painter
- Carlos Gandolfo (1931–2005), Argentine actor and theatre director
- Emanuel Gandolfo (born 1968), Argentine stage magician
- Giancarlo Gandolfo (born 1937), Italian economist
- Jarett Gandolfo, American politician
- Mike Gandolfo (born 1958), American tennis player

== See also ==
- Castel Gandolfo, a town in the Italian region of Lazio
- Gundulf
