= Diary of a Pig War =

- Directed by: Leopoldo Torre Nilsson
- Written by: Leopoldo Torre Nilsson; Beatriz Guido; Luis Pico Estrada
- Music by: Gato Barbieri
- Release date: 1975
- Country: Argentina
- Language: Spanish

Diary of a Pig War (Spanish: La Guerra del cerdo) is a 1975 Argentinian film directed by Leopoldo Torre Nilsson about his own script written in collaboration with Beatriz Guido and Luis Pico Estrada. It is based on the novel "Diario de la guerra del cerdo" by Adolfo Bioy Casares. It stars José Slavin, Marta González, Edgardo Suárez, Víctor Laplace and Emilio Alfaro. It was released on 7 August, 1975. Excerpts of the short film The Last Cry (1960) by Dino Minitti are seen during the film.

== Plot ==
In an alternative reality, a man who is entering old age faces a society in which the young eliminate the old.

== Cast ==
- José Slavin …Isidro Vidal
- Marta González …Nélida
- Edgardo Suárez … Antonio Bobliolo
- Víctor Laplace … Isidorito Vidal
- Emilio Alfaro … Farrell
- Osvaldo Terranova … Leandro Rey
- Miguel Ligero... Jimmy Neuman
- Luis Politti
- Zelmar Gueñol
- María José Demare
- Héctor Tealdi
- Adriana Parets
- Raquel María Álvarez
- Walter Soubrié
- Marta Cipriano
- Fernando Tacholas Iglesias
- Luis Cordara
- Cristina Aramburu
- Matilde Mur
- Augusto Larreta
- Juan Carlos Gianuzzi
- Alberto Salgado
- Inés Murray
- Marcelo Alfaro
- Julio César Acera
- Franco Balestrieri
- Alberto Fernández de Rosa
- Cecilia Cenci
