= Cecilia Cenci =

Argentine actress (1942–2014)

Cecilia Cenci (3 August 1942 – 21 September 2014) was an Argentine film, stage and television actress. She was born in La Plata.

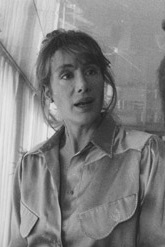
Cenci in 1988

== Career ==
Cecilia Cenci studied dramatic art at the School of Theatre in La Plata, participating in the mid-1960s in the old Channel 7 in the show Guide for Parents. On the big screen, she made her debut with the film The Pig War (1975) with José Slavin, and Marta González. However, it was in the 1980s when Cenci reached her career climax. She worked on several films until 1993 when she played the character of Eva Peron in the film Gatica, el Mono, directed by Leonardo Favio. On the small screen she was showcased in various comedian and melodramatic roles. In 1980 she won a starring role opposite Germán Kraus in the telenovelas Rosas para su enamorada and Donde pueda quererte. In Chile she starred as the wife in Andrea, Justicia de Mujer (1984). She appeared in several soap operas with international projection in antagonistic roles as in María de nadie, with Grecia Colmenares and Jorge Martinez and the telenovela Mujer comprada, with Mayra Alejandra and Arturo Puig. One of her most notable roles was that of Felicia del Molino López de Espada in the telenovela Nano (1994), with Araceli González . Her last television appearance was playing another villainous character, but this time with a humorous touch, in the soap opera Por Amor a Vos starring Miguel Angel Rodriguez and Claribel Medina.

She also did a notable union work and served as president of the Argentina Actors Association during 2008–2011. She was also president of the Social Work Actors from December 2006 until March 2014.

She died at dawn on 21 September 2014, at age 72 of brain cancer. She died at the Fundación Favaloro Hospital in Buenos Aires and was buried in the cemetery of the Argentina Actors Association of the Chacarita Cemetery.

== Filmography ==
- 1975: Diary of a Pig War
- 1976: El gordo de América (The Fat Man of America)
- 1976: Piedra libre
- 1977: El productor de espectáculos (The show producer)
- 1979: Contragolpe
- 1979: Las Muñecas que hacen ¡pum!
- 1981: Mientras me dure la vida (While life lasts me)
- 1982: La casa de las siete tumbas (The house of the seven tombs)
- 1988: Gracias por los servicios (Thanks for the services)
- 1993: Gatica, el mono, playing Evita

== Television ==
- 1980: Dónde pueda quererte (Where I can love you)
- 1980: Un ángel en la ciudad (An angel in the city) as Sandra
- 1980: Rosas para su enamorada (Roses for your love)
- 1980: El Rafa
- 1981: Barracas al sur (Barracas to the south)
- 1981: El ciclo de Guillermo Bredeston y Nora Cárpena (The cycle of Guillermo Bredeston and Nora Cárpena)
- 1981/1982: Aprender a vivir (Learning to Live)
- 1982: El oriental (The Easterner)
- 1982/1983: Todos los días la misma historia (Every day the same story)
- 1984: Andrea, justicia de mujer (Andrea, Women's Justice) as Andrea
- 1985: María de nadie (Mary of nobody) as Ivana
- 1986: Mujer comprada (Purchased Woman) as Laura Simonal
- 1987: Estrellita mine as Cristina
- 1988/1989: De carne somos (We're made of meat)
- 1989: Así son los míos (Mine are like this)
- 1989: Las comedias de Darío Vittori (The comedies of Dario Vittori) (episode "La nena se nos va")
- 1991: Buenos Aires, háblame de amor (Buenos Aires, talk to me about love) as Mercedes
- 1991: Inolvidable (Unforgettable) as Dr. Gutiérrez
- 1994: Nano as Felicia del Molino López de Espada
- 1997: Amor sagrado (Sacred Love) as Mercedes
- 1997: Mía solo mía (Mine, only mine) as Angelina Zamorano
- 2008: Por amor a vos (For loving you) as Elvira Batani Molinari

== Theatre ==
- 1979: Convivencia (Coexistence) directed by Roberto Duran in Regina Theatre
- El ombligo (The Navel)
- Arsenic and Old Lace
- Los árboles mueren de pie (Trees die standing)
- 1993: Qué noche de casamiento (What a night of marriage) by Ivo Pelay
- Cariñosamente Evita (Affectionately Evita)
- La fuerza de la naturaleza (The force of nature)
- Amor al aire libre (Love the outdoors)
- Des-plazados (Dis-placed)
- Domador de tormentas (Storms' Tamer)
- Tute Cabrero
- 2009: Las González
- 2013: De sobornar el olvido (To bribe the oblivion)
