= Eva Bourke =

Irish poet

Eva Bourke (born 1946) is a German-born Irish poet.

== Biography ==
Bourke was born in Germany but has lived for much of her life in Galway, Ireland. She studied German Literature and History of Art at LMU Munich. Towards the end of the seventies, she moved with her husband Eoin Bourke and her three children to Galway in the West of Ireland, where Eoin held the position of professor of German Literature at the National University of Ireland, Galway. She has lived in Galway since, where she taught at the University of Galway.

Bourke writes in English and has had seven collections of poetry published. Her translations of Irish poets into German appeared among others in the journals Die Horen, Akzente and in the anthology Grand Tour. Reisen durch die junge Lyrik Europas. She translated a volume of Elisabeth Borchers' poetry into English, a collection of the Irish poet Moya Cannon, and poems for two anthologies of Irish poetry into German.

She has taught in creative writing programmes at the University of Massachusetts, Boston as well as the MFA programme at the National University of Ireland in Galway. She received a number of awards, among others the Michael Hartnett Prize for Poetry, in 2020. She is a member of Aosdána.

Bourke's poem, "Snow Story", appeared in the 2025 Higher Level Junior Cycle English examination.

=== Personal ===
Since the nineties, she and her husband have divided their time between Ireland and Berlin. Her daughter Miriam de Burca is an artist and film-maker and one of her sons is Benjamin de Burca, a member of the artist duo Wagner/de Burca.

== Bibliography ==
- Gonella, Galway, Salmon Publishing, 1985, with drawings by Jay Murphy.
- Litany for the Pig, Salmon Publishing, 1989.
- Spring in Henry Street, Dublin, Dedalus, 1996
- In Green Ink/Mit Gruner Tinte (editor), 1996.
- Travels With Gandolfo, Dedalus, 2000.
- Winter on White Paper by Elisabeth Borchers (as translator), 2002.
- The Latitude of Naples, Dedalus, 2005.
- Landing Places: Immigrant Poets in Ireland, (edited with Borbála Faragó), Dedalus Press, 2010.
- Piano, Dedalus, 2011.
- fermata. Writings Inspired by Music, (edited with Vincent Woods), Artisan House, 2016
- Seeing Yellow, Dedalus 2018
- A Private Country/Ein Privates Land by Moya Cannon (as translator) edition offenes feld 2019
