= La novia de la Marina =

- Directed by: Benito Perojo
- Written by: Gregorio Martinez Sierra; Manuel M. Alba
- Produced by: Emelco
- Starring: Susana Freyre; Alberto Bello; Ignacio de Soroa; Nelly Duggan; Luis Rodrigo
- Cinematography: Pablo Tabernero
- Edited by: Gerardo Rinaldi
- Release date: 20 October 1948
- Running time: 72 minutes
- Country: Argentina
- Language: Spanish

La novia de la Marina (transl. Navy's girlfriend) is a 1948 Argentine comedy film of the classical era of Argentine cinema, directed by Benito Perojo and written by Gregorio Martinez Sierra and Manuel Alba. It was premiered on October 20, 1948.

The film narrates the story of a young rich woman who suffers from sleepwalking and a young man convinces her to marry with him.

== Cast ==
- Susana Freyre
- Alberto Bello
- Ignacio de Soroa
- Nelly Duggan
- Luis Rodrigo
- Manolo Díaz
- Tito Climent
- Teresa Pintos
- Iván Grondona
- Alberto de Mendoza
- Susana Campos
