= Beatriz Thibaudin =

Argentine film, stage, and television actress

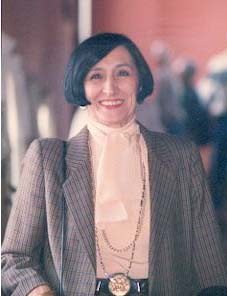
- Beatriz Thibaudin in 2003
- Born: August 9, 1927
- Died: February 7, 2007 (aged 79)
- Occupation: Actress

Beatriz Thibaudin (Buenos Aires, August 9, 1927 – Buenos Aires, February 7, 2007) was an Argentine film, stage, and television actress. She studied drama with Luis Gutman, Lito Cruz, and Augusto Fernandez, as well as body language, classical dance, American dance and singing. In her youth, she practiced horseback riding.

== Filmography ==
=== Movies ===
- Abierto de 18 a 24
- Tres esposas
- 1979: Contragolpe
- 1979: La isla
- 1979: El poder de las tinieblas
- 1985: La historia oficial
- 1986: Miss Mary
- 1986: Perros de la noche
- 1989: La eterna sonrisa de Nueva Jersey
- 1992: La amiga
- 1995: Hasta donde llegan tus ojos
- 1998: Dibu 2, la venganza de Nasty
- 2000: Esperando al Mesías
- 2002: Tan de repente
- 2003: Tus ojos brillaban
- 2004: La vida por Perón
- 2004: Arizona Sur
- 2006: Mientras tanto

=== Short films ===
- Las fotografías
- Mouse de chocolate
- Del color del cielo
- El círculo xenético
- La bicicleta del Sr. Arnalde
- El destape
- El intruso
- La vieja del agua
- El día de Navidad
- Anacronismo
- 2007: Simpatía
- 2007: Abismos

=== Television ===
- Nosotros y los miedos
- Compromiso
- Clave de sol
- Buscavidas
- Su comedia favorita
- 1991: Celeste
- La banda del Golden Rocket
- Alta comedia
- Mi otro yo
- Luces y sombras
- Son de diez
- ¡Grande, Pa!
- Inconquistable corazón
- Quereme
- Mi cuñado
- Señor K
- Poliladrón
- De poeta y de locos
- Los hermanos Pérez Conde
- Trillizos
- Como vos y yo
- Gasoleros
- Primicias
- 2003: Los Simuladores
- 2004: Culpable de este amor
- 2005: Hombres de honor
- 2005: Elefante blanco

=== Miniseries ===
- De los Apeninos a los Andes
- Marie Galanté

== Awards ==
- 2004, Argentine Film Critics Association Awards: Silver Condor, Best Supporting Actress (Mejor Actriz de Reparto)
