= Silvia Kutika =

Argentine actress (born 1956)

Silvia Kutika (born August 5, 1956, in Wilde) is an Argentine actress of Hungarian descent; the original family name was Kutiko.

She is best known by her roles in soap operas such as: 906090 Modelos, Vidas Robadas, Los Médicos de Hoy, De Carne Somos, and Manuela. In 1996 she married actor Luis Luque.

== Television ==
Year	Title	Channel	Character
1980	Calabromas	ATC	Several Characters
1980–1981	Galería	ATC	Silvia
1981	Laura mía	ATC	Valeria
1982	Después del final	ATC	Astrid
1983	Mi nombre es Lara	Canal 9	Ana Velazco
1983	Amada	Canal 11	Luz
1984	Lucía Bonelli	Canal 11	Carla
1986	Amor prohibido	Canal 11	Marina
1986	El hombre que amo	Canal 9	Viel
1987	Grecia	Canal 9	Alejandra
1988–1989	De carne somos	Canal 13	Silvina La Mamita Tacagni
1990	Amándote II	Telefé	Patricia Olmos
1991	Manuela	Canal 13	Mariana
1992	El precio del poder	Canal 9	Lucio's wife
1993	Primer amor	Canal 9	María del Carmen
1993	Alta comedia	Canal 9	episode "Una historia escondida"
1994	Quereme	Telefé	Diana
1994	¡Grande, Pa!	Telefé	Bárbara
1994	Alta comedia	Canal 9	episode"Volver a querer"
1995	Dulce Ana	Canal 9	Claudia Itube Montalbán
1996–1997	90 60 90 modelos	Canal 9	Cuca Dalton
1998	La nocturna	Canal 13	Fernanda
1999	Campeones de la vida	Canal 13	Victoria
2000	Los médicos (de hoy)	Canal 13	Claudia
2001	Ilusiones	Canal 13	
2001	PH	Azul TV	Sabrina
2004	Culpable de este amor	Telefé	Julia Rodríguez de Soler
2005	Historias de sexo de gente común	Telefé	Alicia
2005–2006	Se dice amor	Telefé	Juana Benegas
2007	El Capo	Telefé	Zulma Yariff
2008	Vidas robadas	Telefé	Alejandra Ferro
2009	Champs 12	América TV	Marina Torres
2010	Sin tetas no hay paraíso	Italia	
2011	Decisiones de vida	Canal 9	episodio "Aprender a dar"
2011	El hombre de tu vida	Telefé	Susana
2013	Qitapenas	Telefé	Joaquina Qitapenas
2013	Historias de corazón	Telefé	P: "Pompa y circunstancia"
2014	Camino al amor	Telefé	Lilian Suárez

== Filmography ==
Year	Title	Character	Director
1967	Escandalo en la familia		Julio Porter
1979	Las muñecas que hacen ¡pum!		Gerardo Sofovich
1980	Gran valor		Enrique Cahen Salaberry
1981	Sentimental (réquiem para un amigo)		Sergio Renán
1981	Los viernes de la eternidad		Héctor Olivera
1982	¿Somos?	Celia Valenti	Carlos Hugo Christensen
1989	Al fin y al cabo... "De carne somos"		Mario Millán
2004	Luna de Avellaneda	Verónica	Juan José Campanella
2011	Juntos para siempre	Sofía	Pablo Solarz
2012	Desmadre		Jazmín Stuart
