= Jorge Marrale =

Argentine actor

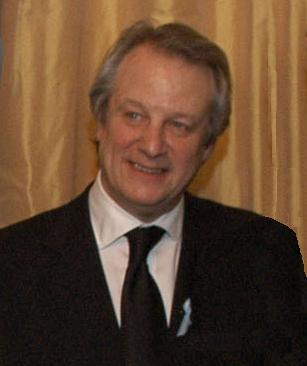
Jorge Marrale

Jorge Marrale (born June 30, 1947) is an Argentine actor.

== Life and work ==
Marrale was born in Buenos Aires' industrial Barracas section to a Spanish mother and an Italian father (from the Calabria Region), in 1947. His paternal grandfather had been an actor in Italy, and instilled an interest in the art on the young Jorge, as did a performance by Italian silver screen legend Vittorio Gassman.

He had enrolled in the Dramatic Arts Conservatory by 1970 and, shortly afterwards, was accepted into the National Comedy at the prestigious Cervantes Theatre. His first role in the theatre was in Tadeusz Różewicz' White Wedding, and he soon received roles in local productions of Fyodor Dostoyevsky's White Nights and William Shakespeare's Midsummer Night's Dream, among others.

Marrale was first cast in the cinema by director Alejandro Doria for Aída Bortnik's Contragolpe (Retribution), in 1979. He later took part in a public television production of Romeo and Juliet and in a Channel 9 production of Les Miserables (both in 1981). Alejandro Doria brought Marrale back for his 1984 drama, Darse cuenta (Realization) and he was given the lead male role by Beda Docampo Feijóo for her moody, 1988 Los amores de Kafka (Loves of Kafka). Docampo Feijóo also cast Marrale in her 1992 adaptation of Dostoyevsky's The Eternal Husband. Marrale also played the role of a shepherd in Spanish film director Carlos Saura's TV film El Sur, which is based on the short story El Sur by Argentine author Jorge Luis Borges.

He continued to perform regularly in the theatre, working with renowned Argentine playwrights Roberto Cossa and Pacho O'Donnell, among others. He has also garnered extensive television credits since his 1981 debut, cast in numerous roles in diverse genres as biopics, docudramas and telenovelas - mostly on Channel 9 and Telefe. Among the most notable was his role in Doria's production of Julio Cortázar's La salud de los enfermos (The Health of the Sick), in 1996.

That year, Marrale starred in an Eduardo Raspo's film noir, Geisha, as an heir involved in a probate dispute with an enigmatic young woman. He played the dubious father of a recently deceased lover of a nemesis of his in Marcelo Piñeyro's Cenizas del paraíso (Ashes from Heaven, 1997) and populist former President Juan Perón in Héctor Olivera's look at Perón's controversial brother-in-law Juan Duarte, Ay Juancito (2004), among numerous leading roles.

Marrale was reunited with director Alejandro Doria for his biopic on the embattled Father Mario Pantaleo (whom Marrale portrayed) in Las manos (The Hands), in 2006. The prolific actor has received numerous prizes for his work in cinema, television and theatre, continuing to be among the most active Argentine actors in all three media. He also teaches and, with Osvaldo Santoro, directs the Beckett Theatre in Buenos Aires.

== Awards ==
=== Nominations ===
- 2013 Martín Fierro Awards
  - Best actor of miniseries
