= List of Argentine films of 1990 =

A list of films produced in Argentina in 1990:

Argentine films of 1990
Title	Director	Release	Genre
A - Z
Bang Bang (1990 film)	Raúl Perrone	19 June	
Bésame mortalmente	Guillermo Fernandino and Luis Gutmann	7 June	
Casi no nos dimos cuenta	Antonio Ottone	25 October	drama
Enfermero de día, camarero de noche	Aníbal Di Salvo	9 August	Comedy
Extermineitors II, la venganza del dragón	Carlos Galettini	12 July	
Flop	Eduardo Mignogna	30 August	drama
Fútbol argentino	Víctor Dínenzon	19 April	Documentary
I Don't Owe 100 Times (Cien veces no debo)	Alejandro Doria	3 May	Comedy
País cerrado, teatro abierto	Arturo Balassa	26 April	
La pandilla aventurera	Miguel Torrado	5 July	
Últimas imágenes del naufragio	Eliseo Subiela	5 April	drama
Yo, la peor de todas	María Luisa Bemberg	9 August	History

== External links and references ==
- Argentine films of 1990 at the Internet Movie Database
