= Historias de sexo de gente común =

Argentine television series

Historias de sexo de gente común (English: Sex stories of ordinary people) is a 2004 telenovela about common people's lives revolving around sex in Argentina, produced by Endemol and aired by Telefé.

== Cast ==
- Juan Gil Navarro
- Carlos Santamaría
- Jazmín Stuart
- Carolina Peleritti
- Silvia Kutika
- Eduardo Blanco
- Mónica Ayos
- Susana Lanteri
