= La bailanta =

- Directed by: Luis Rodrigo
- Written by: Luis Rodrigo
- Starring: Teresa Parodi; Antonio Tarrago Ros
- Cinematography: Lionel Lobótrico
- Edited by: Víctor Villarreal
- Music by: Tránsito Cocomarola; Teresa Parodi; Antonio Tarrago Ros
- Release date: 17 August 1995
- Running time: 95 minutes
- Country: Argentina
- Language: Spanish

La bailanta (English: The Dancing Hall) is a 1988 Argentine musical film directed and written by Luis Rodrigo.

== Plot ==
The movie takes place in Argentina's capital Buenos Aires, shown to be a bustling metropolis that draws poorer Argentines from rural regions who are looking for improved economic prospects. A group of poor migrants to the big city fall on hard times when they experience an unforeseen crisis, leading them to move to a shantytown. In their desperate situation, they encounter the vibrant world of "bailanta", a lively scene of working-class dance halls, which becomes their sanctuary and a means of escapism from their harsh reality.

== Cast ==
- Teresa Parodi
- Antonio Tarrago Ros
- Alberto Busaid
- Rodolfo Machado
- Leandro Regúnaga
- Enrique Kossi
- Mario Alarcón
- Mabel Dai
- Alberto Lagos
- Luis Rodrigo
- Alba Rossani
- Willy Lemos
- Blas Martínez Riera
- Iván Barrios
