= Arturo Maly =

Argentine actor

- Maly in 1998
- Born: September 6, 1939; Buenos Aires, Argentina
- Died: May 25, 2001 (aged 61); Córdoba
- Occupation: Actor

Arturo Maly (September 6, 1939 – May 25, 2001) was an Argentine character actor.

He made over 50 appearances in film and television in Argentina since his debut in 1970, which happened on the television series Esta noche... miedo. In 1981 he received a Silver Condor Award for Best New Actor for his work in the film Tiempo de revancha.

He appeared in acclaimed Argentine films such as La Aventura explosiva (1977), Alambrado (1991), Corazón iluminado (1996) and La Fuga (2001), among others.

Maly died on May 25, 2001, of a heart attack.

== Filmography ==
- Fuga, La (2001) .... Pedro Escofet
- Campo de sangre (2001) .... Instruction Judge
- "Amor Latino" (2000) TV Series .... Leandro Villegas
- Los Pintin Al Rescate, Los (2000) (voice) .... Jorba Tarjat
- Cóndor Crux, la leyenda (2000) (voice) .... Phizar
- Operación Fangio (1999) .... Ambassador Quintana
- "Muñeca brava" (1998) TV Series .... Federico Di Carlo
- Inquietante caso de José Blum, El (1998) .... Dr. Hamán
- "El hombre de la bolsa" (1997 – cortometraje)
- Momentos robados (1997)
- "Signo, El" (1997) (mini) TV Series
- "Laberinto" (1997) TV Series .... Inspector Pujadas (unknown episodes)
- Corazón iluminado (1996)
- Geisha (1996) .... Commissar Arrieta
- Carlos Monzón, el segundo juicio (1996) .... Tonelli
- "Como pan caliente" (1996) TV Series
- "Último verano, El" (1996) TV Series
- "Nano" (1994) TV Series .... Noel Espada (unknown episodes)
- Cuatro caras para Victoria (1992)
- "Marie-Galante" (1992) (mini) TV Series
- Alambrado (1991) .... Harvey Logan
- "Celeste" (1991) TV Series .... Bruno Rosetti
- "Atreverse" .... Mario (1 episode)
- "Ave de Paso" (1988) TV Series
- The Stranger (1987) .... Father
- Memorias y olvidos (1987)
- Clínica del Dr. Cureta, La (1987)
- Cruz invertida, La (1985) .... Colonel
- Tacos altos (1985) .... Goon's Client
- Días de junio, Los (1985) .... Jorge
- Caso Matías, El (1985)
- Contar hasta diez (1985) .... Pedro Vallejos
- Cuarteles de invierno (1984)
- Noches sin lunas ni soles (1984) .... Rubio Páez
- No habrá más penas ni olvido (1983) Funny Dirty Little War (USA)
- "Compromiso" (1983) TV Series .... Various
- Últimos días de la víctima (1982) .... Rodolfo Külpe
- Tiempo de revancha (1981) .... Dr. García Brown
- Travesuras de Cepillo, Las (1981)
- Discoteca del amor, La (1980) .... Dr. J. B.
- "Andrea Celeste" (1980) TV Series .... Carlos Irastua
- Playa del amor, La (1980) .... TV Director
- "Hombres en pugna" (1980) (mini) TV Series
- Este loco amor loco (1979)
- "Somos nosotros" (1979) TV Series .... Roberto
- "Profesión, ama de casa" (1979) TV Series .... Gerardo
- Mañana puedo morir (1979) (TV)
- Parte del león, La (1978) .... Mario
- La Aventura explosiva (1977)
- Gauchos judíos, Los (1975)
- Gente en Buenos Aires (1974)
- Repita con nosotros el siguiente ejercicio (1973)
- Hijos de Fierro, Los (1972)
- "Esta noche... miedo" (1970) TV Series
