= The Hands (film) =

- Spanish: Las manos
- Directed by: Alejandro Doria
- Written by: Alejandro Doria; Juan Bautista Stagnaro
- Produced by: Christian Blanco; Horacio Grinberg; José Paquez; Maria José Poblador; Jorge Poleri; Facundo Ramilo; Luis A. Sartor; Daniel Viterman Ludueña
- Cinematography: Willi Behnisch
- Edited by: Marcela Sáenz
- Music by: Federico Jusid
- Production companies: Aleph Producciones S.A. Carbelli Producciones; Unlam
- Distributed by: Primer Plano Film Group; Transeuropa Video Entertainment
- Release date: August 10, 2006 (Argentina)
- Countries: Argentina; Italy
- Languages: Spanish; Italian
- Box office: $562,629

The Hands (Spanish: Las manos) is a 2006 Argentine-Italian drama film directed by Alejandro Doria. The plot was inspired by the life and work of Catholic priest Mario Pantaleo. Doria and Juan Bautista Stagnaro wrote the screenplay. The film won one Goya Award.

== Synopsis ==
Film based on the life of Father Mario Pantaleo, born in Italy and brought to Argentina as a child. He devoted himself to the impoverished and the ailing, providing words of solace, and those who believed that he could diagnose and heal with his hands.

== Cast ==
- Graciela Borges as Perla
- Jorge Marrale as Padre Mario Pantaleo
- Duilio Marzio as Monseñor Alessandri
- Esteban Pérez as Javier
- Belén Blanco as Silvia
- Carlos Portaluppi as Padre Giacomino
- Carlos Weber as Monseñor Arizaga
- Jean Pierre Reguerraz as Spagnuolo
- María Socas
- Juan Carlos Gené
- Liana Lombard

== Accolades ==
Argentine Film Critics Association Awards

- Won: Best Costume Design
- Nominated: Best Actor – Leading Role (Jorge Marrale)
- Nominated: Best Actor – Supporting Role (Duilio Marzio)
- Nominated: Best Actress – Leading Role (Graciela Borges)
- Nominated: Best Art Direction (Margarita Jusid)
- Nominated: Best Director (Alejandro Doria)
- Nominated: Best Film
- Nominated: Best New Actor (Esteban Perez)
- Nominated: Best Screenplay – Original (Alejandro Doria and Juan Bautista Stagnaro)

Goya Awards (Spain)

- Won: Best Spanish Language Foreign Film
