= Graciela Dufau =

Graciela Eugenia Chedufau, better known as Graciela Dufau (born 11 February 1942 in Avellaneda) is an Argentine film, theatre and television actress.

== Filmography (selected) ==
- 1987: Sofía
- 1980: Queridas amigas
- 1979: The Power of Darkness
- 1979: The Island
- 1979: La Fiesta de todos
- 1968: Crimen sin olvido
- 1965: Intriga en Lima
- 1962: The Old Young People

== Theatre (selected) ==
- 2002: The Vagina Monologues
- 1990-1997: Brujas, alongside Nora Cárpena, Susana Campos, Thelma Biral and Moria Casán

== Television (selected) ==
- 2012: La dueña
- 2018-2020: Incorrectas

== Awards ==
- 1988: Silver Condor Award for Best Supporting Actress in Sofía
