= Carolina Peleritti =

Argentine actress and fashion model

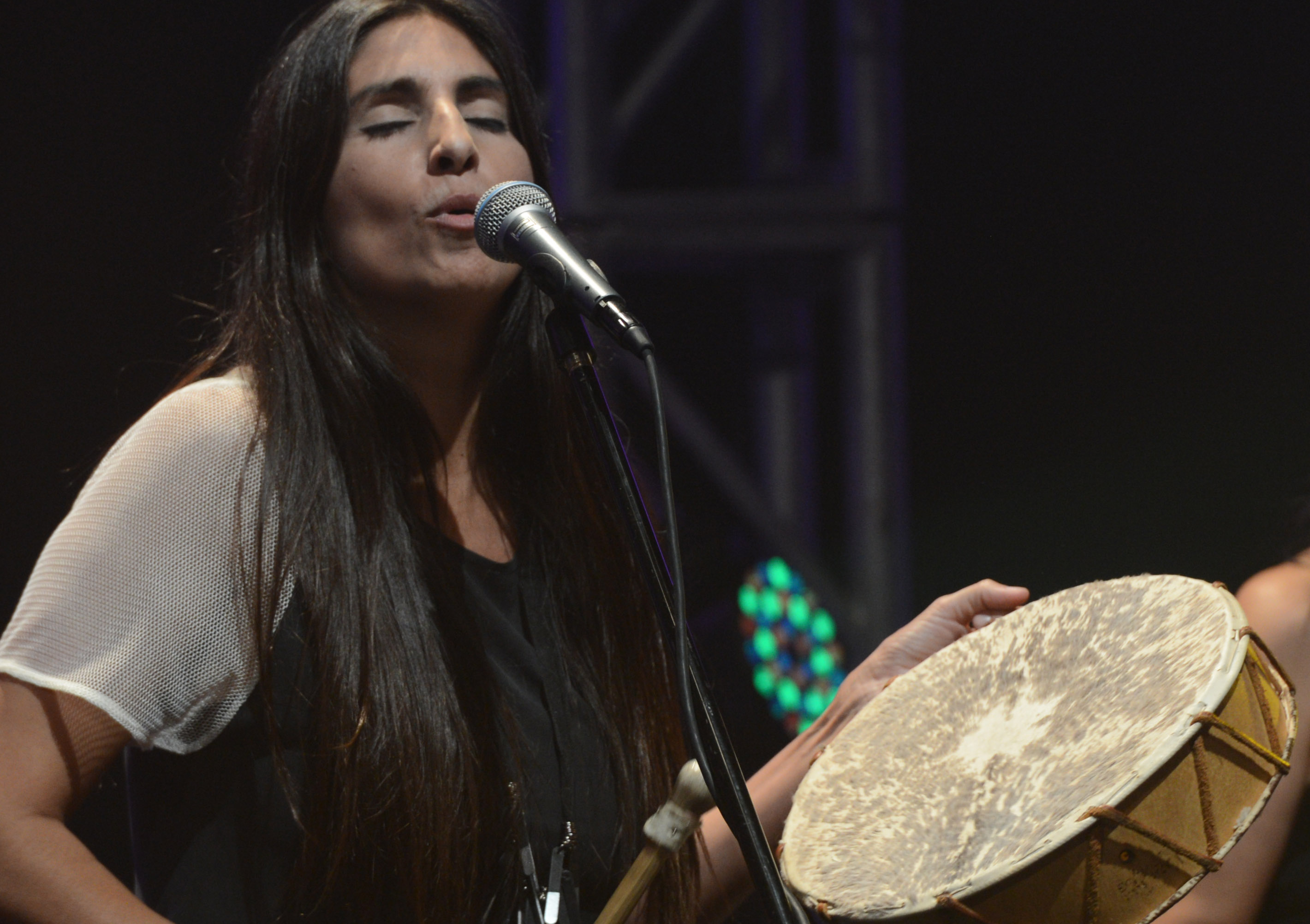
- Born: July 2, 1971 (age 54); Buenos Aires

Carolina Peleritti (born July 2, 1971) is an Argentine actress and former fashion model. She was born in Buenos Aires and took part in many TV series such as Boro Boro, La Marca del Deseo, Cybersix and 099 Central.

== Filmography ==
Cinema

- Geisha (1996)
- El lado oscuro del corazón 2 (2001)
- Samy y yo (2001)
- The Incredibles (2004, Rioplatense Spanish voice as Mirage)
- ¿Quién dice que es fácil? (2006)
- XXY (2006)

TV series

- Boro Boro (1992)
- La Marca del Deseo (1995)
- Good Show (with Tato Bores)
- Mi Cuñado
- Cybersix (1995)
- Infieles (2000, 2001)
- 099 Central (2002)
- Resistiré (2003)
- Historias de sexo de gente común (2004, 2005)
- Jesús el Heredero (2004)
- Ringtone (2005)
- Malparida (2010)
- Kissing Game (2020)

== Theatre ==
- Orinoco (1999, 2000)
- Confesiones de Mujeres de 30 (2000, 2001)
- 12 Polvos - Títeres Porno (2001)
- Monólogos de la Vagína (2001)
- De Rigurosa Etiqueta (2002)
- Porteñas (2003)
- La Señorita de Tacna (2004, 2005)
