= Gabriela Flores =

Argentine film actress

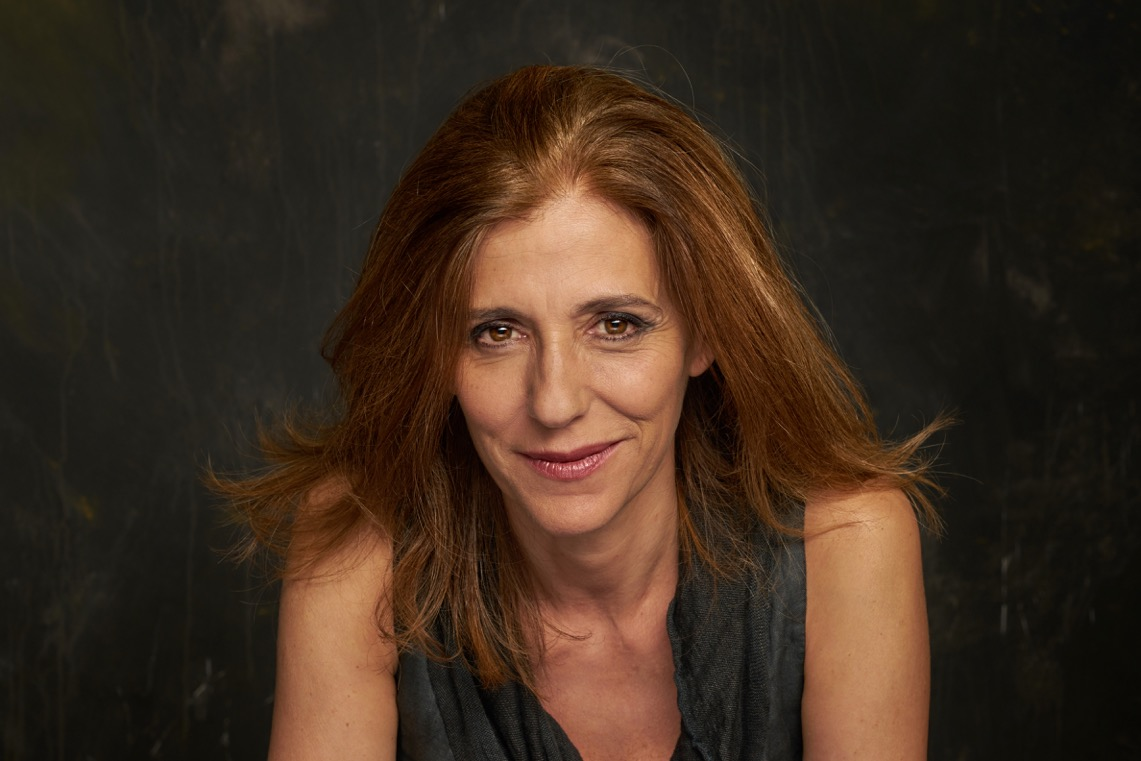
- Flores in 2022
- Born: Rosario, Argentina
- Occupation: Actress
- Years active: 1984–present

Gabriela Flores is an Argentine film actress.

She has made some 20 film appearances since her debut in 1984 in the film Pasajeros de una pesadilla alongside Federico Luppi.

== Early life and training ==
Flores was born in Rosario, Argentina, and studied acting at the Escuela Carlos Gandolfo in Buenos Aires before moving to Spain in the early 1990s to continue her training in Barcelona.

== Career ==
=== Stage ===
Flores has been a frequent collaborator of Carme Portaceli. Major appearances include:

- Krum (Festival Grec/Teatre Lliure, 2014), by Hanoch Levin, directed by Carme Portaceli.
- Troyanas (Festival Internacional de Teatro Clásico de Mérida / Teatro Español, 2017), version by Alberto Conejero, directed by Portaceli.
- Mrs. Dalloway (Teatro Español, 2019), after Virginia Woolf, directed by Portaceli—Flores played Angélica.
- La casa de los espíritus (Teatro Español, 2021), after Isabel Allende, directed by Portaceli—credited as Tránsito/Férula.
- La madre de Frankenstein (Teatro María Guerrero/TNC, 2023), directed by Portaceli.
- Las asambleístas (Las que tropiezan) (2023–24), written/directed by José Troncoso—Flores as Geométrica.

=== Screen ===
Flores began her screen career in Argentina. Early credits include Alejandro Doria’s Darse cuenta and Teo Kofman’s Perros de la noche, in which she played Mecha. Later work includes Genoveva in Fernando León de Aranoa’s El buen patrón, and appearances in Spanish television such as the dystopian series La valla.
