= La Aventura explosiva =

La Aventura Explosiva
- Screenshot
- Directed by: Ricardo Bauleo; Orestes Trucco
- Written by: Salvador Valverde Calvo
- Produced by: Orestes Trucco
- Starring: Víctor Bó
- Cinematography: Juan Carlos Desanzo
- Release date: February 24, 1977
- Running time: 85 minutes
- Country: Argentina
- Language: Spanish

La Aventura Explosiva is a 1977 Argentine action comedy film, directed by Ricardo Bauleo and Orestes Trucco and written by Salvador Valverde Calvo. The film starred Víctor Bó. The cinematography was performed by Juan Carlos Desanzo.

== Plot ==
Government agents guard the inventor of a new type of fuel which only works at a specific speed.

== Cast ==
- Ricardo Bauleo - Tiburón
- Víctor Bó - Delfín
- Julio De Grazia - Mojarrita
- Thelma Stefani - Victoria
- Aldo Barbero
- Hugo Caprera
- Adriana Costantini
- Juan Carlos de Seta
- Emilio Disi
- Enrique Kossi
- Arturo Maly
- Pablo Palitos
- Rodolfo Ranni
- Jorge Villalba
