= Alejandro Maximino =

Argentine actor

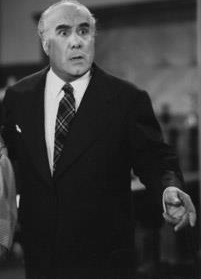
Alejando Maximino-actor

Alejandro Maximino was an Argentine actor. His last film was the 1962 film Una Jaula no tiene secretos.

== Selected filmography ==
- Madame Bovary (1947)
