= Heartbreak Tango (film) =

- Directed by: Leopoldo Torre Nilsson
- Based on: the novel Boquitas pintadas (1969) by Manuel Puig
- Starring: Alfredo Alcón
- Edited by: Antonio Ripoll
- Music by: Waldo de los Rios
- Release date: 1974
- Running time: 120 minutes
- Country: Argentina
- Language: Spanish

Heartbreak Tango (Spanish: Boquitas pintadas) is a 1974 Argentine drama film, directed by Leopoldo Torre Nilsson.

It was adapted from Argentine writer Manuel Puig's 1969 novel of the same name.

In a survey of the 100 greatest films of Argentine cinema carried out by the Museo del Cine Pablo Ducrós Hicken in 2000, the film reached the 22nd position. In a new version of the survey organized in 2022 by the specialized magazines La vida útil, Taipei and La tierra quema, presented at the Mar del Plata International Film Festival, the film reached the 47th position.

== Cast ==
- Alfredo Alcón as Juan Carlos Etchpare
- Marta Yolanda González as Nené (as Martha González)
- Luisina Brando as Mabel Saénz
- Raúl Lavié as Francisco Paez / Pancho
- Leonor Manso as Antonia / La Rabadilla

== See also ==
- List of Argentine films of 1974
- List of drama films of the 1970s
