= Intriga en Lima =

- Directed by: Guillermo Fernández Jurado
- Written by: Graciela Dufau; Carlos Orgambide; Guillermo Fernández Jurado; Paulina Fernández Jurado
- Release date: 1965
- Country: Argentina
- Language: Spanish

Intriga en Lima is a 1965 Argentine film.

== Cast ==
- Vicente Buono
- Joe Danda
- Joe Danova
- Graciela Dufau
- Jorge Montoro
