= Una Jaula no tiene secretos =

Una jaula no tiene secretos
- Directed by: Agustín Navarro
- Written by: Raúl Gurruchaga
- Production company: Visor Films
- Release date: 3 October 1962
- Running time: 74 minute
- Countries: Spain; Argentina
- Language: Spanish

Una jaula no tiene secretos (A Cage Has No Secrets) is a 1962 Spanish-Argentine comedy film directed by Agustín Navarro. The script was written by Raúl Gurruchaga The movie premiered on 3 October 1962. The movie won the original screenplay award of the year.

The plot revolves around the breakdown of a building's elevator, trapping its passengers. The breakdown occurs just before midnight on the last day of the year. The elevator operator is Alberto Olmedo, who still had some hair at the time. The light comedy includes various gags and humorous situations. The film was one of the last in which Carlos Gandolfo appeared as an actor. After being diagnosed with throat cancer, he turned to directing and teaching.

== Cast ==
- Martín Andrade
- Cacho Espíndola
- Gloria Ferrandiz
- Carlos Gandolfo
- Tacholas
- Juan Carlos Lamas
- Alejandro Maximino
- Pablo Moret
- Alberto Olmedo
- Rodolfo Onetto
- Carlos Pamplona
- Nathán Pinzón
- Javier Portales
- Luis Rodrigo
- Edmundo Sanders
