= Sentimental (film) =

1981 film

- Directed by: Sergio Renán
- Written by: Jorge Goldenberg
- Starring: Sergio Renán
- Cinematography: Alberto Basail
- Edited by: Miguel Pérez
- Release date: 2 April 1981
- Running time: 97 minutes
- Country: Argentina
- Language: Spanish

Sentimental (Spanish: Sentimental (requiem para un amigo)) is a 1981 Argentine crime film directed by and starring Sergio Renán. It was entered into the 12th Moscow International Film Festival.

== Summary ==
Among four friends, one meets an untimely demise, while another, who uncovers the truth behind the murder, becomes entangled in a web of criminal activities.

== Cast ==
- Sergio Renán as José Solari
- Pepe Soriano as Tano Piatti
- Ulises Dumont as Atilio Pécora
- Luisina Brando as China
- Alicia Bruzzo as Ginette
- Enrique Pinti as Franklin "Frankie" Viqueira
- Silvia Kutika as Fabiana
