= Carlos Gandolfo =

Argentine stage actor and director

- Born: March 24, 1931
- Died: January 12, 2005 (aged 73)

Carlos Gandolfo (March 27, 1931 – January 12, 2005) was an Argentine stage actor and director.

== Life and work ==
Carlos Gandolfo was born in Buenos Aires, in 1931. He was a director in local, independent theatres Teatro de los Independientes and La Máscara during the 1950s and in 1958, received his first film role in Simón Feldman's El negoción (The Bargain). That year, he met an 18-year-old aspiring actress, Dora Baret, with whom he began a relationship and married, in 1963. The couple had two boys: Matías, an actor, and Emanuel, a well-known local illusionist.

Gandolfo was not a prolific film actor, and his only significant roles were in Agustín Navarro's Una jaula no tiene secretos (A Cage Keeps No Secrets, 1962), and in Alejandro Doria's banned political satire, Proceso a la infamia (Trial on Infamy), which was made in 1974; but, released in an edited version four years later.

He was, however, well known in Argentine theatre, where an ancestor, Juan José de los Santos Casacuberta (1818–49), had been a lead actor in its early days. Gandolfo received leading parts in local productions of prominent works such as Medea, The Seagull, and Mother Courage and Her Children, during the 1950s and '60s.

Diagnosed with a throat cancer in 1972, Gandolfo was forced to end his acting career in the theatre, and he devoted himself to direction an instruction, instead. Among his many stage productions were those of George Bernard Shaw's The Man of Destiny, Arthur Miller's A View from the Bridge and Tony Kushner's Homebody/Kabul.

Kushner's play would be Carlos Gandolfo's last production, and he died in 2005 at age 73.
