= Mario Pantaleo =

Italian priest (1915–1992)

José Mario Pantaleo
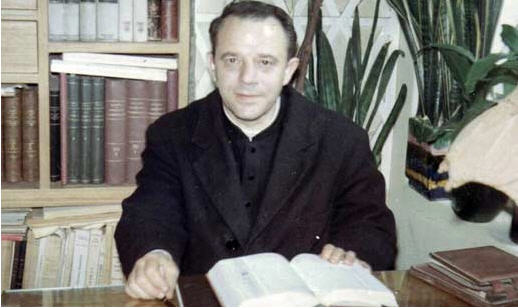
- Born: August 1, 1915; Pistoia, Tuscany, Italy
- Died: August 19, 1992 (aged 77); Buenos Aires, Argentina
- Other name: Padre Mario
- Movement: Padre Mario Foundation

José Mario Pantaleo (August 1, 1915 – August 19, 1992) was an Italian priest who lived most of his life in Argentina. He is known as Padre Mario. He was well known for the healings of thousands. He also established a foundation in González Catán, Buenos Aires Province, which includes, among other things, free health care and education up to college level.

== Childhood and studies ==
Jose Mario Pantaleo was born in Pistoia, Tuscany, to Ida Melani and Enrico Pantaleo. His father was a successful businessman, though much of the Pantaleo family's wealth was lost as a result of World War I. In February 1927, Mario, who already had endured a terrible bout of pneumonia that almost cost his life, and his family emigrated to Cordoba, Argentina, where Enrico's brother had business interests.

Enrico's entrepreneurships didn't work out in Argentina, so in 1931 the family returned to Italy. At that time, Mario already knew his destiny: to be a priest. On December 3, 1944, Padre Mario completed his studies in the seminary of Mattera.

Without a fixed destiny in his homeland, and bearing in mind that Cardinal Antonio Caggiano, leader of the Roman Catholic Church in Argentina, had asked the Pope for more clergymen, he went to Saint Pio of Pietrelcina for counsel. He encouraged Mario, saying, "Go my son, you're following your destiny. You have also been chosen for a singular mission."

Pantaleo returned to Argentina in 1948 and lived there the rest of his life.

== Early life in Argentina ==
His first destination in Argentina was the province of Santa Fe. He would be the vicar of the church San Pedro in Casilda; a year later he would be reallocated to the church of la Guardia in Rosario and then to the small town of Aceval.

At the end of 1951 he was named chaplain of the Hospital Provincial de Rosario. There he would meet three people who would have strong bonds with him for the rest of his life: Juan Lo Celso, director of the hospital, a young physician called Escalante de Larrechea, and Perla Garaveli. Perla met Padre Mario when she went to see him because of cancer in her uterus. That day, without asking Padre Mario for anything, he noticed her and cured her.

She recalls saying:

"The bleeding stopped"

To which Padre Mario replied:

"Yes, that's why you came here for, isn't it?"

== Miracles and life in González Catán ==
In 1958 Padre Mario decided to travel to Buenos Aires to study philosophy, an old passion of his. He wrote a letter to Antonio Caggiano asking him for the transfer. He was put in charge of the Hospital Ferrioviario. It was at this time that the legend began as he would cure people at a small apartment in the neighborhood of Floresta. People would line up long hours to be seen by the priest from Pistoia.

With his small savings, he bought a piece of land in the González Catán area to build a house and a church. González Catán was then a forgotten place with small houses, but that would change as the years passed.

Rich and poor would travel to González Catán looking for Padre Mario to help cure them. There have been hundreds of testimonies during the years, including from high-profile people such as historian Félix Luna, businesswoman María Amalia Lacroze de Fortabat, as well as former Argentine presidents Carlos Menem and Arturo Frondizi.

When healing others, he would proclaim himself a "guitar" to be played by the "guitarist", referring to him being an instrument of God's will.

== Foundation ==
The Obra del Padre Mario foundation is known for its vast community services and social actions developed because of its founder, Padre Mario's influence. Its main areas of action are health, education, the handicapped, the community, culture and sports.

=== Health ===
Seventy-two percent of González Catán's population lives in poverty, and public health can't cope with the estimated 550,000 requests for medical attention every year. In this context the Policlinic Cristo Caminante of the foundation has become an invaluable resource for the general population and especially poor people and young children.

=== Education ===
As Padre Mario said, what children receive in a classroom is something that will last a lifetime. The Pantaleo school provides education from Kindergarten to college level. In 2006 the college celebrated its first graduate. The Pantaleo school has the objective of giving González Catán youth the possibility to work at a higher level and thus help the whole community to develop.

== Movie ==
Alejandro Doria, a well-known Argentine filmmaker, decided in 2006 to make a movie about the life of Padre Mario called Las Manos. Although it was not a biographical movie it strove to show the spirit of Padre Mario. It starred famous Argentinian actors Jorge Marrale as Padre Mario and Graciela Borges as Perla. The movie was very well received by the critics and spectators. It was the best Argentine movie that year and people who knew Padre Mario (including Perla) stated the fidelity of the movie in portraying his life and spirit.

== Legacy ==
Padre Mario's legacy lives on in his foundation and the thousands he cured. His foundation helps to improve the quality of life of the region. Devotion for Padre Mario has not faded. There are hundreds who prayed to Padre Mario for help in an illness and have been cured, and there are several books with testimonies. Perla Garavelli is currently seeking the beatification of Padre Mario.
