= Agildo Ribeiro =

Brazilian actor

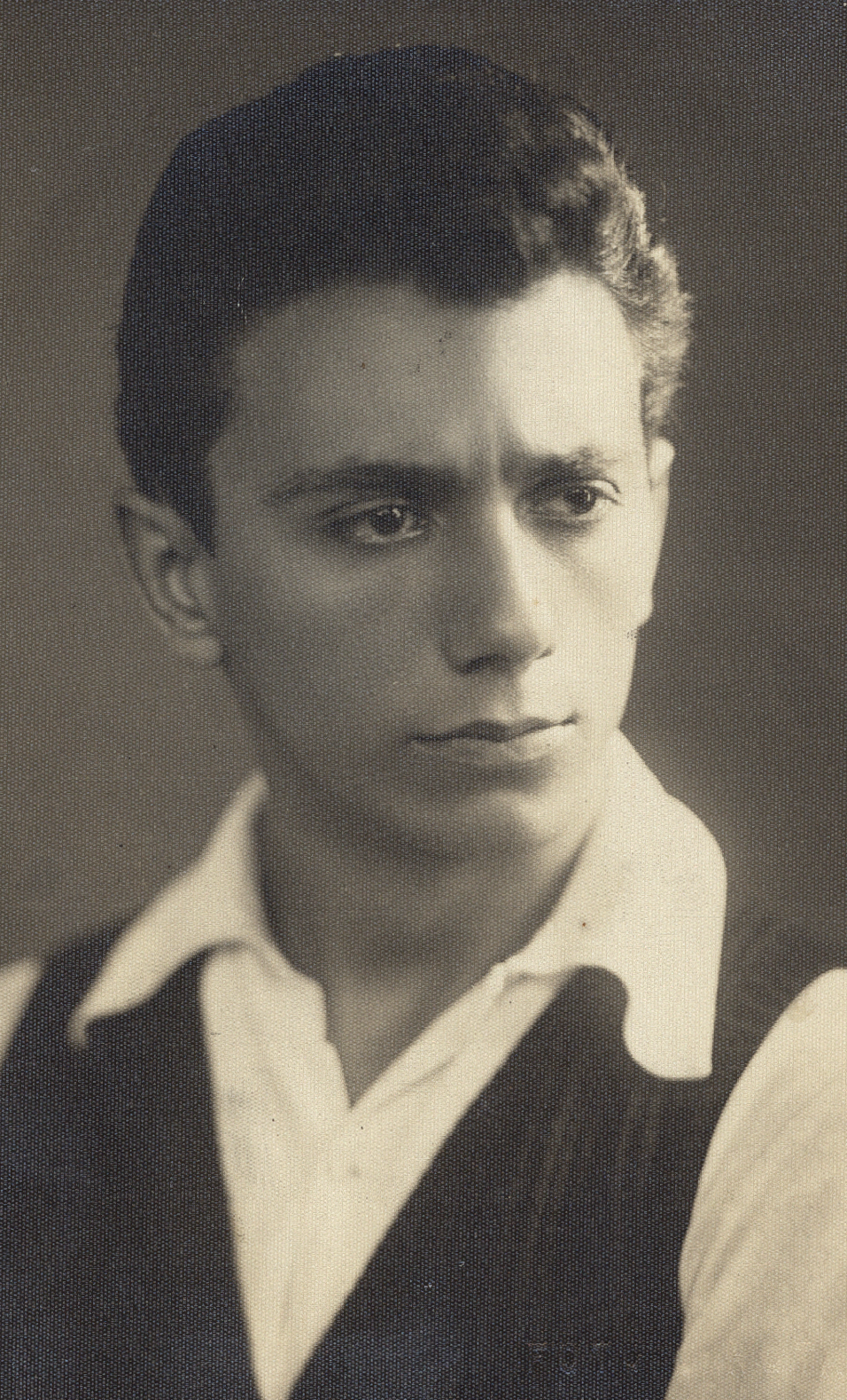
- Born: Agildo da Gama Barata Ribeiro Filho; 24 April 1932; Rio de Janeiro, Rio de Janeiro, Brazil
- Died: 28 April 2018 (aged 86); Rio de Janeiro, Rio de Janeiro, Brazil
- Occupation: Actor

Agildo Ribeiro (24 April 1932 – 28 April 2018) was a Brazilian actor.

== Biography ==
Agildo Ribeiro was born on 24 April 1932, in Rio de Janeiro. His father, Army officer Agildo Barata Ribeiro, participated in the Tenentist movement and the Revolution of 1930. His great-uncle, Cândido Barata Ribeiro, was the first mayor of the Federal District – at the time, the city of Rio de Janeiro.His mother, Maria Pascoal Cassapis, was the daughter of Apóstolo Pachoal Cassapis, a Greek, and Rosa da Conceição Couto, a Rio de Janeiro native of Portuguese descent. After the Constitutionalist Revolution of 1932, his family went into exile in Portugal, where Agildo Ribeiro lived his early years.

He became notable as a comedian in the 1970s, both in Brazil and Portugal, co-starring in several comedy programs on Rede Globo alongside Jô Soares, Paulo Silvino, and Chacrinha. During that period, his most famous program was Planeta dos Homens.

== Filmography ==
=== Television ===
Year	Title	Role	Channel	Notes
1965	TNT	Repórter		Rede Globo
1969-70	Mister Show	Presenter		Rede Globo
1970	Topo Gigio	Presenter		Rede Globo
1972	Uau,a Companhia	Various characters		Rede Globo
1973-75	Satiricom	Various characters		Rede Globo
1976-82	Planeta dos Homens	Dr. Cabral / Aquiles Arquelau		Rede Globo
1978	Caso Especial	Contador	Episódio: "O Homem que Veio do Céu"	Rede Globo
1982	Estúdio A...gildo	Presenter/ Various characters		Rede Globo
1983	A Festa é Nossa	Himself		Rede Globo
1983	Final Feliz	Himself	Special participation	Rede Globo
1984	Humor Livre	Various characters		Rede Globo
1985-86	De Quina pra Lua	Dante Cagliosto		Rede Globo
1987-88	Agildo no País das Maravilhas	Himself/ Various characters		Rede Bandeirantes
1989-90	Cabaré do Barata	Himself/ Various characters		Rede Manchete
1993-94	Não Pergunta que eu Respondo	Himself/ Various characters		SBT
1994	Escolinha do Professor Raimundo	Andorinha		Rede Globo
1994-95	Isto é o Agildo	Various characters		RTP
1997	Mandacaru	Salustiano		Rede Manchete
1999-2013	Zorra Total	Ali Babaluf / Manoel / Chapinha / Aquiles Arquelau / Professor Laércio Fala Claro		Rede Globo
2005	A Lua Me Disse	Coriolano		Rede Globo
2007	Sítio do Picapau Amarelo	Teotônio	Temporada 7	Rede Globo
2010	Escrito nas Estrelas	Durvalino Batista	Episódio: "24 de setembro"	Rede Globo
2010	Casseta & Planeta, Urgente!	Deixadylson	Episódio: "21 de dezembro"	Rede Globo
2015-17	Zorra	Various characters		Rede Globo
2018	Tá no Ar: a TV na TV	Himself	Episode: "17 April"	Rede Globo

=== Cinema ===
Year	Title	Role	Notes
1955	O Grande Pintor		
1955	O Feijão é Nosso		
1955	Angu de Caroço		
1956	Fuzileiro do Amor		
1958	Amor Para Três	Dr. Jacinto Abreu	
1959	Three Loves in Rio		
1959	Esse Milhão É Meu		
1959	Aí Vêm os Cadetes		
1960	Matemática Zero, Amor Dez	Jacinto	
1960	E Eles Não Voltaram		
1962	Carnival of Crime	Butler	
1962	Pluft, o Fantasminha		
1962	Tocaia no Asfalto	Rufino	
1962	Esse Rio Que Eu Amo		
1963	Crime no Sacopã		
1964	Êsse Mundo é Meu		
1965	OSS 117 Mission for a Killer		
1967	Na Mira do Assassino	Toninho	
1967	Jerry - a grande parada	Indelecio	
1967	A Espiã Que Entrou em Fria	Armando	
1968	Como Matar Um Playboy	Cucu	
1969	A Cama Ao Alcance de Todos	Agildo	
1971	Tô na Tua, Ô Bicho	Gugu	
1971	Como Ganhar na Loteria sem Perder a Esportiva		
1973	Divórcio à Brasileira		
1973	Café na Cama	Geraldo	
1974	O Comprador de Fazendas		
1975	O Sexualista	Fábio	
1976	O Pai do Povo		
1979	Gugu, O Bom de Cama		
2001	A Samba for Sherlock	Delegado	
2003	The Man of the Year	Zilmar	
2007	Sítio do Picapau Amarelo	Coronel Teotônio	
2008	Casa da Mãe Joana	Comendador	
