= Matthew Marsh (actor) =

English actor

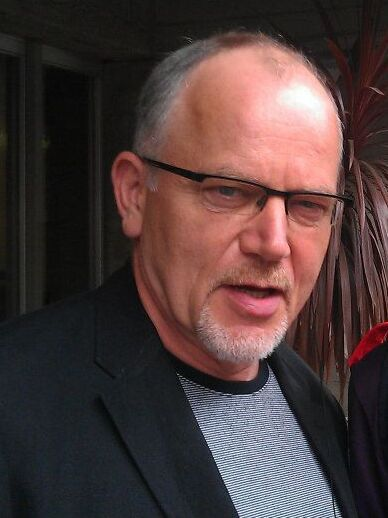
- Marsh at the London 2012 Paralympic Games Maker
- Born: 8 July 1954 (age 72); London, England
- Years active: 1981–present
- Relatives: Jon Marsh (brother)

Matthew Marsh (born 8 July 1954) is an English actor. He is the older brother of Jon Marsh of the English dance band "The Beloved". He has appeared in the films The Fourth Protocol (1987), Diamond Skulls (1989), Mountains of the Moon (1990), Alambrado (1991), Dirty Weekend (1993), Spy Game (2001), Miranda (2002), Bad Company (2002), Quicksand (2003) and An American Haunting (2005). In 2011 Marsh starred in the biopic film The Iron Lady as the United States Secretary of State Alexander Haig. In 2005, Marsh starred as Simon Hewitt in the first series of The Thick of It.

In May 1998, Marsh portrayed the character Alex Duncan in the British TV programme As Time Goes By, series 7, episode 3 entitled "The New Neighbours". He co-starred with Amanda Burton in The Commander, and guest-starred in the sixth series of the spy drama Spooks in 2007 and the second series of Lewis in 2008. He played Harry Gallo in the New Tricks (series 7, episode 9) "Gloves Off" in 2010. He appeared twice in Midsomer Murders (season 6, episode 3 "Painted Blood" and season 10, episode 7 "They Seek Him Here"). He has also appeared in the Red Dwarf episode "Holoship" and the fifth episode of series two of Game On, "Tangerine Candy Floss and Herne Bay Rock" as Brian Kennedy, Mandy's lecherous former university tutor in 1996, as well as portraying Elton John in John and Yoko: A Love Story the 1985 made-for-TV film. In 2019 Marsh went on to play Jacques De Molay, the ill-fated 14th century Grand Master of the Knights Templar in seven episodes of History's Knightfall.

His frequent theatre work includes Copenhagen (1998) and Blood and Gifts (2010). He played Winston Churchill in Michael Dobbs's play Turning Point which aired as one of a series of TV plays broadcast live on Sky Arts channel. The two-hander depicted a little-known October 1938 meeting between the future prime minister and Soviet spy Guy Burgess, then a young man working for the BBC. Burgess was played by Benedict Cumberbatch, with whom Marsh had previously worked in the acclaimed 2004 TV movie Hawking.

== Filmography ==
=== Film ===
Year	Title	Role	Notes
1987	The Fourth Protocol	Barry Banks	
1989	Diamond Skulls	Raul	
1990	Mountains of the Moon	William	
1991	Alambrado	Wilson	
1993	Dirty Weekend	Bascombe	
1997	Smilla's Sense of Snow	Detective	
2001	Spy Game	Dr. Byars	
2002	Miranda	Charles	
2002	Bad Company	Dragan Adjanic	
2003	Quicksand	Michel Cote	
2005	An American Haunting	James Johnston	
2006	Land of the Blind	Papa Max	
2006	O Jerusalem	Sir Gordon	
2009	Endgame	F.W. de Klerk	
2011	The Iron Lady	Alexander Haig	
2012	Red Tails	Brigadier General Hauser	
2017	Unlocked	Frank Sutter	
2017	Dunkirk	Rear Admiral	
2017	The Little Vampire 3D	Gernot	Voice role
2019	Mr. Jones	William Randolph Hearst	
2019	The Informer	Warden Leinart	
2020	The Mauritanian	General Geoffrey Mandel	
2022	The Contractor	Gray	
2023	Tetris	Mikhail Gorbachev	
2024	Hounds of War	President Lane	

=== Television ===
Year	Title	Role	Notes
1981	Strangers	Prisoner	1 episode
1984	Shine on Harvey Moon	Sydney	1 episode
1985	John and Yoko: A Love Story	Elton John	Television film
1986	ScreenPlay	Thomas Walsingham	1 episode
1986	The Monocled Mutineer	Charles Strange	Miniseries, 3 episodes
1989	Anything More Would Be Greedy	Mark Golan	Miniseries, 6 episodes
1990	Chancer	Gavin Nichols	Main role, 12 episodes
1991	Van der Valk	Willem Maas	1 episode
1991	Boon	Dr. James Harlon	1 episode
1992	Red Dwarf	Captain Hercule Platini	1 episode
1992	Sam Saturday	Neil Farrell	1 episode
1992	The Ruth Rendell Mysteries	Angus Norris	1 episode
1993	Cluedo	Terence Radcliffe	1 episode
1993	Between the Lines	Det. Sgt. Peter Woodward	1 episode
1993; 1995; 1997; 2000	The Bill	Various roles	4 episodes
1994	Coronation Street	Lawrence Cooper	2 episodes
1994	Crocodile Shoes	D.I. Machin	Miniseries, 3 episodes
1995	A Touch of Frost	DCI Hawkes	1 episode
1995	Bugs	Graeme Hurry	1 episode
1996	Into the Fire	Claims Manager	Miniseries, 3 episodes
1996	Madson	Det. Insp. Rourke	Miniseries, 6 episodes
1996	Game On	Brian Kennedy	1 episode
1996	Death of a Salesman	Howard	Television film
1998	As Time Goes By	Alex Duncan	1 episode
1998; 2008	Heartbeat	Keith Hibbert / Edgar Faussett	2 episodes
2000	Lock, Stock...	Attilla	1 episode
2000	Peak Practice	Mr. Lockwood	1 episode
2001	Silent Witness	Lloyd Dupen	2 episodes
2001	The Cazalets	Otto Rose	Miniseries, 2 episodes
2002	Holby City	Tom Vincent	1 episode
2002	Murder in Mind	Brian Balfour	1 episode
2003-2006	The Commander	DCI Mike Hedges	Main role, 8 episodes
2003; 2007	Midsomer Murders	Tony Carter / Jack Braxton	2 episodes
2003	Real Men	DCI Norton	Miniseries, 2 episodes
2004	Hawking	Dr. Josh Holloway	Television film
2004	Murphy's Law	Bishop Noonan	1 episode
2004	Belonging	Peter Fox	Television film
2005	The Thick of It	Simon Hewitt	1 episode
2005	Monarch of the Glen	Viktor Zinchinko	1 episode
2005	The Green Green Grass	Rupert	1 episode
2006	Hotel Babylon	Vladimir	1 episode
2006	Coming Up	Merrion	1 episode
2007	Miss Marie Lloyd	Alec Hurley	Television film
2007	The Street	Bob Hewitt	1 episode
2007	Spooks	Bob Hogan	Recurring role, 10 episodes
2008	Lewis	Henry McEwan	1 episode
2008	How Not to Live Your Life	Glen Menford	1 episode
2009	The Philanthropist	Kenneth Adams	1 episode
2010	The Special Relationship	Foreign Policy Advisor	Television film
2010	Luther	DCSU Russell Cornish	2 episodes
2010	Law & Order: UK	Jonathan Nugent	1 episode
2010	New Tricks	Harry Gallo	1 episode
2011	Hidden	James Morpeth	Miniseries, 4 episodes
2013	Jo	Egon Kroemer	1 episode
2014	Da Vinci's Demons	Ferdinand I of Naples	Recurring role, 5 episodes
2015	Arthur & George	Chief Constable Anson	Miniseries, 3 episodes
2015	Capital	Lothar	Miniseries, 3 episodes
2015-2018	Casualty	Brian Carroll	Recurring role, 5 episodes
2016	Churchill's Secret	Max Aitken, 1st Baron Beaverbrook	Television film
2016	The Coroner	Sidney Sutton	1 episode
2017	The Halcyon	Delane	1 episode
2017	Taboo	Exorcist	1 episode
2017	Riviera	Alexei Litvinov	1 episode
2017	The Crown	Dwight D. Eisenhower	1 episode
2017	Love, Lies and Records	Matthew	Recurring role, 5 episodes
2018	Girlfriends	Alan Forbes	2 episodes
2018	Patrick Melrose	Ballentine Morgan	Miniseries, 1 episode
2018	Humans	Lord Dryden	Recurring role, 7 episodes
2019	Whiskey Cavalier	Director Casey	2 episodes
2019	Knightfall	Jacques de Molay	Recurring role, 7 episodes
2019	West of Liberty	Clive 'GT' Barner	Miniseries, 6 episodes
2020	Grantchester	Harry Graham	1 episode
2021	The Nevers	Major	1 episode
2021	Endeavour	Percy Welsh	1 episode
2022	Father Brown	Lord Arthur Hawthorne	1 episode
2023	Vera	Phil Kingston	Series 12, Episode 3 Blue

=== Video games ===
Year	Title	Role	Notes
2005	Harry Potter and the Goblet of Fire	Death Eater #2 / Dragon Handler #2	
2009	Invizimals	Axel Kaminsky	
2011	El Shaddai: Ascension of the Metatron	Sin	
2015	Assassin's Creed: Syndicate	Karl Marx	
2019	Subnautica: Below Zero	AL-AN	
2022	Elden Ring	Miriel, Pastor of Vows/Isolated merchant	
2023	Xenoblade Chronicles 3: Future Redeemed	Ghondor	
