= Three Loves in Rio =

1959 film directed by Carlos Hugo Christensen

- Directed by: Carlos Hugo Christensen
- Written by: Carlos Hugo Christensen; Pedro Bloch
- Produced by: Carlos Hugo Christensen
- Starring: Susana Freyre
- Cinematography: Aníbal González Paz
- Edited by: Nello Melli
- Production companies: Carlos Hugo Christensen Produções Cinematográficas; Emece Filmes
- Release date: 26 March 1959
- Running time: 116 minutes
- Countries: Brazil; Argentina
- Languages: Portuguese; Spanish

Three Loves in Rio (Portuguese: Meus Amores no Rio, Spanish: Mis amores en Río) is a 1959 Brazilian-Argentine drama film directed by Carlos Hugo Christensen. It was entered into the 9th Berlin International Film Festival.

== Cast ==
- Susana Freyre
- Jardel Filho
- Domingo Alzugaray
- Fábio Cardoso
- Agildo Ribeiro
- Diana Morel
- Dina Lisboa
- Humberto Catalano
- Afonso Stuart
- Blanca Tapia
- Vicente Rubino
- Carlos Infante
- Marga de los Llanos
- Orlando Guy
- Antonio Ventura
- Antonio Camargo
