= Barbed Wire (1991 film) =

- Theatrical poster
- Spanish: Alambrado
- Directed by: Marco Bechis
- Written by: Marco Bechis; Lara Fremder
- Produced by: Roberto Cicutto; Diana Frey; Oscar Kramer
- Starring: Jacqueline Lustig; Martin Kalwill; Arturo Maly
- Cinematography: Esteban Courtalon
- Edited by: Nino Baragli
- Music by: Jacques Lederlin
- Release date: August 1991
- Running time: 90 minutes
- Countries: Argentina; Italy
- Language: English

Barbed Wire (Spanish: Alambrado) is a 1991 Argentine and Italian film written and directed by Marco Bechis. The film stars Jacqueline Lustig, Martin Kalwill, and Arturo Maly.

== Premise ==
The southernmost tip of Patagonia, in Argentina near to the Straits of Magellan, is an interesting place, with some of the roughest seas in the world.

It's a good location for a resort for travelers. As such, a British corporation has purchased property to build an airport.

However, holding up plans is a stubborn Irish rancher who won't sell his land.

In order to fight the proposed plans, he fences in his land and at the same time fences in his two late-teenaged children.

Eva Logan (Jacqueline Lustig) is particularly frustrated at this event as it prevents any romantic options she has.

== Cast ==
- Jacqueline Lustig as Eva Logan
- Martin Kalwill as Juan Loga
- Arturo Maly as Harvey Logan
- Matthew Marsh as Wilson
- Miguel Ángel Paludi as Father Corti
- Luis Romero as Clerk
- Gabriel Molinelli as Mechanic
- Enrique Piñeyro as Policeman

== Exhibition ==
The film was first presented at the Locarno Film Festival, Switzerland in August 1991.

== Reception ==
Wins

- Havana Film Festival: Grand Coral - Third Prize, Marco Bechis; 1993.
- Imagi Madrid Film Festival – First Prize, president of the jury Pedro Almodóvar; 1993.
- Sundance Film Festival – Park City, US 1994.

Nominations

- Locarno International Film Festival: Golden Leopard, Marco Bechis; 1991.
