= Miss Mary (1986 film) =

- Theatrical release poster by Steven Chorney
- Directed by: María Luisa Bemberg
- Screenplay by: María Luisa Bemberg; Beda Docampo Feijóo; Juan Bautista Stagnaro; Jorge Goldenberg
- Produced by: Lita Stantic
- Starring: Julie Christie; Nacha Guevara; Eduardo Pavlovsky; Gerardo Romano; Iris Marga; Luisina Brando
- Cinematography: Miguel Rodríguez
- Edited by: Luis César D'Angiolillo
- Music by: Luis María Serra
- Distributed by: New World Pictures
- Release date: 1986
- Running time: 100 min
- Country: Argentina
- Languages: English; Spanish

Miss Mary is a 1986 drama film directed by María Luisa Bemberg and starring Julie Christie, Nacha Guevara and Eduardo Pavlovsky. It was an Argentine-American co-production shot on location in Argentina.

== Plot ==
In 1938, Englishwoman Mary Mulligan (Julie Christie) arrives at the lavish estate of a wealthy Argentine family living outside of Buenos Aires. "Miss Mary" serves as the family's governess over the course of the next several years. As the primary caretaker of the family's three children, Mary teaches them English and oversees their childhood and adolescent development, at times both nurturing and disciplining them. As they move into their teenage years, the children mature, exploring sexuality and their place in society.

Meanwhile, the aristocratic world around them is falling apart. The adults converse about Argentine politics, hinting at the impending arrival of Juan Perón on the political scene, which will signal an abrupt end to their lifestyle. Compounding the problem is the state of the family itself: the patriarch, Alfredo (Eduardo Pavlovsky), becomes physically intimate with another woman. Enraged, his wife, Mecha, (Nacha Guevara) shoots a pistol blindly into the parlor where the affair is unfolding, and although the bullets cause no injury, the children are greatly disturbed. Mecha slowly deteriorates mentally and emotionally and grows stoically detached in the presence of her family.

A few years down the road, Teresa, the youngest daughter in the family, proudly announces to her older sister, Carolina, that she has lost her virginity. Johnny, their older brother, has a sexual encounter with a woman more than twice his age. Confused by the experience, he rushes home despite a thunderstorm and confronts Mary in her bedroom. After a brief moment of awkwardness, they embrace and spend the night together, capping off a long, vaguely defined relationship that has displayed both maternal and romantic tendencies. As Johnny sneaks back half-nakedly to his room in the early morning, his mother happens to see him stumble down the hallway. Immediately aware that Miss Mary has gone too far, she relays the information to her indifferent husband before returning to find Mary already packing up her things. She formally dismisses Mary, just as Mary reports that she is planning to leave the family anyway.

Later, Teresa is shown preparing for her wedding, which she expresses doubts about following through with. Motivated by her support for her sister and her contempt for the shallow world in which she lives, Carolina announces her intentions to boycott the wedding. Mary is present at the wedding, and she slips Johnny a note as he walks down the aisle in a procession of the bride's family. Shortly thereafter, Mary converses with Johnny, ultimately revealing that she plans to return to England now that World War II has ended. She boards a cruise liner and departs.

== Cast ==
- Julie Christie as Mary Mulligan (Governess)
- Nacha Guevara as Mecha Bordagain (Mother)
- Eduardo Pavlovsky as Alfredo Martínez (Father)
- Gerardo Romano as Ernesto Bordagain (Mecha's brother)
- Iris Marga as Mamá Victoria (Mecha's mother)
- Guillermo Battaglia as Abuelo (Mecha's father)
- Barbara Bunge as Teresa (Youngest daughter, as a child)
- Nora Zinski as Teresa (Youngest daughter, as an adult)
- Sofía Viruboff as Carolina (Eldest daughter)
- Donald Hugh Mc Intyre as Johnny (Son)
- Luisina Brando as Perla
- Alberto Busaid as Don Mateo
- Georgina Parpagnoli as Angelita
- Ricardo Hanglin as Toribio Reyes (Teresa's boyfriend)
- Carlos Pamplona as Don Jesús (Spanish concierge)
- Regina Lamm
- Anne Henry
- Sandra Ballesteros
- Anita Larronde
- Alfredo Quesada
- Oswaldo Flores
- Tessi Gilligan
- Carlos Usay
- Óscar López
- Susana Verón
- Alberto Marty
- Beatriz Thibaudin
- Laura Feal
- Susana Cortínez
- Juan Palomino
- Facundo Zuviría
- Lila Di Palma
- Mercedes Van Gelderen
- Paula María Muschietti
- Julio César Srur

== Note ==
This film is not to be confused with Miss Mary, the 1957 Hindi remake of the Telugu movie Missamma.

== Reception ==
The film was nominated for Best Foreign Film of 1986 by the U.S. National Board of Review of Motion Pictures.
