= Quicksand (2003 film) =

- DVD cover
- Directed by: John Mackenzie
- Written by: Timothy Prager
- Produced by: Jim Reeve; Geoffrey Reeve; Randy Lippert (United States); Bernard Mazauric (France)
- Starring: Michael Keaton; Michael Caine; Judith Godreche; Rade Serbedzija; Matthew Marsh; Xander Berkeley; Kathleen Wilhoite; Elina Löwensohn; Hermione Norris; William Beck
- Cinematography: Walter McGill
- Edited by: Graham Walker
- Music by: Anthony Marinelli
- Production companies: First Look Pictures; Cinerenta; Artisan Entertainment
- Distributed by: First Look Pictures; Cinerenta; Artisan Entertainment
- Release dates: 13 May 2003 (Germany); 16 March 2004 (US); 1 November 2004 (UK)
- Running time: 95 minutes
- Countries: France; United Kingdom; United States; Germany; Finland; Sweden; Norway
- Languages: English; French; Russian

Quicksand is a 2003 direct-to-video British-French-German co-produced crime thriller film starring Michael Keaton and Michael Caine, based on the book Boudapesti 3 by Desmond Lowden. The film was released in Germany, Finland, Sweden and Norway in 2003, in United States on 16 March 2004 and in the United Kingdom on 1 November 2004. Quicksand was filmed in South France between December 2000 and January 2001, originally set for a 2002 release. It was the final film directed by John Mackenzie.

== Plot ==
Martin Raikes is an American bank investigator who is sent to Monaco to check up on the suspicious financial dealings of a movie production. After the business trip, Martin, who is divorced, will fly to London to visit his daughter.

Martin is met by the film company's CFO, Lela Forin, who introduces him to the movie's leading man, washed-up action star Jake Mellows.

Something is rotten with the production, though, and Martin senses it. Unfortunately, he sticks his nose in a little too deep for the corrupt bankrollers' tastes, and is soon deemed a threat. Martin is first offered a mega-bribe, but he rejects it. As it turns out, the bankrollers are Russian mafia, led by Oleg Butraskaya.

Martin suddenly finds himself framed for an assassination attempt, and the hostile authorities—on the payroll of the mob—want to kill him. American authorities are also hot on his trail, investigating him for money laundering, among other false charges.

As Martin sifts through the mystery, he reveals the nefarious nature of Oleg's rackets, which include illegal pornography, kidnapping and money laundering. Not knowing whom to trust, he turns to Lela, but soon, she, too, is marked for death. Jake, who has gambling debts, is persuaded by Oleg to speak lines for the film that are actually used to make Martin believe the actor is holding Martin's daughter captive.

After a fight between them, Martin and Jake join forces with Lela to stage an illusion during which Oleg incriminates himself to the law. Lela develops a new film project for Jake and a personal interest in Martin.

== Cast ==
- Michael Keaton as Martin Raikes
- Michael Caine as Jake Mellows
- Judith Godrèche as Lela Forin
- Rade Šerbedžija as Oleg Butraskaya
- Matthew Marsh as Michel Cote
- Xander Berkeley as Joey Patterson
- Kathleen Wilhoite as Beth Ann
- Rachel Ferjani as Rachel
- Elina Löwensohn as Vannessa
- Clare Thomas as Emma
- Hermione Norris as Sarah
- William Beck as Nicoli
- Jean-Yves Berteloot as Vincent Deschamps
- Jean-Pierre Castaldi as Jean Pillon
- Colin Stinton as Harbinson
- Bogdan E. Stanoevitch as Oleg's Driver
- Paul O'Boyle as Close Cropped Man
- Patrick Mazet as Detective
- Paul Birchard as F.B.I. Man
- Bob Friend as Newscaster
- Sabrina Mongin as Nina
- Axelle Behary as Tasha
- Stéphane Lévêque as Desk Clerk
- Jake Broder as Technician
- Serge Soric as Scene Shifter Driver
- Ivan Marevich as Scene Shifter Driver's Mate
- Simon Smith as Mikhail
- Herve Candy as First Slavic Girl
- Aurelie Attyasse as Second Slavic Girl
- Sebastian Barrio as First French Man
- Pascal Saint-James as Second French Man
- Stephan Chrisz as Second French Man (Look Alike)
- Didier Casnati (uncredited) as himself

== Release ==
Quicksand was released in Germany, Finland, Sweden and Norway on 13 May 2003, in the United States on 16 March 2004 and in the United Kingdom on 1 November 2004.

=== Filming ===
Quicksand was filmed in South France between December 2000 and January 2001, originally set for a 2002 release.
