= Proceso a la infamia =

- Directed by: Alejandro Doria
- Release date: March 21, 1978
- Country: Argentina
- Language: Spanish

Proceso a la infamia aka Los Años Infames is a 1978 Argentine historical drama film directed by Alejandro Doria, set in the period that followed the Great Depression in Argentina, known as the "Infamous Decade".
