= Antonio Cunill Cabanellas =

Spanish-Argentine playwright, theatre actor, director and instructor

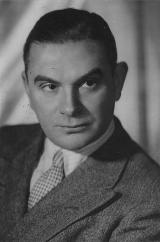
Antonio Cunill Cabanellas in 1938

Antonio Cunill Cabanellas (August 27, 1894 – February 18, 1969) was an influential Spanish-Argentine playwright, theatre actor, director and instructor.

== Life and work ==
Cunill Cabanellas was born in Barcelona, Spain, in 1894. His father, Juan Cunill, had been a well-known actor on the Catalan stage. He emigrated to Buenos Aires in 1915 and quickly gained prominence in the vibrant local theatre scene, and became an early cinematographer and actor in the Argentine cinema, appearing in a 1917 comedy, Carlitos en Mar del Plata.

He worked afterwards as an assistant director, mostly on zarzuelas and sainetes - comedy genres popular at the time in much of the Spanish-speaking world. He began writing, as well, and produced numerous of his own plays, notably Chaco, for which he won a Florencio Sánchez Prize in 1933. The establishment that year of the National Comedy at the newly nationalized Cervantes Theatre led to Cunill's appointment as its director, and he inaugurated the new institution in 1935. His first production was of local playwright Gregorio de Laferrère's Locos de verano (Summer Madness), which debuted to acclaim on April 24, 1936; he later adapted the play for the local cinema in 1942.

Cunill helped remedy the local shortage of skilled technicians in scenography and stagecraft by founding the National Institute for Theatrical Studies and authoring a number of technical texts and treatises. He also became Argentina's first vigorous promoter of local playwrights during his tenure at the National Comedy, and of 27 plays in its repertoire over five years, 26 were Argentine. The 1941 appointment of the ultra-conservative Director of the National Library of Argentina, Gustavo Martínez Zuviría, as head of the National Commission for Culture led to Cunill's resignation, however. He continued to be prolific as director on the local stage, producing a number of Leopoldo Marechal's works, notably La Tres Caras de Venus (Three Faces of Venus) in 1951, his own, notably Fin de semana (Weekend), in 1949, and William Shakespeare's (Midsummer Night's Dream, 1953). A number of the lead actors he discovered during this era, such as Eva Franco, Duilio Marzio and Pepe Soriano, later became prominent in both Argentine theatre and film.

Becoming assistant director of the National Music Conservatory, Cunill was named director of the largest popular stage theatre in Argentina, the public Teatro General San Martín, in 1953, and managed the institution during a difficult interim marked by a scarcity of venues (its new, modernist Corrientes Avenue building was under construction) and the instability leading to President Juan Perón's 1955 overthrow. Cunill resigned on the eve of these events, and he returned at the helm of his National Institute for Theatrical Studies, teaching at its facilities adjoining the Cervantes Theatre until his death in 1969 at age 74.
