= Contragolpe =

- Directed by: Alejandro Doria
- Written by: María Angélica Bosco, Marco Denevi
- Release date: 15 March 1979
- Country: Argentina
- Language: Spanish

Contragolpe is a 1979 Argentine drama film directed by Alejandro Doria.

== Cast ==
- Marcelo Alfaro ... Gigolo 1
- Enrique Alonso
- Alberto Argibay
- Raúl Aubel
- Aldo Barbero
- Sergio Bellotti
- Héctor Bidonde
- Luisina Brando
- Rodolfo Brindisi
- Cecilia Cenci
- Marta Cerain
- Martín Coria ... Detenido
- Lito Cruz ... Juan de Dios Tolosa / Carmelo Di Prisco
- Felice D'Amore
- Héctor da Rosa
- Ricardo Fassan
- Ana María Giunta
- Adela Gleijer
- Jorge Marrale
- Daniel Miglioranza
- Gloria Necon
- Julio Pelieri
- Ignacio Quirós
- Gigi Rua
- Tina Serrano
- Juan Manuel Tenuta
- Osvaldo Terranova
- Beatriz Thibaudin
