= Sofia (1987 film) =

1987 film

- Directed by: Alejandro Doria
- Written by: Alejandro Doria; Jacobo Langsner; Miguel Rodríguez
- Produced by: Diana Frey
- Starring: Dora Baret
- Cinematography: Miguel Rodríguez
- Edited by: Silvia Ripoll
- Production company: Rosafrey
- Release date: 16 April 1987
- Running time: 98 minutes
- Country: Argentina
- Language: Spanish

Sofia is a 1987 Argentine drama film directed by Alejandro Doria. It was screened in the Un Certain Regard section at the 1987 Cannes Film Festival.

== Summary ==
In 1977, a teenager assists a woman who is being pursued by the final civic-military dictatorship in Argentina and eventually falls in love with her.

== Cast ==
- Dora Baret - Sofía
- Héctor Alterio - Pedro's father
- Graciela Dufau - Pedro's mother
- Alejandro Milrud - Pedro
- Nicolas Frei - Silvio Núñez
- Alberto Busaid - Man in train station
- Lito Cruz - Pimp
- Mónica Villa - Prostitute
- Rafael Rodríguez
- Ana Sadi
- Damian Canavezzio
- Marcelo Serre
- Fabián Gianola
- Walter Peña
