= Luisina Brando =

Argentine actress

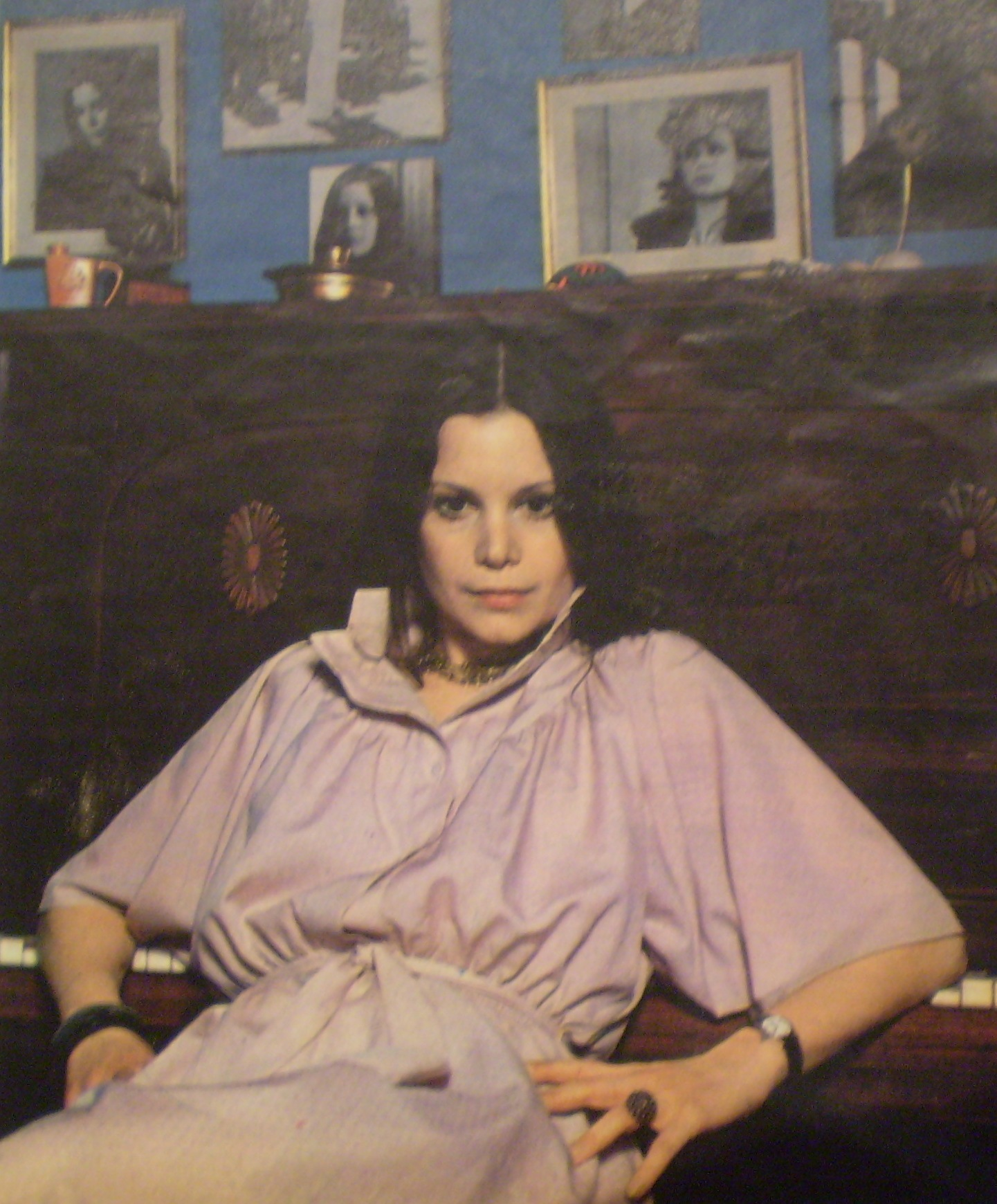
- Luisina Brando in 1968.
- Born: Luisa Noemí Gnazzo; December 10, 1945 (age 79); Buenos Aires, Argentina
- Occupation: Actress
- Years active: 1960–present
- Spouse: Juan José Jusid (ex)
- Children: Federico Jusid

Luisina Brando (born Luisa Noemí Gnazzo; December 10, 1945 in Buenos Aires, Argentina) is an Argentine actress.

== Filmography ==
- 1960: Telecómicos (TV Series, 3 episodes)
- 1961: Los trabajos de Marrone (TV Series)
- 1961: Viendo a Biondi (TV Series, 3 episodes)
- 1964: Teatro Trece (TV Series, 1 episode)
- 1964: El gordo Villanueva
- 1965: Llegan parientes de España (TV Movie)
- 1968: Estrellita, esa pobre campesina (TV Series, 29 episodes)
- 1969: El bulín
- 1970: Uno entre nosotros (TV Series, 19 episodes)
- 1970: Una vida para amarte (TV Series, 29 episodes)
- 1970: Otra vez Drácula (TV Mini Series, 5 episodes
- 1970: Historias para no creer (TV Series, 1 episode)
- 1971: Los vecinos son macanudos (TV Series, 19 episodes)
- 1971: La supernoche (TV Series, 1 episode)
- 1971: Juguemos al amor (TV Series, 19 episodes)
- 1971: Frente a la facultad (TV Series, 19 episodes)
- 1971: Dejame que te cuente (TV Series, 19 episodes)
- 1971: Así amaban los héroes (TV Series, 19 episodes)
- 1971: Puntos suspensivos o Esperando a los bárbaros
- 1971: Alta comedia: El avaro (TV Movie)
- 1972: María y Eloísa (TV Series, 9 episodes)
- 1972: La novela semanal (TV Series, 1 episode)
- 1972: La novela mensual (TV Series, 3 episodes)
- 1972: La bocina (TV Series)
- 1972: El alma encantada (TV Movie)
- 1973: Mi dulce enamorada (TV Series)
- 1972-1973: Malevo (TV Series, 329 episodes)
- 1973: La chispa del amor (TV Series, 3 episodes)
- 1973: El Teatro de Norma Aleandro (TV Series, 1 episode)
- 1973: Paño verde
- 1973: Proceso a una mujer libre (TV Movie)
- 1973: Miedo a quererte (TV Movie)
- 1974: Todos nosotros (TV Series, 19 episodes)
- 1973-1974: Humor a la italiana (TV Series, 6 episodes)
- 1974: Boquitas pintadas
- 1975: Juan del Sur (TV Series, 19 episodes)
- 1975: The Jewish Gauchos
- 1976: Juan que reía
- 1976: Piedra libre
- 1976: Nosotros (TV Series)
- 1977: Mi hermano Javier (TV Series, 29 episodes)
- 1977: Aventura '77 (TV Mini Series, 19 episodes)
- 1978: The Lion's Share
- 1979: Fortín quieto (TV Mini Series, 1 episode)
- 1979: Contragolpe
- 1979: The Island
- 1980: Somos como somos o no somos? (TV Series, 19 episodes)
- 1980: Queridas amigas
- 1980: Días de ilusión
- 1981: Mi viejo y yo (TV Series, 19 episodes)
- 1981: Sentimental
- 1982: Los especiales de ATC (TV Series, 1 episode)
- 1982: Juan sin nombre (TV Series, 39 episodes)
- 1968-1982: El mundo del espectáculo (TV Series, 2 episodes)
- 1982: Nobody's Wife
- 1983: Los días contados (TV Series, 19 episodes)
- 1983: La estrella del norte (TV Series, 19 episodes)
- 1984: Los gringos (TV Mini Series), 19 episodes)
- 1984: La señora Ordóñez (TV Series, 92 episodes)
- 1984: Nights Without Moons and Suns
- 1984: State of Reality
- 1985: Cuentos para ver (TV Series, 1 episode)
- 1985: La búsqueda
- 1985: There's Some Guys Downstairs
- 1985: Bairoletto, la aventura de un rebelde
- 1986: Miss Mary
- 1986: Muchacho de luna (TV Movie)
- 1987: El hombre de la deuda externa
- 1987: El año del conejo
- 1991: Alta comedia (TV Series, 1 episode)
- 1990-1991: Atreverse (TV Series, 10 episodes)
- 1992: Amores (TV Series, 5 episodes)
- 1992: Where Are You My Love, That I Cannot Find You?
- 1993: I Don't Want to Talk About It
- 1970-1994: Alta comedia (TV Series, 12 episodes)
- 1995: Go On, Carlos, Strike Again
- 1996: No todo es noticia (TV Series 1996, 3 episodes)
- 1996: The Salt in the Wound
- 1997-1998: De corazón (TV Series, 396 episodes)
- 1998: Como vos & yo (TV Series, 378 episodes)
- 2000: Forbidden Love (TV Series 200 episodes)
- 2001: Los médicos (de hoy) 2 (TV Series)
- 2002: Chela Fernández (65 episodes)
- 2002: Husband to Go (TV Series, 39 episodes)
- 2003: Soy gitano (TV Series, 251 episodes)
- 2005: Amor en custodia (TV Series)
- 2006: Amas de casa desesperadas (TV Series)
- 2007: Los cuentos de Fontanarrosa (TV Mini Series, 1 episode)
- 2009: Herencia de amor (TV Series, 272 episodes)
- 2011: Víndica (TV Mini Series, 1 episode)
- 2012: No te enamores de mí
- 2014: Doce casas, historia de mujeres devotas (TV Mini Series, 2 episodes)
