= Emanuel Gandolfo =

- Born: July 24, 1968 (age 58); Buenos Aires, Argentina
- Education: University of Buenos Aires
- Parent(s): Carlos Gandolfo; Dora Baret

Emanuel Gandolfo (born July 24, 1968) is a well-known Argentine illusionist and stage magician, performing as Emanuel.

== Life and work ==
Emanuel Gandolfo was born in Buenos Aires in 1968 to Carlos Gandolfo and Dora Baret, both well-known actors in Argentina. He developed an early interest in magic tricks and at age 14, began attending a local magicians' school. He enrolled in the University of Buenos Aires and received a degree in architecture, though he minored in drama, dance and fine arts.

He had made his first television and theatre appearances in 1985, and in 1987 performed for local variety show host Susana Giménez in her top-rated Hola Susana. Numerous other TV appearances followed, and an international stage magicians' competition in Brazil in the early 1990s earned him an award as best performer in his category, leading to his inclusion into the Centro Mágico Platense, a professional magicians' association active in Uruguay and Argentina.

He performed on numerous occasions in Hola Susana, Marcelo Tinelli' s popular Show Match (from 1997), and in Mirtha Legrand's morning show, from 2000. Numerous appearances in other Latin American cities followed, as well as in Univision host Don Francisco's Sábado Gigante, in 2001.

Gandolfo continues to perform regularly on television and the stage, including a local production of Sandy Wilson's musical, Aladdin, in 2004. He married Puala Volpe, with whom he had a daughter, Agostina.
