= Suddenly (2002 film) =

2002 Argentine and Dutch film

- French theatrical release poster
- Spanish: Tan de repente
- Directed by: Diego Lerman
- Written by: Diego Lerman; María Meira (Story); César Aira
- Produced by: Sebastián Ariel; Diego Lerman; Nicolás Martínez Zemborain; Lita Stantic
- Starring: Tatiana Saphir; Carla Crespo
- Cinematography: Diego del Piano; Luciano Zito
- Edited by: Benjamín Ávila; Alberto Ponce; Roli Rauwolf
- Music by: Juan Ignacio Bouscayrol; Murciélago
- Distributed by: Alfa Films
- Release dates: April 26, 2002 (Argentina); January 25, 2003 (Netherlands)
- Running time: 90 minutes
- Countries: Argentina; Netherlands
- Language: Spanish

Suddenly (Spanish: Tan de repente) is a 2002 Argentine and Dutch black-and-white comedy drama film directed by Diego Lerman and written by Lerman, María Meira, and Eloisa Solaas, based on the novel La prueba, written by César Aira. The drama features Tatiana Saphir, Carla Crespo, Veronica Hassan, among others.

A young, naive clerk at a lingerie store learns about love and her own identity.

== Plot ==
The film begins as Marcia (Tatiana Saphir), a frumpy and overweight salesgirl who seems to lead a banal and dreary existence, goes to work one day. As she walks she catches the eye of a feisty butch punk woman named Mao (Carla Crespo) who tells Marcia she wants to seduce her. Marcia tells Mao that she's not a lesbian, but Mao is relentless. With the help of her friend Lenin (Veronica Hassan), Mao manages to talk Marcia into getting into a cab that the two lesbian women then immediately car-jack.

They take Marcia to the coast to see the ocean—which she has never seen before—before ending up at Lenin's Aunt Blanca's (Beatriz Thibaudin) house. Lenin has not seen Aunt Blanca for nine years, and they discover Blanca rents out rooms to two lodgers. Blanca proves fascinating to Lenin and the two begin redeveloping a connection. Lenin confesses that she has not spoken to her mother in three years.

When they are alone Mao has sex with Marcia, then leaves her alone. We learn that Marcia is quite lonely since her boyfriend recently dumped her. She feels abandoned by everyone.

Marcia, Mao, Lenin, and Blanca all affect each other in unexpected ways, and as a consequence, develop new relationships that each of the women had lacked in their lives.

== Cast ==
- Tatiana Saphir as Marcia
- Carla Crespo as Mao
- Veronica Hassan as Lenin (real name: Veronica)
- Beatriz Thibaudin as Blanca
- María Merlino as Delia
- Marcos Ferrante as Felipe
- Ana María Martínez as Ramona
- Susana Pampin as Woman in Car
- Luis Herrera as Truck Driver

== Critical reception ==
Deborah Young, the film critic at Variety magazine, liked the film and wrote, "A delightfully unpredictable sleeper that proves new Argentine cinema really exists, Suddenly, by 26-year-old Diego Lerman, starts scary, moves through deadpan comic and comes out with a whimsical tenderness for its characters that audiences will share...[The film is] lensed in beautifully composed black-and-white by cinematographers Luciano Zito and Diego del Piano, [the] film looks like a realistic road movie topped by irony, with a melancholy air under its bravado. Cast is right on target, with Saphir, Crespo and Hassan all playing straight in different ways, yet all ultimately quite believable."

Critic Elvis Mitchell like the direction Diego Lerman gave the film and wrote, "Mr. Lerman, an Argentine, gives this story a spareness and is at his best when there is little or no dialogue...The stoic volatility of the opening 10 minutes matures into another movie altogether, one in which a tenderness develops among the threesome as they understand one another. You find yourself rooting for Mr. Lerman to pull off this maneuver. When Suddenly finds its soul in the last half-hour, the title begins to make a lovely sort of sense."

== Awards ==
Wins

- Buenos Aires International Festival of Independent Cinema: Audience Award, Diego Lerman (tied with Lavoura Arcaica); SIGNIS Award - Special Mention, Diego Lerman; Special Award, Diego Lerman; 2002.
- Havana Film Festival: Best Actress—Tatiana Saphir, Carla Crespo, Veronica Hassan, Beatriz Thibaudin, María Merlino (to the female acting ensemble); Grand Coral - First Prize, Diego Lerman (tied with Cidade de Deus); Special Mention, Lita Stantic (producer), also for Un Oso rojo; 2002.
- Huelva Latin American Film Festival, Huelva, Spain: Best New Director, Diego Lerman; Silver Colon, Best Screenplay (Mejor Guión Original), Diego Lerman and María Meira; 2002.
- Locarno International Film Festival: Don Quixote Award, Diego Lerman; Silver Leopard, Lita Stantic (producer) and Diego Lerman (director/producer); Special Mention, Carla Crespo, Veronica Hassan, Tatiana Saphir, Marcos Ferrante, María Merlino, Beatriz Thibaudin (to the acting ensemble, unanimously); 2002.
- Viennale, Vienna, Austria: FIPRESCI Prize, Diego Lerman (for a plot-twisting riot-girls road movie announcing the strength of an Argentine New-New-Wave); 2002.
- Clarin Entertainment Awards: Clarin Award, Best First Work - Film (Cine: Mejor Ópera Prima); 2003.
- Istanbul International Film Festival: Golden Tulip, Diego Lerman; 2003.
- Milan International Lesbian and Gay Film Festival, Milan, Italy: Best Film, Diego Lerman; 2003.
- Molodist International Film Festival, Kyiv, Ukraine: Sunny Rabbit Prize, Diego Lerman; 2003.
- New York Lesbian and Gay Film Festival: No Limits Award, Diego Lerman; 2003.
- Argentine Film Critics Association Awards: Silver Condor, Best Supporting Actress (Mejor Actriz de Reparto), Beatriz Thibaudin; 2004.
- Glitter Awards: Glitter Award, Best Lesbian Feature; 2004.

Nominations

- Buenos Aires International Festival of Independent Cinema: Best Film, Diego Lerman; 2002.
- Locarno International Film Festival: Golden Leopard, Diego Lerman; 2002.
- Molodist International Film Festival: Best Film Award, Best Full-Length Fiction Film, Diego Lerman; 2003.
- Argentine Film Critics Association Awards: Silver Condor, Best First Film (Mejor Ópera Prima), Diego Lerman; Best New Actress (Mejor Revelación Femenina), Carla Crespo; Best Screenplay, Adapted (Mejor Guión Adaptado), Diego Lerman and María Meira; 2004.
