= Carlos Pamplona =

Argentine actor

Carlos Pamplona was an Argentine actor. He starred in the 1962 film Una Jaula no tiene secretos.
