= Juan que reía =

- Directed by: Carlos Galettini
- Starring: Luis Brandoni; Ana María Campoy; Enrique Pinti; Luisina Brando; Federico Luppi; Gianni Lunadei
- Release date: 1976
- Running time: 100 minute
- Country: Argentina
- Language: Spanish

Juan que reía is a 1976 Argentine film.

== Cast ==
Luis Brandoni, Ana María Campoy, Enrique Pinti, Luisina Brando, Federico Luppi, Gianni Lunadei
