= Giancarlo Gandolfo =

Italian economist (1937–2025)

- Born: November 17, 1937; Turin, Italy
- Died: February 4, 2025 (aged 87); Rome, Italy
- Education: Sapienza University of Rome
- Scientific career
- Fields: International economics Economic growth Mathematical economics
- Workplaces: Sapienza University of Rome

Giancarlo Gandolfo (17 November 1937 – 4 February 2025) was an Italian economist. He has been a Professor of International Economics at Sapienza University of Rome from 1974 to 2010. Gandolfo is notable for his popular graduate-level textbook on dynamic economic theory.

== Biography ==
After graduating from the Lycée Italiano “Leonardo Da Vinci” in Paris in 1956, he took the “Course on French Civilization” at the Sorbonne (building) and the École des Hautes Études Internationales and the “English Language, Literature and Institutions” course Queen Mary University of London in 1956-57. A student of Vittorio Marrama, he Jurisprudence summa cum laude from the University of Rome with a law degree in 1960. Between 1965 and 1968, he attended postgraduate courses in mathematical economics and econometrics at the International Centre for Mathematical Education (CIME). The courses were conducted under the supervision of Bruno de Finetti, and taught by Nobel Memorial Prize in Economic Sciences such as Ragnar Frisch, John Hicks e Tjalling Koopmans, as well as distringuished scholars including Richard M. Goodwin, Edmond Malinvaud, Michio Morishima and Henri Theil.

Gandolfo died on 4 February 2025, at the age of 87.

== Selected works ==
- ——— (2009) [1971]. Economic Dynamics: Methods and Models (Fourth ed.). Berlin: Springer. ISBN 978-3-642-13503-3.
