= Alicia Bruzzo =

Argentine actress (1945–2007)

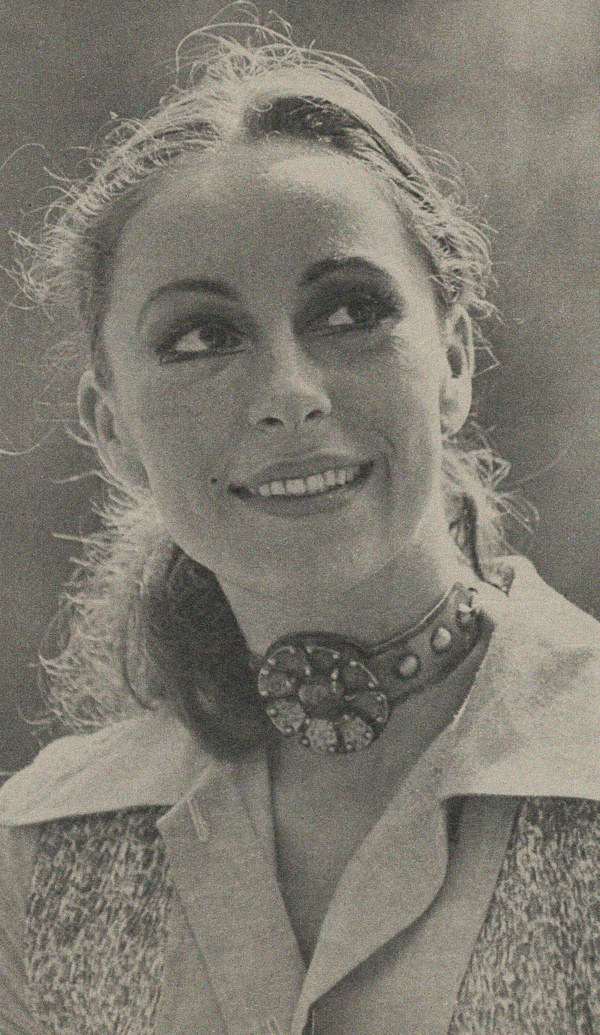
- Alicia Bruzzo in 1972.
- Born: Alicia Liliana Estela Bruzzo; 29 September 1945; Parque Patricios, Buenos Aires, Argentina
- Died: 13 February 2007 (aged 61); Colegiales, Buenos Aires, Argentina
- Resting place: La Chacarita cemetery, Buenos Aires, Argentina
- Occupation: Actress
- Years active: 1970–2005
- Spouse: Raúl Serrano
- Children: 1

Alicia Liliana Estela Bruzzo (29 September 1945 – 13 February 2007), known as ⁣⁣Alicia Bruzzo⁣⁣, was an Argentine actress, born in Buenos Aires to a family of artists. Starting in 1972, she worked in 17 films. She was renowned for her work in television and theater; among her most memorable roles were in ″⁣Una sombra ya pronto serás″⁣ (″⁣A Shadow, You Shall Soon Be″⁣, 1994) and as that of a lonely heart in ″⁣De mi barrio con amor″⁣ (″⁣From My Neighborhood, with Love,″⁣ 1995), both opposite Luis Brandoni. She won Martín Fierro Awards in 1990 and 1992, and Estrella de Mar Awards in 2003 and 2005.

Bruzzo was diagnosed with lung cancer, and died in Buenos Aires in 2007, at the age of 61.

== Selected filmography ==
- ″⁣The Island″⁣ (1979)
- ″⁣Sentimental″⁣ (1981)
