= Tacholas =

Argentine actor

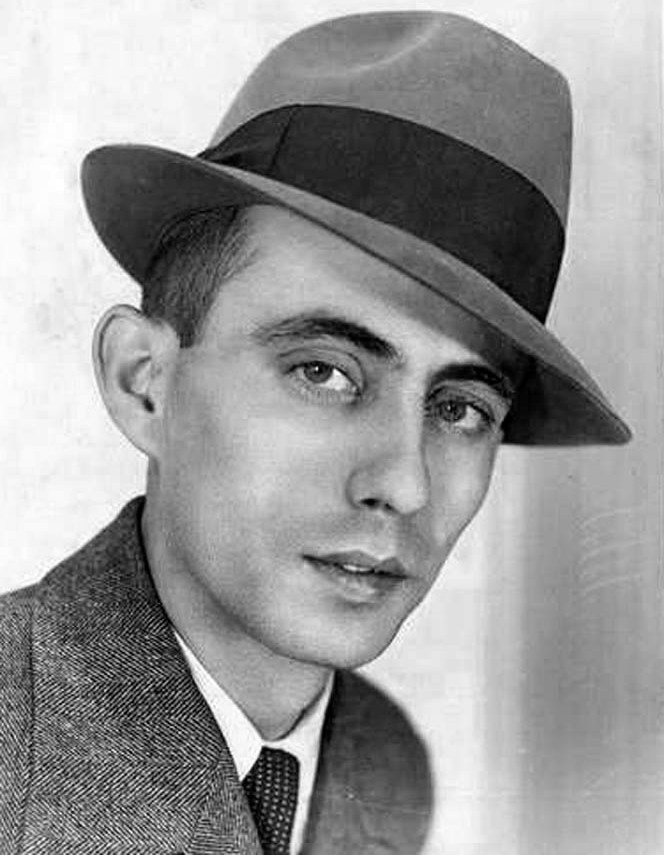
- Sánchez c. 1940
- Born: Fernando Luís Iglesias Sánchez; August 25, 1909; Ourense, Galicia
- Died: May 14, 1991 (aged 81); Buenos Aires, Argentina
- Other names: Fernando Iglesias
- Occupation: Actor

Fernando Luís Iglesias Sánchez (August 25, 1909 – May 14, 1991), known as Fernando Iglesias or "Tacholas", was a Spanish-born Argentine actor. He starred in the 1962 film Una Jaula no tiene secretos.
