= La República perdida =

La República perdida ("The Lost Republic") is the name of a series of Argentine documentary films about the history of Argentina. It is focused on the Coups d'état in Argentina, and uses photos and videotapes, while Aldo Barbero narrates it. It was directed by Miguel Pérez.

The first documentary film was edited in 1983, after the end of the National Reorganization Process (the last coups d'état in Argentina) and the return of democratic rule. The second one, La república perdida II, was edited in 1986.

== Summary and analysis ==
Documentary exploring Argentine history spanning the period from 1930 to 1976, using documentary films from that era. The documentary series was influential in the popular historiography of Argentina.

It is known as not having shown the history of the indigenous people of Argentina.
