= Carlos Orgambide =

Argentine film director and screenwriter (1930–2026)

Carlos Gdansky Orgambide (28 September 1930 – 27 March 2026), better known by his stage name Carlos Orgambide, was an Argentine film director, cinematographer and screenwriter.

Orgambide died on 27 March 2026, at the age of 95. He was the younger brother of author Pedro Orgambide.

== Selected filmography ==
- El Hombre y su noche (1958)
- Intriga en Lima (1965)
- Queridas amigas (1980)
- The Supporter (1991)

== Awards ==
- 1992 Silver Condor Award for Best Adapted Screenplay for The Supporter (shared with Bernardo Roitman)
