= Paula cautiva =

- Directed by: Fernando Ayala
- Release date: 1963
- Running time: 95 minutes
- Country: Argentina
- Language: Spanish

Paula cautiva is a 1963 Argentine film directed by Fernando Ayala. It won the Silver Condor Award for Best Film.

== Cast ==
- Susana Freyre
- Duilio Marzio
- Lautaro Murúa
- Fernanda Mistral
- Orestes Caviglia
