= The Candidate (1959 film) =

1959 film

- Directed by: Fernando Ayala
- Written by: Fernando Ayala
- Produced by: Fernando Ayala
- Starring: Olga Zubarry; Duilio Marzio; Alfredo Alcón
- Cinematography: Américo Hoss
- Edited by: Ricardo Rodríguez Nistal; Atilio Rinaldi
- Music by: Virtú Maragno
- Production company: Aries Cinematográfica Argentina
- Release date: 1959
- Running time: 95 minutes
- Country: Argentina
- Language: Spanish

The Candidate (Spanish: El candidato) is a 1959 Argentine drama film directed by Fernando Ayala and starring Olga Zubarry, Duilio Marzio and Alfredo Alcón.

The film's sets were designed by the art director Mario Vanarelli.

== Cast ==
- Alfredo Alcón
- Hugo Astar
- Guillermo Battaglia
- Julián Bourges
- Héctor Calcaño
- Alberto Candeau
- Domingo Mania
- Iris Marga
- Duilio Marzio
- Orestes Soriani
- Olga Zubarry

== Bibliography ==
- Michael Pigott & Santiago Oyarzabel. World Film Locations: Buenos Aires. Intellect Ltd, 2014.
