= Queridas amigas =

1980 film by Carlos Orgambide

- Directed by: Carlos Orgambide
- Release date: 5 June 1980
- Running time: 92 minute
- Country: Argentina
- Language: Spanish

Queridas amigas ("Dear Friends") is an Argentine film shot in Eastmancolor, directed by Carlos Orgambide based on his own screenplay, co-written with Pedro Stocki, based on the story by Carlos Orgambide and Elena Antonietto. It was released on June 5, 1980, and starred Dora Baret, Luisina Brando, Graciela Dufau, and Carlos Estrada. It was partially filmed in Catamarca.

== Summary ==
Three childhood friends reunite and travel to the countryside, where a critical situation will make them open up to each other.

== Cast ==
- Dora Baret
- Luisina Brando
- Graciela Dufau
- Carlos Estrada
- Marcela López Rey
- Rodolfo Ranni
- Héctor Pellegrini
- Roberto Carnaghi
- Carlos De La Rosa
- Susana Latou
- Mario Luciani
- Ana María Giunta
