= The Island (1979 film) =

1979 film

La isla
- Directed by: Alejandro Doria
- Written by: Aída Bortnik; Alejandro Doria
- Produced by: Lita Stantic
- Starring: Selva Alemán; Hugo Arana
- Cinematography: Miguel Rodríguez
- Edited by: Miguel Pérez
- Release date: 9 August 1979
- Running time: 106 minutes
- Country: Argentina
- Language: Spanish

The Island (Spanish: La isla) is a 1979 Argentine drama film written and directed by Alejandro Doria. It was the first Argentine film to be a box office success during the military dictatorship. The film was also selected as the Argentine entry for the Best Foreign Language Film at the 52nd Academy Awards, but was not accepted as a nominee.

== Cast ==
- Selva Alemán
- Hugo Arana
- Aldo Barbero
- Héctor Bidonde
- Luisina Brando
- Alicia Bruzzo
- Franklin Caicedo
- Lito Cruz
- Graciela Dufau
- Juan Carlos Gianuzzi
- Lisardo Laphitz
- Sandra Mihanovich
- Aníbal Morixe
- Marzenka Novak

== See also ==
- List of submissions to the 52nd Academy Awards for Best Foreign Language Film
- List of Argentine submissions for the Academy Award for Best Foreign Language Film
