= Susana Freyre =

Argentine actress (1929–2026)

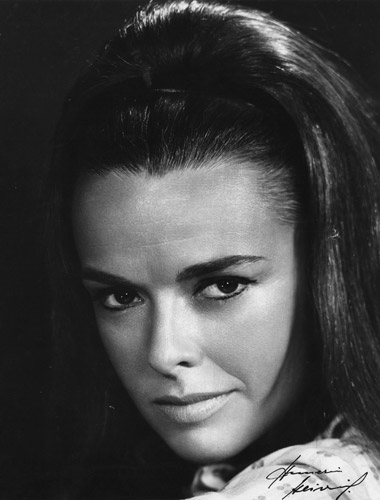
- Freyre in 1968, by Annemarie Heinrich
- Born: 5 September 1929; Rosario, Santa Fe, Argentina
- Died: 2 July 2026 (aged 96); São Paulo, Brazil
- Occupation: Actress
- Years active: 1945–1984

Susana Guénola Zubiri Vidal (5 September 1929 – 2 July 2026), better known as Susana Freyre, was an Argentine actress. She began her career during the classical era of Argentine cinema and appeared in 30 films and television shows between 1945 and 1984. She starred in the film Three Loves in Rio, which was entered into the 9th Berlin International Film Festival.

== Life and career ==
Susana Guénola Zubiri Vidal was born on 5 September 1929. Her mother's surname was Vidal. She began his work in film in 1945 in Las seis suegras de Barba Azul directed by Carlos Hugo Christensen (1914-1999), whom she married and who would direct most of the films in which she participated and accompanied him during his stay in Mexico.

Among her performances she remembered the character of Paula, an aristocrat who came unless she worked as a "call girl" with Fernanda Mistral, in the film PAULA CAUTIVA (1963) in which she participated with Duilio Marzio, Lautaro Murua. Directed by Fernando Ayala, it is about a story by Beatriz Guido, whose action took place during a military revolt in 1962, and which earned her the 1964 Silver Condor Award for best actress. There she sings and plays the guitar (works by Astor Piazzolla).

In the theatre she starred in many plays, such as El Hombre de Mundo by Ventura de la Vega, in the Teatro Nacional Cervantes (1969) with Esteban Serrador and Rosa Rosen.

Freyre filmed in Argentina, Brazil, Venezuela and Mexico.

In 2003, she was awarded the prize for her career by the Association of Film Reporters of Argentina. She received the award together with Elsa Daniel, María Vaner and Duilio Marzio.

In 2012, she presented the Condor de Plata awards (at the Avenida Theatre in Buenos Aires).

On 27 August 2012, at the Tabarís Theater, the SAGAI Foundation presented the "Recognition of the 2012 Trajectory" award to audiovisual figures over 80 years of age.

Freyre died on 2 July 2026, at the age of 96.

== Filmography ==
- 1945: Swan Song
- 1945: Sofía
- 1945: Las seis suegras de Barba Azul
- 1946: No salgas esta noche
- 1946: Becquer's Great Love
- 1947: Con el diablo en el cuerpo
- 1948: Una Atrevida aventurita
- 1948: La novia de la Marina
- 1949: ¿Por qué mintió la cigüeña?
- 1950: La loca de la casa
- 1951: El demonio es un ángel
- 1953: Un ángel sin pudor
- 1955: Leonora of the Seven Seas
- 1959: Three Loves in Rio
- 1960: Amor Para Três
- 1960: Matemática Zero, Amor Dez
- 1963: Paula cautiva
- 1964: Me First
- 1965: Show Standard Electric (TV Mini Series, 9 episodes)
- 1966: Teatro Grand Guignol (TV Series, 1 episode)
- 1966: La búsqueda (TV Series, 3 episodes)
- 1965: El patio de Tlaquepaque (TV Series, 3 episodes)
- 1966: El despertar (TV Series, 3 episodes)
- 1966: A orillas del gran silencio (TV Movie)
- 1967: Mujeres en presidio (TV Series, 19 episodes)
- 1968: Su comedia favorita (TV Series, 1 episode)
- 1970: Matrimonios y algo más (TV Series, 3 episodes)
- 1970: El principio y el fin (TV Series, 19 episodes)
- 1970: Do... Re... Mi... Papá (TV Series, 19 episodes)
- 1971: Teatro 13 (TV Series, 2 episodes)
- 1971: Nosotros también reímos (TV Series, 18 episodes)
- 1971: Ciclo de teatro argentino (TV Series, 1 episode)
- 1972: La buena gente (TV Series, 3 episodes)
- 1973: Teatro como en el teatro (TV Series)
- 1974: Enséñame a quererte (TV Series, 39 episodes)
- 1974: La flor de la mafia
- 1979: Somos nosotros (TV Series, 19 episodes)
- 1981: Eugenia (TV Series, 19 episodes)
- 1982: Todo tuyo (TV Series, 16 episodes)
- 1982: La búsqueda (TV Series, 3 episodes)
- 1983: Cuando es culpable el amor (TV Series, 19 episodes)
- 1983: Cara a cara (TV Series, 80 episodes)
- 1984: Entre el amor y el poder (TV Series, 59 episodes)
- 2020: El Tabarís, lleno de estrellas (TV Movie)
