= Luis Rodrigo =

Argentine actor

Luis Rodrigo was an Argentine actor. He starred in the 1962 film Una Jaula no tiene secretos.

== Selected filmography ==
- La Bailanta (1988)
- The Troublemaker (1950)
- The Orchid (1951)
