= Iris Marga =

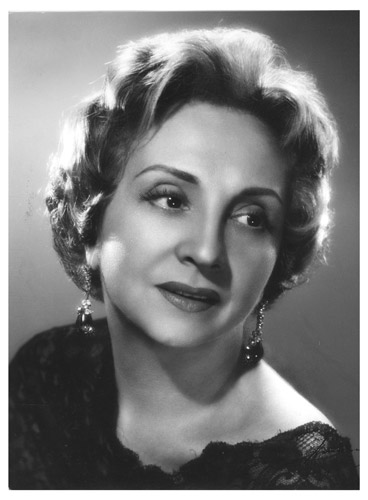
Iris Marga by Annemarie Heinrich.

María Iris Elda Rosmunda Pauri Bonetti (Orvieto, Terni Province, Kingdom of Italy, 18 January 1901 - Buenos Aires, Argentina, 28 December 1997), better known by her stage name Iris Marga, was an Italian-born Argentine actress and vedette.

== Filmography ==
- L'amore necessario (1991)
- Miss Mary (1986)
- Los médicos (1978)
- Ufa con el sexo (inédita - 1968)
- ¡Al diablo con este cura! (1967)
- Hotel alojamiento (1966)
- El candidato (1959)
- Horas marcadas (1954)
- Los tres mosqueteros (1946)
- Viaje sin regreso (1946)
- Petróleo (1940)
