= State of Reality =

- Directed by: Alejandro Doria
- Written by: Jacobo Langsner, Alejandro Doria
- Starring: Luis Brandoni
- Cinematography: Miguel Rodríguez
- Edited by: Silvia Ripoll
- Music by: Silvio Rodríguez
- Release date: 1984
- Running time: 106 minute

State of Reality (Spanish: Darse cuenta) is a 1984 Argentine historical drama film directed by Alejandro Doria and starring Luis Brandoni, Darío Grandinetti and Lito Cruz. The film won the 1985 Silver Condor Awards for Best Film, Best Director, Best Original Screenplay and Best Supporting Actress (China Zorrilla).

== Plot ==
During the final years of the dark period of the last civic-military dictatorship and the Falklands War, a young man (Darío Grandinetti) suffers a car accident and is transferred to a public hospital (Muñiz Hospital). In a coma and with severe spinal injuries, the medical professionals believe he has little chance of surviving with dignity, and he is practically abandoned in that state by his family, partner, and friends. However, a stubborn, compassionate, and principled doctor (Luis Brandoni) fights to save him, with the help of one of the nurses at the facility (China Zorrilla).

== Cast ==
- Luis Brandoni as Carlos Ventura
- Dora Baret as Delia
- Luisina Brando as Susana
- Lito Cruz as Marcelo
- Oscar Ferrigno as El Profesor
- María Vaner as Nora
- China Zorrilla as Águeda
- Darío Grandinetti as Juan
- Fernando Álvarez
- Clotilde Borella as pregnant mother
- Mónica Villa as Gladys
- Manuel Callau
- Juan Carlos Corazza
- Norberto Díaz
- Gabriela Flores
- Patricia Hart
- Jean Pierre Noher as lab technician
- Ruben Cosenza
- Jorge Marrale as Ferrero

== Reception ==
The film won the 1985 Silver Condor Awards for Best Film, Best Director, Best Original Screenplay and Best Supporting Actress (China Zorrilla). It also won the award for best actress (still Zorrilla) at the 1984 Havana Film Festival, the Honourable Special Prize at the 1985 Golden Rose Film Festival, and the Feature Film Audience Award at the 1985 Biarritz Film Festival. It was screened out of competition at the 36th Berlin International Film Festival.

The film is considered a metaphor of Argentine's return to democracy.
