= Las Muñecas que hacen ¡pum! =

Las Muñecas que hacen pum
- Release date: 1979
- Running time: 100 minute
- Country: Argentina
- Language: Spanish

Las Muñecas que hacen ¡pum! (The Dolls that go Boom!) is a 1979 Argentine film directed by Gerardo Sofovich. The plot concerns two rival international organisations, one of which employs androids used as sex dolls. The dolls are programmed to explode when the victim has sex with them.

== Reception ==
The film was released in an era when there was little sexual censorship of comedies in Argentina. Complaints were largely absent despite it being heavily advertised. However, in neighbouring Peru, there were street protests against the film leading to its banning as a "moral danger" to children.

The film was criticised by socialists for acting as an apologist for the military dictatorship, as was Sofovich in general.
