= Alejandro Doria =

Film director (1936–2009)

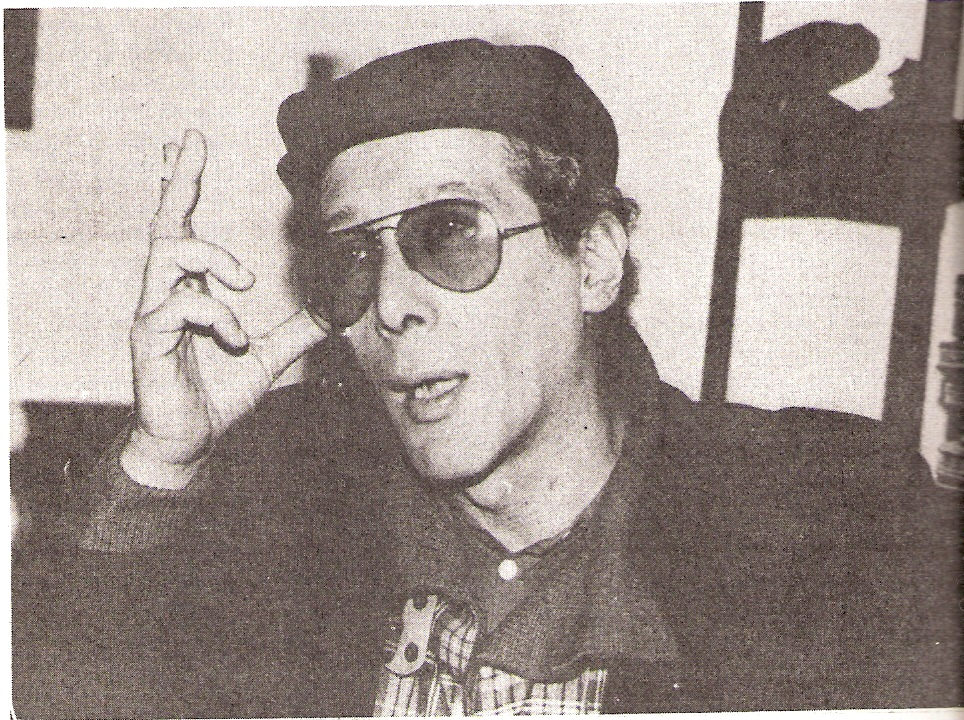
- Born: 1 November 1936; Buenos Aires, Argentina
- Died: 17 June 2009 (aged 72); Buenos Aires, Argentina
- Occupations: Film director, screenwriter
- Years active: 1965-2006

Alejandro Doria (November 1, 1936 – June 17, 2009) was a noted Argentine cinema and television director.

== Life and work ==
Born in Buenos Aires on November 1, 1936, Alejandro Doria first worked for Argentine television in 1965 as a writer for a local variety show, Show rambler.

He first directed professionally for Adorable Professor Aldao, a 1968 romantic comedy series. Doria's contract to direct the 1969 season of a top-rated sitcom, Nuestra galleguita (Our Galician Girl), secured his career in Argentine /television, and he directed numerous series during the early 1970s and was a guest producer several times for Alta Comedia, a comedy showcase.

Doria first directed for the cinema in 1974. The political satire by José Dominiani, Proceso a la infamia (Infamy on Trial), ran afoul of the newly appointed National Film Rater, Miguel Paulino Tato, however. Unable to work professionally for four years, Doria obtained his film's release in 1978, though the new, heavily edited version was panned by its audiences and director, alike. In demand following his long absence, Doria directed two thrillers in 1979: a film adaptation of Marco Denevi's Contragolpe (Retribution), and of Aída Bortnik's La isla. Collaborating with Bortnik on La isla's screenplay, the psychological thriller earned Doria a special mention at the Montreal World Film Festival. He wrote and directed one of the few well-known horror titles in Argentine film, Los miedos (Fears), in 1980, and in 1982, directed a film adaptation of Silvina Bullrich's best-selling Los Pasajeros del jardín (Wanderers in the Garden) - Bullrich's nostalgic, autobiographical look at her happy and all-too-brief second marriage.

The return of democracy in Argentina in 1983 was accompanied by a revival in local film and theatre production. Doria and Uruguayan screenwriter Jacobo Langsner wrote a script based on a concept created by another Uruguayan artist, veteran leading lady China Zorrilla. Their drama, Darse cuenta (Realization), was a critical and commercial success in 1984.

Doria and Langsner were then reunited for the making of Esperando la carroza (Waiting for the Hearse). The 1985 black comedy looked at a typical Argentine family and their struggles with each other and their mischievous, nonagenarian matriarch. The film became a cult classic, though another director's sequel written by Langsner and released in 2009 was unsuccessful.

Doria and Langsner then turned to recent history in Argentina with Sofia. The 1987 tragedy dealt with a chance encounter and a May–December love affair amid the oppressive Dirty War against dissidents. The harrowing portrayal, however, received little notice. Doria returned to the family comedy genre in 1990 with Cien veces no debo (I Don't Owe 100 Times Over) - a comedy of errors revolving around bad news for a neurotic, middle-class family. Doria then returned to television, directing a number of soap operas and a segment in an episodic homage to the victims of the 1994 AMIA bombing (the worst terrorist attack in Argentine history).

His reputation as a leading filmmaker in Argentine cinema was restored with the 2006 release of Los manos (The Hands) a bio-pic on the life of Father Mario Pantaleo, an Argentine priest who incurred the Vatican's wrath following reports he possessed healing hands. The drama earned numerous prizes in Argentina and in prestigious international film festivals, notably the Huelva Latin American Film Festival and Cartagena Film Festival. Doria more recently directed Doce horas (12 Hours) and Tuya (Yours), titles scheduled for release in 2010. Pneumonia cost the filmmaker his life on June 17, 2009, however, at age 72.

== Filmography ==
- Proceso a la infamia - 1974
- Contragolpe - 1979
- The Island (La Isla) - 1979
- Fears (Los Miedos) - 1980
- Los Pasajeros del jardín - 1982
- State of Reality (Darse cuenta) - 1984
- Waiting for the Hearse (Esperando la carroza) - 1985
- Sofía - 1987
- I Don't Owe 100 Times (Cien veces no debo) - 1990
- 18-J - 2004
- The Hands (Los manos) - 2006
