= List of Argentine films of 1986 =

A list of films produced in Argentina in 1986:

== 1986 ==
Title	Director	Actors	Genre	Notes
1986
Bad Company		Federico Luppi		
Amazons	Alejandro Sessa		Fantasy Epic	
Los amores de Laurita		Victor Laplace; Alberto Fernández de Rosa	Drama	
Las aventuras de Tremendo				
Brigada explosiva	Enrique Dawi	Moria Casán, Emilio Disi	Kids	
Brigada explosiva contra los ninjas				
Correccional de mujeres				
Cuidado, hombres trabajando				
Diapasón				
Las colegialas				
Chechechela, una chica de barrio				
Camarero nocturno en Mar del Plata				
El día que me quieras				
Los colimbas se divierten				
Pobre mariposa	Raúl de la Torre			Entered into the 1986 Cannes Film Festival
La película del rey				
La noche de los lápices	Héctor Olivera	Alejo García Pintos, Vita Escardó, Pablo Novak, Adriana Salonia	Political drama	Entered into the 15th Moscow International Film Festival
Pinocho				
Gerónima'				
Vivir a los 17				
La Historia en la arena				
Hombre mirando al sudeste				
El hombre que ganó la razón				
Los insomnes				
Rambito y Rambón primera misión				
La república perdida II				
La mayoría silenciada	Jorge Zuhair Jury	Rodolfo Ranni, Ana María Picchio, Estela Molly, Juan José Camero, Carlos Usay	Drama	
Las minas de Salomón Rey				
Mingo y Aníbal en la mansión embrujada				
En busca del brillante perdido				
La Era del ñandú				

== External links and references ==
- Argentine films of 1986 at the Internet Movie Database
