= List of Argentine films of 1972 =

A list of films produced in Argentina in 1972:

Argentine films of 1972
Title	Director	Release	Genre
A–F
Argentinísima	Fernando Ayala and Héctor Olivera	8 June	
Autocine mon amour	Fernando Siro	5 October	
La bastarda	Emilio Gómez Muriel	7 September	
La colimba no es la guerra	Jorge Mobaied	6 July	
¿De quiénes son las mujeres?	Catrano Catrani	18 May	
Destino de un capricho	Leo Fleider	31 August	
Disputas en la cama	Mario David	11 May	
Estoy hecho un demonio	Hugo Moser	4 May	
Fiebre	Armando Bó	22 June	
G–N
Había una vez un circo	Enrique Carreras	17 August	
He nacido en la ribera	Catrano Catrani	19 August	
Heroína	Raúl de la Torre	29 June	
Juan Manuel de Rosas	Manuel Antín	16 March	
Laberinto	Nino Zanchin	22 December	
La maffia	Leopoldo Torre Nilsson	29 March	
Me enamoré sin darme cuenta	Fernando Siro	10 August	
Mi amigo Luis	Carlos Rinaldi	6 April	
Mi hijo Ceferino Namuncurá	Jorge Mobaied	13 April	
Nino	Federico Curiel	27 April	
¿Ni vencedores ni vencidos?	Naum Spoliansky and Alberto Cabado	27 July	
O–Z
Olga, la hija de aquella princesa rusa	Diego Santillán	3 August	
La pandilla inolvidable	Máximo Berrondo	29 June	
El picnic de los Campanelli	Enrique Carreras	13 July	
Las píldoras	Enrique Cahen Salaberry	3 August	
Piloto de pruebas	Leo Fleider	23 March	
El Profesor Tirabombas	Fernando Ayala	7 September	
Salvar la cara	Edward Ross	21 December	
La sartén por el mango	Manuel Antín	5 October	
Simplemente María	Enzo Bellomo	25 May	
La sonrisa de mamá	Enrique Carreras	2 March	
Todos los pecados del mundo	Emilio Gómez Muriel	9 March	
Los Velázquez			

== External links and references ==
- Argentine films of 1972 at the Internet Movie Database
