= José Andrada =

Argentine actor (1938–2025)

José Manuel Andrada Márquez (20 July 1938 – 1 October 2025) was an Argentine actor. He had roles in Los Velázquez, Johny Tolengo, el majestuoso, and Two to Tango.

Andrada was born in Buenos Aires on 20 July 1938 and made his theatre debut in the 1970s. In 2010, he received the Premio Podestá in recognition of his career

He died on 1 October 2025, at the age of 87.

== Partial filmography ==
- 2011: Lugares de encuentro (short film)
- 2007: El cuervo (short film)
- 2005: Mañana (short film)
- 2004: Mi Argentina privada (short film)
- 2003: Ojos
- 2001: I love you... Torito
- 1993: Funes, un gran amor
- 1991: Después de la tormenta
- 1989: La amiga
- 1988: Matar es morir un poco
- 1987: Las esclavas
- 1987: Sofía
- 1987: Johnny Tolengo, el majestuoso
- 1986: Perros de la noche
- 1986: Correccional de mujeres
- 1986: La noche de los lápices
- 1986: Pobre mariposa
- 1985: Esperando la carroza
- 1985: Bairoletto, la aventura de un rebelde
- 1985: Flores robadas en los jardines de Quilmes
- 1985: Los días de junio
- 1984: Noches sin lunas ni soles
- 1984: Los chicos de la guerra
- 1972: Los Velázquez
