= Disputas en la cama =

- Film poster
- Directed by: Mario David
- Written by: Mario David, Alejandro Faccio
- Produced by: Rafael Cohen
- Cinematography: Arsenio Reinaldo Pica
- Edited by: Oscar Pariso
- Music by: Alberto Núñez Palacios
- Release date: 11 May 1972
- Running time: 85 minutes
- Country: Argentina
- Language: Spanish

Disputas en la cama (Disputes in the Bed), also known as Los divorciados, is a 1972 Argentine sex comedy film directed by Mario David. It stars Tato Bores, Norman Briski, Zulma Faiad, Víctor Laplace and Soledad Silveyra. A preview function with 250 guests for the film was suspended by the Qualification Body, which objected to scenes with Soledad Silveyra and Alejandra Romanof. Upon release on 11 May 1972, the film was largely panned by critics but was a box office success.

== Plot ==
The film consists of a series of sketches on the themes of infidelity, sexuality and divorce. In one scene, a man dons a long beard and impresses an attractive female sunbather at a local park and later spies on a woman in the shower. A man fails miserably at a yoga class full of women.

A man orders seafood at a restaurant, hoping that it will prove to be an aphrodisiac. Unfortunately is advances towards his partner in his car are disturbed by a gunman. When a child is born Japanese, he looks for a would-be father.

Later, a couple arrive at the solicitors office requesting a divorce. Another man, a museum curator, has an unhealthy habit of discussing his paintings as a means of seducing young women.

== Cast ==
- Tato Bores
- Norman Briski
- Zulma Faiad
- Víctor Laplace
- Soledad Silveyra
- Henny Trailes
- Oscar Viale
- Gloria Guzmán
- Gogó Andreu
- Lydia Lamaison
- Alexandra Romanof
- Héctor Malamud

== Production ==
The film was Mario David's second picture and a stark contrast to his debut drama El Ayudante, succumbing to trends in commercial production for sex comedies, according to one publication. The film was produced by Rafael Cohen, and the screenplay was written by the director Mario David, working with Alejandro Faccio. Cinematographer Arsenio Reinaldo Pica was hired to shoot the film. Alberto Núñez Palacios composed the soundtrack. The film's editing was done by Oscar Pariso.

== Release and reception ==
Disputas en la cama premiered on 11 May 1972 in Buenos Aires. It was also referred to as Los Divorciados. The film was successful at the box office, though, controversially, a preview function with 250 guests was suspended by the Qualification Body, which objected to scenes with Soledad Silveyra and Alejandra Romanof. The film was largely panned by the critics at the time, with Gente declaring that it "serves to describe something that is worse than worse" and is an "absolute waste of actors and situations", and La Razón labelling it a "Picaresque comedy without subtleties". It has since gained favour, with Ricardo Manetti in his book Cine argentino: modernidad y vanguardias, 1957/1983 describing the critical reaction to have been a "somewhat exaggerated criticism, because the visual richness is great".

== See also ==
- List of Argentine films of 1972
