= List of Argentine films of 1973 =

A list of films produced in Argentina in 1973:

Argentine films of 1973
Title	Director	Release	Genre
A - E
Adiós Alejandra	Carlos Rinaldi	19 April	
Allá en el norte	Julio Saraceni	19 April	
Andrea	Carlos Rinaldi	4 October	
Argentinísima II	Fernando Ayala and Héctor Olivera	21 June	
Las Aventuras de Hijitus	Manuel García Ferré	12 September	Animated
Los caballeros de la cama redonda	Gerardo Sofovich	22 March	
El cabo Tijereta	Jorge Mobaied	18 October	
La casa del amor	Aldo Brunelli Ventura	27 September	
El deseo de vivir	Julio Saraceni	5 April	
Los Doctores las prefieren desnudas	Gerardo Sofovich	13 September	
Este loco... loco Buenos Aires	Fernando Siro		
F - J
Furia infernal	Armando Bó	30 August	
Hasta que se ponga el sol	Aníbal E. Uset	8 February	
Hipólito y Evita	Orestes A. Trucco	30 August	
¡Hola Señor León!	Mario Sábato	6 September	
La hora de los hornos	Fernando Solanas	1 November	
Hoy le toca a mi mujer	Enrique Carreras	6 September	
Informes y testimonios	Diego Eijo (h), Eduardo Giorello, Ricardo Moretti, Alfredo O. Oroz, Carlos Vallina and Silvia Vega	29 August	
José María y María José (Una pareja de hoy)	Rodolfo Costamagna	9 August	
Juan Moreira	Leonardo Favio	24 May	
Juegos de verano	Juan Antonio Serna	18 April	
K - Q
Luces de mis zapatos	Luis Puenzo	19 July	
La malavida	Hugo Fregonese	28 June	
Me gusta esa chica	Enrique Carreras	29 March	
El Mundo que inventamos	Fernando Siro	22 February	
Operación Masacre	Jorge Cedrón	27 September	
Los padrinos	Enrique Carreras	5 July	
Paño verde	Mario David	1 March	
La piel del amor	Mario David	26 July	
Poker de amantes para tres	Carlos Dimitriadis	19 July	
¡Quiero besarlo Señor!	Hugo Moser	2 August	
R - Z
La revolución	Raúl de la Torre	26 April	
Los siete locos	Leopoldo Torre Nilsson	3 May	
Siempre fuimos compañeros	Fernando Siro	7 June	
Si se calla el cantor	Enrique Dawi	15 March	
Tercer mundo	Ángel Acciaresi	2 August	
Titanes en el ring	Leo Fleider	4 January	
Vení conmigo	Luis Saslavsky	8 November	
Las venganzas de Beto Sánchez	Héctor Olivera	23 August	
Venus perseguida	Aldo Brunelli Ventura	2 April	
Yo gané el prode... y Ud.?	Emilio Vieyra	28 June	

== External links and references ==
- Argentine films of 1973 at the Internet Movie Database
