= Ana María Shua =

Argentine writer (born 1951)

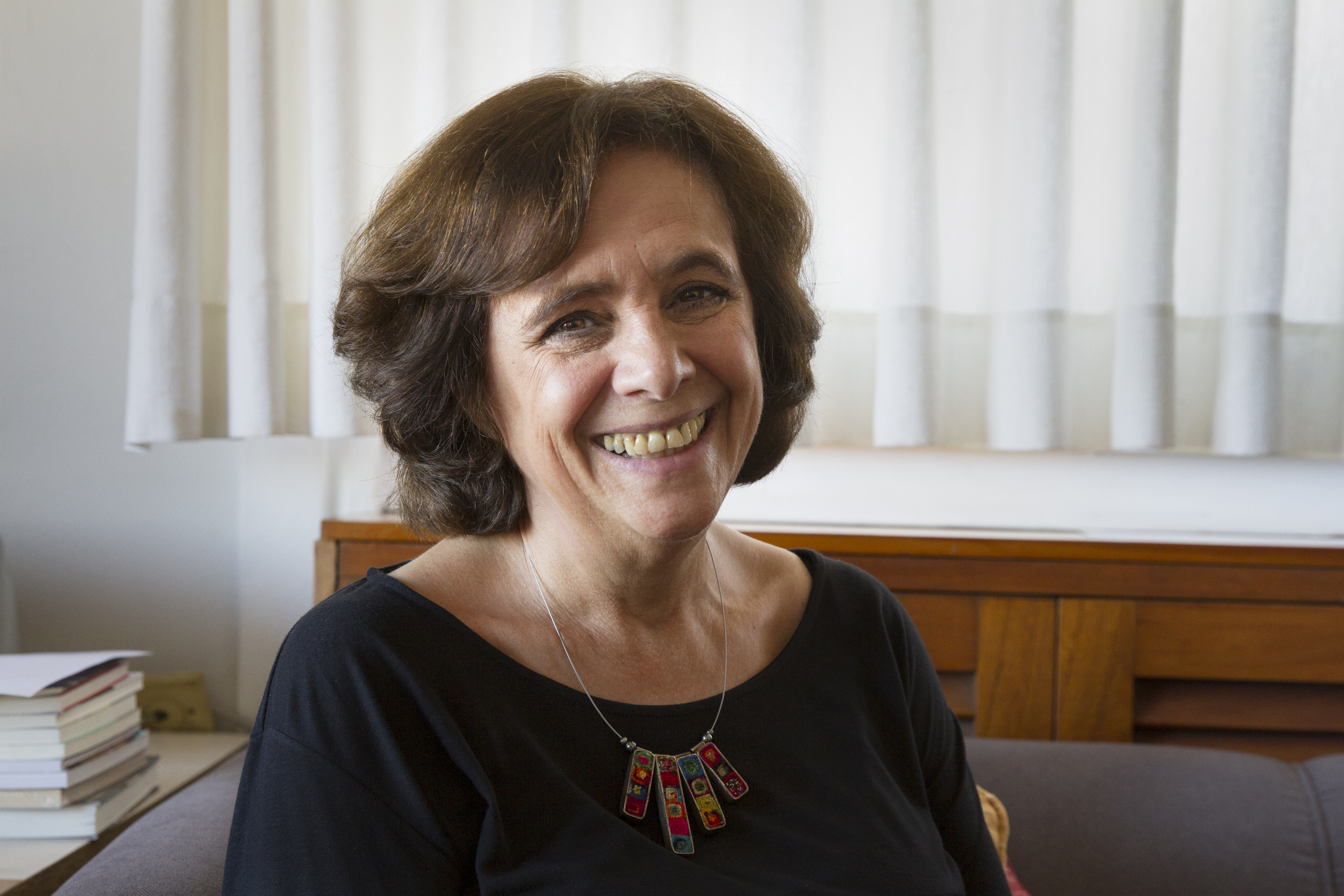
- Born: Ana María Schoua; April 22, 1951 (age 75); Buenos Aires, Argentina
- Education: University of Buenos Aires
- Occupations: Writer, illustrator
- Spouse: Silvio Fabrykant
- Children: Gabriela Fabrykant; Paloma Fabrykant; Vera Fabrykant
- Writing career
- Genre: Fiction
- Notable awards: Guggenheim Fellowship

Ana María Shua (born 22 April 1951) is an Argentine writer. She is particularly well known for her work in microfiction.

Shua has published over eighty books in numerous genres including novels, short stories, microfiction, poetry, drama, children's literature, books of humor and Jewish folklore, anthologies, film scripts, journalistic articles, and essays. She has received numerous national and international awards, including a Guggenheim Fellowship, and is one of Argentina's premier living writers.

She has been referred to as the "Queen of the Micro-Story" in the world of Spanish-language literature.

== Career ==
=== Early life and education ===
Born Ana María Schoua (the original spelling for her surname) in Buenos Aires in 1951, Shua became interested in writing at a young age, inspired by books such as Black Beauty. She published her first book on poetry, El sol y yo, in 1967 when she was only a sixteen-year-old student at the Colegio Nacional de Buenos Aires, having won a prize from the Fondo Nacional de las Artes that paid for the printing of 1,000 copies. The collection won the "Faja de Honor" award given by the Argentine Society of Writers.

Shua studied at the University of Buenos Aires and obtained a degree in education, specializing in literature.

=== Exile ===
During the last military dictatorship in Argentina, often called the National Reorganization Process, Shua took a boat to Europe and went into exile in France, part of a wave of exiled political figures and intellectuals. Her sister and her two cousins were also exiled. She lived in Paris from 1976 to 1977, working for the Spanish magazine Cambio 16.

=== Return to Argentina and literary success ===
Once back in Argentina, Shua published her first novel: Soy paciente, released in 1980, for which she won an award given by the Losada publishing house. The book is often read as a metaphor for the military dictatorship, which was still in power at the time.

The following year she published her first short-story collection, Los días de pesca, followed in 1984 by her first commercial success, the novel Los amores de Laurita. That same year, she published La sueñera, her first collection of microfiction—the extremely short stories that would become her signature, also sometimes known in English as "flash fiction." Shua had been working on La sueñera for 10 years before it was published.

Since then, she has published the works of microfiction Casa de Geishas, Botánica del caos, Temporada de fantasmas, Cazadores de letras (a compilation that includes her first four microfiction collections), and Fenómenos de circo. In explaining her affection for the genre, Shua has said:

"I really like to feel that I am inside a text in which every word is essential, in which rhythm and sound are as important as meaning and cannot be separated."

She has also described the super-short format as requiring authors "to work with the knowledge of the reader, like in martial arts, where you take advantage of the force of your opponent."

In 1994, she was granted a Guggenheim Fellowship to write her novel El libro de los recuerdos, which tells the story of a Jewish family in Argentina, somewhat based on her own family's history.

Shua has worked as a journalist, a publicist, and a screenwriter, adapting some of her writings, including Los amores de Laurita, directed by Antonio Ottone. She also co-wrote the script for the Juan José Jusid's film Where Are You My Love, That I Cannot Find You? Shua has also written books for children and works of humor and folklore, including El pueblo de los tontos, the first Spanish-language telling of the traditional Jewish Chełm stories.

A complete collection of her stories was published in 2009 under the title Que tengas una vida interesante, and an English translation of some of her stories was published the same year under the title Microfictions. Other English translations include The Book of Memories, Quick Fix, and Circus Freaks.

== Awards and recognition ==
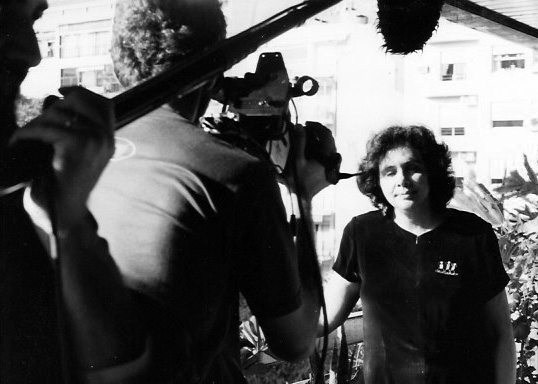
Ana María Shua being interviewed for the documentary film En el nombre del padre.

Among Shua's honors include her two awards for El sol y yo, her award for Soy paciente, and the Guggenheim Fellowship. She also received honors from the Banco del Libro and International Board on Books for Young People for her children's book La fábrica del terror, and first place in the stories category for her book Fenómenos de circo from the Argentine Ministry of Culture.

Her 1997 novel La muerte como efecto secundario was included on the International Congress of the Spanish Language's list of the 100 best Spanish novels of the quarter-century.

Shua was the recipient of the first Juan José Arreola Ibero-American Prize for Mini-Fiction in 2016.

== Personal life ==
Shua's parents were Jewish, of Polish and Lebanese origin, although her father was a militant atheist and she was raised largely without religion. But, Shua has said, "To be Jewish you don't have to study, nor believe, nor know anything in particular: it is not something that you choose," and Jewish themes have appeared occasionally in her work.

As a fiction writer, Shua has said she avoids reading nonfiction, including reviews and literary criticism of her own work.

She is married to the architect and photographer Silvio Fabrykant, whom she wed in 1975. The couple has three children: Gabriela, Vera, and Paloma Fabrykant.

== Works ==
=== Novels ===
- Soy paciente (translated as Patient, 1980)
- Los amores de Laurita (1984)
- El libro de los recuerdos (The Book of Memories, 1994)
- La muerte como efecto secundario (Death as a Side Effect, 1997)
- El peso de la tentación (2007)
- Nemo (2003)

=== Short story collections ===
- Los días de pesca (1981)
- Viajando se conoce gente (1988)
- Como una buena madre (2001)
- Historias verdaderas (2004)
- Los devoradores (2005)

=== Microfiction collections ===
- La sueñera (1984)
- Casa de geishas (1992)
- Botánica del caos (2000)
- Temporada de fantasmas (Ghost Season, 2004)
- Quick fix (2008)
- Cazadores de Letras (2009)
- Microfictions (2009)
- Fenómenos de circo (Circus Freaks, 2011)

=== Children's books ===
- La batalla de los elefantes y los cocodrilos (1988)
- La fábrica del terror (1991)
- La puerta para salir del mundo (1992)
- Cuentos judíos con fantasmas y demonios (1994)
- Ani salva a la perra Laika (1996)
- Historia de un cuento (1998)
- Cuentos con magia (1999)
- La luz mala (2000)
- Los monstruos del Riachuelo (2001)
- Planeta miedo (2002)
- Su primera zanahoria (2005)
- Un ciervo muy famoso (2005)

=== Humorous fiction ===
- El marido argentino promedio (1991)
- Risas y emociones en la cocina judía (2003)

=== Poetry collections ===
- El sol y yo (1967)

=== Movie scripts ===
- Soy paciente (1986)
- Los amores de Laurita (1986)
- ¿Dónde estás amor de mi vida que no te puedo encontrar? (1992)

=== Documentary ===
- En el nombre del padre. Contrakultura Films, 2002. Produced by Eduardo Montes-Bradley
