= Max Berliner =

Polish-Argentine actor, author, film director, and theater director (1919–2019)

Max Berliner (Yiddish: מאקס בערלינער, born Mordcha Berliner; Warsaw, 23 October 1919 - Buenos Aires, 26 August 2019) was a Polish-Argentine actor, author, film director and theater director.

== Filmography ==
- El profesor tirabombas (1972)
- Las venganzas de Beto Sánchez(1973)
- La flor de la mafia (1974)
- La Patagonia rebelde (1974)
- Minguito Tinguitela Papá (1974)
- Los gauchos judíos (1974)
- El muerto (1975)
- El casamiento de Laucha (1977)
- El Gordo catástrofe (1977)
- Las locuras del profesor (1979)
- …Y mañana serán hombres (1979)
- La nona (1979)
- Millonarios a la fuerza (1979)
- Custodio de señoras (1979)
- Mis días con Verónica (1979)
- Comandos azules (1980)
- Los crápulas (1981)
- Plata dulce (1982)
- Pubis angelical (1982)
- El desquite (1983)
- Los enemigos (1983)
- Pasajeros de una pesadilla (1984)
- En retirada (1984)
- Los tigres de la memoria (1984)
- Las barras bravas (1985)
- Tacos altos (1985)
- La cruz invertida (1985)
- Los superagentes contra los fantasmas (1986)
- Susana quiere, el negro también! (1987)
- Después de ayer (1987)
- Paraíso Relax (Casa de masajes) (1988)
- Billetes, billetes... (1988)
- Apartment Zero (1989)
- Después de ayer (1989)
- La amiga (1989)
- Yo tenía un plazo fijo (1990)
- Highlander II: The Quickening (1991)
- La casa de Tourneur (1997)
- Yepeto (1999)
- Cóndor Crux (1999, voz)
- Ángel, la diva y yo (1999)
- Un amor en Moisés Ville (2000)
- 18-J (2004)
- Seres queridos (2004)
- El deseo de Domingo (2016)
- El último traje (2018)

== Television ==
- Otra vez Drácula (1970)
- El pulpo negro (1985)
- Pelito (1986)
- Amigos son los amigos
- La estación de Landriscina (1992)
- Poliladron (1995)
- Como pan caliente (1996)
- Chiquititas (1996) Romualdo
- Gasoleros (1998)
- Chiquititas (1998)
- Chiquititas (1999) Pancho
- Chiquititas (2000) Méntor
- Tumberos (2002)
- Disputas (2003)
- Doble vida (2005)
- Casados con hijos (2006)
- Hermanos y detectives (2006)
- Botineras (2010)
- Malparida (2010)
- Graduados (2012)
