= El amor infiel =

1974 film

- Film poster
- Directed by: Mario David
- Written by: Mario David
- Produced by: Hugo Flesc
- Starring: Zulma Faiad, Arturo Puig, Elena Sedova, Antonio Grimau
- Cinematography: Adelqui Camuso
- Edited by: Oscar Pariso
- Music by: Víctor Proncet
- Production company: Inca Producciones
- Distributed by: Transocean
- Release date: 22 August 1974
- Running time: 75 minutes
- Country: Argentina
- Language: Spanish

El amor infiel is a 1974 Argentine romantic drama film directed by Mario David, who also wrote the script, which is based on a novel by María Angélica Bosco. It stars Zulma Faiad, Arturo Puig, Elena Sedova and Antonio Grimau. Víctor Proncet composed the soundtrack.

== Plot ==
The film begins with a card game, followed by a man wooing an attractive blonde at the casino. A romance blossoms but infidelities kick in.

== Cast ==
- Zulma Faiad as Corina
- Arturo Puig as Esteban
- Elena Sedova as Julia
- Antonio Grimau as Marcerlo
- Elizabeth Makar as Silvia

== Production ==
The film was produced by executive producer Hugo Flesc. The screenplay was written by the director Mario David, which is based on a novel by María Angélica Bosco. Cinematographer Adelqui Camuso was hired to shoot the film. Víctor Proncet composed the soundtrack, while the editing was done by Oscar Pariso.

== Reception ==
The film premiered on 22 August 1974 in Buenos Aires. It was poorly received by critics, with La Nación describing it as a "Tedious history of infidelities… A long and slow comment on the inconsistency of unfaithful love". El Cronista Comercial remarked that there was "total inconsistency", while La Razón stated that "most of the development of the film is summarized in the image of Puig driving his car".

== See also ==
- List of Argentine films of 1974
