= Paloma Fabrykant =

Argentinian journalist

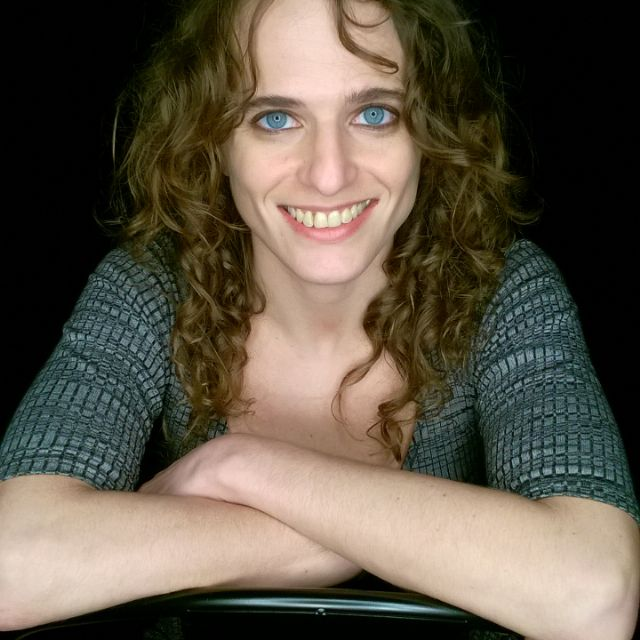
- Born: December 7, 1981 (age 44); Buenos Aires, Argentina
- Nationality: (Argentina) Argentine
- Height: 5 ft 7 in (1.70 m)
- Weight: 125 lb (57 kg; 8.9 st)
- Division: Flyweight
- Reach: 70.0 in (178 cm)
- Style: Karate
- Stance: Southpaw
- Rank: black belt in Karate purple belt in Brazilian jiu-jitsu
- Years active: 2012-

Mixed martial arts record
- Total: 6
- Wins: 4
- By knockout: 2
- By submission: 2
- Losses: 2
- By submission: 1
- By decision: 1

Other information
- University: University of Buenos Aires
- Notable relatives: Ana María Shua (mother)
- Notable school: Colegio Nacional de Buenos Aires
- Website: palo-mma.com
- Mixed martial arts record from Sherdog

Paloma Fabrykant (born 7 December 1981) is an Argentine mixed martial artist and journalist, based in Buenos Aires, Argentina.

== Background ==
Fabrykant is from Buenos Aires she is the daughter of famous Argentine author Ana María Shua and photographer Silvio Fabrykant. Whilst attending Colegio Nacional de Buenos Aires Paloma Fabrykant began martial arts training at 13 practising judo and aikido, she began her career as a professional writer, publishing her first two books before her teens (Things I hate, Ed. Abundant spring, 1998 and as mother of a teenage daughter, written by a teenage daughter, Ed. Planeta, 2001).

Her early talent for writing soon came to journalism, and while she was studying at the Faculty of Letters and Philosophy of the University of Buenos Aires, chronic wrote for the supplement of Clarin. At twenty years old she had her own regular column in Live, Sunday magazine of the same newspaper, and discovered the Karate, art was her greatest love ever since. But she failed to unite these two passions: journalism and martial arts. It was then that she met the kickboxer Jorge Acero Cali and started working as his press chief. As her client was gaining fame Fabrykant wrote for various media publications such as (Clarin, Pagina 12, Télam), a new form of struggle was growing at a rapid pace, threatening the reign of Kickboxing between combat sports. It was the mixed martial arts sport Fabrykant sponsored from the outset, advocating clean your -negative image in a principle-both in writing and on television (surcharge Radar, Live Journal, Telefe Noticias, Canal 26).

In an interview with Red Marcial stated..

in early 2000 I started doing Taebo and at the same gym doing kickboxing. Then I tried karate, martial art was the thing I needed, and I was fascinated. Because I realized that you can learn beyond linguistic experience. In karate you learn through bodily sensations, postures, through fatigue itself and overcoming fears. It was the antithesis of education she had. In fact, I left college, I felt that life was passing me and I was instructing from the academic intellectual life, which is already dominated. My parents cared so much I went to college, they are from another generation. But they accepted it, they are very liberal.

== MMA Journalism ==
In 2007 Paloma Fabrykant decided to take the big step: what better to spread the MMA to make her debut in the cage on TV. The "Vale Todo" program segment Chronicles Extreme, America 2 channel, devised, produced and starred Paloma was the first time the MMA appeared on broadcast TV in Argentina. The rating accompanied the news and came away. While she was in Thailand started training Muay Thai, The Department of Productions in Spanish UFC was alerted about her work, and when she returned to Buenos Aires, Paloma found a surprise: an invitation to Las Vegas to attend a UFC event and talk about possible collaborations.

Since 2008 worked as a correspondent for Fabrykant UFC, travelling Latin America and writing weekly reports on the progress of MMA in each country. At the same time she started working as a manager for, leading Argentine athletes, Uruguayans, Paraguayans, Peruvians and Costa Rica to compete in international events. Also in that year the practice of Jujitsu, studying art since at Gracie school found indispensable. In 2010, the Space channel decided to begin broadcasting MMA Fabrykant for Latin America and the reporter was chosen for the specialized comments.

Paloma Fabrykant is currently a sports commentator for Fox Sports Latinoamérica and has been for the last 7 years in Argentina and a columnist for Télam.

== Mixed martial arts career ==
Fabrykant started her mixed martial arts career in 2012 at the age of 30, by defeating Constanza Zoilo . She next defeated Cintia Candela Faria. She won her first four fights, before losing to Gloria Castillo.

== Mixed martial arts record ==
Professional record breakdown
6 matches	4 wins	2 losses
By knockout	2	0
By submission	2	1
By decision	0	1

Res.	Record	Opponent	Method	Event	Date	Round	Time	Location	Notes
Loss	4–2	Flor Fonseca	Decision (Split)	Heroes - MMA 4	May 12, 2014	3	5:00	Argentina	
Loss	4–1	Gloria Castillo	Technical Submission (Armbar)	AMMA - Arrogant MMA	October 20, 2013	1	0:53	Buenos Aires, Argentina	
Win	4–0	Denise Boifer	Submission (Rear-Naked Choke)	Heroes - MMA 2	September 23, 2013	1		Argentina	
Win	3–0	Silvana Peralta	Submission (Armbar)	MRWF - Mixed Real World Fighters 1	April 20, 2013	1	1:15	Santa Cruz, Argentina	
Win	2–0	Cintia Candela Faria	TKO (Punches)	KOCP - Knock Out Club Productions	December 7, 2012	1	3:50	Gualeguaychu, Argentina	
Win	1–0	Constanza Zoilo	TKO (Punches)	GEF - Gualeguaychu Extreme Fights	February 27, 2012	2	1:59	Gualeguaychu, Argentina	

== See also ==
- Lists of writers
