= Letters from Mom =

- Short story by Julio Cortázar
- Genre: Ghost story

Publication
- Publisher: Editorial Sudamerica
- Publication date: 1958
- Pages: 58

"Letters from Mom" (Spanish: "Cartas de mamá") is a work of short fiction by Julio Cortázar first collected in Las Armas secreta (Secret Weapons) and published by Editorial Sudamericana, Buenos Aires, in 1958.

The story debuted in English in 2022 published by Sublunary Editions, translated by Magdalena Edwards.

“Letters from Mom” was adapted to film by Argentine screenwriter and director Manuel Antin. Titled Odd Number (spanish La cifra impar), the 1962 film features Lautaro Murúa, María Rosa Gallo and Sergio Renán.

== Plot ==
“Letters from Mom” is presented from the third-person omniscient point-of-view. The story is set mostly in Paris.

Luis, an affluent Argentinian, lives in Buenos Aires. His brother, the artistic and sensitive Nicko, has tuberculosis, and is deeply in love with Laura. Luis decides to claim Laura for himself. Ignoring social norms, he arranges a quick civil wedding and absconds with Laura to Paris to escape the opprobrium he provokes from his family, especially his mother. Nicko, bereft of Laura, dies during their honeymoon. Luis insists his brother never be discussed. Luis and Laura are haunted by his memory, as is the mother, who ceasely writes to her expatriate son.

When a letter arrives from the mother informing Luis that Nicko is in France and will be arriving by train soon in Paris, Luis concludes that his aging mother is senile: Nicko, of course, is deceased. The letter, nonetheless, plunges Luis into uneasy self-loathing. He attempts to conceal the letter from Laura, but she discovers its contents. Both furtively attempt to discover if Nicko arrives at the train station.

== Retrospective appraisal ==
Literary critic Brendan Riley reports that the novella length “Letters from Mother”—a “ghost story”—was the only one of the five pieces in the 1958 Spanish language Las Armas secreta collection that did not appear in the 1963 English language volume End of the Game and Other Stories nor in the 1967 reprint issued under the title Blow-Up and Other Stories.

Written during his most productive period, “these stories, as Cortázar himself affirmed, discovered his métier and began to mature as a writer of fiction.”

== Sources ==
- Cortázar, Julio. 2022. Letters from Mom. Sublunary Editions. ISBN 978-1955190206
- Stavans, Ilan. 1996. Julio Cortázar: A Study of the Short Fiction. Twayne’s Studies in Short Fiction, Gordon Weaver, general editor. Twayne Publishers, New York. ISBN 0-8057-8293-1
- Riley, Brenda]. 2022. “Living Like a Word Between Parentheses”: On Julio Cortázar’s “Letters from Mom.” Los Angeles Review of Books, April 3, 2022. https://lareviewofbooks.org/article/living-like-a-word-between-parentheses-on-julio-cortazars-letters-from-mom/ Accessed 02 December, 2025.
- Walsh, David. 2002. “Changed conditions and some of the same problems.” Buenos Aires 4th International Festival of Independent Cinema—Part 1. World Socialist Web Site, May 15, 2002. https://www.wsws.org/en/articles/2002/05/baff-m15.html Accessed 02 November, 2025.
