= Heroine (1972 film) =

Heroína
- Directed by: Raúl de la Torre
- Starring: Graciela Borges; Pepe Soriano; Lautaro Murúa; María Vaner
- Release date: 1972
- Running time: 110 minute
- Country: Argentina
- Language: Spanish

Heroína is a 1972 Argentine film directed by Raúl de la Torre and starring Graciela Borges, Pepe Soriano, Lautaro Murúa, and María Vaner. The film sold over 78,000 tickets in the first week of release.

== Plot ==
Peny, a 26-year-old translator struggling with her mental health, finds herself drawn into a tumultuous relationship with Javier González, a charming doctor from Puerto Rico she meets during a psychology conference held in Buenos Aires. As their connection deepens, Peny's past traumas resurface, leading to a breakdown and a subsequent diagnosis of schizophrenia. Confronted with the challenges of her condition, Peny is forced to confront her demons and seek help. A surprising letter from González offers her a lifeline and the possibility of healing.

== Cast ==
- Graciela Borges as Penny Crespo, a young translator who is undergoing psychoanalysis.
- Pepe Soriano
- Lautaro Murúa as Dr. Javier González
- María Vaner
