= Where Are You My Love, That I Cannot Find You? =

- Directed by: Juan José Jusid
- Written by: Juan José Jusid; Ana María Shua
- Produced by: Victor Canardo; Horacio Grinberg; Juan José Jusid; Isidro Miguel
- Starring: Susú Pecoraro; Oscar Martínez; Fernando Siro; Mario Pasik; Luisina Brando; Jessica Schultz
- Cinematography: Miguel Abal
- Edited by: Jorge Valencia
- Music by: Federico Jusid; Pocho Lapouble
- Release date: 6 August 1992
- Running time: 95 minutes
- Country: Argentina
- Language: Spanish

Where Are You My Love, That I Cannot Find You? (Spanish: ¿Dónde estás amor de mi vida que no te puedo encontrar?) is a 1992 Argentine drama film directed by Juan José Jusid and co-written with Ana María Shua. The film stars Susú Pecoraro, Oscar Martínez, Fernando Siro, Luisina Brando, Mario Pasik and Jessica Schultz, as well as Vando Villamil in a small role.

== Synopsis ==
The film shows the encounters and romances of several characters who seek love counsel through the eponymous late-night radio talk-show, conducted by Octavio (Siro). Octavio sets up blind dates among the characters, mainly advising Sarah (Pecoraro), a thirty-something loner who is hooked up with Fernandez (Martínez), a shy, introverted man who still lives with his father. Their relationship is chronicled through a series of episodes, involving Martínez' affair with a spiritist (Schultz), Sarah's entanglement with a psychopath and a subplot involving Sarah's strong-willed but ultimately broken and suicidal friend, Tina (Brando).

Sarah, worn-out after so much frustrated relationships and hopeless cases, decides to kill herself and takes an overdose of sleeping pills. Martínez arrives just in time to get her to a hospital and save her, whereupon Octavio happily announces their engagement through the radio.
