= La Casa del amor =

La Casa del Amor may refer to:

- La casa del amor, a 1973 Argentinean film (see List of Argentine films of 1973)
- La Casa del Amor, a 1993 album by Mexican singer Erik Rubin
