= Odd Number (film) =

- Original 1962 theatrical release poster
- Directed by: Manuel Antín
- Written by: Manuel Antin; Julio Cortázar (short story); Antonio Ripoll
- Produced by: Carlos Borcosque Jr.; Axel Pauls
- Starring: Lautaro Murúa; María Rosa Gallo; Sergio Renán
- Cinematography: Ignacio Souto
- Edited by: Antonio Ripoll
- Music by: Virtú Maragno
- Production company: Harding-Schon Productions
- Release date: 15 November 1962
- Running time: 85 minutes
- Country: Argentina
- Language: Spanish

Odd Number (Spanish: La cifra impar) is a 1962 Argentine Gothic-mystery directed film by Manuel Antín and starring Lautaro Murúa, María Rosa Gallo and Sergio Renán. It is based on the short story, "Cartas de mamá" (Letters from Mother) by Julio Cortázar

== Cast ==
- Lautaro Murúa
- María Rosa Gallo
- Sergio Renán
- Milagros de la Vega
- Maurice Jouvet
- José María Fra

== Plot ==
The film contains a number of flashbacks.

Luis and Laura, a self-complacent and demoralized bourgeois couple living in Paris, are informed by Luis’s mother in Buenos Aires that his younger brother, Nicko, will soon be arriving in Europe. The letter cannot be taken seriously: Nicko has been dead for years, a victim of tuberculosis. The couple are aware that the sensitive and artistic young Nicko had once been deeply in love Laura when she left him for Luis. Nicko dies shortly after his brother and Laura arrange a hasty wedding and depart for France. The devastated younger brother issued a malediction to them shortly before he was found dead: “I’ll remain stuck to you all.”

Haunted by their betrayal of Nicko, Luis and Laura suspend their disbelief and independently seek to determine if the dead man will appear at the Paris train station. The couple discovers that Nicko’s presence becomes established in their lives and “impossible to exterminate.”

== Retrospective appraisal ==
Arts editor David Walsh in the World Socialist Web Site writes:

There are various sides to the story, including the purely psychological one. But there is more to it than that. The film, a rich, dark melodrama, is all atmosphere, tension, semi-Gothic overtone. Everything—including the décor, the furniture—speaks of the suffocating bourgeois existence these people live, a way of living that killed off the only one with sensitivity—but in reality failed to kill [Nicko] off. Some things are unkillable. La cifra impar contains as much protest and insight (and optimism, in a peculiar fashion) as any film I have seen in a long time.

== Sources ==
- Riley, Brendan. 2022. Julio Cortázar’s “Letters from Mom.” Los Angeles Review of Books, April 3, 2022. https://lareviewofbooks.org/article/living-like-a-word-between-parentheses-on-julio-cortazars-letters-from-mom/ Accessed 02 December, 2025.
- Stavans, Ilan. 1996. Julio Cortázar: A Study of the Short Fiction. Twayne’s Studies in Short Fiction, Gordon Weaver, general editor. Twayne Publishers, New York. ISBN 0-8057-8293-1
- Walsh, David. 2002. “Changed conditions and some of the same problems.” Buenos Aires 4th International Festival of Independent Cinema—Part 1. World Socialist Web Site, May 15, 2002. https://www.wsws.org/en/articles/2002/05/baff-m15.html Accessed 02 November, 2025.

== Bibliography ==
- Ronald Schwartz. Latin American Films, 1932-1994: A Critical Filmography. McFarland, 2005.
