= Mario David (director) =

Argentine film director and screenwriter

Mario David (1 May 1930 in Adolfo Gonzales Chaves, Buenos Aires Province - 13 April 2001 in Buenos Aires) was an Argentine film director and screenwriter. He directed and wrote 12 films between 1971 and 1996.

His debut drama El Ayudante, about a truck driver (Pepe Soriano) who befriends a young, deaf male assistant, was based on the book El sordomudo by the author Bernardo Kordon. Upon release 25 March 1971 in Buenos Aires, it was both a box office success and critically acclaimed, with the critic from the newspaper La Razón writing: "Kordon's story gains expressive vigor in the images and verisimilitude in its characters and forms a captivating poetic climate and a lucid realistic testimony". Due to the success of the film, David was soon joining the Argentine cinematic trend of the period in making commercial sex comedies, releasing his second film, Disputas en la cama (1972), the following year, starring actors such as Víctor Laplace and Soledad Silveyra. His third picture, Paño verde (1973), is a gangster film set in Buenos Aires in the 1940s, covering the formation, rise and fall of a criminal gang. The film is based on a 1955 novel of the same name by Roger Plá.

In 1974, David released El Amor infiel, which was based on a novel by María Angélica Bosco. In 1979, David made La Rabona, a comedy film which starred Alberto Closas in the lead role. Rafael Granados opined: "Mario David constructs a sensitive film, whose images are spoken softly". In their 2001 book Un diccionario de films argentinos (1930-1995), Raúl Manrupe and María Alejandra Portela describe La Rabona as a "discreet effort to get away from an industry in crisis, in a difficult time not only for the cinema". In 1985, David shot La cruz invertida, a political film based on the novel by Marcos Aguini.

== Filmography ==
=== As director and screenwriter ===
- El Ayudante (1971)
- Disputas en la cama (1972)
- Paño verde (1973)
- La Piel del amor (1973)
- El Amor infiel (1974)
- El Grito de Celina (1976)
- La Rabona (1979)
- Cantaniño cuenta un cuento (1979)
- El bromista (1981)
- La cruz invertida (1985)
- Con la misma bronca (1988)
- La revelación (1996)
