= Magic Bay =

- Directed by: Marina Valentini
- Written by: José María Paolantonio based on a book by Ricardo Wullicher
- Starring: Alfredo Allende; Carlos Álvarez-Novoa
- Narrated by: Mariano Arenas
- Distributed by: Buena Vista International
- Release date: 2002
- Country: Argentina
- Language: Spanish

Magic Bay (Spanish title: Bahía mágica) is a 2002 Argentine animated adventure film combining a human cast with animated figures, directed by Marina Valentini and script written by José María Paolantonio based on a book by Ricardo Wullicher.

== Release ==
The film premiered in Argentina on 26 December 2002.

== Cast ==
- Alfredo Allende - Marinero Alex
- Carlos Álvarez-Novoa - Bartolo
- Mariano Arenas - Narrator
- Fabián Arenillas - Assistante Dr. Rato
- Eduardo Avakian - Voz del loro
- Aldo Barbero - Voz de Tibor
- Roberto Carnaghi
- Francisco Corbalán - Raúl
- Martín Coria - Pescador
- Débora Cuenca - Chica del bote
- Edson da Silva Pinheiro - Científica brasileño
- Soledad Delgadollo - Entrenadora Soledad
- Camila Deppe - Hermanita de Raúl
- Eduardo Ferrari - Voz del Tiburón y del Pulpo
- Freddy Friedlander - Científico alemán
- Luis Herrera - Assistante del Dr. Rato
- Pablo Ini - Doblaje de Pedro
- Hugo Koghan - Marinero Angel
- Liz Lobato
- Daniel Miglioli - Prefecto
- Luciano Nóbile - Quique
- Jean Pierre Noher
- Francisco Olmo - Dr. Rato
- Elvira Onetto - Dra. Ronsky
- Omar Pini
- Fernando Rivas Goncalvez - Niño dominicano
- Ricardo Rodríguez - Pedro
- Mariela Samaniego - Mamá de Raúl
- Rosario Sánchez Almada - Voz de la Gaviota y de la Tortuga
- Adolfo Stambulsky - Voz del Delfín y del Pez Rayado
- Gustavo Wagner - Dueño del parque
- Juan Diego West - Chico del bote
