= Under Flag =

1997 Argentine mystery drama film

- Theatrical release poster
- Spanish: Bajo bandera
- Directed by: Juan José Jusid
- Written by: Juan José Jusid; Guillermo Saccomanno
- Based on: Bajo bandera by Guillermo Saccomanno
- Produced by: Jaime Nuguer; Pablo Rovito
- Starring: Miguel Ángel Solá; Federico Luppi
- Cinematography: Paolo Carnera
- Edited by: Jorge Valencia
- Music by: Federico Jusid
- Production companies: Film Suez; Instituto Nacional de Cine y Artes Audiovisuales (INCAA)
- Release date: 21 August 1997
- Running time: 109 minutes
- Countries: Argentina; Italy
- Language: Spanish

Under Flag (Spanish: Bajo bandera) is a 1997 Argentine mystery drama film directed by Juan José Jusid and starring Miguel Ángel Solá, Omero Antonutti, Daniele Liotti, Andrea Pietra and Federico Luppi. It was written by Juan José Jusid with Guillermo Saccomanno, the author of the novel on which the film is based.

The film won 7 awards and 2 nominations, including 3 Silver Condor of the Argentine Film Critics Association Awards for Best Music, Best New Actor (Nicolás Scarpino), and Best Screenplay respectively.

The film is loosely based on the murder of Omar Carrasco, although Jusid stated that he wished that people would not associate the plot only with Carrasco's case and that the aim was to show how broad abuses in the military in Argentina were common.

== Cast ==
- Miguel Ángel Solá as Mayor Molina
- Federico Luppi as Coronel Hellman
- Omero Antonutti as Padre Bruno
- Daniele Liotti as Soldado Repetto
- Andrea Tenuta as Fanny
- Andrea Pietra as Nora
- Carlos Santamaría as Capitán Roca
- Alessandra Acciai as Victoria
- Mónica Galán as Paula
- Betiana Blum as Bonavena
- Ariel Casas as Subteniente Trevi
- Juan Andrés Bracelli as Lito
- Nicolás Scarpino as Rosen
- Rolly Serrano as Cabo Benamino
- Walter Balzarini as Joaquín
- Alan McCormick as Polaco
- Damián Canduci as Perro
