= Cipe Lincovsky =

Argentine actress (1929–2015)

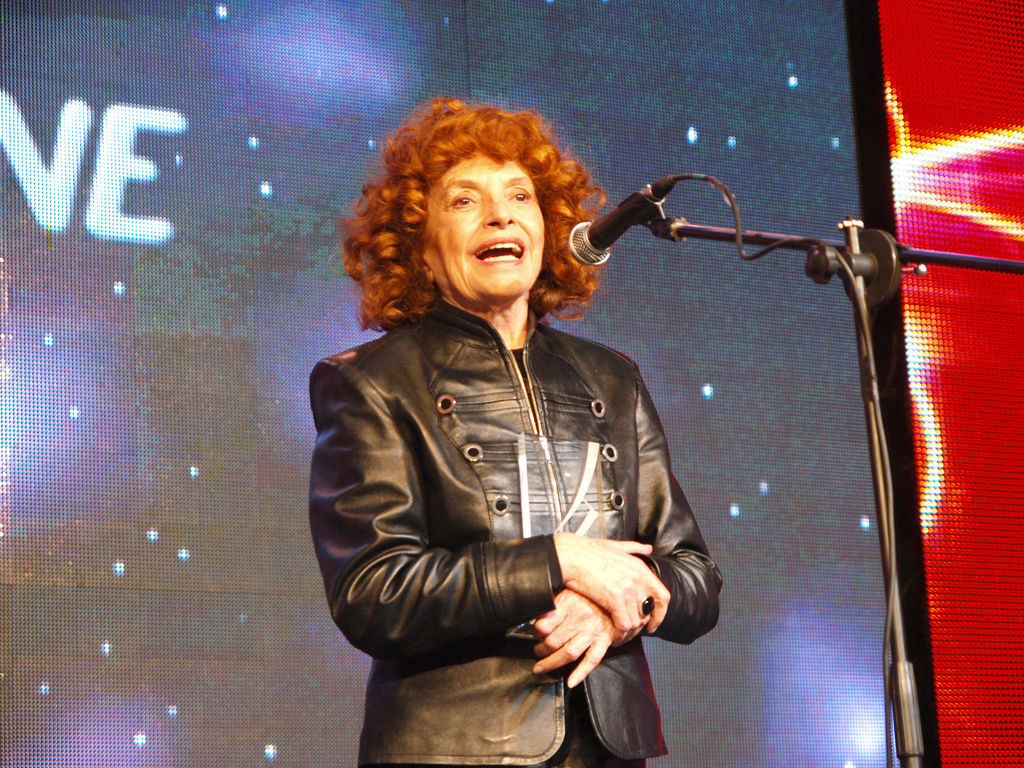
Cipe Lincovsky

Cecilia "Cipe" Lincovsky (21 September 1929 – 31 August 2015) was an Argentine actress.

She made her stage debut in 1953, and joined the Berliner Ensemble in 1960. Lincovsky spent much of her career overseas, including in Venezuela and France, as she had drawn attention from Argentine Anticommunist Alliance, a death squad. Returning to Argentina via Spain in the 1980s, Lincovsky joined the Argentine Open Theatre. She was awarded the Silver Condor Award for Best Actress in 1990.

She died of cardiac arrest and kidney failure in her hometown of Buenos Aires on 31 August 2015, aged 85. Lincovsky was buried in La Chacarita cemetery the next day.

== Selected filmography ==
- Quebracho (1974)
- The Truce (1974)
- Poor Butterfly (1986)
- Apartment Zero (1988)
- The Girlfriend (1988)
- The Two Waters (1988)
- Naked Tango (1991)
- Wild Horses (1995)
- A Love in Moisés Ville (2001)
- The German Friend (2012)
