= Ricardo Wullicher =

Argentine film director

Ricardo Wullicher (born 21 May 1948) is an Argentine film director. He is best known for his 1976 thriller La casa de las sombras (House of shadows).

Wullicher was born in Buenos Aires. His 1972 movie Quebracho tells the story of "La Forestal," an English company extracting Quebracho trees between 1900 and 1963 in the northern province of Santa Fe. The wood and its main product, tannin, were highly coveted between 1918 and 1945 and became a focal point of political and social struggles connected with the evolution of trade unionism, as well as the emergence of the Radical Civic Union and Peronism. It is considered an iconic film of its period, if now somewhat dated. His 1978 documentary Borges para millones, about the writer Jorge Luis Borges, includes an interview with Borges and staged reenactments of some of his works.

After the return to civilian rule in 1983, the government of Raúl Alfonsín abolished censorship, placing Wullicher and Manuel Antín in charge of the National Film Institute. The period that followed saw a renaissance in the Argentine film industry.

Wullicher's 1995 film La nave de los locos (The ship of fools) is set in a small town in Patagonia, where a Mapuche Indian chief sets fire to a tourist complex that is under construction, and refuses to defend himself. The story contrasts his approach of waiting for help to arrive from the ship of fools, a traditional source of strength that caused him to start the fire, and that of his appointed defense lawyer, a white woman who argues that he acting in self-defense since the commercial structures were being built on the sacred burial grounds of his ancestors. His book Magic Bay (Spanish title: Bahía mágica) was the subject of the animated adventure film of the same name released in December 2002.

== Filmography ==
Wullicher directed the following films:

- 1972 Quebracho
- 1976 La casa de las sombras (House of Shadows) (Thriller)
- 1977 Saverio, el cruel
- 1978 Borges para millones (documentary)
- 1981 De la misteriosa Buenos Aires (segment "Pulsera de los cascabeles, La")
- 1983 Mercedes Sosa: como un pájaro libre (documentary)
- 1995 La nave de los locos (The ship of fools)
- 2010 Para todos los hombres y mujeres de buena voluntad (short)
