= The Party Is Over =

1960 film

- Directed by: Leopoldo Torre Nilsson
- Written by: Beatriz Guido; Ricardo Luna; Leopoldo Torre Nilsson
- Produced by: Néstor R. Gaffet; Juan Sires; Leopoldo Torre Nilsson
- Starring: Arturo García Buhr
- Cinematography: Ricardo Younis
- Edited by: José Serra
- Release date: 23 June 1960
- Running time: 104 minutes
- Country: Argentina
- Language: Spanish

The Party Is Over (Spanish: Fin de fiesta) is a 1960 Argentine drama film directed by Leopoldo Torre Nilsson. It was entered into the 10th Berlin International Film Festival. The film depicts the political corruption in Argentina in the 1930s, a period known as the Infamous Decade.

== Cast ==
- Arturo García Buhr as Mariano Braceras
- Lautaro Murúa as Guastavino
- Graciela Borges as Mariana Braceras
- Leonardo Favio as Adolfo Peña Braceras
- Elena Tritek as The Prostitute
- Osvaldo Terranova
- Lydia Lamaison
- María Principito
- Idelma Carlo
- Hilda Suárez
- Leda Zanda
- Juan Carlos Galván
- Santángelo
- Emilio Guevara
- Ricardo Robles
