= Puerta de Hierro (Madrid) =

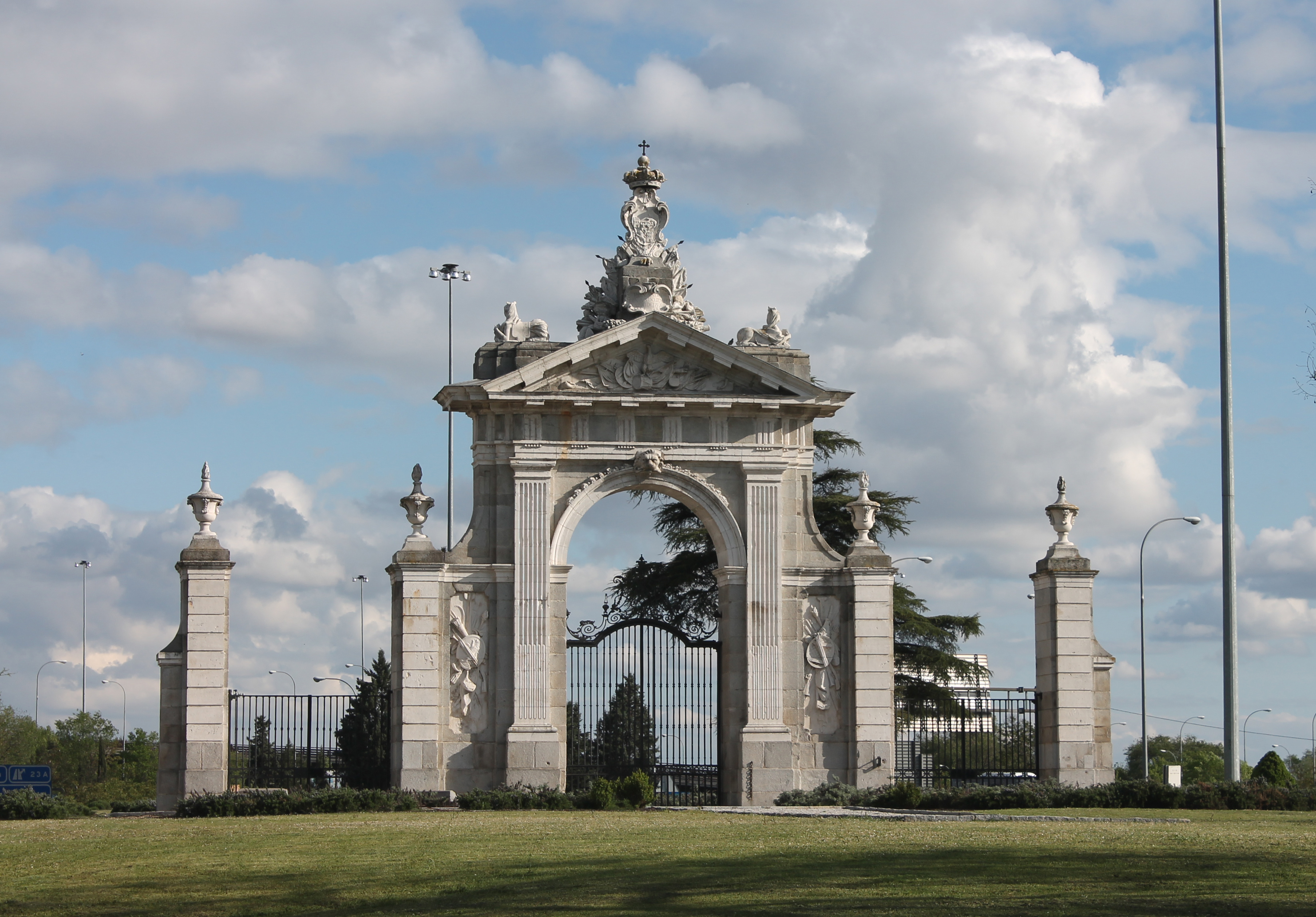
- Interactive map of the Puerta de Hierro area

General information
- Location: Madrid, Spain
- Construction started: 1751
- Completed: 1753

Puerta de Hierro (Spanish for Iron Gate) is a monument of the second half of the 18th century, located in the northwest of Madrid, Spain, in the district of Moncloa near the Monte de El Pardo. It occupies a landscaped traffic island, defined by several branches of the highway A-6 and M-30, an enclave which is difficult to access. It is built in classical Baroque style.

== Location ==
Unlike the other three monumental gates of Madrid (those of Puerta de Alcala, Puerta de Toledo and Puerta de San Vicente), Puerta de Hierro is not in the city centre, but at the western edge, near the University City and the Government Palace of Moncloa. It was erected here because this was the ceremonial entrance to the Royal Park of El Pardo, a hunting area historically reserved to the Spanish monarchy and, at present, it is protected through the Regional Park of the Cuenca Alta del Manzanares. It was built between 1751 and 1753.

A neighbouring residential area is sometimes named after it. The Argentine president Juan Domingo Perón had a villa there during his Spanish exile. Hence the title of the biographic film Puerta de Hierro, el exilio de Perón. The area is also known for its world famous country club, Real Club de la Puerta de Hierro.

== Links ==
- Media related to Puerta de Hierro, Madrid at Wikimedia Commons
