= El mar de Lucas =

- DVD cover
- Directed by: Víctor Laplace
- Written by: Víctor Laplace; Martín Salinas
- Produced by: Víctor Laplace
- Starring: Víctor Laplace; Pablo Rago
- Cinematography: Fabián Giacometti
- Edited by: César Custodio; Miguel Pérez
- Music by: Damián Laplace
- Distributed by: Primer Plano Film Group
- Release date: November 1999 (Mar del Plata Film Festival)
- Running time: 97 minutes
- Country: Argentina
- Language: Spanish

El mar de Lucas (1999) is an Argentine film directed by Víctor Laplace and written by Laplace and Martín Salinas. The story features Víctor Laplace, Pablo Rago, Virginia Innocenti, and others.

== Plot ==
The films tells of father, Juan Denevi (Victor Laplace), who gets the surprise of his life on his fiftieth birthday when he finds out that he's become a grandfather. The movie opens in Buenos Aires, Argentina, and Juan is cooking individual personal favorite dishes for his friends, the patrons of his restaurant.

A young woman named Manuela (Virginia Innocentti) appears with a 3-year-old boy (Lucas) and announces that Lucas is Juan's grandson. Juan hasn't seen his son Facundo (Pablo Rago) for many years, and during this time, Facundo has married and had a son.

Facundo's wife and son find Juan at his birthday party and beg him to come help Facundo with a family crisis.

== Cast ==
- Víctor Laplace as Juan Denevi
- Pablo Rago as Facundo Denevi
- Virginia Innocenti as Manuela
- Ana María Picchio as Clara
- Betiana Blum as Ana
- Rodolfo Ranni as Rolo
- Ulises Dumont as Nacho
- Lautaro Penella as Lucas Denevi
- Norberto Díaz as Secretario del intendente
- Adolfo Yanelli as Carlitos
- David Di Napoli as Martillero
- Pía Uribelarrea as Silvia
- Óscar Guzmán as Lalo
- Antonio Bax as Pedro
- Eugenia Tobal as Marisa

== Awards ==
Wins

- Mar del Plata Film Festival: Special Mention, Víctor Laplace, for a first work; 1999.
- Cartagena Film Festival: Golden India Catalina, Best Screenplay, Víctor Laplace; 2000.

Nominations

- Cartagena Film Festival: Golden India Catalina, Best Film, Víctor Laplace; 2000.
- Argentine Film Critics Association Awards: Silver Condor, Best First Film, Víctor Laplace; Best Supporting Actress, Virginia Innocenti; 2001.
