= Quebracho (film) =

Argentine 1974 film directed by Ricardo Wullicher

Quebracho is an Argentine 1974 film directed by Ricardo Wullicher. It tells the story of "La Forestal," an English company exploiting Quebracho trees between 1900 and 1963 in the northern province of Santa Fe. The wood and its main product, tannin, were highly coveted between 1918 and 1945 and became a focal point of political and social struggles connected with the evolution of trade unionism, as well as the emergence of the Radical Civic Union and Peronism. It is considered an iconic film of the 1970s, if now somewhat dated.

== Cast ==
- Lautaro Murúa
- Juan Carlos Gené
- Héctor Alterio
- Cipe Lincovsky
- Luis Aranda
- Hector Pellegrini
- Walter Vidarte
