= Explosive Brigade Against the Ninjas =

Brigada explosiva contra los ninjas
- Directed by: Miguel Fernández Alonso
- Written by: Salvador Valverde Calv
- Produced by: Carlos Mentasti
- Starring: Moria Casán; Emilio Disi
- Edited by: Serafín Molina
- Music by: Pocho Lapouble; Pablo Ziegler
- Distributed by: Argentina Sono Film
- Release date: 3 July 1986
- Country: Argentina
- Language: Spanish
- Budget: 70 minutes

Brigada explosiva contra los ninjas ("Explosive Brigade Against the Ninjas") is a 1986 Argentine adventure comedy film directed by Miguel Fernández Alonso and written by Salvador Valverde Calvo. The film starred Moria Casán and Emilio Disi. It is a sequel to the Argentine film Brigada explosiva (1986).

== Plot ==
The eccentric agents Gino, Emilio, Alberto, and Benito embark on their second mission: to combat a notorious group of ninjas who have abducted a high-ranking government executive. Success in their mission is crucial as it will prevent the dissolution of the esteemed Z Brigade.

== Cast ==
- Moria Casán: Margarita Zavaleta
- Emilio Disi: Emilio
- Gino Renni: Gino Foderone
- Berugo Carámbula: Benito
- Daniel Guerrero: Macarius
- Mario Castiglione: Sergeant
- Tincho Zabala: Don Genaro
- Alberto Fernández de Rosa: Alberto Rosales
- Edgardo Mesa: Boxing announcer
- Anamá Ferreyra
- Isidoro Chiodi
- Carlos Roffé: Yoga professor
