= The Girlfriend (1988 film) =

1988 film

- Theatrical release poster
- Directed by: Jeanine Meerapfel
- Written by: Osvaldo Bayer; Alcides Chiesa; Agnieszka Holland; Jeanine Meerapfel
- Produced by: Klaus Volkenborn; Jorge Estrada Mora
- Starring: Liv Ullmann; Cipe Lincovsky; Víctor Laplace; Lito Cruz; Nicolás Frei; Harry Baer
- Cinematography: Axel Block
- Edited by: Juliane Lorenz
- Music by: José Luis Castiñeira de Dios
- Production companies: Alma Film; Jorge Estrada Mora Producciones; Journal-Film Klaus Volkenborn; Sender Freies Berlin
- Distributed by: Arsenal Filmverleih (1991, Germany); Jupiter Communications (1988, Worldwide)
- Release date: September 21, 1988
- Running time: 110 minutes
- Countries: Argentina; West Germany
- Languages: German; Spanish

The Girlfriend (Spanish: La amiga) is a 1988 Argentine-German historical drama film directed by Jeanine Meerapfel and starring Liv Ullmann, Cipe Lincovsky and Federico Luppi. It was written by Osvaldo Bayer, Alcides Chiesa, Jeanine Meerapfel and Agnieszka Holland. The film was selected as the Argentine entry for the Best Foreign Language Film at the 62nd Academy Awards, but was not accepted as a nominee.

== Plot ==
María and Pancho (Liv Ullmann and Federico Luppi) are a happily married couple in a quiet, working-class suburb south of Buenos Aires, circa 1978. They share the grief over the disappearance of their eldest son Carlos (Gonzalo Arguimbau), with María's lifelong friend Raquel Kessler (Cipe Lincovsky), a feisty Jewish girl whose cultural identity made her a target to some; but all the more endearing to María, her only gentile childhood friend.

"Married" to the theatre, in which she became prominent, Raquel's career has been protected from anti-Semitic attacks by her lover Diego (Victor Laplace), an influential public television executive who skillfully maintains a balance between his love for the opinionated Raquel and the need to placate the repressive mindset prevalent in that era's last civil-military dictatorship (1976-1983).

María's relentless search for her son strains her relationship with both her husband and Raquel, who give up hope after lengthy and costly attempts to find him. Raquel's own Jewish identity and fondness for roles "discouraged" by the dictatorship such as Antigone cause her serious problems, as well, and lead to her exile in Berlin. María, who had always led a quiet life, earns the growing respect of her fellow Mothers of the Plaza de Mayo, women from all walks of life united by their search for their detained sons and daughters (most of whom were known by the dictatorship to be uninvolved in political violence).

This mission becomes her life's passion and eventually leads her to Berlin, where a German Argentine exile tells her of his having seen Carlos near death at one of the many secret government detention centers, an anecdote rejected by the grieving María, who returns to Buenos Aires driven to find her son. Raquel herself returns to Argentina following democratic elections in 1983, finding that Diego is unhappily married and that María will never accept the death of her son as fact. Bewildered, Raquel nearly gives up on María; finding instead that the bonds of a lifelong friendship endure.

== Cast ==
- Liv Ullmann ... María
- Cipe Lincovsky ... Raquel Kessler
- Federico Luppi ... Pancho
- Víctor Laplace ... Diego
- Lito Cruz ... Tito, the police lieutenant
- Nicolás Frei ... Commando squad leader
- Harry Baer ... Raquel's friend in Berlin
- Gregor Hansen ... Witness to Carlos' torture
- Gonzalo Arguimbau ... Carlos
- Fernán Mirás ... Pedro
- Max Berliner ...Cemetery caretaker
- Beatriz Thibaudin ... Unsympathetic neighbor
- Bárbara Mujica ... Maria's dubbed, Spanish-language voice

== See also ==
- List of submissions to the 62nd Academy Awards for Best Foreign Language Film
- List of Argentine submissions for the Academy Award for Best Foreign Language Film
