= El Perseguidor =

- Directed by: Osías Wilenski
- Screenplay by: Ulyses Petit de Murat
- Release date: 1965
- Running time: 75 minute
- Country: Argentina
- Language: Spanish

El Perseguidor is a 1965 Argentine film directed by Osías Wilenski. The screenplay, written by Ulyses Petit de Murat, is based on the short story El perseguidor by Julio Cortázar, which was inspired by the life of Charlie Parker.

In 2022, the film was included in Spanish magazine Fotogramas's list of the 20 best Argentine films of all time.

== Synopsis ==
A saxophonist suffers delusions of persecution while drugs and alcohol destroy him.

== Cast ==
- Inda Ledesma
- Sergio Renán
- María Rosa Gallo
- Zelmar Gueñol
- Zulma Faiad
- Anabela Arzón
- Chico Novarro
