= Paño verde =

- Film poster
- Directed by: Mario David
- Written by: Mario David, Roger Plá (novel)
- Produced by: Hugo Flesc (executive), Carlos Sforzini (chief), Harry Havilio (associate)
- Starring: Carlos Estrada, Luis Brandoni, Julia von Grolman and Héctor Alterio.
- Cinematography: Arsenio Reinaldo Pica
- Edited by: Luis César D'Angiolillo
- Music by: Víctor Proncet
- Production company: Cinematográfica Trío S.R.L.
- Release date: 1 March 1973
- Running time: 90 minutes
- Country: Argentina
- Language: Spanish

Paño verde (Green Cloth) is a 1973 Argentina gangster film drama directed by Mario David. The film, based on a 1955 novel of the same name by Roger Plá, is set in Buenos Aires in the 1940s, covering the formation, rise and fall of a criminal gang. It stars Carlos Estrada as the protagonist mafia boss, Miguel Acuña, Luis Brandoni, Julia von Grolman and Héctor Alterio. Víctor Proncet composed the soundtracks.

== Plot ==
In 1940s Buenos Aires, the laconic, immaculately dressed Miguel Acuña, or "El Púa" (Carlos Estrada) leads a double life. He owns a bar and appears apathetic to the customers, but is secretly a violent criminal. He murders the local mafia boss after threatening him with a knife and shoots him dead when he reacts with a gun. He throws the knife in the river. Miguel becomes the leader.

The gang pulls off a series of robberies. At one robbery by the docks, they shoot several people dead, including several of the guards and a man in a car, which they use as the getaway vehicle after the tires are shot out on their vehicle. In the next robbery, Miguel accidentally shoots a young boy dead while shooting at the guards. His guilt is only revealed when he overhears customers at the bar talking about his death, forcing him to walk out in awkward silence.

While planning a bigger caper, Alma (Julia von Grolman), the wife of his associate Américo (Luis Brandoni), falls in love with Miguel. Miguel reluctantly relents to her advances but proceeds to beat her, despite professing his love for her. Tano, one of the gang members, is reluctant to participate in the imminent big bank robbery and is threatened by Miguel. During the robbery, when Tano's worries come to fruition and he is shot by one of the guards, rather than save him, Miguel shoots him dead while making their escape. The getaway vehicle catches fire, but the men escape.

The police invade Américo and Alma's flat while Américo is in the bathroom shaving. Américo pretends to surrender but turns on an officer, holding his razor blade to his throat, but is shot dead in front of his wife as backup officers arrive. The police arrive at the bar and surround Miguel. Miguel manages to escape, but only by ruthlessly shooting a female admirer and an old friend to buy himself time to escape. He is eventually shot on the roof and falls to his death through the skylight onto the bar's pool table, much to the shock of the bartender, who had never suspected his wicked ways.

== Cast ==
- Carlos Estrada as Miguel Acuña, "El Púa"
- Luis Brandoni as Américo
- Julia von Grolman as Alma
- Héctor Alterio as El "Tano" Folco
- Edgardo Suárez as Galíndez
- Luisina Brando as Chola
- José María Gutiérrez as Ambrosio
- Juan Carlos de Seta
- Alicia Bruzzo as Pola
- María José Demare as Prostitute
- Raúl del Valle
- Aldo Mayo as Policeman
- Olga Berg as Woman at dance
- Mario Savino as boy in bar
- Ricardo Grecco
- Osvaldo María Cabrera
- Tito Barceló as singer
- María Estela Lorca as woman in assault
- Marta Serra
- Carlos Veltri
- Mara Lascio
- Amadeo Sáenz Valiente
- Pachi Armas
- Mario Luciani
- Félix Caballero
- Domingo Cutri
- Lucho Fabri
- Juan Carlos Villegas
- Andrés Midón
- Roberto Fiore
- Clemente Bermúdez
- Denis Romano
- Juan Carlos Ricci
- Alejandro Villordo Paz
- Raimondo Diego
- Domingo Barbieri
- Tito Báez
- Arsenio Reinaldo Pica
- José María Brindisi
- Lidia Lugo

== Production ==
The screenplay was written by the director Mario David, based on the 1955 novel of the same name by Roger Plá. Cinematographer Arsenio Reinaldo Pica was hired to shoot the film, working with cameraman Roberto Matarrese. Víctor Proncet composed the soundtrack, while the editing was done by Oscar Pariso.

== Reception ==
The film premiered on 1 March 1973 in Buenos Aires. It was well received by the critics, with Edmundo Etchelbaum of La Opinión declaring it to be a "Revelation of a good commercial film director" and La Razón stating that the film has "good technical quality and a group of excellent actors". Clarín though was more favorable to the cinematography, opining that the "camera extracts much more and is so much better than some of the passages of dialogue", which they believed cooled the effectiveness of certain scenes. In his book Breve historia del cine argentino, César Maranghello states that he believes Paño verde to have been David's best picture, praising the "fury and nostalgia of its protagonist", Carlos Estrada.

== See also ==
- List of Argentine films of 1973
