= Zulma Faiad =

Argentine vedette and actress

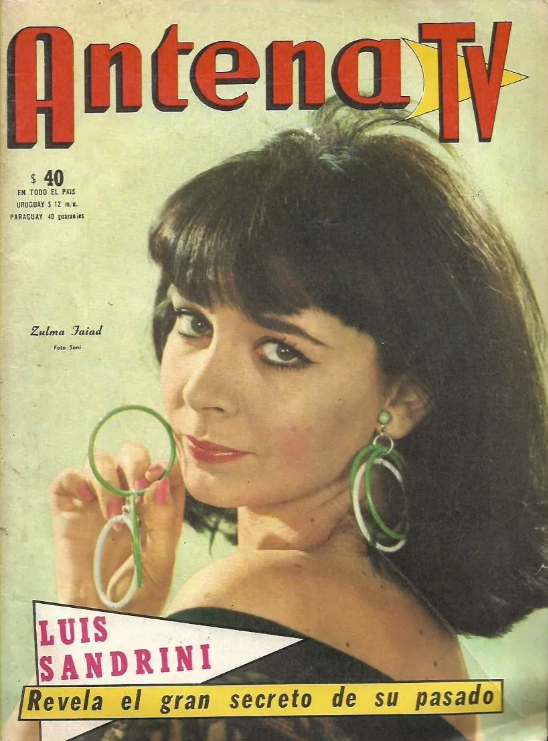
- Faiad on the cover of Antena TV magazine, 1967
- Born: Zulma Aurora Faiad; February 21, 1944 (age 81); Buenos Aires, Argentina
- Occupation(s): Vedette; Actress; Dancer
- Years active: 1963–present
- Spouse: Daniel Guerrero
- Children: Daniela Guerrero; Eleonora Guerrero

Zulma Aurora Faiad (born February 21, 1944, in Buenos Aires, Argentina) is an Argentine vedette and actress.

== Biography ==
Zulma Faiad grew up with her sister Virginia Faiad in the bosom of an Argentine middle-class family of Lebanese descent. Her parents Jacinto Faiad and Aurora De Faiad were both Lebanese immigrants. Her parents separated when she was still very young. Her father was an accountant, and worked several hours a day, so her mother, Aurora de Faiad was in charge of giving her artistic training. At age seven, she entered the school of the Teatro Colón, where she studied choreography and perfected her acting vocation with the theater.

At the beginning of the decade of the 1960, she began as an advertising model and her protagonist participation in a television advertisement of an oil brand gave birth to the affectionate popular nickname of "La Lechuguita" alluding to the characterization that she made. From the Teatro Maipo where she worked, she moved to the Teatro Nacional Cervantes.

She worked with comedians Juan Carlos Mesa and Adolfo Stray. She was one of the three famous "Singles" of Channel 13.

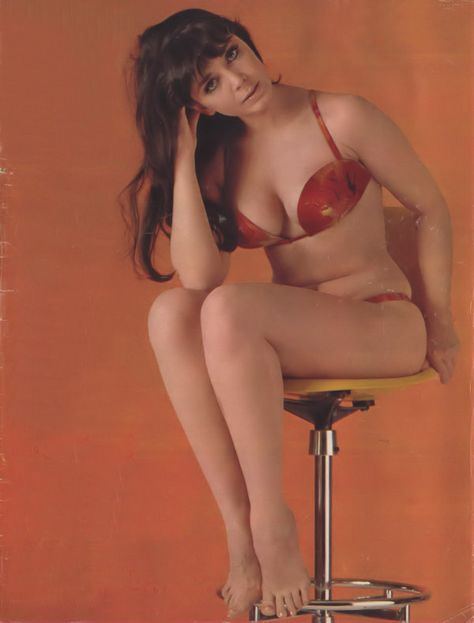
Faiad on Siete Días Ilustrados magazine, January 1971

In cinema she had a prolific career, acting in 17 films.

In Mexico she participated in several films, of which the most remembered are those in which she acted next to Mauricio Garcés. She had traveled to Mexico for forty days and ended up staying seven years. She also worked as an exclusive figure on commercials for PEMEX.

During the ’70s and early ’80s she ventured with great success as a vedette in theater shows, alongside stars such as Nélida Lobato, Dario Vittori, Silvia Legrand, Osvaldo Martínez, Carmen Barbieri and Moria Casán. In Mexico, she made her debut on the theatrical stages in 1969, in a play along with Maria Victoria and Marco Antonio Muñiz.

In 1990, she participated as an actress in some television shows. Already withdrawn from the theater and from the television screen, since 2000 she hosted her own radio program at dawn, where she stood out for her Christian spiritual messages. She was also called by Marcelo Tinelli to be a juror at Bailando por un Sueño.

Since 2015, she performs in the Aldo Funes play, Mujeres de ceniza.

She entered without success in politics. She was a candidate for first national deputy by the City of Buenos Aires, as a member the Partido de la Esperanza Porteña political party, in the legislative elections of October 23, 2005.

== Personal life ==
She had two well-known relationships, the first one was with Melchor Arana, with whom she lived the 7 years abroad. The second was with Daniel Guerrero, whom she married in Mexico, and with whom she had her two daughters, Daniela and Eleonora, the latter a talented singer. Her sister, Virginia Faiad, a few years younger than her, has also, but less assiduously, ventured into acting and magazine.

== Filmography ==
=== Films ===
- 1963: Rata de puerto
- 1964: Las mujeres los prefieren tontos o Placeres conyugales
- 1965: El perseguidor
- 1965: Nacidos para cantar
- 1965: Ritmo nuevo y vieja ola
- 1965: Psique y sexo
- 1965: Villa Delicia, playa de estacionamiento, música ambiental
- 1965: Los ratones
- 1966: La buena vida
- 1966: Necesito una madre
- 1967: La cigarra está que arde
- 1968: La cama
- 1969: Al rojo vivo
- 1969: Amor libre
- 1969: Espérame en Siberia vida mía
- 1969: Modisto de señoras
- 1970: Un amante anda suelto
- 1970: Préstame a tu mujer
- 1971: Los corrompidos
- 1971: Siete Evas para un Adán
- 1971: El ídolo
- 1972: Rosario
- 1972: Disputas en la cama
- 1972: En esta cama nadie duerme
- 1972: La noche de los mil gatos
- 1973: Cumbia
- 1973: El castillo de las momias de Guanajuato
- 1973: La casa del amor
- 1974: La flor de la mafia
- 1974: El amor infiel
- 1974: Las viboras cambian de piel
- 1979: Las golfas del talón
- 1983: La pulga en la oreja
- 1988: Matrimonios... y algo más '88
- 1991: La risa está servida

=== Television ===
- Solamente vos (2013) ... Miriam
- Bailando por un Sueño (2006)
- Floricienta (2004) ... Titina
- Resistiré (2003)
- Costumbres argentinas (2003)
- ¿Quién es Alejandro Chomski? (2002)
- Señoras sin señores (1998)
- Ciudad prohibida (1997)
- Cada día una mujer (1996) ... Lunes
- Por siempre mujercitas (1995)
- Fiesta y bronca de ser joven (1992)
- Matrimonios y algo más (1987) ... various characters
- Sola (1983)
- El superejecutivo Don Jacobo (1968), with Adolfo Stray
