= The Skin of Love =

- Directed by: Mario David
- Written by: Mario David, Isaac Aisemberg
- Produced by: Hugo Flesc (executive), Elida Stantic (chief)
- Starring: Susana Giménez, Claudio García Satur, Héctor Alterio
- Cinematography: Adelqui Camusso
- Edited by: Oscar Pariso
- Music by: Víctor Proncet
- Production company: Cinematográfica Trío Globus Baires
- Distributed by: Producciones Imperial
- Release date: 26 July 1973
- Running time: 77 minutes
- Country: Argentina
- Language: Spanish

The Skin of Love (La piel del amor) is a 1973 Argentine romantic comedy-drama film directed by Mario David, who also wrote the script, working with Isaac Aisemberg. Shot in Mar del Plata, it stars Susana Giménez, Claudio García Satur, Héctor Alterio and David Llewellyn. Víctor Proncet composed the soundtrack. Though not critically acclaimed, it became a popular film on television in Argentina.

== Plot ==
A young man on holiday, drawing at the beach to pay for his expenses, meets an attractive woman with long, honey blond hair. While sketching her, they develop a friendship. They take a swim together and have refreshments before she departs. A romance blossoms and they have sex at his apartment, as his portraits on the walls look on. Besotted with her, he draws many pictures of her in the nude during his spare time on the beach.

While on a boat trip one day, the woman invites him to her mansion to meet her wealthy middle-aged husband, Luis, and he is asked to stay with them at their mansion. It becomes evident to the young man that her husband is homosexual and they have no chemistry together, and their relationship continues and an odd dynamic evolves between the three. Despite having a boyfriend, Luis becomes increasingly uneasy, driving the boat excessively fast and crumpling up a portrait the young man draws of him. Luis orders them to dance in front of him on the beach and they end up frolicking in the sand together, which angers him. He questions the young man on if he is in love with his wife, leading to the two men fighting as the waves crash around them. Luis drives off in his boat, and he is later found dead washed up on the shore. The two continue their romance.

== Cast ==
- Susana Giménez
- Claudio García Satur
- Héctor Alterio as Luis
- David Llewellyn
- Jesús Berenguer

== Production ==
The screenplay was written by the director Mario David, working with Isaac Aisemberg. Cinematographer Adelqui Camusso was hired to shoot the film. Víctor Proncet composed the Latin jazz soundtrack, while the editing was done by Oscar Pariso.

== Reception ==
The film premiered on 26 July 1973 in Buenos Aires. The film was not well-received critically. Agustín Mahieu of La Opinión wrote: "Both the story and the cast illustrate remarkably about the director's expressive dichotomy, forced to grant a series of elements to introduce others more in keeping with his seriousness". Carlos Morelli of Clarín believed that the production was a mistake, remarking that "anecdotal insufficiency of the chosen matter makes such a languid and lazy visual procedure that, unintentionally, it dangerously approaches the arrogant emptiness of certain French cinema." El Heraldo del Cine wrote that "It is difficult to sustain an aspect like the one intended with the mere display of Mar del Plata landscapes". In his book Cine argentino: modernidad y vanguardias, 1957/1983, Ricardo Manetti states that the film became popular on television in Argentina.

== See also ==
- List of Argentine films of 1973
