= Traitors of San Angel =

1967 film by Leopoldo Torre Nilsson

- Directed by: Leopoldo Torre Nilsson
- Written by: Edgardo Cozarinsky; André Du Rona; Beatriz Guido; James Lewis; Leopoldo Torre Nilsson
- Produced by: André Du Rona; Leopoldo Torre Nilsson
- Starring: Ian Hendry; Lautaro Murúa; Graciela Borges
- Cinematography: Alex Phillips
- Edited by: Jorge Gárate; Chuck Workman
- Music by: Sergio Mihanovich
- Production companies: Clasa Films Mundiales; Du Rona – Torre Nilsson
- Distributed by: Contracuadro
- Release date: 17 October 1967
- Running time: 75 minutes
- Countries: Argentina; Chile; Mexico; Puerto Rico; United States
- Language: Spanish

Traitors of San Angel (Spanish:Los traidores de San Ángel) is a 1967 action film directed by Leopoldo Torre Nilsson and starring Ian Hendry, Lautaro Murúa and Graciela Borges. It was a co-production between Argentina, Chile, Mexico, Puerto Rico and United States.

== Synopsis ==
A priest recently arrived in a Caribbean country is arrested, accused of conspiracy because the dictator who rules the country suspects that a conspiracy is being plotted in a convent.

== Cast ==
- Ian Hendry as Nick Thomas
- Lautaro Murúa as Fonseca
- Graciela Borges as Marina
- Maurice Evans as James Keefe
- Enrique Lucero as Rodriguez
- Esther Sandoval as Dona Consuelo
- José de San Antón as Director Carcel

== Bibliography ==
- Peter Cowie & Derek Elley. World Filmography: 1967. Fairleigh Dickinson University Press, 1977.
