= La casa de las sombras =

- Directed by: Richard Wulicher
- Written by: Enrique Torres Tudela
- Produced by: Enrique Torres Tudela
- Starring: Yvonne De Carlo; John Gavin; Leonor Manso; Mecha Ortiz
- Cinematography: Aníbal Di Salvo
- Edited by: Miguel Perez
- Music by: W. Joseph
- Production company: Darwin Productions
- Distributed by: Media Home Entertainment (VHS)
- Release date: 1976 (Argentina)
- Running time: 99 minutes
- Country: Argentina
- Language: English

La casa de las sombras (English: House of Shadows) is a 1976 Argentine mystery thriller film starring Yvonne De Carlo, John Gavin, Leonor Manso and Mecha Ortiz.

== Plot ==
As Audrey walks alone on a stormy night, she hears a woman's voice pleading for mercy. She enters an old deserted mansion only to witness a gruesome murder. The police are summoned, but when they arrive, the body is gone. Audrey, intent on the truth of her vision, sets out to find the body and the murderer. She begins to investigate the murdered woman's past life and the days preceding her death, only to find that the murder happened 23 years ago.

== Cast ==
- Yvonne De Carlo as Mrs. Howard
- John Gavin as Roland Stewart
- Leonor Manso as Audrey Christiansen / Catherine Webster
- Mecha Ortiz as Mrs. Randall
