= Graciela Borges =

Argentine television and film actress

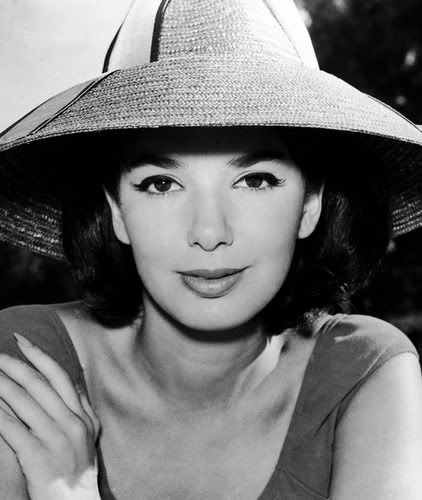
- Borges in 1961
- Born: Graciela Noemí Zabala; June 10, 1941 (age 84); Buenos Aires, Argentina
- Occupation: Actress
- Years active: 1958–present
- Spouse: Juan Manuel Bordeu

Graciela Borges (Spanish pronunciation: [ɡɾaˈsjela ˈβoɾxes]; born Graciela Noemí Zabala; June 10, 1941) is an Argentine television and film actress.

== Life and career ==
Borges was born in Dolores. Having made her film debut at 14, she has acted in over fifty films and was featured in 2006 in Vogue Paris as "the great actress of Argentine cinema".

In 2002, Borges received her first Silver Condor Award for Best Actress for her role in Lucrecia Martel's highly acclaimed La ciénaga. In 2015, the Argentine Film Critics Association recognized her with a lifetime achievement Silver Condor Award.

== Filmography (partial) ==
- Sugar Harvest (1958)
- The Party Is Over (1960)
- Summer Skin (1961)
- The Terrace (1963)
- Circe (1964)
- Traitors of San Angel (1967)
- Monday's Child (1967)
- El dependiente (1969)
- Heroína (1972)
- Poor Butterfly (1986)
- Kindergarten (1989)
- Funes, un Gran Amor (1993)
- Sobre la Tierra (1998)
- La Ciénaga (2001), a.k.a. The Swamp
- Mercano, el Marciano (2002) (voice), a.k.a. Mercano the Martian
- ¿Sabés Nadar? (2002)
- A Cada Lado (2005)
- Monobloc (2005)
- Las manos (2006)
- Brother and Sister (2010)
- Miss Tacuarembó (2010)
- Viudas (2011)
- Un Amor en Tiempos de Selfies (2014)
- El Espejo de los Otros (2015)
- Resentimental (2016)
- La Quietud (2018)
- El Cuento de las Comadrejas (2019)

== Television (partial) ==
- Son o se Hacen (1997) TV Series
- Primicias (2000) TV Series
- Infieles (2002) Mini TV Series
- Botines (2005) Mini TV Series
