= Pocho Lapouble =

- Carlos "Pocho" Lapouble

Background information
- Born: Carlos Alberto Lapouble; 1942; La Plata (Buenos Aires), Argentina
- Died: 2009 (aged 66–67) Adrogué, Greater Buenos Aires, Argentina
- Occupation(s): Drummer, composer, arranger
- Years active: 1959–2009

Carlos Alberto Lapouble (1942 — 2009), better known as Pocho Lapouble, was an Argentine jazz drummer, composer and arranger.

Carlos Alberto Pocho Lapouble was born in La Plata. He and a group of local teens, including pianists Alberto Favero and Caco Álvarez, bassist Guri Baccaro, and trombonist Vicente Izzi, formed the La Plata Contemporary Jazz Group in 1959, performing together until 1968, and appearing in numerous university concerts and radio shows. He formed a trio with Favero and bassist Adalberto Cevasco, with whom he appeared in the contemporary music program at the Torcuato di Tella Institute in 1971, and in 1972 released his first album, Quinteplus, for EMI.

Lapouble became a prominent arranger and musician in the theatre, notably for Norma Aleandro, Inda Ledesma, Lito Cruz, and Juan Carlos Gené. He joined pop singer Palito Ortega in 1972 as lead arranger, and began his work in the cinema of Argentina in 1976 for Ortega as music director in the comedy production, Dos locos en el aire. He joined Cevasco in experimental pianist Gustavo Kerestesachi's jazz trio in 1974, and was honored at the 4th International Festival of Jazz Composers in Monaco, in 1978. Lapouble first composed for film in Alejandro Azzano's 1981 tragedy, Venido a menos. Among his many other Argentine credits include arrangements for Sandro, Leonardo Favio, Raúl Lavié, Nacha Guevara, Susana Giménez, and Antonio Gasalla, as well as numerous local television commercials, including one in which Amelita Baltar, a well-known tango vocalist, began her own career.

He later joined renowned bandoneonist and nuevo tango composer Ástor Piazzolla in his sextet, and later worked with Jorge Anders, Rodolfo Mederos, Dino Saluzzi, Roberto Pettinato, and Karlheinz Miklin, among others. He was honored at the Cannes Film Festival in 1985, 1986, 1988, 1993, and 1995, as well as in numerous Argentine events. He was reunited with pianist Alberto Favero for numerous albums and tours, including a tribute to George Gershwin (1993), Stella by Starlight (1996), and their version of Porgy and Bess (2002). The Argentine Society of Composers (SADAIC), awarded his tango piece, Palermo Viejo, a grand prize in 1998. His film score for Juan José Jusid's romantic comedy ¿Dónde estás amor de mi vida que no te puedo encontrar? (1992) ended his film collaborations, though he made a cameo appearance as himself in Lucho Bender's Felicidades, in 2000.

Lapouble taught in his discipline from 2002 onwards in the Buenos Aires suburb of Monte Grande, and headed the jazz program at the Argentine Society of Music Education (SADEM) from 2004. On May 15, 2009, Lapouble suffered a stroke and died in an Adrogué clinic at age 67.

== See also ==
- List of jazz arrangers
