= El Ayudante =

1971 film

- Directed by: Mario David
- Written by: Mario David, Bernardo Kordon
- Starring: Pepe Soriano; José Slavin; Enrique Fava
- Cinematography: Aníbal Di Salvo
- Edited by: Oscar Pariso
- Music by: Víctor Proncet
- Release date: 25 March 1971
- Running time: 65 minutes
- Country: Argentina
- Language: Spanish

El Ayudante (English: The Helper) is a 1971 Argentine drama film directed and written by Mario David on his directorial debut, and starring Pepe Soriano, José Slavin and Enrique Fava. The screenplay, about a truck driver who befriends a young deaf man, was written by David, based on the book El sordomudo by author Bernardo Kordon. The film premiered on 25 March 1971 in Buenos Aires, and was both a box office success and critically acclaimed.

== Plot ==
The hitchhiker is beaten to death by the truck driver

A truck driver bonds with his new helper, a tall, deaf young man. A warm friendship develops during the transportation, with the driver finding the young man's gestures of situations amusing, including depictions of the body shapes of women they pass. The young man purchases a cigar which they share, and they drink a large bottle of beer together.

A middle-aged man wearing a hat hitches a ride on the truck and helps them with deliveries. The man visits an elderly woman and child and later wins a bare knuckle fight for money. Later, the truck driver discovers that the hitchhiker is wanted by the police. The man abducts the deaf young man and presumably kills him. The driver catches up with the hitchhiker and avenges the loss of his partner by beating him to death with a pole at a railway yard.

== Cast ==
- Pepe Soriano as Aristóbulo Maresca
- José Slavin
- Enrique Fava
- Carlos Olivieri as Cacho
- Lydia Lamaison as Elvira
- Silvana Roth
- Hugo Astar
- María Esther Corán

== Production ==
The screenplay was written by the director Mario David, based on the book El sordomudo by the author Bernardo Kordon. Cinematographer Aníbal Di Salvo was hired to shoot the film. Víctor Proncet composed the soundtrack. The film's editing was done by Oscar Pariso.

== Release and reception ==
El Ayudante premiered on 25 March 1971 in Buenos Aires. The film was both commercially successful and critically acclaimed in Argentina. The critic for the newspaper La Nación commented: "This calm friendship is described with a cinematographic language of hierarchy, made of silences, nuances and looks. There is an intimacy in the film that does not disdain the neorealist touch ... the film arrives, seizes the attention of the viewer, (in a) work of acute psychological uptake". The critic from the newspaper La Razón wrote: "Kordon's story gains expressive vigor in the images and verisimilitude in its characters and forms a captivating poetic climate and a lucid realistic testimony". In his book Cine argentino: modernidad y vanguardias, 1957/1983, Ricardo Manetti describes the film as having a "rather risky theme for a time marked by censorship".

== See also ==
- List of Argentine films of 1971
