= Venus perseguida =

- Directed by: Aldo Brunelli Ventura
- Starring: Vera Valdor; Juan Carlos Galván
- Release date: 1964
- Country: Argentina
- Language: Spanish

Venus perseguida is an erotic 1964 Argentine film directed by Uruguayan filmmaker Aldo Brunelli Ventura and starring Argentine bombshell and vedette Vera Váldor. Censorship delayed the commercial release of the film until 1973.

== Cast ==
- Vera Váldor
- Juan Carlos Galván
- Lalo Hartich
