= Un amor en Moisés Ville =

2001 film by Daniel Barone and Antonio Ottone

Un Amor en Moisés Ville
- DVD cover
- Directed by: Daniel Barone; Antonio Ottone
- Written by: Antonio Ottone
- Produced by: Nestor Romero
- Starring: Victor Laplace
- Cinematography: Fabián Giacometti
- Release date: 12 April 2001
- Running time: 84 minutes
- Country: Argentina
- Language: Spanish

Un Amor en Moisés Ville (English: A Love in Moisés Ville) is a 2001 Argentine drama film directed by Daniel Barone and written by Antonio Ottone. It stars Victor Laplace, Cipe Lincovsky, Malena Figo, Lautaro Delgado and Jean Pierre Reguerraz. It premiered in Argentina on April 12, 2001.

== Cast ==
- Víctor Laplace as David
- Cipe Lincovsky
- Malena Figo
- Lautaro Delgado
- Jean Pierre Reguerraz
- Noemí Frenkel
- Luisana Lopilato as Guinevere
