= Alberto Fernández de Rosa =

Argentine actor (born 1944)

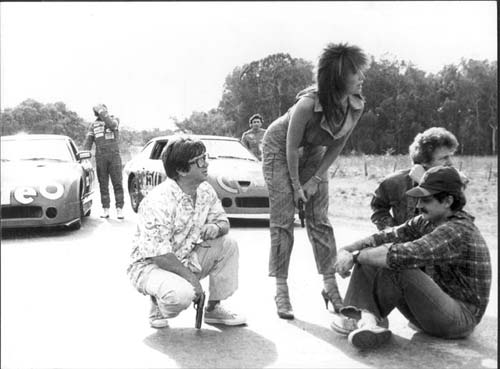
- De Rosa crouched; Moria Casán standing
- Born: 25 April 1944 (age 81); Buenos Aires, Argentina
- Occupation: Actor
- Years active: 1962–present
- Spouse: Cristina Banegas
- Children: 2

Alberto Fernández de Rosa (born 25 April 1944 in Buenos Aires) is an Argentine actor. He has acted on various Argentine films and television series for five decades.

== Career ==
Alberto Fernandez de Rosa began acting as a child. He debuted in theatre at the age of eleven, participating in plays on the Teatro Liceo, under the supervision of playwright Luisa Vehil. While not a prominent actor at first, he struggled until he was finally able to land a job in the television series, 1962's La Familia Falcon (The Falcon Family). At the age of eighteen, de Rosa became a teen idol in Argentina. He made his first movie, El Secreto de Monica" (Monica's Secret), which proved important for de Rosa's acting career, as it exposed him to Spain's public for the first time. He ended that year by participating in El Televisor. In 1963, de Rosa came back to La Familia Falcon, this time, playing the character of Alberto. In 1965, he played Bobby in the comedy film Pajarito Gómez. He followed that work with El Castigador (The Punisher), and 1966's Buenos Aires, Summer 1912 (Buenos Aires in the Summer of 1912), which was a look back at Argentina's capital city during the 1910s. The 22-year-old actor made four films in 1966. Apart from Buenos Aires, Summer 1912, another major movie he made that year was El Bikini Rojo (Red Bikini), which enjoyed success in West Germany as well as in Argentina.

After taking a rest from filming in 1967, de Rosa returned to the screens in 1968, participating in the Italian-Spanish production Il marchio di Kriminal. He had by then moved to Spain. De Rosa lived in Spain for three years, during which he made a total of seventeen films. After returning to Argentina in 1971, de Rosa participated in his first television series, playing Ruben in Niño, las Cosas Simples de la Vida (Boy, Simpler Things in Life). By then, he shifted from being a teen idol to becoming a critically respected actor, both in Argentina and in Spain. After one more movie, de Rosa participated in La Ultima Señora Anderson, a movie that was shown in the United States as Death at the Deep End of the Swimming Pool. La Ultima Señora Anderson was also shown in cinemas in Italy. In some United States markets, the movie was given the title The Fourth Victim. In 1972, he participated in Destino de un Capricho (A Wish's Destiny), then returned to Spain the next year to film the comedy Don Quijote cabalga de nuevo (Don Quijote Rides Again).

De Rosa began 1973 by making another movie, then established himself in West Germany for a small period, having been contracted by an important television network to participate in a sitcom. He acted in 26 episodes of a series named Kara Ben Nemsi Effendi. After that, he returned to Spain, where he made Manolo, la Nuit (Manolo by Night) and two other films before that year was over. In 1974, de Rosa participated in what was arguably his most successful film: El Insolito Embarazo de los Martinez (The Martinez Family's Strange Pregnancy), a comedy movie about a man who became impregnated by his wife. The film was successful both in Spain and Latin America and later on became the inspiration for the Hollywood movie, Junior. In 1974, de Rosa made seven more movies, including Yo la vi Primero, El Reprimido, and Los Nuevos Españoles, which were released in English as I Saw Her First, The Repressed Man, and The New Spaniards, respectively. In 1975, de Rosa acted in the international hit, El poder del deseo ("The Power of Desire"). The film gave de Rosa international exposure, as it was shown in many Hispanic and English-speaking countries. The next year, de Rosa participated in Los Casados y la Menor (The Married Couple and the Minor), Mi Mujer es muy Decente, Dentro de lo que Cabe (My Wife is Decent, Depending on what Decent Is), La Guerra del Cerdo (Diary of a Pig War), and in an episode of a television series named Las Sorpresas (Surprises). In 1976, de Rosa was cast in the horror-comedy film Tiempos Duros Para Dracula" (Hard Tomes for Dracula). He also partook roles in Retrato de Familia (Family Portrait), La Mujer es Cosa de Hombres (Women are for Men), Juan que reía (Juan, the Man That Laughed), and Las Camareras (Female Flight Attendants).

In 1977, de Rosa played Manene in El Monosabio (The Wise Monkey). He was also cast in Caperucita y Roja (She wears a hood and her face is reddened), which was a spoof off the Little Red Riding Hood children's story, plus Estoy Hecho un Chaval (I feel like a Kid Again) and Caledonio y yo Somos Asi (Caledonio and I are Like That). In 1978, de Rosa participated in El Juego del Diablo (Devil's Game), after which he decided to take a voluntary retirement from Argentine screens. He had already, however, become an iconic figure among Argentine actors. When he returned to screen acting in 1981, he acted in Buscando a Perico (Searching for Perico). He also acted in Rocky Carambola, which was an international hit. Rocky Carambola was released in Mexico as Criada se Enamora: La Rocky Carambola (Maid Falls in Love: Rocky Carambola); other countries knew this film as Le Agarro la Mano el Chango (The Monkey Grabbed its Hand). Next for him was Italian release Por Favore, Ocupatti de Amelia (Please, Take Care of Amelia), which was released in Spain as Por Favor, Ocupate de Amelia. 1982 began for de Rosa with another movie Corazon de Papel. Then, he played Alberto Fernandez in La Colmena, which was released in English as The Beehive.

De Rosa returned to Spain in 1983, where he worked on a children's film, Parchis Entra en Accion (Parchis Goes to Action). He then returned to Argentina after that. Back at home, he participated in his first telenovela, Mesa de Noticias (News Table), where he acted as Rosales. He followed that up acting as Eduardo in El Ultimo Kamikaze (The Last Kamikaze), then he acted in Mi Amigo el Vagabundo (My Friend the Homeless), finishing his 1984 screen acting schedule with Dos Mejor que Uno (Two are Better Than One). De Rosa acted in only one film during 1985, Flores Robadas de los Jardines de Quilmes (Flowers stolen from Quilmes' Gardens), but he came back in 1986 to participate in five films, namely Brigada explosiva (Explosive Brigade), once again, playing Rosales. The film is a sequel of Brigada explosiva contra los ninjas, or Explosive Brigade versus Ninjas, Dragon Rapide, where he played General Ordaz, Los Amores de Laurita (Laurita's Loves) and Los Insomnes (Insomniacs). De Rosa made two films in 1987, Los Bañeros más locos del mundo (The Craziest Beach Goers in the World), Los Matamonstruos en la mansion del terror (The Monster Killers at the Horror Mansion). Then, he began 1988 with Los Pilotos mas locos del mundo (The Craziest Pilots in the World, a sequel to Los Bañeros más locos del mundo), which was followed by Soldadito Español (Little Spaniard Soldier), a comedy movie that was directed by Antonio Gimenèz Rico). He finished off 1988 with a small role in Baton Rouge which starred Victoria Abril and Antonio Banderas in one of Banderas' earlier works and where Fernandez de Rosa actually had a job as an extra, playing a card player. In 1989, Fernandez de Rosa returned to Buenos Aires. This would prove to be an important career move for Fernandez de Rosa later on. In Buenos Aires, he became a theater director in the well-known Teatro San Martin. Meanwhile, he acted in a television show named DNI: La Otra Historia (DNI: The Other Story). In 1990, Fernandez de Rosa acted on television only once. He was elected as subsecretary of culture in Buenos Aires, and he returned to screen acting with his participation in "Atame!", which was televised in the United States as "Tie me Up, Tie me Down!". Next came one of the most important acting jobs in Fernandez de Rosa's career: His character in Grande Pa!, Teo, became very popular in Argentina. In Grande Pa! (titled Super Dad in English-speaking countries that televised the show), de Rosa had his first chance of acting alongside Agustina Cherri, who would later on act with Fernandez de Rosa in "Chiquititas". During the early 1990s, Fernandez de Rosa became casting director at Telefe, a job he held in high esteem; he saw his being chosen as casting director at Telefe as a form of respect towards his career as an actor by that company's executive directors. Fernandez de Rosa made one more series in 1991, "Fuera de Juego" ("Offsides"). In 1992, he acted in a Spaniard comedy, "Sevilla Connection". He also participated in "Una Mujer Bajo la Lluvia' ("Woman in the Rain") as "Javier", and in Aqui, el que no Corre...Vuela (Here, He Who Won't Run...Will Fly). De Rosa began 1993 by playing Cairo in Tretas de Mujer (A Woman's Threats). But after Tretas de Mujer, de Rosa was approached by Telefe to begin searching for teenaged actors to be cast in his next show, Chiquititas. He spent 1994 helping Cris Morena prepare the show that would become a megahit internationally.

== Chiquititas ==
"Chiquititas" began to be produced by Telefe, and shown across Argentina and various countries in Latin America, Europe and Asia in 1995. Fernandez de Rosa acted along with the performers he cast for the children's telenovela, including Maria Jimena Piccolo, Facundo Arana, Romina Yan (Morena's daughter) and, as aforementioned, Agustina Cherri. He played "Saverio", a cook who had immigrated from Spain. The fact that Fernandez de Rosa had lived for many years in Spain helped him play "Saverio", who had a Spaniard accent. Playing "Saverio" enabled Fernandez de Rosa to become known among Argentina's younger generations during the 1990s.

"Chiquititas" albums and magazines followed; although Fernandez de Rosa mainly did not participate in these products, he would occasionally be featured on the magazine. When "Chiquititas" began to be shown in the United States on Telefe's satellite network during the 2000s (decade), Fernandez de Rosa started to become famous among Hispanics in that country as well.

== After Chiquititas ==
Fernandez de Rosa slowed down his work as a screen actor considerably after "Chiquititas", concentrating more on his job as casting director for Telefe. In 1996, he played "Augustus Rios" in "Palace". Contrary to previous years, however, Fernandez de Rosa acted in only one new production during 1996.

Already a veteran actor, Fernandez de Rosa once again participated in only one new production in 1997, "24 Horas (Algo Esta por Explotar)" ("24 Hours, Something's About to Explode") a drama-comedy starring Julieta Ortega and Eduardo Cutuli. In "24 Horas (Algo Esta por Explotar)", Fernandez de Rosa also had the opportunity to act alongside well known actress Divina Gloria.

Fernandez de Rosa took 1998 off, then returned to Argentine television in the 1999 soap opera, "La Mujer del Presidente" ("The President's Wife"). After being away for one more year, Fernandez de Rosa joined Guillermo Francella in 2001 during some episodes of Francella's hit series "Pone a Francella" ("Put on Francella").

In 2001, Fernandez de Rosa had an appearance in a film named "Te Besare Mañana" ("I Will Kiss you Tomorrow"). As of 2006, Fernandez de Rosa continued working as a casting director for Telefe.

In 2025, Fernández de Rosa acted in a play named "Mamá" and worked as a director in a school in Argentina.
