= Antonio Ottone =

Argentine film director

- Born: 1941; Santa Fe, Argentina
- Died: March 2, 2002 (aged 60–61); Buenos Aires Argentina
- Occupations: Film director, screenwriter
- Years active: 1985—2001

Antonio Ottone (1941 - 2002) was an Argentine film director, screenwriter and film producer. He presided over the National Institute of Cinematography (1994-1995).

== Filmography ==
- Flores robadas en los jardines de Quilmes (1985)
- Los amores de Laurita (1986)
- Pequeños sinvergüenzas (1990)
- Un Elefante en banda (1990)
- Casi no nos dimos cuenta (1990)
- La Garganta del diablo (1991)
- Un Amor en Moisés Ville (2001)
