= Los amores de Laurita =

1986 film by Antonio Ottone

- Directed by: Antonio Ottone
- Written by: Antonio Ottone; Story: Ana María Shua
- Starring: Alberto Fernández de Rosa
- Cinematography: Diego Bonacina
- Edited by: Diego Gutierrez
- Music by: Jorge Candia
- Release date: September 11, 1986
- Running time: 90 minutes
- Country: Argentina
- Language: Spanish

Los amores de Laurita ("The Loves of Laurita") is a 1986 Argentine drama film written and directed by Antonio Ottone. It is based on the novel by Ana María Shua. The film features Alberto Fernández de Rosa and other notable cast members.

== Synopsis ==
The successive relationships of a woman with the men in her life.

== Cast ==
- Alicia Zanca
- Daniel Fanego
- Manuel Callau
- Raúl Rizzo
- Gustavo Rey
- Alberto Fernández de Rosa
- Horacio Ranieri
- Gustavo Garzón
- Víctor Laplace
- Ana María Caso
- Pablo Brichta
- Margara Alonso
- Alberto Busaid
- Mario Luciani
- Robertino Granados
