= Lydia Lamaison =

Argentine actress

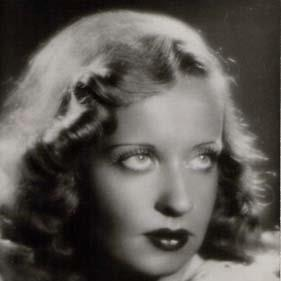
- Born: 5 August 1914; Mendoza, Argentina
- Died: 20 February 2012 (aged 97); Buenos Aires, Argentina
- Occupation: Actress
- Years active: 1939–2012

Lydia Lamaison (5 August 1914 – 20 February 2012) was an Argentine actress. She appeared in 47 films and television shows between 1939 and 2012. She starred in the film La caída, which was entered into the 9th Berlin International Film Festival.

In 1997, Lydia was honored as "Ciudadano Ilustre de la Ciudad de Buenos Aires" ("Illustrious Citizen of the City of Buenos Aires").

== Selected filmography ==
- Alas de mi patria (1939)
- La Caída (1959)
- Fin de fiesta (1960)
- Un Guapo del '900 (1960)
- The Romance of a Gaucho (1961)
- The Last Floor (1962)
- Circe (1964)
- El Ayudante (1971)
- Muñeca brava (1998)
- La puta y la ballena (2004)
