= Poor Butterfly (film) =

1986 film

- Directed by: Raúl de la Torre
- Written by: Raúl de la Torre; Aída Bortnik
- Produced by: Raúl de la Torre
- Starring: Graciela Borges
- Cinematography: Marcelo Camorino
- Edited by: Juan Carlos Macías
- Production companies: Bensil Productions; Raúl de la Torre Producciones
- Release date: 8 May 1986
- Running time: 120 minutes
- Country: Argentina
- Language: Spanish

Poor Butterfly (Spanish: Pobre mariposa) is a 1986 Argentine drama film directed by Raúl de la Torre. It was entered into the 1986 Cannes Film Festival.

== Summary ==
In the mid-1940s, amidst the backdrop of World War II and the emergence of Peronism, a Jewish radio announcer receives the news of her father's death, allegedly as a result of murder.

== Cast ==
- Graciela Borges as Clara
- Lautaro Murúa
- Pepe Soriano as Shloime
- Víctor Laplace as Jose
- Bibi Andersson as Gertrud
- Duilio Marzio
- Cipe Lincovsky as Juana
- Fernando Fernán Gómez
- Ana María Picchio as Irma
- China Zorrilla
- Cacho Fontana
