= María Angélica Bosco =

Argentinean novelist, translator and essayist

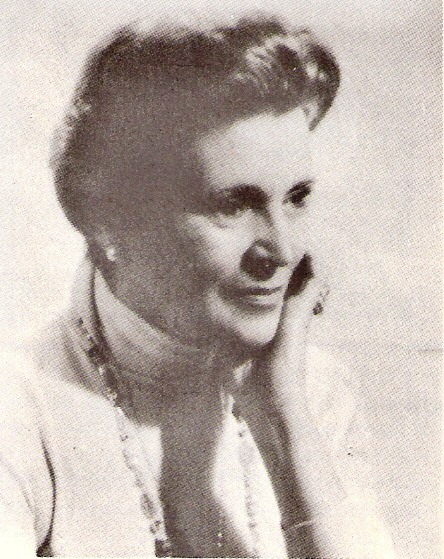
Bosco in 1977

María Angélica Bosco (1917–2006) was an Argentinean novelist, translator and essayist. Her first novel La muerte baja en ascensor (Death Takes the Elevator), won the Emecé Prize in 1954.

== Works ==
- La muerte baja en ascensor [Death Takes the Elevator]. Buenos Aires: Emecé, 1954.
- La muerte soborna a Pandora [Death Bribes Pandora]. Buenos Aires: Emecé, 1956.
- El Comedor de Diario (The(everyday) Dining Room, unlike the formal dining room in large houses, Emecé, 1962
- ¿dónde está el cordero? [Where is the Lamb?]. Buenos Aires: Emecé, 1966.
- Historia privada [Private History]. Buenos Aires: Emecé, 1972.
- Cartas de mujeres [Letters from Women]. Buenos Aires: Emecé, 1975.
- En la estela de un secuestro [In the Wake of a Kidnapping]. Buenos Aires: Emecé, 1977.
- Muerte en la costa del río [Death on the River Shore]. Buenos Aires: Emecé, 1979.
- La muerte vino de afuera [Death Came From Outside]. Buenos Aires: Editorial Belgrano, 1982.
- El sótano [The Basement]. Buenos Aires: Sudamericana, 1986.
- Las burlas del porvenir [The Mockery of the Future]. Buenos Aires: Atlántida, 1993.
- Tres historias de mujeres [Three Stories of Women]. Buenos Aires: Vinciguerra, 1996.
