= Los Velázquez =

- Directed by: Pablo Szir
- Release date: 1972
- Country: Argentina
- Language: Spanish

Los Velázquez is a 1972 Argentine film.

== Cast ==
- Carlos Lagos
- Oscar Vegas
- Martin Coria
- Noemi Manzano
- Hugo Alvarez
- Guerino Marchesi
- Carlos Catalano
- Ricardo Gil Soria
- Jose Andrada
- Sara Bonet
