= Lautaro Murúa =

Chilean-Argentine actor, film director, and screenwriter (1926–1995)

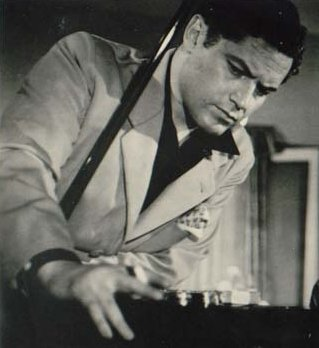
- Lautaro Murúa in 1958
- Born: December 29, 1926; Tacna, Chile
- Died: December 3, 1995 (aged 68); Madrid, Spain

Lautaro Murúa (Spanish pronunciation: [lawˈtaɾo muˈɾu.a]; 29 December 1926 – 3 December 1995) was a Chilean-Argentine actor, film director, and screenwriter. He is considered one of the most recognized figures in Argentine cinema.

Born in Tacna, Chile (now part of Peru), Murúa moved to Argentina in the early 1950s. Before entering the film industry, he studied architecture and fine arts. Although best known for his work as an actor—appearing in over 80 films between 1949 and 1995—he also directed several notable films, including Shunko, Alias Gardelito, and La Raulito, which often addressed social issues.

Murúa was an active participant in the revival of Argentine cinema during the 1960s, working with directors such as Leopoldo Torre Nilsson, Rodolfo Kuhn, Manuel Antín, and David José Kohon.

In the 1970s, he relocated to Spain but returned periodically to Argentina to continue working in film. He died of lung cancer in Madrid in 1995.

== Filmography ==
- 1954 - Confession at Dawn
- 1957 - The House of the Angel (sometimes translated as The End of Innocence)
- 1958 - La caída
- 1958 - Behind a Long Wall
- 1958 - The Kidnapper
- 1960 - The Party Is Over
- 1960 - Shunko
- 1961 - Alias Gardelito
- 1962 - The Venerable Ones
- 1962 - Odd Number
- 1965 - The Amphitheatre
- 1965 - Pajarito Gómez
- 1967 - Traitors of San Angel
- 1969 - Invasión
- 1974 - Quebracho
- 1974 - La Raulito
- 1977 - La Raulito en libertad (Spanish production)
- 1978 - Las truchas
- 1980 - Girl with the Golden Panties
- 1983 - Funny Dirty Little War
- 1984 - Cuarteles de invierno
- 1984 - Gracias por el fuego
- 1986 - Poor Butterfly
- 1993 - A Wall of Silence.
