= Juan José Jusid =

Argentine film director and screenwriter (born 1941)

- Born: September 26, 1941 (age 84); Buenos Aires, Argentina
- Occupations: Film director, screenwriter.
- Spouse: Luisina Brando (ex)
- Children: Federico

Juan José Jusid (born September 26, 1941) is an Argentine film director and screenwriter.

== Career ==
Jusid was born in Buenos Aires. He started his professional career as an actor, puppeteer and stage photographer in the 1960s then switched to film studies at the Association of Short Film Directors.

He turned director and screenwriter in 1968 and has directed acclaimed films such as Bajo Bandera (1997), Un Argentino en New York (1998) and Apasionados (2002).

His films starring actor Miguel Ángel Solá have won a number of Silver Condor awards such as Asesinato en el senado de la nación (1984) and Bajo Bandera (1997).

== Personal life ==
Jusid was married to actress Luisina Brando; they had a son, pianist Federico Jusid.

== Filmography ==
- Eeny, Meeny, Miny, Mo (Tute Cabrero) – 1968
- La fidelidad – 1970
- The Jewish Gauchos (Los gauchos judíos) – 1975
- No toquen a la nena – 1976
- Keep Waiting for Me (Espérame mucho) – 1983
- Murder in the Senate (Asesinato en el senado de la nación) – 1984
- Made in Argentina – 1987
- Where Are You My Love, That I Cannot Find You? (¿Dónde estás amor de mi vida que no te puedo encontrar?) – 1992
- Muerte dudosa – 1994
- Under Flag (Bajo bandera) – 1997
- An Argentinian in New York (Un Argentino en New York) – 1998
- The Damned Rib (Esa maldita costilla) – 1999
- Daddy Is My Idol (Papá es un ídolo) – 2000
- Passionate People (Apasionados) – 2002
- Ensayo – 2003, TV miniseries
- Santa Calls – 2005, TV miniseries
- My Days with Gloria (Mis días con Gloria) – 2010
- Intolerancia – 2010, short film
- Historias de diván – 2013, TV miniseries
- Viaje inesperado – 2018

== General references ==
- Núñez, María (1994). Juan José Jusid (in Spanish). Centro Editor de América Latina. ISBN 978-950-25-3165-6.
