= Raúl de la Torre =

Argentine film director, screenwriter and film producer

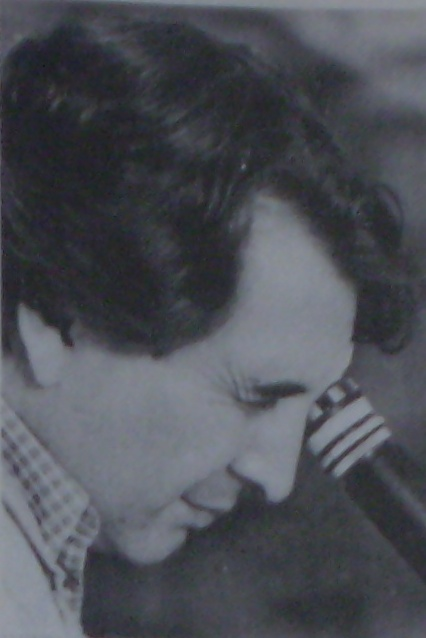
- Born: February 19, 1938; Zárate, Buenos Aires, Argentina
- Died: March 19, 2010 (aged 72)
- Years active: 1951–1995

Raúl de la Torre (19 February 1938, in Zárate – 19 March 2010, in Buenos Aires) was an Argentine film director screenwriter and film producer.

He was nominated for a Palme d'Or at the 1986 Cannes Film Festival for the film Pobre mariposa.

== Filmography as director ==
- Juan Lamaglia y señora (1970)
- Crónica de una señora (1971)
- Heroine (1972)
- La Revolución (1973)
- Sola (1976)
- El Infierno tan temido (1980)
- Pubis Angelical (1982)
- Pobre mariposa (1986)
- Color escondido (1988)
- Funes, un gran amor (1993)
- Peperina (1995)
