= Víctor Laplace =

Argentinian film actor

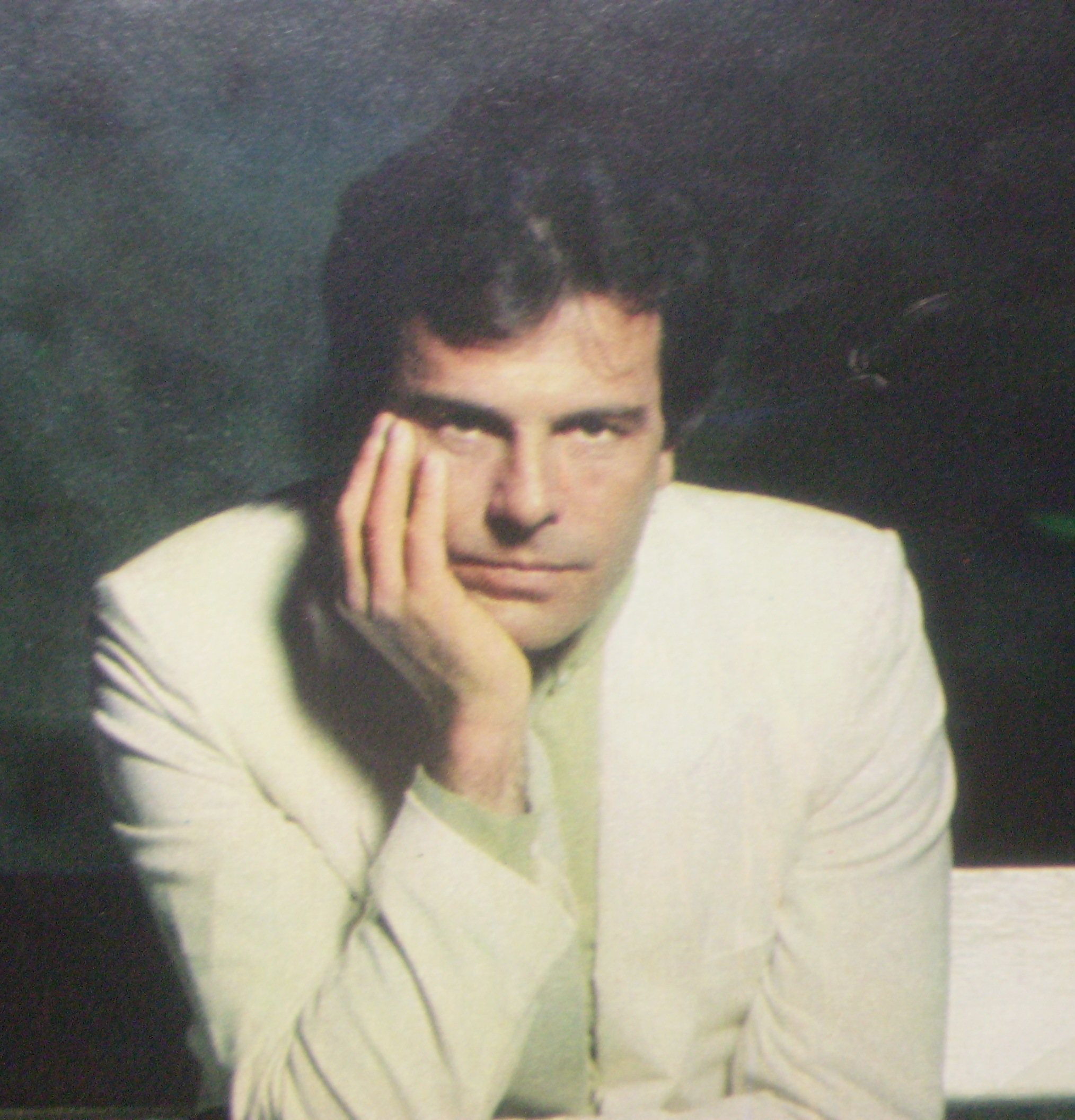
- Victor Laplace in 1982
- Born: 30 May 1943; Tandil, Buenos Aires
- Occupation: Actor

Víctor Laplace (born 30 May 1943) is an Argentine film actor.

== Biography ==
Laplace was born in Tandil, Buenos Aires. The son of a watchmaking jeweler and a housewife. When he was 14, he started working as a metallurgist in a factory, there he also recited Shakespeare poems. When he was 18, he left the family for Buenos Aires and the theatre.

He has appeared in over 80 films since 1970, including Eva Perón: The True Story (1996, in which he portrayed President Juan Perón) and Un Amor en Moisés Ville in 2001, as well as extensive local and international theatre credits. He has also directed six films.

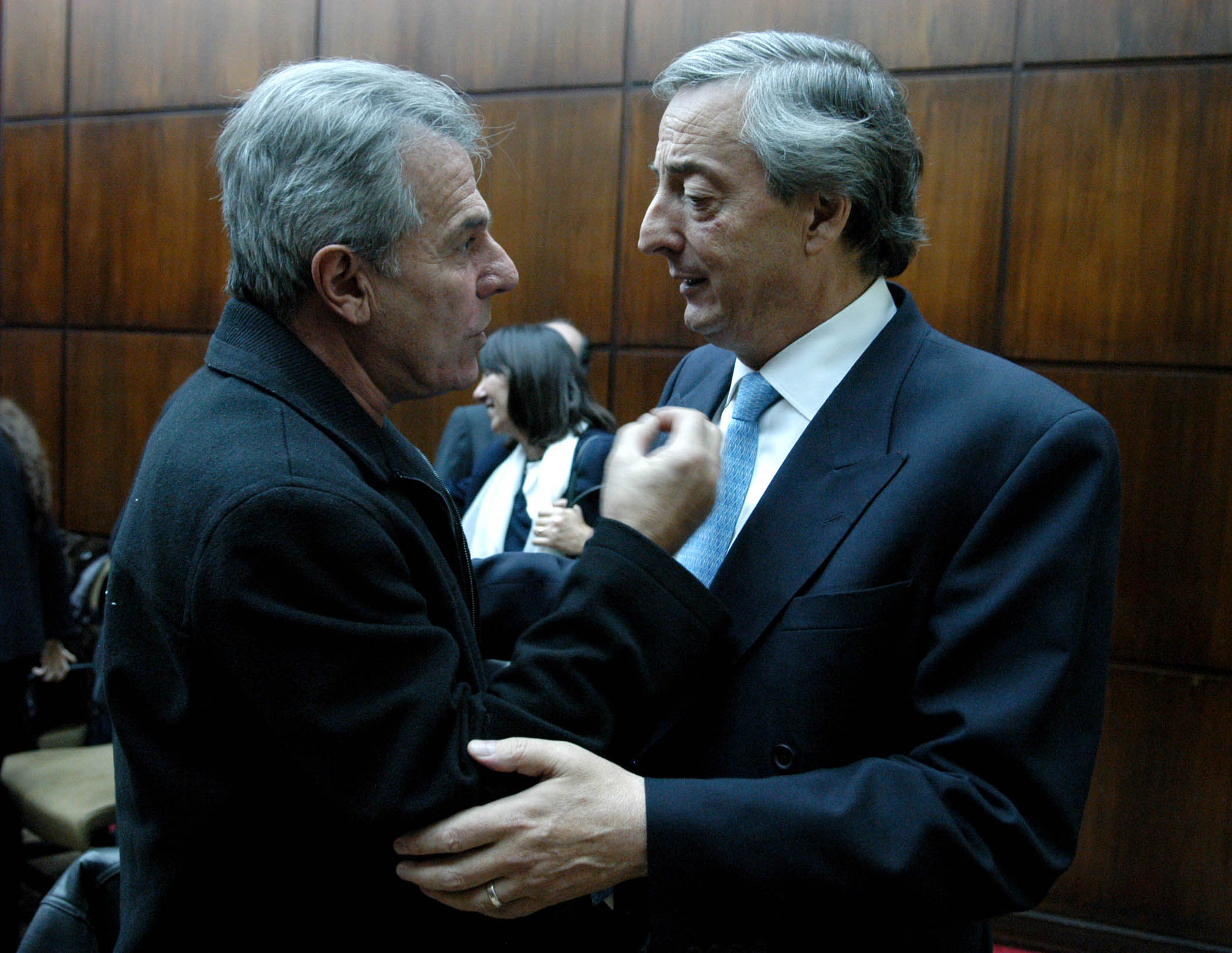
Víctor Laplace (left) and President Néstor Kirchner, 2007.

In 1971, he had a relationship with Renata Schussheim, which produced his son, Damián.

He later became the partner of Nelida Lobato a dancer and actress, who accompanied him into exile when he left Buenos Aires, after being threatened by the Triple A.

== Filmography ==
1. Puerta de Hierro
2. Los Exitosos Perez (2009)- Alfonso Duarte
3. Detrás del sol, más cielo (2007) - Antón
4. Angelelli, la palabra viva (2007)
5. Costo argentino (2004) (episodio "Estado de sitio")
6. La mina (2003) - Don Sebastián
7. Mate Cosido, el bandolero fantasma (2003)
8. I love you... Torito (2001) - Voz en off
9. El fuego y el soñador (inédita - 2001) - Esposo de Nora
10. Casi ángeles (2000) - Dr. Tossi (episodio "Perdidos")
11. El amor y el espanto (2000) - Carlos Daneri
12. Un amor en Moisés Ville (2000) - David adulto
13. El mar de Lucas (1999) - Juan Denevi
14. Cerca de la frontera (1999)
15. Peligro nuclear (inédita - 1999)
16. Pozo de zorro (1998)
17. Doña Bárbara (1998)
18. Secretos compartidos (1998) - Vicente Duarte
19. Sin reserva (1997)
20. Comodines (1997) - Julio Lizarraga
21. Eva Perón (1996) - Juan Domingo Perón
22. Lola Mora (1995)
23. Historias de amor, de locura y de muerte (1994)
24. Convivencia (1994)
25. El camino de los sueños (1993)
26. La garganta del diablo (inédita - 1993)
27. Flop (1990) - Florencio Parravicini
28. La amiga (1989) - Diego
29. Nunca estuve en Viena (1989) - Don Francisco
30. Después del último tren (inédita - 1989)
31. Letters from the Park (1988)
32. Mamá querida (1988)
33. Extrañas salvajes (1988)
34. Chorros (1987) - Pablo Ferrán
35. Sentimientos (1987)
36. Debajo del mundo (1987)
37. Los dueños del silencio (1987) - Padre Raimundo
38. Los amores de Laurita (1986)
39. Chechechela, una chica de barrio (1986)
40. Expreso à la emboscada (1986) - Padre Cesáreo
41. Pobre mariposa (1986)
42. Te amo (1986) - Padre de Valeria
43. Sin querer, queriendo (1985) - Pédro Ávila
44. El rigor del destino (1985)
45. Flores robadas en los jardines de Quilmes (1985)
46. Los días de junio (1985) - Abaurréa
47. El caso Matías (1985)
48. Adiós, Roberto (1985)
49. Gracias por el fuego (1983)
50. No habrá más penas ni olvido (1983) - Reinaldo
51. Se acabó el curro (1983)
52. Espérame mucho (1983)
53. El poder de la censura (1983)
54. Una mujer (1975)
55. La guerra del cerdo (1975)
56. Los gauchos judíos (1974)
57. La malavida (1973) - Julio, el oriental
58. Vení conmigo (1972)
59. Operación Masacre (1972) - Carlos Lizaso
60. La Sartén por el mango (1972)
61. Disputas en la cama (1972)
62. Pájaro loco (1971)
63. Argentino hasta la muerte (1971)
64. Muerte dudosa
