= Lisandro Fiks =

Argentine director, playwright, actor and musician

- Born: Lisandro Fiks; 15 October 1971 (age 54); Buenos Aires, Argentina
- Education: Escuela de Música Popular de Avellaneda (EMPA)
- Occupations: Actor; director; producer; composer; musician
- Years active: 1989–present

Lisandro Fiks (born in Buenos Aires on 15 October 1971) is an Argentine director, actor, playwright and musician.

Among his plays are: 1982, Obertura solemne, 25 millones de argentinos, Un enemigo del pueblo, Extra virgen, Mala Praxis and Hombres y ratones.

For fourteen years he was part of the musical-theatrical group Los Amados.

Fiks mainly studied acting with Augusto Fernandes for twelve years (2007-2018) and directing for 9 years (2009-2017). Additional studies with Julio Chávez; Beatriz Spelzini; Berta Goldenberg and Silvia Kanter.

== Theatre ==
Plays in which he participated:

- Extra Virgen (Playwright, Composer, Stage Director, Director)
- Hombres y ratones (Adaptation, Lightning Design, Actor, Director)
- Un enemigo del pueblo (Adaptation, Translation, Composer, Director)
- Camuflaje! (Actor)
- Leia (Actor)
- El avaro (Actor)
- 25 millones de argentinos (Playwright, Lightning Design, Actor, Director)
- 1938. Un asunto criminal (Artistic Collaboration, Voice in off)
- El toque de un poeta (Actor)
- Mala Praxis (Playwright, Actor, Director)
- Arizona (Actor)
- 1982, Obertura solemne (Playwright, Actor, Director)
- Los Amados: El danzón (Musician, musical director)
- Dos (una obra despareja) (Actor)
- Los Amados, románticos y enamorados (Performer, musical director)
- Los Amados y la Orquesta de la UBA: Homenaje a la música latinoamericana (Musician, musical director)
- Rutilantes (musical director)
- Karabali, ensueño Lecuona (Musician, Musical Arrangements, musical director)
- Panama´s Affaire (Musician, musical director)

== Movie appearances ==
Fiks appeared on the big screen or collaborated in:

- La ira de Dios
- The Two Popes
- La Noche de 12 Años
- Lala, Composer

== TV appearances ==
On TV he appeared in, among others:

- Argentina, tierra de amor y venganza
- Soy Luna
- Guapas

== Awards ==
Among the numerous awards, which Fiks received, the most important distinctions were in 2017 and in 2015, when the honorable Senate of Argentina declared his plays of Cultural Interest:

- 25 millones de Argentinos
- 1982, Obertura solemne

7 wins out of 15 nominations

Year	Award	Category	Nominated Work	Result
2020	Estrella de Mar Award	Best Drama and/or dramatic Comedy	Extra Virgen	Nominated
2019	ACE Award	Best Director of Alternative Theatre	Hombres y ratones	Nominated
2019	José María Vilches Award	Best Play of the Year	Un enemigo del pueblo	Won
2019	Premio Provincial de Teatro	Best National Play presented in Córdoba	Un enemigo del pueblo	Won
2018	ACE Award	Best Drama and/or dramatic Comedy, Adaptation & Translation	Un enemigo del pueblo	Won
2018	ACE Award	Best Director	Un enemigo del pueblo	Nominated
2018	ACE Award	Best original Score	Un enemigo del pueblo	Nominated
2018	Estrella de Mar Award	Best Drama and/or dramatic Comedy, Adaptation & Translation	Un enemigo del pueblo	Won
2018	Estrella de Mar Award	Best Director	Un enemigo del pueblo	Nominated
2018	Estrella de Mar Award	Best original Score	Un enemigo del pueblo	Nominated
2018	Teatro del Mundo Award	Best Translation	Un enemigo del pueblo	Won
2018	Teatro del Mundo Award	Best Adaptation	Un enemigo del pueblo	Won
2017	Trinidad Guevara Award	Best Playwright	25 millones de argentinos	Won
2016	María Guerrero Award	Best Argentine Playwright	25 millones de argentinos	Nominated
2010	Premios Hugo al Teatro Musical	Best Musical Arrangement	Los Amados - Karabalí, ensueño Lecuona	Nominated

== Shared Awards ==
The following Awards are shared with all of the members of Los Amados (2003–2012).

6 wins out of 7 nominations

Year	Award	Category	Nominated Work	Result
2012	Premios Gardel	Best Melodic-Romantic Album	Los Amados - El Danzón	Won
2009	ACE Award	Best Music Hall	Los Amados - Karabalí, ensueño Lecuona	Won
2009	Teatro del Mundo Award	Best Musical Performance	Los Amados - Karabalí, ensueño Lecuona	Won
2007	Florencio Sánchez Award	Best Humoristic Music Show	Los Amados - Rutilantes	Won
2007	Premios Gardel	Best Melodic-Romantic Album	Los Amados - Rutilantes	Nominated
2006	ACE Award	Best Café Concert Show	Los Amados - Clásicos Amados en Clásica	Won
2003	Estrella de Mar Award	Best Humoristic Show	Los Amados - Pecar de Pensamiento	Won

== Discography ==
Year	Title	Artist	Instrument(s) & Credits	Record label
2019	Triángulo de Fuerza	Attaque 77	Trombone - Arrangement of Winds	Sony Music – 8898 538031 2, Ariola – 8898 538031 2
2016	Long Play	Gady Pampillón y La 4x4	Double bass	Fonocal - B01ECL3G12
2012	Acústico - Teatro Opera - Bs. As. - Argentina	Attaque 77	Double bass - Arrangement and Direction of Strings	Sony Music – 547839
2012	Voilà!	La Impertinente Señorita Orquesta	Double bass	Club del Disco
2011	El Danzón	Los Amados	Double bass, electric bass guitar, guitar, flute - Production, Musical Direction and Arrangements	ACQUA Records - AQ304
2010	Aún	esonoes	Double bass, Trombone, corneta, Guitar, Vocals, Backing Vocals – Composition, Production & Arrangements	ACQUA Records - AQ259
2010	Una celebración del rock argentino CD #5 Song: Cantata de puentes amarillos	Papanegra	Double bass & Vocals, Backing Vocals	Melopea - CDMSE 5172
2007	Rulilantes	Los Amados	Double bass, Trombone, Backing Vocals – Production, Musical Direction & Arrangements	ACQUA Records - AQ145
2004	Celesteacusticados!	Celeste Carballo	Double bass	EMI - 7249 866278 2 7
2002	Balvanera	Jorge Retamoza & Tango XXX	Double bass	P.A.I. - 3061
1999	Policial argentino	Jorge Retamoza & Tango XXX	Double bass	P.A.I. - 3032
1995	Jorge Pinchevsky y la SAMOVAR BIG BAND	Jorge Pinchevsky y la SAMOVAR BIG BAND	Double bass	DBN - 51414

== Books ==
- "Un enemigo del pueblo" Ibsen/Fiks, Colección "Reescrituras argentinas" Editorial Los libros del espectador. Con el auspicio de la Real Embajada de Noruega. ISBN 978-987-48040-0-6
- MALVINAS II, "1982 obertura solemne" Colección Dramaturgia Argentina, Ediciones del CCC, ISBN 978-987-3920-52-3
