= List of Argentine films of 1985 =

A list of films produced in Argentina in 1985:

== 1985 ==
| Title | Director | Actors | Genre | Notability |
|---|---|---|---|---|
1985
| Adiós, Roberto | Enrique Dawi | Victor Laplace | | |
| Barbarian Queen | Héctor Olivera | Lana Clarkson | | |
| Bairoletto | | Arturo Bonín, Luisina Brando, Camila Perissé, Franklin Caicedo, Rudy Chernicoff, María Vaner, Augusto Larreta, Jorge Velurtas, Raúl Florido, Oscar Arrese | Historical documentary | |
| La Búsqueda | | | | |
| Los Días de junio | | | | |
| Cocaine Wars | Héctor Olivera | | | |
| La Cruz invertida | Mario David | | | |
| Contar hasta diez | Oscar Barney Finn | | | Entered into the 35th Berlin International Film Festival |
| La Vieja música | Mario Camus | Federico Luppi, Charo López, Antonio Resines, Assumpta Serna | Comedy | With Spain |
| El Rigor del destino | Gerardo Vallejo | | | Entered into the 14th Moscow International Film Festival |
| Luna caliente | | | | |
| Mingo y Aníbal contra los fantasmas | | | | |
| Esperando la carroza | Alejandro Doria | Antonio Gasalla, Luis Brandoni, Betiana Blum, China Zorrilla, etc. | Comedy | |
| Flores robadas en los jardines de Quilmes | | | | |
| La Historia oficial | Luis Puenzo | Héctor Alterio, Norma Aleandro | Drama | Academy Award winner, screened at the 1985 Cannes Film Festival |
| Hay unos tipos abajo | | | | |
| Wizards of the Lost Kingdom | Hector Olivera | Bo Svenson, Vidal Peterson, Thom Christopher, Barbara Stock, María Socas | Fantasy | |
| Por una tierra nuestra | | | | |
| Quien pelea | | | | |
| Black Octopus | | | | |

== External links and references ==
- Argentine films of 1985 at the Internet Movie Database
