= Mónica Villa =

Argentine actress

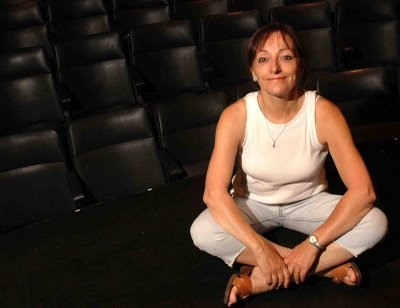
- Mónica Villa at Picadilly Theatre, before a rehearsal
- Born: Mónica Villa; 16 December 1954 (age 71); Buenos Aires, Argentina
- Occupation: actress
- Years active: 1976–present

Mónica Villa (born 16 December 1954) is an Argentine actress of stage, screen, and TV, as well as a researcher and educator. She earned a Best Actress award for her role as "Susana" in cult classic Waiting for the Hearse at the 1985 Festival de Cine Iberoamericano, in Huelva, Spain. She won an ACE Golden award for best leading actress in the 2002 comedy "Ojos traidores", a 2004 Premios Trinidad Guevara for best Actress of a Repertoire Company, a Premios Carlos de Oro for her 2011 performance as best lead actress in the theater production "Jardín De Otoño", and in 2015 a Premios Estrella de Mar for Best Female Performance in a Repertoire Company for "La Nona". In addition, she has been nominated for a Best Actress in a TV Special for the 2003 Premios Martín Fierro, making her acting work recognized in all three major media.

She was the first actor in Argentina to earn a master's degree and has published and had performed an opera for children. In addition, she has written and performed in the play “Raren bicho raro”.

== Biography ==
Mónica Villa was born 16 December 1954 in Buenos Aires, Argentina. She grew up in Villa Urquiza and dreamed of becoming a veterinarian or guitar player. At 13 or 14, she changed directions and began to pursue acting. She began to study acting and enrolled in the classes of Hedy Crilla. In an unusual move for Argentinian actors, she enrolled in the Argentine and Latin American Theater Program at Buenos Aires University (UBA) and qualified for the master's degree in Argentine and Latin American Theater, with a thesis titled "José González Castillo, Militante de lo Popular". She became the first actor to attain a master's degree in Argentina in 2011 and has plans to publish her thesis as a book.

=== Theater work ===
Villa made her theater debut in 1974 as Nancy in the comedy "The Knack", written by British playwright Ann Jellicoe directed by Augustín Alezzo. In 1976, she acted in the play "Como quien dice Adellach" in the Teatro de La Fábula in Buenos Aires under the direction of Rolando Revagliatti. In 1980, Villa had a starring role in "Fando y Lys" and her performance was well received leading to additional work in the theater and television offers. She participated in 1982 in both the production of "El estupendo cornudo" at the Museo del Cine Pablo C. Ducrós Hicken, and the Teatro Abierto in "Prohibido no pisar el cesped" by Rodolfo Paganini, After a five-year break for TV and film, in 1987 she performed in "Gasalla es el Maipo y el Maipo es Gasalla" with Antonio Gasalla and "Dando pasos".

After her son was born, Villa took a hiatus from theater for about a decade. When she returned in 1998, her first presentation was "Rarem bicho raro", a comedy which she co-wrote with Silvia Kanter. In 2002, she performed in "Ojos traidores" for which she won an ACE de Oro for Best Comedy Actress. In 2004 and 2005, Villa performed in "De cirujas, putas y suicidas" for which she won the 2004 Premios Trinidad Guevara for best Actress of a Repertoire Company. She received praise for her performance in "Pan de piedra" from 2007 and the comedy "8 mujeres", which began touring in 2011 and performed around the country through 2012.

In 2011, she performed "Jardín De Otoño", for which she won Best Lead Actress in a Drama from Carlos de Oro Awards. When Mujers ended, Villa began touring "La Nona". In 2015, she was nominated for a Premios Estrella de Mar for Best Female Performance in a Repertoire Company for it and won the award.

=== TV work ===
In 1981, Villa began performing in a series of Specials for ATC, including episodes "Sanatorium", "Una cuestión de familia" and "Abuso de confianza". In 1986, she performed in "Soñar sin Límite" and participated in TV specials like "Chantecler" and "Los especiales de Alejandro Doria". She also played in weekly serials including "Atreverse", "Fiscales", and "Chiquititas", among many others, as she preferred to work in television while she was on hiatus from the theater and raising her son. She also worked in episodes of "Los Simuladores", one of which she was nominated as Best Actress in a TV Special for the 2003 Premios Martín Fierro.

=== Film work ===
"El pasajero del jardín" (1982), "El desquite" (1983), and "Darse cuenta" (1984) were Villa's first three films. With her fourth film, she earned popular acclaim as "Susana" in cult movie "Esperando la Carroza" (1985) filmed by Alejandro Doria, for which she won the Best Actress Award at the XI Festival de Cine Iberoamericano, in Huelva, Spain—a corollary prize was awarded to American actor William Hurt in that year's edition of the festival. The film has been called the "most important film made by the National Cinema" and in fact, the sequel was not filmed as long as Alejandro Doria was living, as he did not want to "compete with a myth". The sequel, "Esperando la carroza 2" was released after his death, in 2009, 23 years after the original film.

In 1985, Villa co-starred in "Tacos Altos" directed by Sergio Renán. In 1993, she played "Señora Zamildio" with Italian actor Marcelo Mastroianni in "De Eso no se Habla" written by María Luisa Bemberg. In 2004 she made "Niña santa" directed by Lucrecia Martel and in 2010 she appeared in "Largo viaje del día hacia la noche". The film was shot with minimal equipment and relied primarily on its staging and the talent of its leading trio of actors. In 2014 she participated in the film, "Wild Tales" directed by Damián Szifrón. In 2024 she led the Independent Spirit Award nominated US-Argentine film Chronicles of a Wandering Saint.

=== Other artistic endeavors ===
Villa wrote an opera for children, “Tortita” (Cupcake), which was staged in 1983. It was co-authored by Marta Merajver-Kurlat and the score was written by the late composer Carlos Constantini. The set was designed by Rosa Buk and it was performed under the direction of Jorge Roca at the Teatro El Vitral, in Buenos Aires.

In an effort to help rising young actors, Villa also teaches. She has offered seminars on the "History of Argentine Theater" for the Sociedad Argentina de Gestión de Actores Intérpretes (SAGAI) (Management Company of Argentinean Interpretive Actors), and at La Casa de Moreira.

== Personal life ==
Villa is an amateur sculptor and enjoys music, the arts, cooking, and gardening. She is married and has one son, Francisco.

== Awards ==
- "Esperando la carroza" (1985) WON Best Actress Special Prize, XI Festival de Cine Iberoamericano de Huelva
- "Ojos traidores" (2002) WON Best Comedy Actress, ACE Awards
- "Los simuladores" (2003) Best Actress in a TV Special, nominated Martín Fierro Award
- "De cirujas, putas y suicidas" (2004) WON Best Actress of a Repertoire Company, Trinidad Guevara Award
- "Jardín De Otoño", (2011) WON Best Lead Actress in a Drama, Carlos de Oro
- "La Nona" (2015) WON Best Female Performance in a Repertoire Company, Estrella de Mar Award

== Performance ==
=== Film ===
- “Los pasajeros del jardín” (1982)
- “El desquite ” (1983) … Nancy
- “Darse cuenta” (1984) … Gladys
- “Esperando la carroza” (1985) … Susana
- “Tacos altos” (1985) … Porota
- “Correccional de mujeres” (1986) … Lucila Expósita
- “Sofía” (1987)
- “De eso no se habla” (1993)
- “La niña santa” (2004) … Madre de Josefina
- “Esperando la carroza 2” (2009) … Susana De Musicardi
- “Toda la gente sola” (2009) … Ana
- “Miss Tacuarembó” (2010) … Mónica
- “Antes del estreno” (2011) … Patricia
- “Doria” (2012) … Entrevistada
- "Wild Tales" (2014)

Chronicles of a Wandering Saint (film) (2023) Ritahttps://www.hoperunshighfilms.com/chronicles-of-a-wandering-saint

=== Theater ===
- “Como quien dice Adellach” (1976)
- “Fando y Lys” (1980)
- “El estupendo cornudo” (1982)
- “Prohibido no pisar el césped” (1982)
- “Gasalla es el Maipo y el Maipo es Gasalla” (1987)
- “Dando pasos” (1987)
- “Raren bicho raro” (1998) Author and Actress
- “Ojos traidores” (2002)
- “Narcisa Garay, mujer para llorar” (2004)
- “De cirujas, putas y suicidas” (2004-2005)
- “Te voy a matar, mamá” (2005) Director and Actress
- “Eleonora y el gangster” (2006)
- “Chicas católicas” (2007)
- “Pan de piedra” (2007)
- “La bolsa de agua caliente” -Ciclo "Homenaje a Carlos Somigliana" (2007)
- “Divas” (2008)
- “Olivo” (2008-2009)
- “Julio César (Kasca)” -Ciclo "Teatrísimo"- (2009)
- “Chicas católicas” (2010)
- "Jardín de Otoño" (2011)
- “ 8 mujeres” (2011-2012)
- “La Nona” (2015)

=== Television ===
- Los especiales de ATC -Episode: "Sanatorium"- *ATC* (1981)
- Los especiales de ATC -Episode: "Una cuestión de familia"- *ATC* (1981)
- Los especiales de ATC -Episode: "Abuso de confianza" (Mucama)- *ATC* (1981)
- Historia de un trepador *Canal 13* (1984)
- Soñar sin límite *ATC* (1986) ...Conducción
- No va más (la vida nos separa) *Canal 9* (1988)
- La pensión de la Porota *Telefe* (1990) ...Alfreda
- Atreverse *Telefe* (1990-1992)
- Sex a pilas *Canal 13* (1992)
- Casi todo, casi nada *Canal 13* (1993)
- La piñata *Telefe* (1994)
- Nueve lunas *Canal 13* (1994-1995)
- Los especiales de Doria -Episode: "Historia de un amor turbio"- *Telefe* (1996)
- Los especiales de Doria -Episode: "La salud de los enfermos"- *Telefe* (1996)
- El Rafa *Telefe* (1997)
- Los especiales de Doria -Episode: "Comunico milagros"- *Canal 13* (1998)
- Los especiales de Doria -Episode: "El santo diablo"- *Canal 13* (1998)
- Fiscales *Telefe* (1998)
- Chiquititas *Telefe* (1998) ...Martirio
- Los médicos (de hoy) 2 *Canal 13* (2001)
- Kachorra *Telefe* (2002) ...Madre Juana
- Contrafuego *Canal 9* (2002)
- Los simuladores -Episode: "Z 9000"- *Telefe* (2003)
- Un cortado *Canal 7* (2004)
- Culpable de este amor *Telefe* (2004) ...Olga Zamudio
- Numeral 15 -Episode: "Sin crédito"- *Telefe* (2005)
- Mujeres asesinas -Episode: "Margarita, la maldita"- *Canal 13* (2005)
- Mujeres asesinas -Episode: "Cándida, esposa improvisada"- *Canal 13* (2005)
- Mujeres asesinas -Episode: "Isabel, enfermera"- *Canal 13* (2006)
- Se dice amor *Telefe* (2006) ...Tita
- La ley del amor *Telefe* (2007) ...Sonia
- Malparida *Canal 13* (2010) ...Olga Domisi
