= Villanueva Cosse =

Uruguayan actor and theater director (born 1933)

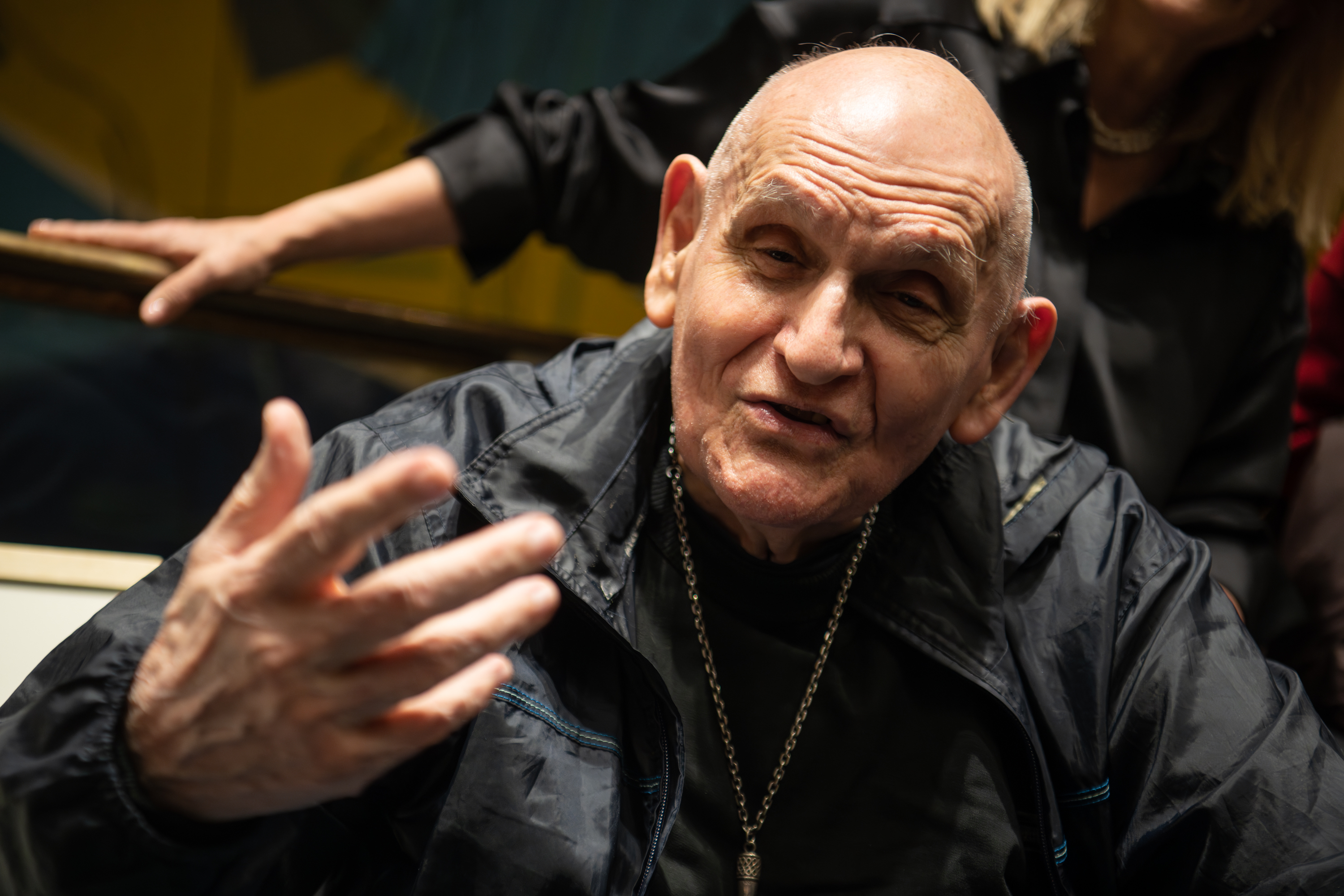
- Cosse in 2023
- Born: Villanueva Félix Cosse Vega; 9 November 1933 (age 92); Melo, Uruguay
- Education: Multidisciplinary School of Dramatic Art
- Occupations: Actor, theater director, writer
- Children: Carolina Cosse
- Awards: Florencio Award (1969, 1970, 1972); ACE Award (2001, 2009)

Villanueva Félix Cosse Vega (born 9 November 1933) is a Uruguayan actor, theater director, and writer who has developed a distinguished career in his country and internationally, especially in Argentina, where he has lived since 1973.

== Biography ==
Villanueva Cosse is the father of Carolina Cosse, former Intendant of Montevideo and current Vice President of Uruguay.

He began his theatrical training at the Teatro El Galpón in Montevideo in 1953, continued his studies at the Multidisciplinary School of Dramatic Art (EMAD) in Montevideo until graduating in 1963, and attended Jacques Lecoq's School of Mime and Theater in Paris.

Since 1956 he has performed in more than 60 plays in Uruguay and Argentina, taken part in 20 feature films, and in numerous television series and specials.

In 1963, 1972, 1985, and 1996 he directed 11 plays at El Galpón, Teatro Circular, Teatro del Centro, Club de Teatro, and the Comedia Nacional in Montevideo.

He wrote the musical comedy ¿Quién le teme a Lucila Singer?, performed at the Embassy Theater; Feria del miedo, del amor y de la guerra, performed at the San Martín Theater; Compañero del alma in co-authorship with Adriana Genta, edited by Torres Agüero (1992), and performed at La Campana and El Galpón theaters. He adapted Servant of Two Masters (Goldoni), Lysistrata (Aristophanes), and The Government Inspector (Gogol).

Cosse participated, as author and director, in international tours and festivals in Buenos Aires, Zurich, Caracas, Montevideo, New York, Mexico City, San Juan, Milan, and Stockholm, making presentations for El Galpón, Théatre Ecole, Open Theater, Cervantes National Theater, San Martín Theater, and People's Theater, among others.

In Argentina he worked as an actor and director – in 1975, in Querido Mentiroso as George Bernard Shaw, antagonist of China Zorrilla in the role of Mrs Patrick Campbell, and then directing Servant of Two Masters, produced by the actress.

Of his extensive career as a theater director, his most notable productions include Marat/Sade by Peter Weiss, Bohemian Lights by Ramón del Valle-Inclán, Long Day's Journey into Night by Eugene O'Neill, Cocinando con Elisa by Lucía Laragione, New York by Daniel Dalmaroni, and Marathon by Ricardo Monti.

== Filmography ==
- Proceso a la infamia (1978) ... Rafael Barca
- Los superagentes no se rompen (1979)
- Señora de nadie (1982) ... Miguel
- Espérame mucho (1983)
- En retirada (1984) ... Funcionario
- Asesinato en el Senado de la Nación (1984) ... Don Alberto
- A King and His Movie (1986) ... Desfontaine
- The Loves of Kafka (1988)
- País cerrado, teatro abierto (1990) ... Él mismo
- Dios los cría (1991)
- ¿Dónde estás, amor de mi vida, que no te puedo encontrar? (1992)
- El caso María Soledad (1993) ... El Obispo
- ¿Le molestaría si le hago una pregunta? (1994, short film)
- Plaza de Almas (1997)
- América mía (1998) ...Degollador
- Foolish Heart (1998)
- Héroes y demonios (1999) ... Dr. Delfini
- Yepeto (1999) ... Don Gerardo
- El lugar donde estuvo el paraíso (2001)

== Television ==
- Black Octopus (1985)
- Verano del '98 (1998)
- Los Simuladores (2002)
- Epitafios (2004)
- Mujeres Asesinas (2006, episode "Lucía, memoriosa")

== Theatrical productions ==
- Marat/Sade (adaptation, director)
- Príncipe azul (actor)
- Déjala sangrar (actor)
- Segovia (or De la poesía) (actor, director)
- Lisandro (translation, costumer)
- La Feria del miedo, el amor y la guerra (author)
- Copias (actor)
- Toque de queda (actor)
- Te llevo en la sangre (director)
- The Inspector (director)
- Mein Kampf, farsa (performer)
- Bohemian Lights (director)
- Cocinando con Elisa (director)
- Compañero del alma (author, actor, director)
- ¡Arriba, corazón! (performer)
- Feria del miedo, del amor y de la guerra (author, director)
- Cuatro caballetes (performer)
- Blues de la calle Balcarce (director)
- Acto cultural (actor)
- Espectros (actor)

== Awards ==
=== Theater ===
==== Uruguay ====
- 1969: Florencio Award for Best Director for Servant of Two Masters
- 1970: Florencio Award for Best Supporting Actor for King Lear
- 1972: Florencio Award for Best Actor for Arturo Ui
- 2017: Declared an Illustrious Citizen of Montevideo Department

==== Argentina ====
- 1973: Talía for Best Foreign Actor for Arturo Ui
- 1974/75: Estrella de mar for Best Director for Servant of Two Masters
- 1985/86: Estrella de mar for Best Lead Actor for Príncipe Azul
- 1985/86: José María Vilches for Best Lead Actor for Príncipe Azul
- 1988: María Guerrero for Best Director for Compañero del alma
- 1987/88: García Lorca Biennial Theatrical Event for Compañero del alma
- 1991/92: Municipal Award of the City of Buenos Aires for Best Independent Theatrical Production Doña Ramona
- 1997/98: Leónidas Barletta for Best Independent Theatrical Production Cocinando con Elisa
- 1998: Trinidad Guevara nominee for Best Director for Cocinando con Elisa
- 1999: ACE Award nominee for Best Director for Bohemian Lights
- 2000: ACE Award nominee for Best Supporting Actor for Mein Kampf
- 2001: ACE Award for Best Director for The Inspector
- 2009: ACE Award for Best Director for Marat/Sade

=== Film ===
- 1985: Junior Award for Best National Supporting Actor for Asesinato en el Senado de la Nación
- 1987: Silver Condor Award from the Argentine Association of Cinema Critics, Best Supporting Actor for A King and His Movie

=== Librettist ===
- 1992: First Mention of the Tres Países (Argentina, Chile, Uruguay) Dramatic Competition for Compañero del alma
