= Murder in the Senate =

- Screenshot
- Spanish: Asesinato en el Senado de la Nación
- Directed by: Juan José Jusid
- Written by: Carlos Somigliana
- Produced by: Alberto Trigo; Horacio Casares
- Starring: José Soriano; Miguel Ángel Solá; Oscar Martínez; Arturo Bonín; Ana María Picchio
- Cinematography: José María Hermo
- Edited by: Luis César D'Angiolillo
- Music by: Baby López Fürst
- Distributed by: Horacio Casares Prod. S.A.
- Release date: 13 September 1984 (Argentina)
- Running time: 105 minutes
- Country: Argentina
- Language: Spanish

Murder in the Senate (Spanish: Asesinato en el Senado de la Nación) is a 1984 Argentine historical crime drama film directed by Juan José Jusid and written by Carlos Somigliana. It stars José Soriano, Miguel Ángel Solá and Oscar Martínez. The film premiered on 13 September 1984 in Buenos Aires. Miguel Ángel Solá won Best Actor for his performance at the Havana Film Festival and Jusid won a Golden Colon to best director at the Huelva Latin American Film Festival.

The political film is set in 1930s Argentina, during the so-called Infamous Decade. It tells the story of the real-life assassination attempt on politician Lisandro de la Torre by Ramón Valdez Cora.

== Synopsis ==
In 1934, Argentine Senator Lisandro de la Torre launched a parliamentary investigation into systematic tax evasion and corruption within the meat trade with Great Britain, a subject that his fellow party member Julio Noble had previously attempted but failed to uncover. During this investigation, tragedy struck when de la Torre's disciple and close friend, senator-elect Enzo Bordabehere, was shot and murdered amid a parliamentary debate, leading to the federal intervention in the province of Santa Fe, Argentina. The film depicts the unfolding of de la Torre's and Bordabehere's quest to expose the truth, as well as the manipulation of former cop and henchman Valdez Cora, who would later become de la Torre's would-be assassin, by corrupt members of the Senate, particularly the pro-Nazi figure Don Alberto.

== Cast ==
- José Soriano as Lisandro de la Torre
- Miguel Ángel Solá as Ramón Valdés Cora
- Oscar Martínez as Federico Pinedo
- Alberto Segado as Luis Duhau
- Arturo Bonín as Enzo Bordabehere
- Villanueva Cosse as Don Alberto
- Juan Leyrado as Comisario
- Manuel Callau as Soriano
- Marta Bianchi as Rosa
- Selva Alemán as Elvira
- Ana María Picchio as Juanita
- Mónica Galán as Proxeneta
