= Jacobo Langsner =

Uruguayan playwright (1927–2020)

Jacobo Langsner (23 June 1927 – 10 August 2020) was a Uruguayan playwright who had a strong presence in the Uruguayan theatre from 1950 onwards. His work is a showcase of middle-class hypocrisy.

Langsner was born in Romuli, Kingdom of Romania in a Jewish family, and died, aged 93, in Buenos Aires, Argentina.

One of his most highly regarded works is Waiting for the Hearse. It was adapted into film in Argentina, another country where he was very successful.

== Works ==
- 1938: Los elegidos, simultaneously in Buenos Aires and Montevideo.
- 1951: El hombre incompleto, Sala Verdi (Montevideo).
- 1953: El juego de Ifigenia, Solís Theatre (Montevideo).
- 1953: Los artistas, Sala Verdi (Montevideo), directed by José Estruch, Club de Teatro.
- 1962: Esperando la carroza, Comedia Nacional (Montevideo).
- 1971: Ocho espías al champagne, Sala Verdi (Montevideo).
- 1973: El tobogán, Teatro Odeón (Montevideo), directed by Omar Grasso, with China Zorrilla
- 1973: Una corona para Benito, by the China Zorrilla Company. Teatro Odeón (Montevideo).
- El terremoto, by the Virginia Lago Company (Buenos Aires).
- La gotita, by the Brandoni-Bianchi Company (Buenos Aires).
- 1981: La planta, Comedia Nacional (Montevideo).
- 1984: Una margarita llamada Mercedes, by the China Zorrilla company.
- 1992: De mis amores con Douglas Fairbanks, Teatro El Galpón (Montevideo)
- Locos de contento, by the company Oscar Martínez-Mercedes Morán.
- Otros paraísos, with Norman Briski and Cristina Banegas, Teatro Municipal General San Martín (Buenos Aires) and Comedia Nacional (Montevideo).
- 2004: Damas y caballeros.
