= Adrian Brown (director) =

British theatre, television director, and poet (1929–2019)

Adrian Brown (30 April 1929 – 27 April 2019) was a British theatre, television director and poet. He was nominated for a BAFTA with Peter Griffiths for his direction of The Caucasian Chalk Circle in 1985 and won an International Emmy for Thames TV in 1987 for an adaptation of William Luce's The Belle of Amherst starring Claire Bloom. He directed the world premiere of Less Than Kind by Terence Rattigan at the Jermyn Street Theatre, which was staged in early 2011. He published two volumes of verse and held the title of Grand Master of the Knights of Verse of the Eccentric Club.

== Personal life ==
While an undergraduate at Exeter College, Oxford, Brown first met Terence Rattigan. They met again in Paris three years later and were to become lovers throughout the 1950s.
