= Black Octopus =

1985 television series

Black Octopus / El pulpo negro
- Directed by: Marta Reguera
- Written by: Luis Murillo
- Starring: Narciso Ibáñez Menta; Osvaldo Brandi; Héctor Biuchet
- Music by: Arcana by Edgar Varèse
- Production company: Telearte Argentina
- Distributed by: Canal 9
- Release date: 1985
- Running time: 624 minutes
- Country: Argentina
- Language: Spanish

Black Octopus (Spanish: El pulpo negro) is a 1985 Argentine television mini-series (624 min), directed by Marta Reguera, and written by Luis Murillo, with Narciso Ibáñez Menta in the main role.

== Plot ==
A mysterious writer of detective fiction blackmails four 'respectable' men with a criminal past to force them to murder a stranger at random. A small black octopus toy is left beside the corpse of the victims.

== Cast ==
- Narciso Ibáñez Menta as Arturo Leblanc / Héctor de Rodas / Claudio Leonardi
- Osvaldo Brandi as Méndez
- Héctor Biuchet as Guevara
- Ariel Keller as Velázquez
- Juan Carlos Puppo as Duarte
- Beatriz Día Quiroga as Martha
- Tony Vilas as Armando
- Oscar Ferrigno as Police Inspector Alejandro Mendoza
- Juan Carlos Galván as Detective Marcos de la Hoz
- Erika Wallner as Eva Rinaldi
- Cristina Lemercier as Mara Salerno
- Wagner Mautone as Alfredo Heredia
- Zelmar Gueñol as mortuary manager
- Villanueva Cosse as Martín Gálvez
- Max Berliner as collaborator of a radio programme
- Alfredo Iglesias as Enrique Ferrante
