= Waiting for the Hearse (play) =

Theatrical play written by Jacobo Langsner

Waiting for the Hearse (Spanish: Esperando la carroza) is a theatrical play, written by the Uruguayan Jacobo Langsner. It belongs to the criollo grotesque (costumbrismo) genre or black comedy and premiered in Montevideo in 1962. Ever since it has seen many adaptations, including the world-famous 1985 film of the same name.

== Plot ==
Mamá Cora, an octogenarian widow with four children, lives with one of them in dire financial troubles, with lack of space and constant generational conflicts. Her daughter-in-law asks desperately for the siblings-in-law to take their mother with any of them for a while. During a classic Sunday meal, Mamá Cora's destiny is heftily debated; no one wants to take responsibility for the old lady, with the women speaking out their opinions and the men trying to maintain respect for the name of their mother. Meanwhile, Mamá cora disappears; at the same time, the family takes notice of a disfigured body of an old lady who committed suicide throwing herself under a train, with the remorseful clan coming to the hastened conclusion that Mamá Cora has killed herself so she could stop causing trouble. In the meantime, from a neighbour's terrace, Mamá Cora watches people coming and going in and out from her son's house. Years of troubles, resentment and intrigues come up between all of them while they prepare the funeral service for Mamá Cora. Misunderstandings follow, and family's awful truths surface. In the middle of her own vigil, Mamá Cora reappears, leaving everybody astonished. From now on, nothing will be the same again.
