= I Don't Want to Talk About It (film) =

1993 film

- Theatrical release poster
- Directed by: María Luisa Bemberg
- Written by: María Luisa Bemberg; Jorge Goldenberg; Julio Llinás; Aldo Romero
- Produced by: Oscar Kramer
- Starring: Marcello Mastroianni
- Cinematography: Félix Monti
- Edited by: Juan Carlos Macías
- Release date: 20 May 1993
- Running time: 106 minutes
- Countries: Argentina; Italy
- Language: Spanish
- Box office: 197,000 admissions (Argentina)

I Don't Want to Talk About It (Spanish: De eso no se habla, Italian: Di questo non si parla) is a 1993 Argentine-Italian drama film directed by María Luisa Bemberg, starring Luisina Brando and Marcello Mastroianni. This film was shot in the historic quarter of Colonia del Sacramento, Uruguay. The script was based on a short story by Julio Llinas.

== Cast ==
- Marcello Mastroianni - Ludovico D'Andrea
- Luisina Brando - Leonor
- Alejandra Podesta - Charlotte
- Betiana Blum - Madama
- Roberto Carnaghi - Father Aurelio
- Alberto Segado - Dr. Blanes
- Mónica Lacoste - Sra. Blanes
- Jorge Luz - Lord Mayor
- Mónica Villa - Mrs. Zamudio
- Juan Manuel Tenuta - Police Chief
- Tina Serrano - Widow Schmidt
- Verónica Llinás - Myrna
- Susana Cortínez - Sra Peralta
- Martin Kalwill - Mayor's Clerk
- Walter Marín - Mojame

== See also ==
- List of films featuring the deaf and hard of hearing
