= Waiting for the Hearse =

- Spanish language theatrical release poster
- Directed by: Alejandro Doria
- Screenplay by: Alejandro Doria; Jacobo Langsner
- Based on: Esperando la carroza by Jacobo Langsner
- Produced by: Diana Frey; Alejandro Doria
- Starring: Luis Brandoni; China Zorrilla; Antonio Gasalla; Mónica Villa; Betiana Blum; Juan Manuel Tenuta
- Cinematography: Juan Carlos Lenardi
- Edited by: Silvia Ripoll
- Music by: Feliciano Brunelli
- Production companies: Rosafrey; Susy Suranyi y Asociados
- Distributed by: Primer Plano Film Group (2012, Argentina - digitally restored version)
- Release date: 6 May 1985
- Running time: 85 minutes
- Country: Argentina
- Language: Spanish

Waiting for the Hearse (Esperando la carroza in Spanish) is a 1985 Argentine black comedy film directed by Alejandro Doria. It opened on 6 May 1985. Originally not successful upon release, it is now considered a cult film and representative of Argentine culture.

The movie belongs to the criollo grotesque (costumbrismo) genre and is based on the Uruguayan play of the same name by Jacobo Langsner, premiered by the Comedia Nacional company in 1962. The film adaptation starred local well-known figures from the theatre world, such as Antonio Gasalla, China Zorrilla, Luis Brandoni and Betiana Blum. It's considered a classic in the River Plate culture, and its reruns on TV still draw large audiences. On April 2, 2009, 23 years after the original film's release, a sequel, Waiting for the Hearse 2, was released.

In a survey of the 100 greatest films of Argentine cinema carried out by the Museo del Cine Pablo Ducrós Hicken in 2000, the film reached the 12th position. In a new version of the survey organized in 2022 by the specialized magazines La vida útil, Taipei and La tierra quema, presented at the Mar del Plata International Film Festival, the film reached the 16th position. Also in 2022, the film was included in Spanish magazine Fotogramas's list of the 20 best Argentine films of all time.

== Background ==
The film was an adaptation of the play Esperando la carroza (Waiting for the Hearse) by Romanian-Uruguayan Jacobo Langsner and its TV adaptation, broadcast as a part of a show called Alta Comedia by Channel 9 of Buenos Aires during the 1970s, starred China Zorrilla who would go on to play the main role on the big screen adaptation later on, Pepe Soriano, Raúl Rossi, Dora Baret, Alberto Argibay, Lita Soriano, Alicia Berdaxágar, Marta Gam and the special appearance of the Austrian actress and acting teacher Hedy Crilla (1898–1984) as Mamá Cora.

Author and director Alejandro Doria rewrote the script for it to include more lines for the Mamá Cora character, which had very few in both previous versions, among other modifications.

== Plot ==
The Musicardi family's octogenarian widow, Ana María de los Dolores Buscaroli, called Mamá Cora by everybody (Antonio Gasalla), has four children: Antonio (Luis Brandoni), Sergio (Juan Manuel Tenuta), Emilia (Lidia Catalano) and Jorge Musicardi (Julio De Grazia), whom she lives with and who is going through financial troubles. This situation, plus lack of space and constant generational conflicts, makes Susana, Jorge's wife (Mónica Villa), beg her siblings-in-law to take their mother with any of them for a while after Mamá Cora misunderstood her and ruined part of the meal Susana had labored over.

Susana storms into Sergio's house, who's getting ready with his perfidious wife Elvira (China Zorrilla) and their daughter Matilde (Andrea Tenuta) to welcome, with a classic Sunday meal, nouveau riche Antonio and his wife Nora (Betiana Blum), who ascended socially and economically in unclear circumstances during Argentina's last dictatorship. Despite Susana's pleading, no one wants to house Mamá Cora.

After what happened with Susana, Mamá Cora decides to go out and stop bothering everyone for some hours. She ends up in the house across Sergio's babysitting the son of Dominga, the neighbor. When nobody can find her after the fight with Susana and they hear news about the discovery of an old lady's disfigured body after committing suicide by throwing herself under a train, the remorseful clan comes to the hastened conclusion that Mamá Cora killed herself so she would stop being a bother. Heartbroken, they arrange a funeral and invite a large number of Mamá Cora's relatives, friends and acquaintances. The conmotion attracts Mamá Cora's attention from up on Dominga's terrace.

Years of troubles, resentment and intrigues come up between all of the Musicardis while they prepare the service for their matriarch. In the middle of her own vigil, Mamá Cora reappears, leaving everybody astonished. She is convinced to go to a funeral for the old lady who had committed suicide, a Hungarian woman whose body was sent to the Musicardi family by mistake, so she won't discover she stumbled upon her own funeral. The rest of the family stays behind and reflects on the events of the afternoon.

== Cast ==
- Luis Brandoni as Antonio Musicardi
- China Zorrilla as Elvira Romero-Musicardi (Sergio's wife)
- Antonio Gasalla as Ana María de los Dolores Buscarolli-Musicardi (Mamá Cora)
- Betiana Blum as Nora (Antonio's wife)
- Julio de Grazia as Jorge Musicardi
- Mónica Villa as Susana (Jorge's wife)
- Juan Manuel Tenuta as Sergio Musicardi
- Andrea Tenuta as Matilde Musicardi (Sergio and Elvira's daughter)
- Darío Grandinetti as Cacho (Emilia's son)
- Cecilia Rossetto as Dominga
- Enrique Pinti as Felipe
- Lidia Catalano as Emilia Musicardi
- Clotilde Borella as Doña Elisa
- Juan Acosta as Peralta

== Production ==
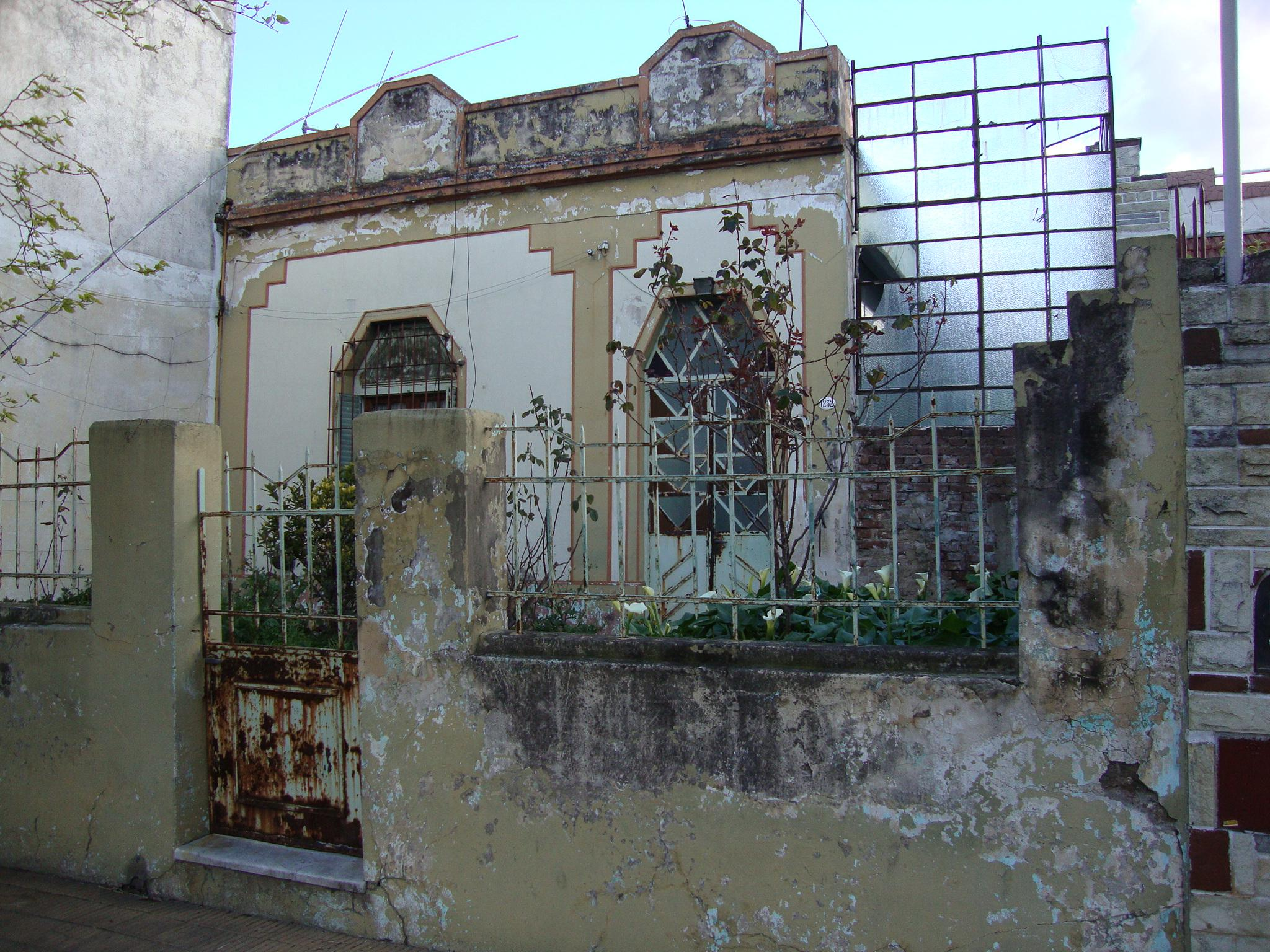
Sergio's house on Echenagucía street in 2010, visibly damaged.

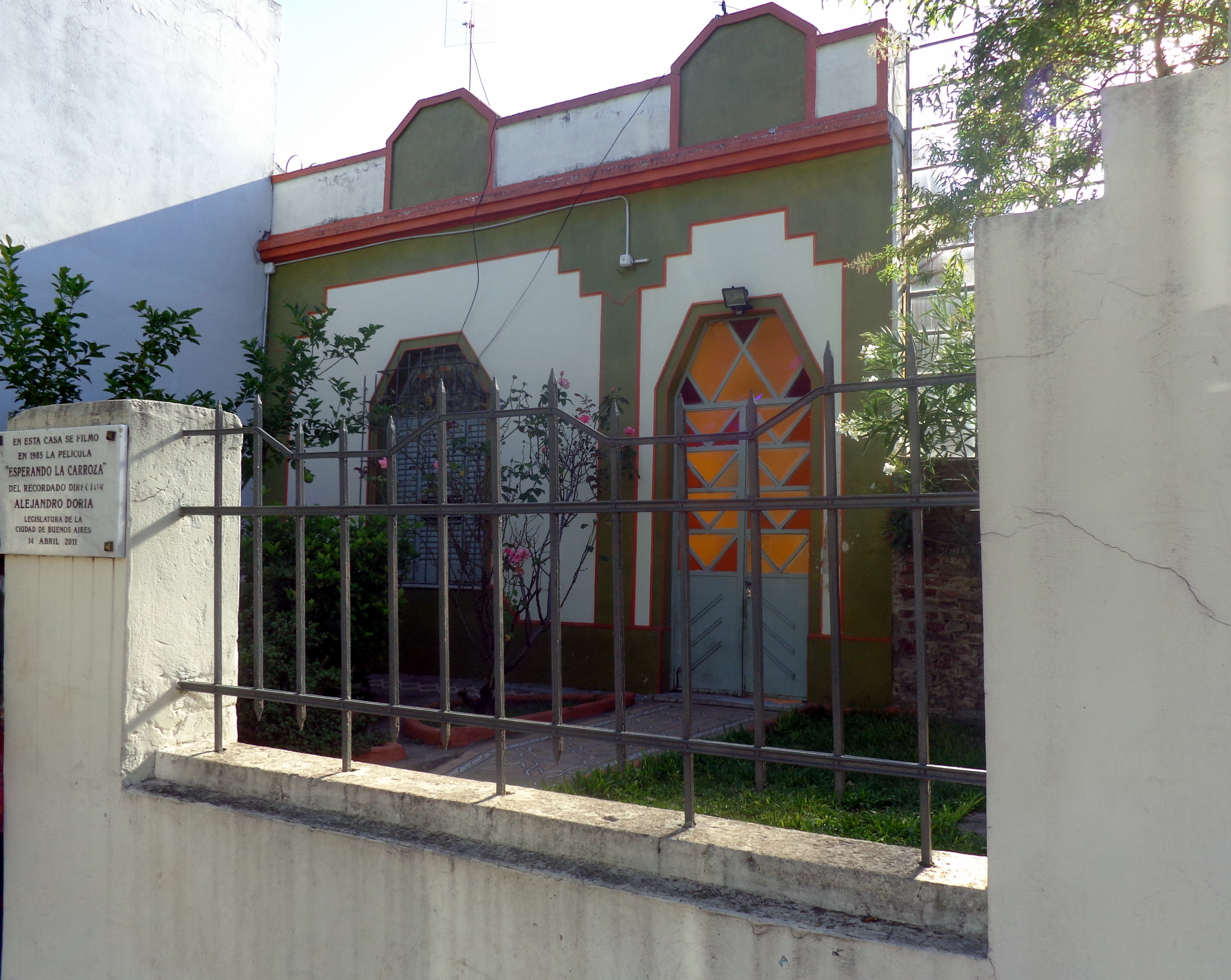
The same house in 2014, with a plaque commemorating it.

The house where the action takes place is in the neighborhood Versalles in Buenos Aires, on Echenagucía St. It was restored and declared Cultural Heritage of the city of Buenos Aires.

== Reception ==
Waiting for the Hearse was initially not well received by critics upon its release, and it was a moderate success at the box office. It later became a cult classic in Argentine cinema, and - since the first decades after its release - it has been considered as bitter satire of Argentine idiosyncrasy, the reality of the late '70s and early 80's and the disregard for senior people, as well as the state of the post-dictatorship society.

The script won the Argentores Award (the award of the Argentine Authors' Union) and the Argentine Film Critics Association award for Best Adapted Screenplay.

== Legacy ==
As a cult classic, every year the film draws high audience numbers when it is broadcast on TV, generally on Sundays, since the story takes place on a Sunday. The dialogues have spawned catchphrases and expressions that have since been incorporated to the everyday language of both Argentina and Uruguay.

Celebrating two decades from its opening, in 2005 the film's DVD was launched with behind-the-scenes and deleted footage, plus an interview with Doria.

The character of "Mamá Cora" was later played by Antonio Gasalla in many other TV shows, including his own.

=== Sequel ===
The sequel, Waiting for the Hearse 2, was filmed in 2008 with a script that was written by Jacobo Langsner in 1986. The film was later released in 2009. It received very negative reviews and did poorly at the box office. The role of Jorge was taken by Roberto Carnaghi, due to Julio de Grazia's death in 1989.

== Remakes and adaptations ==
Among the different international adaptations, there is a Portuguese TV movie titled Querida mãe ("Beloved mom"), based on the movie.

An homonymous play was premiered in Madrid, with Spanish actors speaking with a rioplatense accent.

A Brazilian remake by Fox Filmes do Brasil and Globo Filmes was released in 2008, starring Ary Fontoura and titled A guerra dos Rocha (The war of the Rochas).
