= China Zorrilla =

Uruguayan actress (1922–2014)

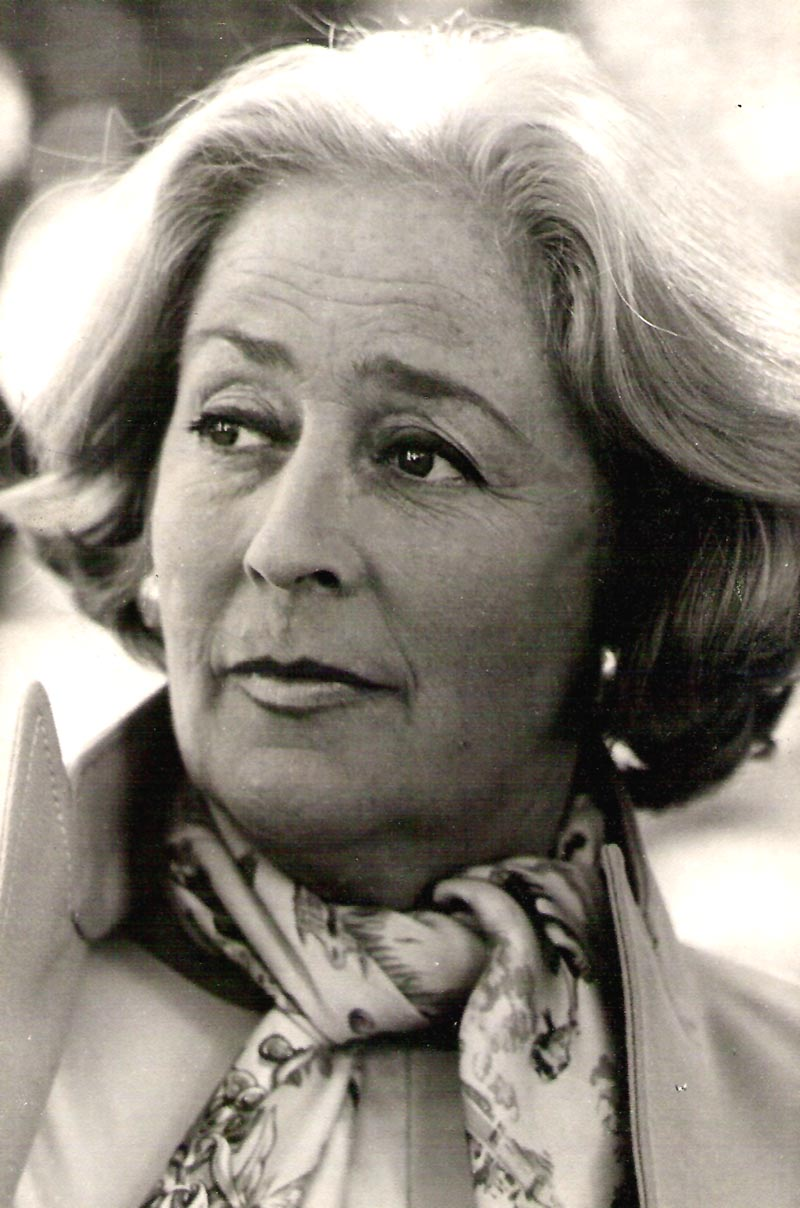
- "China" Zorrilla in 1974
- Born: Concepción Zorrilla de San Martín y Muñoz del Campo; 14 March 1922; Montevideo, Uruguay
- Died: 17 September 2014 (aged 92); Montevideo, Uruguay
- Occupations: Actress, director, producer
- Years active: 1947–2010
- Parents: José Luis Zorrilla de San Martín (father); Guma Muñoz del Campo (mother)

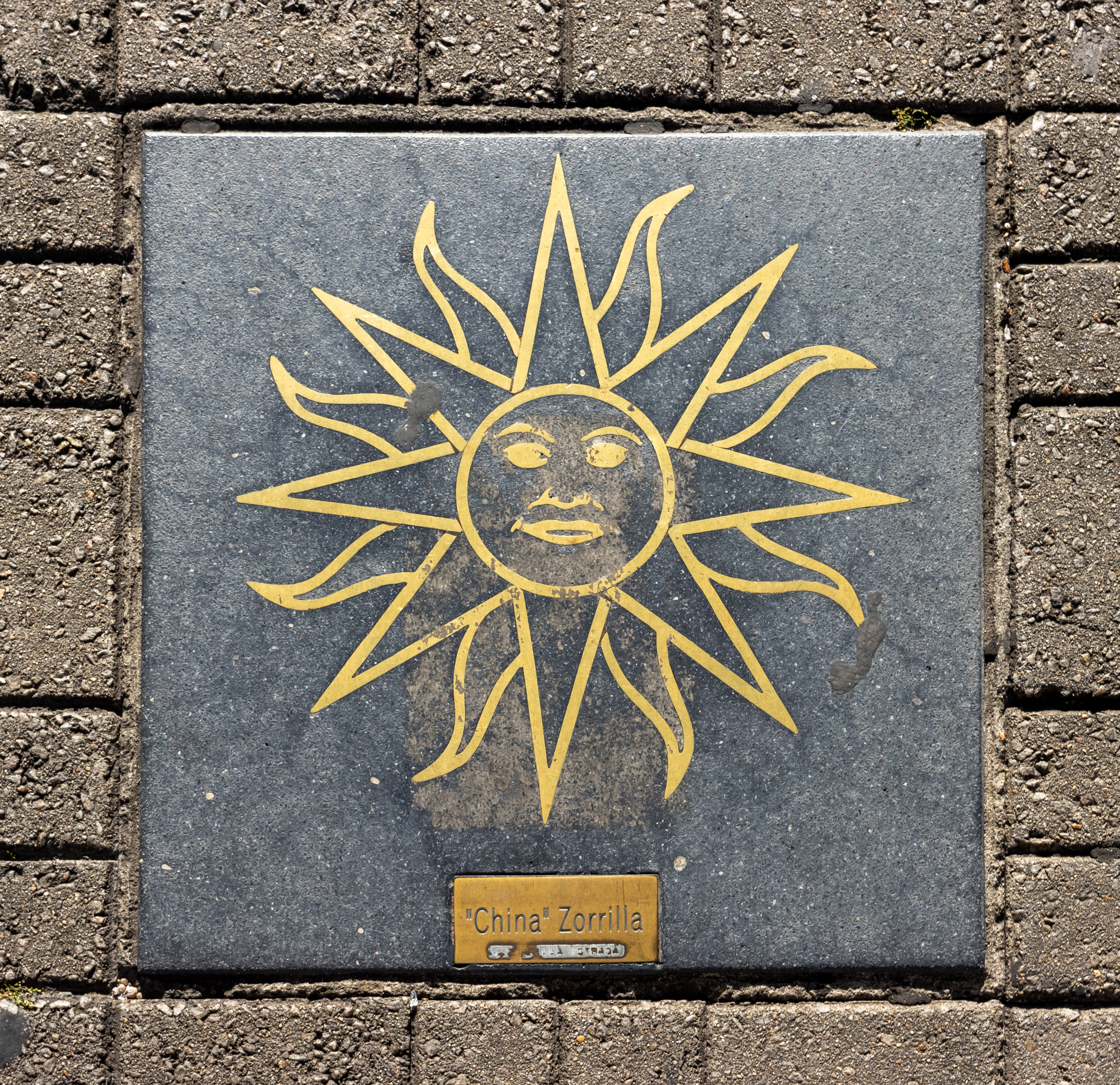
Plaque at the Suns of the Paseo de los Soles, Montevideo, Uruguay

China Zorrilla (Spanish: [ˈtʃina soˈriʝa]; born Concepción Matilde Zorrilla de San Martín y Muñoz del Campo; 14 March 1922 – 17 September 2014) was a Uruguayan theater, film, and television actress, also director, producer and writer. An immensely popular star in the Rioplatense area, she is often regarded as a "Grande Dame" of the South American theater stage.

After a long career in the Uruguayan theater, Zorrilla made over fifty appearances in Argentina's film, theater and TV. Her career took off in Uruguay in the 1950 and 1960s, later she settled in Argentina, where she lived for over 35 years and was popular on TV, theater, and cinema. At 90, she retired and returned to Uruguay, where she died in 2014.

In 2008, Zorrilla was invested Chevalier des Arts et des Lettres by the French Government and in 2011, the Uruguayan Postal Service released a print run of 500 commemorative postage stamps dedicated to her.

== Early life ==
Born in Montevideo into an aristocratic Uruguayan family, "China" was the second of the five daughters of Guma Muñoz del Campo and sculptor José Luis Zorrilla de San Martín (1891–1975), a disciple of Antoine Bourdelle, responsible for monuments in Uruguay and Argentina. Revered as Uruguay's national poet, her paternal grandfather was Juan Zorrilla de San Martín, author of Tabaré. An artistic family, her older sister, Guma Zorrilla (1919–2001), was a theater costume designer for the Uruguayan stage.

She grew up in Paris with her four sisters. Back in Montevideo, she attended Sagrado Corazón (Sacred Heart) School. In 1946, she earned a British Council scholarship to the Royal Academy of Dramatic Art in London, where she studied under Greek actress Katina Paxinou.

She herself explained the origin of her stage name "China": in Montevideo, it was common to give women whose first name was Concepción the diminutive nickname “Cochona”. Later, when she moved to France, that nickname was easily distorted into “cochon” (french for pig), so she playfully stated she rather be called “Cochina” (spanish for a female pig); with time she shortened it, calling herself China.

== Uruguay ==
Back in her hometown, Zorrilla made her theater debut in Paul Claudel's The Tidings Brought to Mary in 1948. Immediately after, she joined the ensemble of the National Comedy of Uruguay working for 10 years at the Solís Theatre, where Spanish actress Margarita Xirgu directed her in García Lorca's Blood Wedding, Fernando de Rojas' La Celestina, Shakespeare's A Midsummer Night's Dream, Romeo and Juliet, and other classics

During the 1950s and 1960s, Zorrilla appeared in Bertolt Brecht' Mother Courage and Her Children, "Filomena Marturano", Romeo and Juliet, Macbeth, A Midsummer Night's Dream, Tartuffe. The Seagull, Wilder's Our Town, Neil Simon's Plaza Suite, Giraudoux's The Madwoman of Chaillot, and plays by Pirandello, Peter Ustinov, Tirso de Molina, Lope de Vega, Henrik Ibsen, August Strindberg, J.B. Priestley, and Ferenc Molnár. She received critical acclaim for her performances in Thornton Wilder's The Matchmaker and in Hay Fever as Judith Bliss.

After a decade at the Comedia Nacional, Zorrilla went on to found the Teatro de la Ciudad de Montevideo with actor Enrique Guarnero and actor-writer Antonio Larreta. The company toured Buenos Aires, Paris, and Madrid, where they won the Spanish Critics Award for their stagings of Federico García Lorca's La zapatera prodigiosa and Lope de Vega in the summer of 1961.

Between 1964 and 1966, Zorrilla took a sabbatical year and lived in New York, where she worked as a French teacher and Broadway secretary. In New York, she staged Canciones para mirar, a children's musical based on texts by Argentine poet Maria Elena Walsh. During her stay in the U.S., Zorrilla was rumoured to have an affair with comedian Danny Kaye, who often mentioned her in interviews.

As a correspondent for the Uruguayan newspaper El País, she covered events such as the Cannes Film Festival for Homero Alsina Thevenet and other international events (later published in a book Diarios de viaje) and also hosted a talk show for many years.

In opera, she directed Puccini's La bohème, Verdi's Un ballo in maschera at the Solís Theatre and the Montevideo's SODRE and Rossini's Il barbiere di Siviglia at the Teatro Argentino de La Plata in 1977.

2011 – The voice of the narrations of OTRA VIDA by the English composer Clive Nolan and the writer Elizeth Schluk

== Argentina ==
=== Stage ===
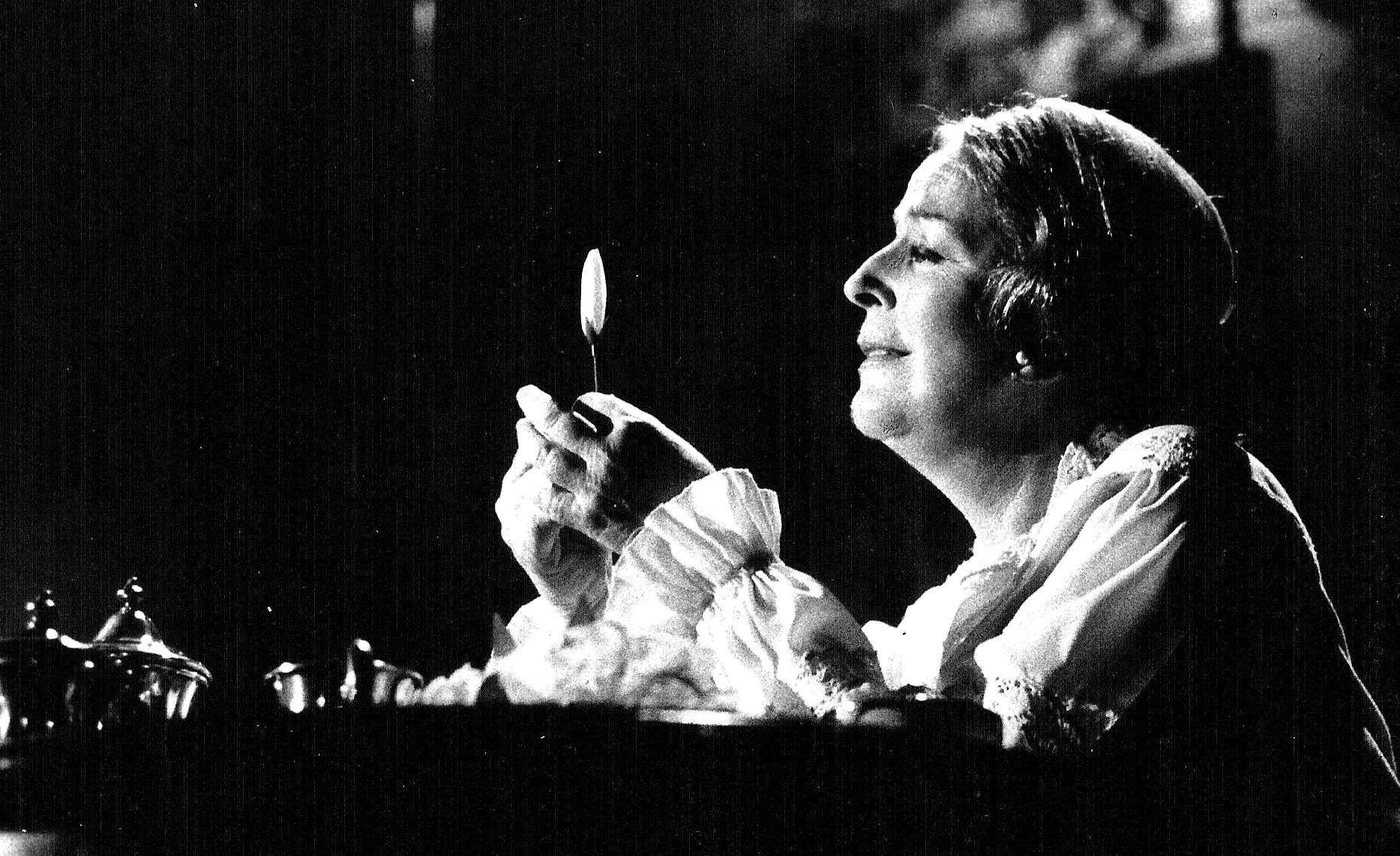
China Zorrilla as Emily Dickinson in The Belle of Amherst, 1980

Summoned by actor and director Lautaro Murúa to appear as Donna Natividad in the third movie version of Un Guapo del 900, China Zorrilla's film debut came late in 1971 at age 49. The following summer she made replaced actress Ana María Campoy in Butterflies are Free, which was performed in Mar del Plata. She settled in Buenos Aires. Her stay coincided with the civilian-military dictatorship in Uruguay (1973–1985), which spied on her and forced her to stay abroad. The Argentine dictatorship also viewed her as "dangerous". Zorrilla expressed her solidarity by protecting and helping Uruguayans flee the dictatorship. During that period, she was banned by the Uruguay military regime from performing in Uruguayan theatres. After the country's return to democracy in the 1980s, Zorrilla made a triumphal comeback at the Teatro Solís as Emily Dickinson.

During the mid-1970s and 1980s, Zorrilla toured and performed nationally and internationally, including the Kennedy Center for the Performing Arts.

On stage she has portrayed historical figures such as Emily Dickinson in William Luce's The Belle of Amherst, Monica Ottino's Victoria Ocampo, Mrs. Patrick Campbell in Jerome Kilty's Dear Liar: A Comedy of Letters. Zorrilla performed in plays by Jean Cocteau, Lucille Fletcher, Oscar Viale, and fellow countryman Jacobo Langsner who wrote several plays for her. She reprised one of her theater earlier successes, the part of Judith Bliss in Hay Fever.

In 1995, she appeared in Buenos Aires's main opera house, the Teatro Colón as Persephone in Stravinsky and Gide's Perséphone.

Zorrilla adapted, directed, and produced plays and musicals: Goldoni's Servant of Two Masters, Reginald Rose's Twelve Angry Men, Georges Feydeau's A Flea in Her Ear and Neil Simon's Lost in Yonkers.

In the last decade, she won four awards as sculptor Helen Martins in Athol Fugard's The Road to Mecca and as Eve in an adaption of Mark Twain's Eve's Diary.

=== Film and TV ===
After her debut in 1971 as Mother Natividad in Murua's Un guapo del 900, Zorrilla appeared in more than 40 Argentinian movies. In 1973, she became a popular star in Alberto Migré's soap operas. In 1984, she won Best Actress at the La Habana Film Festival for "Darse Cuenta". She performed in Summer of the Colt (a Canadian coproduction), Maria Luisa Bemberg's Nobody's Wife, The Jewish Gauchos, the coproduction The Plague (starring William Hurt and Raúl Juliá), Edgardo Cozarinsky's Guerriers et captives, Manuel Puig's "Pubis Angelical", Adolfo Aristarain's Lasts Days of the Victim, and in the Argentine black comedy Esperando la carroza (Waiting for the Hearse).

Later, Zorrilla earned international recognition for her performances in Conversaciones con mamá in 2005 (2004 Best Actress Award at the 26th Moscow International Film Festival and the Málaga Film Festival) and in Elsa & Fred, which won her several awards, including the Silver Condor for Best Actress.

== Death ==
Zorrilla died on 17 September 2014 from pneumonia in a hospital in Montevideo, Uruguay, aged 92. The government of Argentina and Uruguay declared two days of national mourning defining her as "a true representative of River Plate culture". She was waked at Montevideo's Congress. Before reaching the cemetery, the procession made a brief stopover at the Teatro Solís.

== Honors ==
- Orden de Mayo by the Argentine government
- Orden Gabriela Mistral by the Chilean government
- Illustrious Citizen of Buenos Aires, Montevideo, and other Argentine cities, and two theaters bear her name
- Knight (Chevalier) of the Légion d'honneur by the French Government
- Honorary Medal, Domingo Faustino Sarmiento del Senado de la Nación Argentina 2010
- Commemorative Postage Stamp, Uruguayan Post
- China Zorrilla, the largest electric ferry, scheduled to connect Uruguay and Argentina

== Books ==
- Diego Fischer, A mi me aplauden, 2012, Uruguay, ISBN 9789974 701 22 9
- China Zorrilla, Diario de viaje, Ediciones La Plaza, 2013, Uruguay, ISBN 9789974482265
- Julio Maria Sanguinetti (2015). "Retratos desde la memoria" Montevideo: Debolsillo. ISBN 9789974899179
- Miguel Ángel Campodónico, Nuevo Diccionario de la Cultura Uruguaya, Librería Linardi y Risso, 2003, S.361

== Music ==
- Otra Vida – Composed by Clive Nolan written by Elizeth Schluk, year 2011 Altagama Producciones.

== Filmography ==
=== Film ===
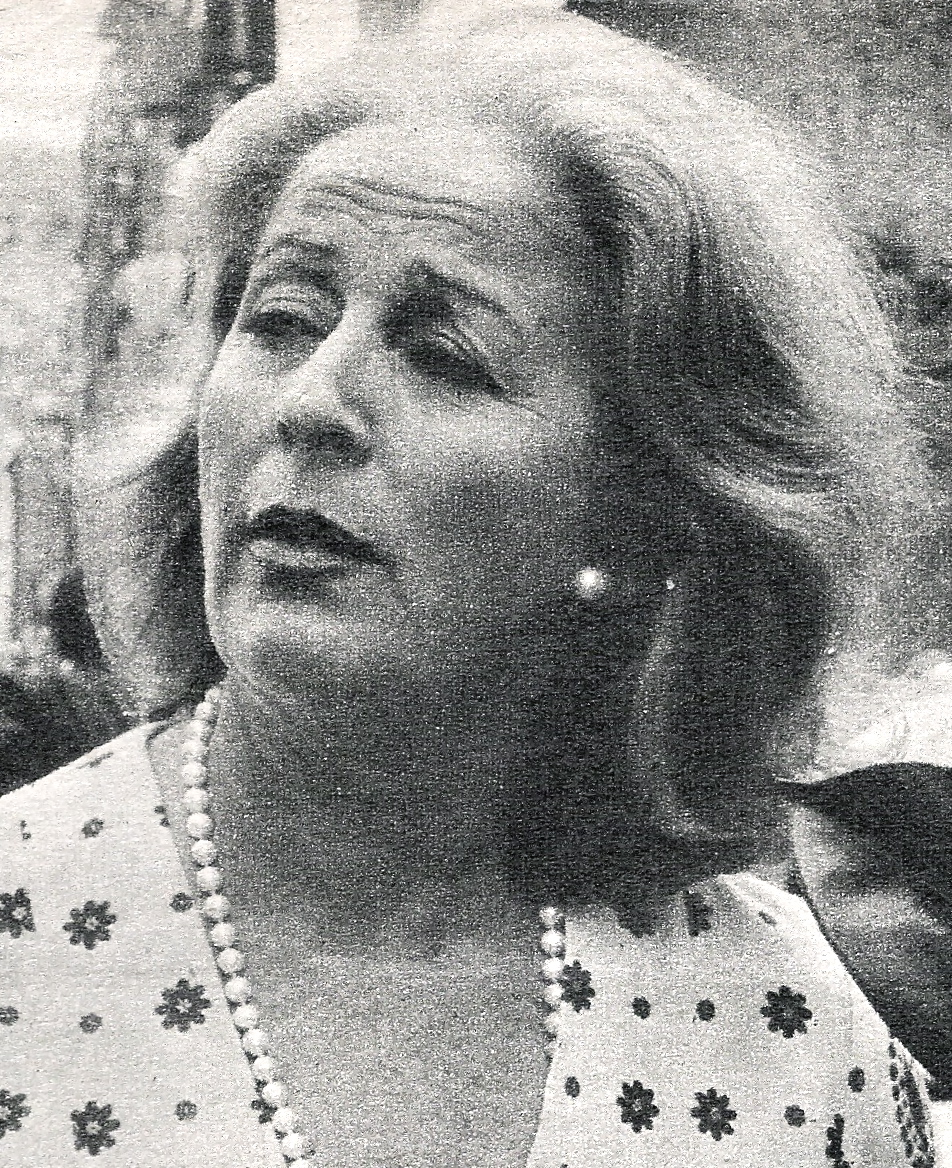
China Zorrilla, 1975

Year	Title	Role
2008	Sangre del Pacifico	
2007	Tocar el cielo	Imperio
2005	Elsa y Fred	Elsa
2004	Conversaciones con mamá	Mamá
2003	Margarita Xirgu, la desterrada	Herself
1997	Sin querer	
1997	Entre la sombra y el alma (short film)	
1996	Besos en la frente	Mercedes Arévalo
1996	Lola Mora	
1995	Fotos del alma	Esthercita
1995	La nave de los locos	Dr Marta Caminos
1994	Guerriers et captives	
1992	Cuatro caras para Victoria	Victoria Ocampo IV
1992	La Peste	Emma Rieux
1991	Dios los cría	
1991	El verano del potro	Ana
1989	Nunca estuve en Viena	Carlota
1986	Pobre mariposa	
1985	Waiting for the Hearse	Elvira Romero de Musicardi
1985	Contar hasta diez	
1984	Darse cuenta	Nurse Agueda
1982	La invitación	
1982	Pubis angelical	
1982	Últimos días de la víctima	Beba
1982	Señora de nadie	Madre de Leonor
1975	Los gauchos judíos	Sarah
1975	Triángulo de cuatro	
1975	Las sorpresas	
1974	The Truce	
1973	Las venganzas de Beto Sánchez	Teacher
1972	La Maffia	Asunta Donato
1971	Un Guapo del 900	Dona Natividad

=== Television ===
Year	Title	Role
2005	Mujeres asesinas	Inés Quinteros (1 episode)
2004	Los Roldán	Mercedes Lozada
2004	Piel naranja años después	Doña Elena
2003	Son amores	Margarita (uncredited)
2002	099 Central	Dora (uncredited)
2001	Enamorarte	Mercedes "Mechita" Dugan viuda de Juarez
2001	Las amantes	
1998	Gasoleros	Matilde
1997	El arcángel	
1997	Ricos y famosos	Catalina
1997	Rodolfo Rojas D.T.	Tina
	Noches Chinas	Hostess / as herself
1996	La salud de los enfermos (TV film)	Mother
1995	Leandro Leiva, un soñador	
1990	Atreverse	
1980	El solitario (miniseries)	Melani Duvalie
1979	Chau, amor mío	Ana
1976	Los que estamos solos	Doña Barbarita
1975	Piel naranja	Elena
1974	Mi hombre sin noche	Casilda
1973	Pobre diabla	Aída Morelli
1972	Esperando la carroza	Elvira
1971	El tobogán	Rosa

== Bibliography ==
- Fischer, Diego (2012). A mí me aplauden. Las historias que China no contó. Montevideo: Editorial Sudamericana.
