= Beatriz Día Quiroga =

Argentine radio and television actress

- Born: 19 October 1936; Buenos Aires
- Died: 15 October 2016 (aged 79); Buenos Aires
- Resting place: Chacarita Cemetery
- Occupation: Actress
- Spouse: Jorge Bellizzi (1927–2002)

Beatriz Día Quiroga (19 October 1936 – 15 October 2016) was an Argentine radio and television actress.

== Career ==
Quiroga began her career as a radio actress working in radio soap operas. She started with Narciso Ibáñez Menta in a 1960 production of The Phantom of the Opera, and Quiroga made such an impression on Ibáñez that she was a member of other works of Ibáñez, such as La pata del mono in 1961 and El muñeco maldito the following year, thus firmly establishing herself in the Argentinian television scene. She received the Martín Fierro Award in 1960 for her work. In 1961, Quiroga and Jorge Salcedo played in the telenovela Un porvenir en la baldosa roja and in 1964 performed alongside Fernando Siro in La novela Odol de la tarde. Other incursions into television include Malevo (telenovela) (1972), Alguna vez, algún día (1976) and in 1985 when she collaborated with Ibañez again for Black Octopus. In radio, she participated in several broadcasts of Las dos carátulas. The only Quiroga's work in a film was in 1948, when she played a minor role in Tierra del Fuego, by Mario Soffici.

On 15 October 2016, Beatriz Día Quiroga died in Buenos Aires.
