= Baby Etchecopar =

Argentinian actor and TV/radio host

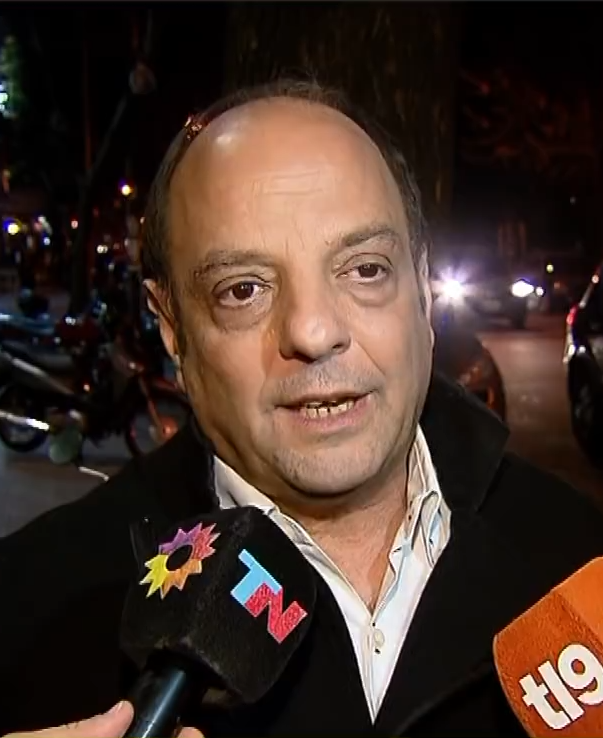
Baby Etchecopar.

Ángel Pedro Etchecopar better known as Baby Etchecopar (born 16 February 1953 in San Fernando, province of Buenos Aires) is an Argentinian actor and television-radio host. Currently host the late-night talk show Basta Baby in A24.

He was a key figure of Radio 10 with his show El ángel del mediodía. Sometimes focused in Politics, he is considered controversial in the Argentinian media accused of racism and misogyny. He was sentenced for discriminatory comments and for exposing personal telephone numbers of Women Rights' activists by an Argentinian judge in 2018. He was ordered to assist to Civil Rights lessons and to give some minutes of his show to discuss about feminism causes.

Also he had a career as actor. He was the leading figure in the TV show Contrafuego and did some theater presentations.
