= Romuli =

- Commune
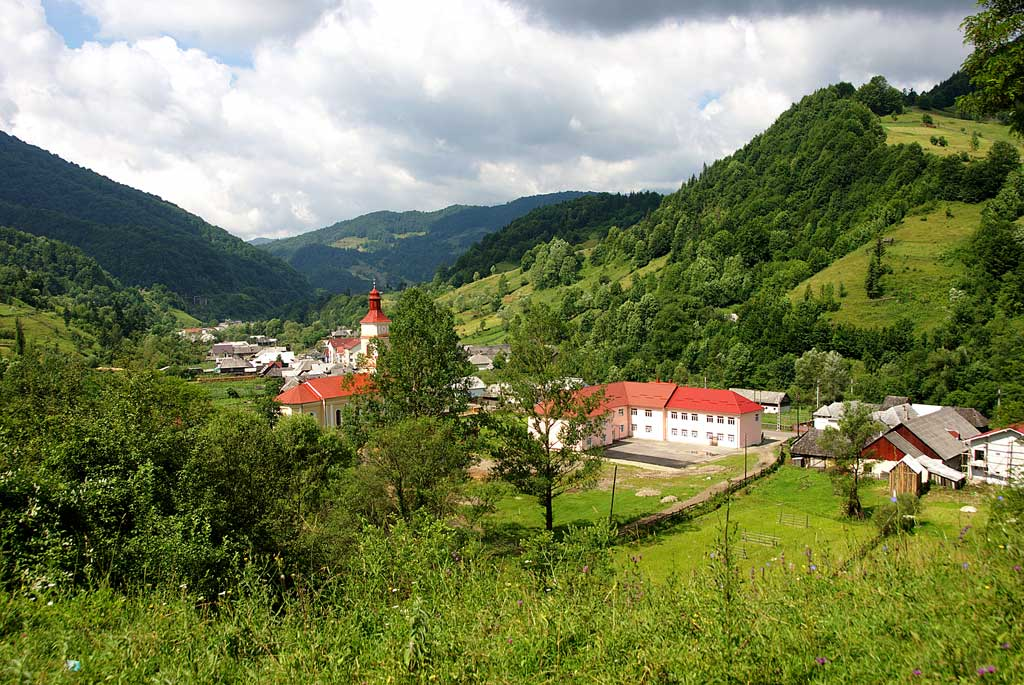
- View of Romuli towards the south

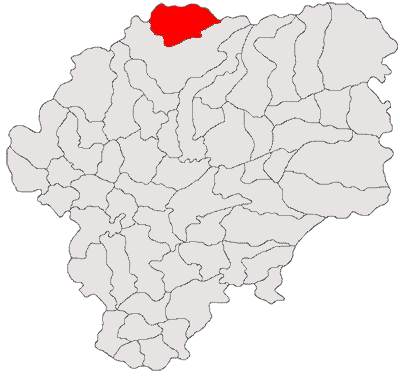
- Location in Bistrița-Năsăud County

- Location in Romania
- Coordinates: 47°32′N 24°26′E
- Country: Romania
- County: Bistrița-Năsăud

Government
  - Mayor (2020–2024): Ioan Monița (PSD)
- Area: 102.29 km^{2} (39.49 sq mi)
- Elevation: 565 m (1,854 ft)
- Population (2021-12-01): 1,714
  - Density: 16.76/km^{2} (43.40/sq mi)
- Time zone: UTC+02:00 (EET)
  - Summer (DST): UTC+03:00 (EEST)
- Postal code: 427250
- Area code: (+40) 02 63
- Vehicle reg.: BN
- Website: primariaromuli.ro

Romuli (Hungarian: Romoly) is a commune in Bistrița-Năsăud County, Transylvania, Romania. It is composed of two villages, Dealu Ștefăniței (Szalanca) and Romuli.

== Geography ==
The commune is located at the northern extremity of Bistrița-Năsăud County, 60 km (37 mi) from the county seat, Bistrița, on the border with Maramureș County. It is situated at an altitude of 565 m (1,854 ft), along the Dealul Ștefăniței Pass, in a hilly area between the Țibleș Mountains and the Rodna Mountains.

Romuli is crossed south to north by the national road DN17C, which starts in Bistrița and ends in Vișeu de Sus, 33 km (21 mi) to the north. The commune has two train stations (one in Romuli and one in Dealu Ștefăniței), that serve the 118 km (73 mi) long CFR Line 409, which runs from Salva to Vișeu de Jos and on to Sighetu Marmației, on the border with Ukraine.

== History ==
Romuli was also known as Strâmba.

== Demography ==
Historical population
Year	Pop.	±%
2002	1,755	—
2011	1,672	−4.7%
2021	1,714	+2.5%
Source: Census data

== Notable people ==
- Jacobo Langsner (1927–2020), Uruguayan playwright
