= The Loves of Kafka =

1988 film

Los Amores de Kafka
- Directed by: Beda Docampo Feijóo
- Written by: Juan Bautista Stagnaro
- Starring: Cecilia Roth
- Release date: 4 August 1988
- Running time: 98 minute
- Country: Argentina
- Language: Spanish

Los Amores de Kafka ("The Loves of Kafta") is a 1988 Argentine romantic biographical film directed by Beda Docampo Feijóo and written by Juan Bautista Stagnaro. Starring Cecilia Roth.

== Summary ==
An Argentine film director travels to Prague to make a film about Franz Kafka and Milena Jesenská.

== Cast ==
- Susú Pecoraro .... Milena Jejenska
- Jorge Marrale .... Franz Kafka
- Villanueva Cosse .... Kafka's Father
- Salo Pasik .... Max Brod
- Sofía Viruboff .... Julie
- Cecilia Roth .... Kafka's Sister
- Aldo Barbero
- Roberto Carnaghi
- Andrea Tenuta
- Gabriela Flores
- Natalio Hoxman
- Aldo Pastur
- Héctor Pellegrini
- Lorenzo Quinteros

== Release ==
The film premiered in Argentina on 4 August 1988.
