= Juan Manuel Tenuta =

Juan Manuel Tenuta (Fray Bentos, Uruguay, 23 January 1924 – Buenos Aires, Argentina, 5 November 2013) was a Uruguayan actor, active in Argentina.

He is most remembered for his roles in Waiting for the Hearse, I Don't Want to Talk About It and Night of the Pencils.

Married to actress Adela Gleijer, he was father of the actress Andrea Tenuta.
