= Alberto Segado =

Argentine actor

Albert Segado (1944 – December 14, 2010) was an Argentine actor whose stage and film credits included Asesinato en el Senado de la Nación and I Don't Want to Talk About It.

Segado studied acting at the Instituto de Teatro of the University of Buenos Aires. He spent much of his career at the Teatro General San Martín in Buenos Aires.

Alberto Segado died at the Sanatorio de la Providencia, where he had been hospitalized for two days, on December 14, 2010, at the age of 66.
