= Diego Fischer =

Uruguayan journalist and writer

- Born: Diego Fischer Requena; 1 January 1961 (age 65); Montevideo, Uruguay
- Education: Universidad de Navarra
- Occupations: communicator, writern, journalist
- Awards: Premio Libro de Oro
- Website: https://www.diegofischer.com.uy

Diego Fischer Requena (born 1961) is a Uruguayan journalist and writer.

== Selected works ==
- 1997, Al este de la historia, ISBN 9974-653-98-3 (tres tomos)
- 2004, Que nos abrace el viento, ISBN 9974-95-023-6
- 2008, Al encuentro de las tres Marías, ISBN 978-9974-95-428-1
- 2010, Qué tupé, ISBN 978-9974-683-40-2
- 2011, Hasta donde me lleve la vida, ISBN 978-9974-683-63-1
- 2012, A mí me aplauden, ISBN 9789974 701 22 9
- 2013, Serás mía o de nadie, ISBN 978-9974-713-39-0
- 2014, Tres hombres y una batalla, ISBN 978-9974-723-18-4
- 2015, Carlota Ferreira. ISBN 9789974732711
- 2016, Mejor Callar.ISBN 9789974741690
- 2017, El sentir de las violetas.ISBN 9789974881716
- 2018, Doña Cándida Saravia.ISBN 9789974903432
- 2019, El robo de la historia.
- 2020, Cuando todo pase. ISBN 9789915654744
- 2021, Qué poco vale la vida.ISBN 9789915663555
- 2022, Sufrir en el silencio ISBN 9789915673189
- 2023, Secretos de un jardín
- 2023, El precio de una traición (ISBN 9789915683089)
- 2024, La gran farsa (ISBN 978-9915-692-57-9)
