= Contrafuego =

- Genre: Action
- Written by: Marta Saint Jean; Lito Gras; Tom Cundom
- Directed by: Tom Cundom; Lito Gras
- Starring: Baby Etchecopar; Enzo Viena
- Country of origin: Argentina
- Original language: Spanish
- No. of seasons: 1
- No. of episodes: 6

Production
- Production locations: Buenos Aires, Argentina

Original release
- Network: Canal 9
- Release: 26 August – 30 September 2002

Contrafuego is an Argentinian action television series that aired on Canal 9 from 26 August to 30 September 2002 at 22.00hrs. (UTC-3). The series starred Baby Etchecopar and Enzo Viena.

== Plot ==
Tito Bisleri (Baby Etchecopar) is a policeman whose wife and daughter were killed in an attack. In the first chapter Bisleri is seen in the cemetery, leaving flowers on the graves of his family. The policeman tries to combat corruption by way of revenge for the death of his family. Tito moves in a very corrupt environment: a squad where there are some corrupt police. A politician, Miranda (Enzo Vienna) is involved in the sale of arms and drugs, and Ramirez, who investigates Miranda with such bad luck that when he has the data, three employees of the politician find him with his secretary, take pictures to blackmail him, and steal the diskettes with the key information.

Although part of a squad, Bisleri prefers to work alone. The same group that stole the floppy-discs end up crashing the truck in which they escaped into a car dealership where they take 20 hostages. Federal Police, and two mobile units, one from Radio Telenueve and another from Radio 10 arrive immediately. But they can not do anything until Tito, using his ingenuity, enters the place disguised as an empanada deliveryman and kills the criminals. With the help of a friend, Tito recovers the disks but the confrontation with the politician's henchmen will finish with the commissioner being thrown out of the force.

== Criticism ==
The first episode had an average score of 8.2 rating points, not a bad score considering the time and channel on which it was transmitted. The media echoed Etchecopar's action, making fun of it. The Diario Clarín, in its Entertainment section, described police series as "bad".

"The series lacks the slightest hint of dramatic development, not to mention the complete lack of outline and nuance in their characters. The bad guys are very bad and the good pathetic. The situations are unbelievable and the outcomes laughable. The structure is always the same, a crime is committed (hostage taking, kidnapping, weapons in a villa), Bisleri finds out and gets angry, followed by a series of disjointed, if not inexplicable scenes, until the agent throws himself against the thugs and kills them with blows from Tom Cundom's special effects (FX specialist and co-director of the series)."
