= José María Vilches =

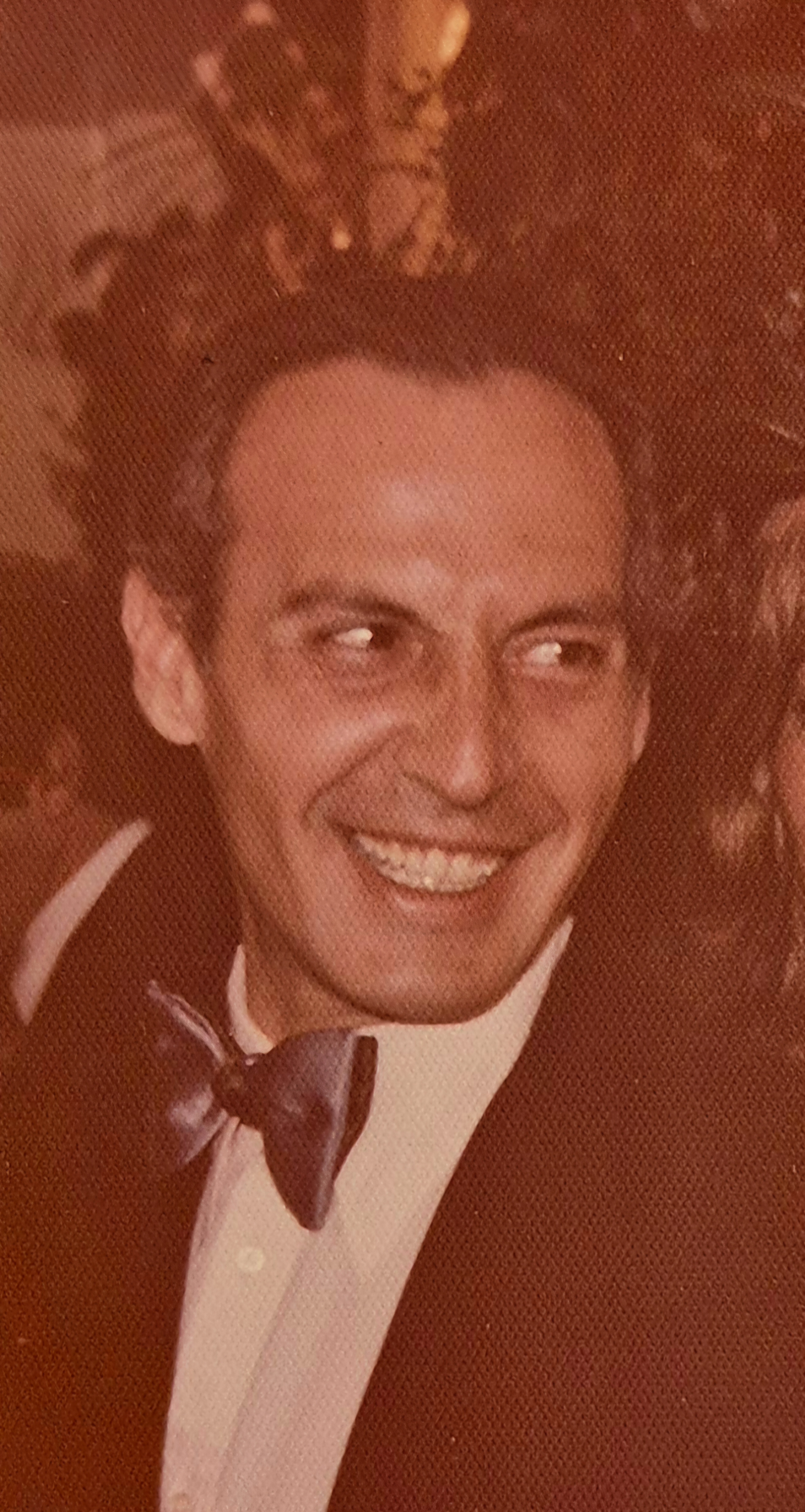
- José María Vilches at a party in Recoleta, Buenos Aires, Argentina (1977)
- Born: 1936; Alcalá de Henares, Spain
- Died: 16 October 1984 (aged 47–48); Buenos Aires, Argentina
- Occupation: Actor
- Years active: 1959-1974 (film)

José María Vilches (1936–1984) was a Spanish-born stage film and television actor. He settled in Argentina.

== Selected filmography ==
- Back to the Door (1959)

== Bibliography ==
- Florentino Soria. José María Forqué. Editora Regional de Murcia, 1990.
