= William Luce =

American writer (1931–2019)

- Born: William Aubert Luce; October 16, 1931; Portland, Oregon, U.S.
- Died: December 9, 2019 (aged 88); Green Valley, Arizona, U.S.
- Occupations: Playwright, television writer
- Partner: Ray Lewis
- Writing career
- Language: English
- Genres: Theater, television

William Aubert Luce (October 16, 1931 – December 9, 2019) was an American writer, primarily for the stage and television. He wrote several plays which starred Julie Harris, and specialized in one-person plays.

== Early life and education ==
Luce was born on October 16, 1931, in Portland, Oregon, to Chauncey Darrel Luce and Eleanor Marie (Kuul) Luce. He majored in piano at college.

== Awards and nominations ==
A member of the Dramatists Guild of America, Writers Guild of America, and Société des Auteurs et Compositeurs Dramatiques, Luce received multiple awards and nominations for his work.

=== Awards ===
- 1979 Peabody Award: Masterpiece Radio Theatre, Currer Bell, Esquire. Act 1.
- 1979 Edwin Howard Armstrong award: Currer Bell, Esquire. Act 1 (later Bronte) (WGBH production)
- 1979 Ohio State award: Currer Bell, Esquire. Act 1 (later Bronte) (WGBH production)
- 1987 International Emmy Award: The Belle of Amherst (Thames Television in London)

=== Nominations ===
- Writers Guild Award nominee: The Last Days of Patton (CBS television movie)
- Writers Guild Award nominee: The Woman He Loved (CBS television movie)

== Works ==
=== Stage ===
"Playwright William Luce picks his leading characters carefully, because they're usually the only ones in his shows." Luce wrote the one-person play, The Belle of Amherst, which premiered on Broadway in 1976, starring Julie Harris as Emily Dickinson, among others, and directed by Charles Nelson Reilly. After opening on April 28, 1976, at the Longacre Theatre, it ran for 116 performances. Subsequently, Harris toured around the country performing the play in multiple regional theatres. His play about Charlotte Brontë, Bronte, starring Julie Harris and directed by Charles Nelson Reilly, initially was filmed in 1982 in Ireland after several stage performances and televised on Public Television in 1985. Harris performed the play in regional U.S. theatre.

His play Zelda, about Zelda Fitzgerald, premiered Off-Broadway in 1984 and starred Olga Bellin. Luce turned this play into The Last Flapper, which was performed in regional U.S. theatres initially in 1987 by Piper Laurie, once again directed by Charles Nelson Reilly.

He wrote the play Lillian about Lillian Hellman, which ran on Broadway in 1986 and starred Zoe Caldwell. His play, Lucifer's Child, based on the writings of Karen Blixen (aka Isak Dinesen), appeared on Broadway in 1991 and starred Julie Harris. He wrote the play Barrymore, which premiered on Broadway in 1997 and starred Christopher Plummer as John Barrymore.

=== Opera ===
Luce wrote the libretto for the opera Gabriel's Daughter, with music by Henry Mollicone which premiered in 2003 at the Central City Opera House, Colorado.

=== Television ===
The Belle of Amherst was adapted by Luce for an IBM Television Special, starring Julie Harris and directed by Charles S. Dubin. The TV movie received an Emmy nomination for Best Actress and two Christopher Awards. The record album of the play received a Grammy Award. Thames Television (London) aired a production of the play starring Claire Bloom and directed by Adrian Brown, which received an International Emmy Award in 1987.

Luce wrote the screenplays for three television movies, telecast on CBS. The Last Days of Patton (1986) starred George C. Scott and Eva Marie Saint; The Woman He Loved (1988) starred Jane Seymour, Anthony Andrews, and Julie Harris with direction by Charles Jarrott; and Lucy & Desi: Before the Laughter (1991) starred Frances Fisher as Lucille Ball and Maurice Benard as Desi Arnaz, also directed by Charles Jarrott.

=== Film ===
Barrymore is a 2011 Canadian drama film directed and screenplay adaptation by Érik Canuel, based on William Luce's 1996 play of the same name. It stars Christopher Plummer reprising his Tony Award-winning role from the original Broadway Play as John Barrymore.

=== Literary executor ===
Luce's literary executor is author Grant Hayter-Menzies of Sidney, British Columbia, Canada.

== Personal life and death ==
Luce was with his longtime partner Ray Lewis for 50 years. Lewis was a designer of furniture and created the Fauna Collection, hand-sculpted chairs in wood with animal motifs and then cast in metal. In the early 1950s, Luce and Lewis moved from Oregon to settle in Southern California and Mariposa, California, then returned to Oregon to live on Depoe Bay from 1991 to 2001 when Lewis died at age 83. Luce remained in their home until 2015 when he moved to Arizona, where he died from Alzheimer's disease in Green Valley on December 9, 2019, at the age of 88. He is buried there in the Green Valley Cemetery (Sahuarita, Arizona).

== See also ==
- List of LGBT people from Portland, Oregon
