= Trinidad Guevara =

Uruguayan stage actress and drama teacher (1798–1873)

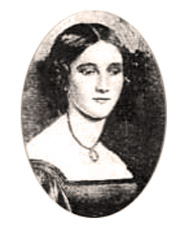
Trinidad Guevara

Trinidad Guevara (1798-1873) was a Uruguayan stage actress and drama teacher. She belonged to the star attractions of the theater stage of South America and enjoyed great fame.

She made her debut at the Casa de Comedias in Montevideo under Bartolomé Hidalgo in 1811, and was engaged at the Teatro Coliseo in Buenos Aires in 1817–1832, and toured around South America in 1832–1856. She belonged to the star attractions during her tenure in Argentina, known for her breeches roles, her ability to make her characters come to life and for her ability as an instructor of student actors. She was a controversial figure who was slandered in the conservative press for her extramarital love life, but she replied with humour and her popularity was never affected.
