= Cristina Lemercier =

Argentine actress and television presenter

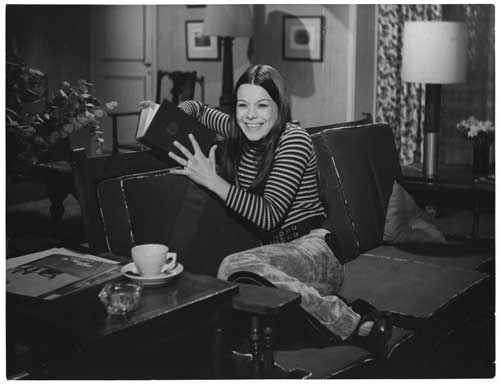
Cristina Lemercier

Cristina Lemercier (née, Noemi Cristina Perone; José C. Paz, Septiembre 1, 1951 - San Miguel, December 27, 1996) was an Argentine actress and television presenter. Her mother, a Peronist, took Lemercier to an acting audition when she was a teenager. She had two sisters, Gloria and Maria Rosa Perone. In 1968, she married the singer Freddy Tadeo (Ricardo Ortega), brother of Palito Ortega. They had three children, Pablo, Paula, and Julia. She died from a gunshot wound to the head.
