= Enzo Bordabehere =

Argentine politician (1889–1935)

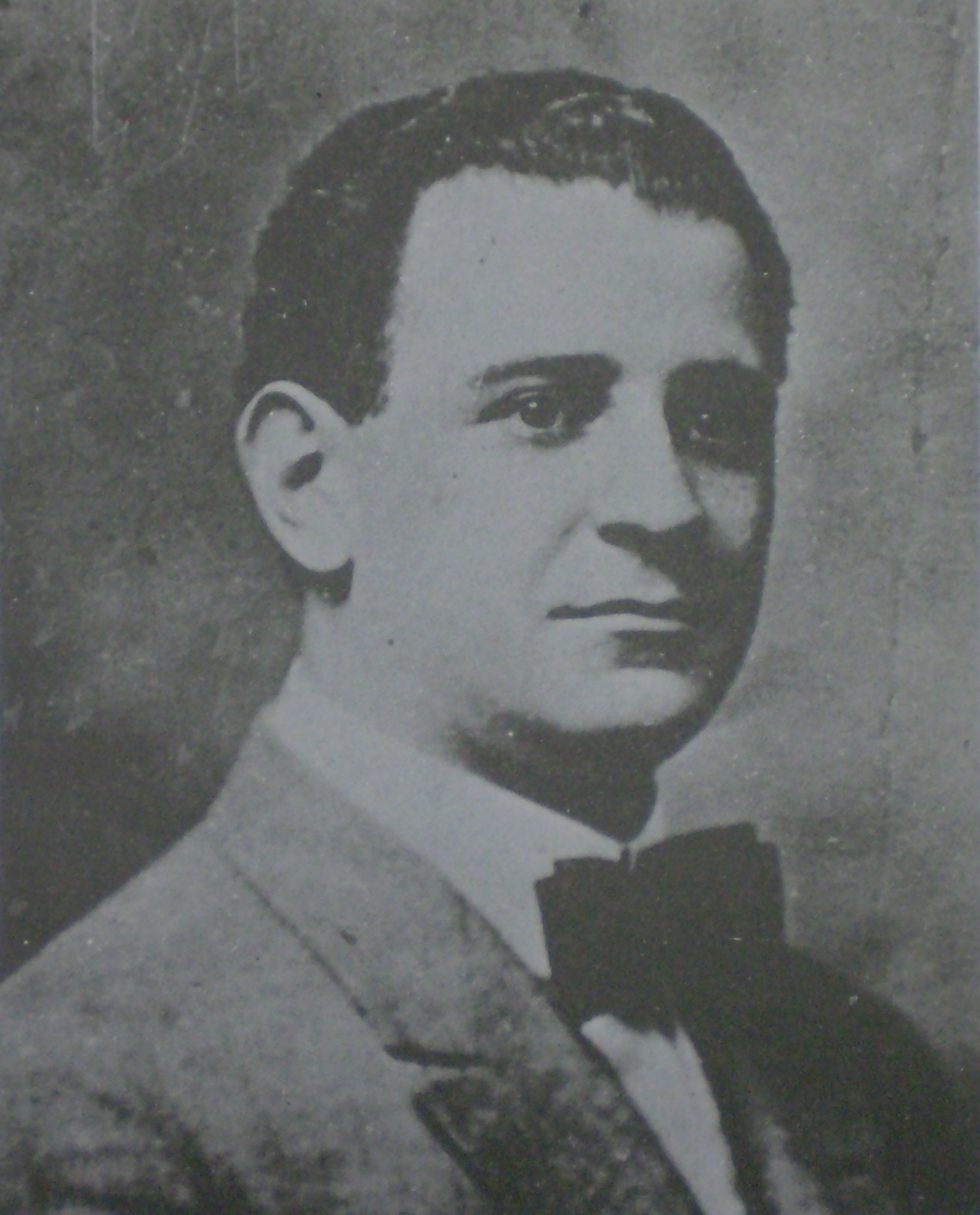
- Born: 25 September 1889; Paysandú, Uruguay
- Died: 23 July 1935 (aged 45); Buenos Aires, Argentina
- Occupation: Lawyer

Enzo Bordabehere (25 September 1889 – 23 July 1935) was an Argentine lawyer and politician. He was a National Senator for Santa Fe Province, and was assassinated in Congress during a session in the Argentine Senate.

== Biography ==
Bordabehere was born in Paysandú, Uruguay, and his family moved to Rosario in Santa Fe Province, Argentina, when he was a child. He studied law at the Provincial University of Santa Fe, and later became a notary. In 1908 he joined the reformist Southern League, and six years later was a co-founder of the Democratic Progressive Party, along with Lisandro de la Torre.

In 1918 he was elected as a representative to the provincial Congress, and in 1922 to the national Congress as a representative for the same province. In 1935, the provincial legislature named him federal Senator to replace the deceased Francisco Correa.

Bordabehere was never sworn into Congress. The paperwork for his acceptance was delayed until the conclusion of the debate surrounding the issue of meat exports to Great Britain.

== Death ==
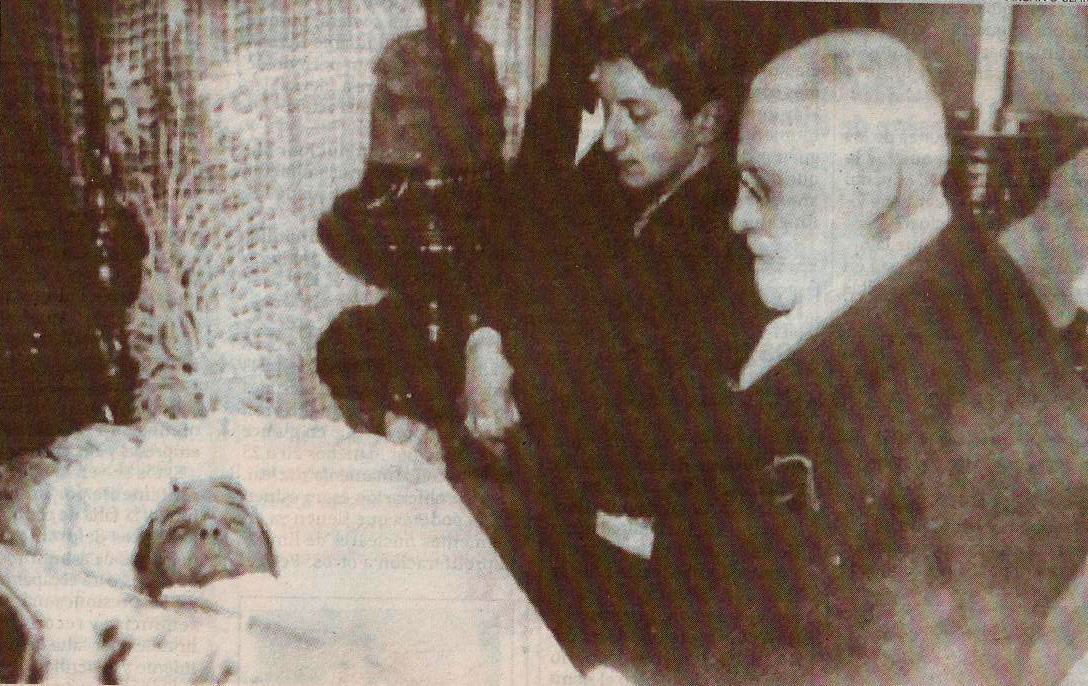
Bordabehere's funeral, with Lisandro de la Torre.

On 23 July 1935, Lisandro de la Torre, Senator for Santa Fe Province, was announcing his opposition to the signing of the Roca-Runciman Treaty of 1933. Agriculture Minister Luis Duhau and Economy Minister Federico Pinedo attended the Senate chambers for 13 consecutive days to defend the treaty.

The end of the debate came when de la Torre left his seat and walked to the minister's table and fell when he was hit by Duhau. Bordabehere, who was nearby, moved to help de la Torre. In that moment of confusion, a paid killer Ramón Valdez Cora, with a gun in his hand, shot twice at his back and when he turned, shot Bordabehere again in his chest.

Bordabehere was picked up from the floor by several legislators and moved to a nearby room and later the Ramos Mejía Hospital, while being treated by the Senate doctor. The help was to no avail, and he died at 5:10pm that day.

His body was moved to the city of Rosario where his arrival was attended by more than 12 thousand people at the Rosario Norte Station. The funeral took place at the local Police Headquarters, and he was buried at the El Salvador Cemetery, where there were numerous speeches by politicians, the press and members of Rosario's society.
