= The Belle of Amherst =

1976 play about poet Emily Dickinson

- Original language: English
- Written by: William Luce
- Characters: Emily Dickinson

Premiere
- Date: April 28, 1976
- Place: Longacre Theatre; New York City

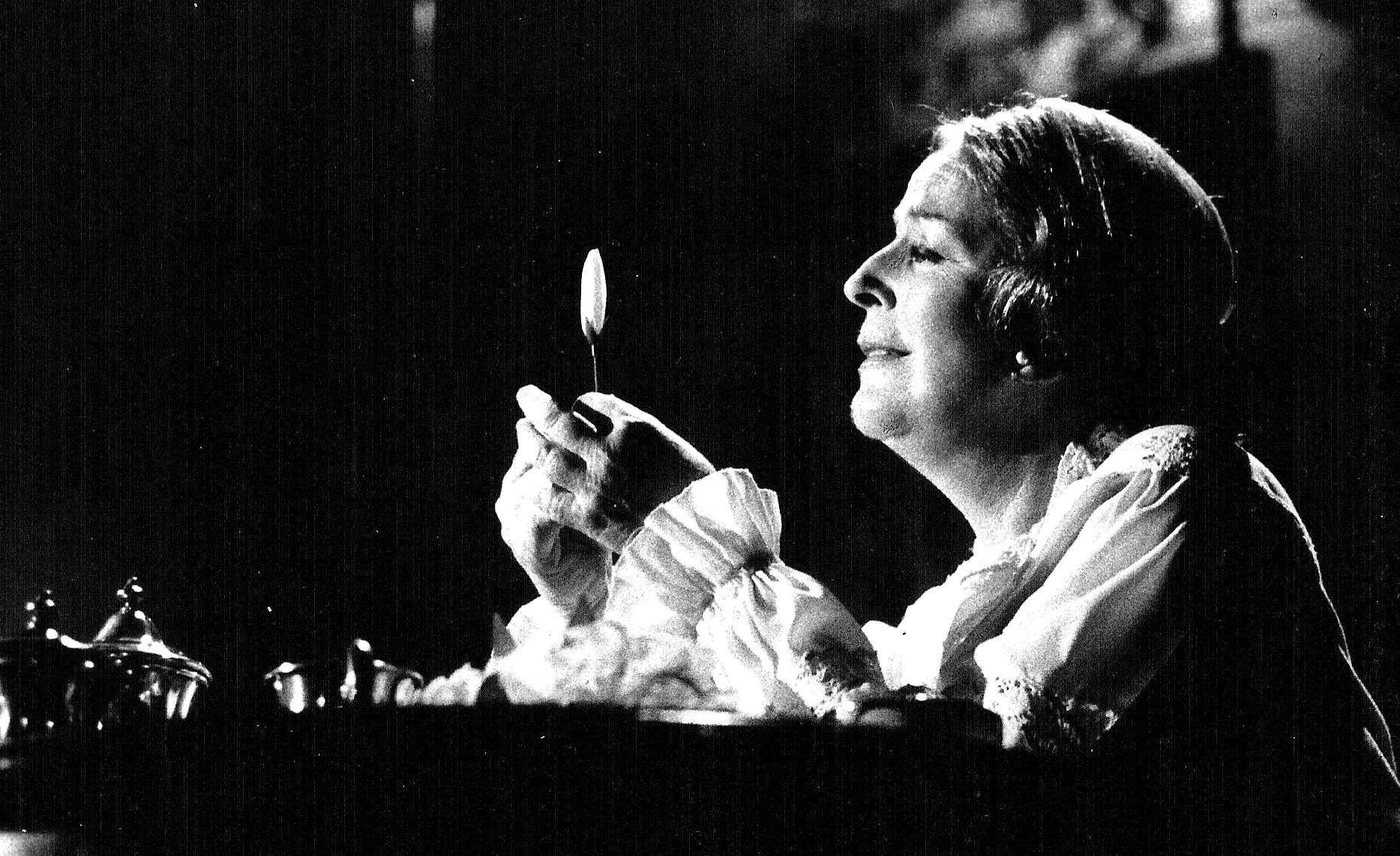
China Zorrilla as Emily Dickinson, 1981

The Belle of Amherst is a one-woman play by William Luce.

Based on the life of poet Emily Dickinson from 1830 to 1886, and set in her Amherst, Massachusetts, home, the 1976 play makes use of her work, diaries, and letters to recollect her encounters with the significant people in her life – family, close friends, and acquaintances. It balances the agony of her seclusion with the brief bright moments when she was able to experience some joy.

After one preview, the original Broadway production, directed by Charles Nelson Reilly and starring Julie Harris, opened on April 28, 1976, at the Longacre Theatre, where it ran for 116 performances. The Wall Street Journal reviewer wrote "With her technical ability and her emotional range, Miss Harris can convey profound inner turmoil at the same time that she displays irrepressible gaiety of spirit."

Harris, who portrayed 15 different characters in the play, won the Tony Award for Best Actress in a Play, earned a Drama Desk Award nomination for Unique Theatrical Experience, and won a Grammy Award for Best Spoken Word Recording. She appeared in a televised PBS production and extensively toured the country with the play for a number of years.

Dickinson biographer Lyndall Gordon criticized the play for perpetuating Mabel Loomis Todd's chaste, hermit-like image of Dickinson, as opposed to the lively, witty, provocative, and sometimes erotic Dickinson present in her work and known to those who knew her more personally.

The Spanish translation of the play was done by Argentinean poet Silvina Ocampo for the Buenos Aires premiere starring China Zorrilla in January 1981. The production ran for more than 500 performances and Zorrilla embarked on a Latin American tour that ended at New York's Hunter College in 1983 and Washington's Kennedy Center. With Emily, the Uruguayan actress made a triumphant comeback to her country after 10 years of proscription for political reasons.

In 1999, the play was presented by Cesear's Forum at Playhouse Square, Cleveland, Ohio. The production presented Dickinson in the attic of her home as a kind of apparition. Keith Joseph of Cleveland Scene found the work bizarre, mysterious and poignant. Of Cleveland actress Sheila E. Maloney, he writes: "Her poetess, instead of suggesting the usual fragility of one of the world's most famous recluses, has the mad glee of Arsenic and Old Lace's Brewster Sisters. Her approach is hearty and hale."
