= Antonio Gasalla =

Argentine actor, comedian and theatre director (1941–2025)

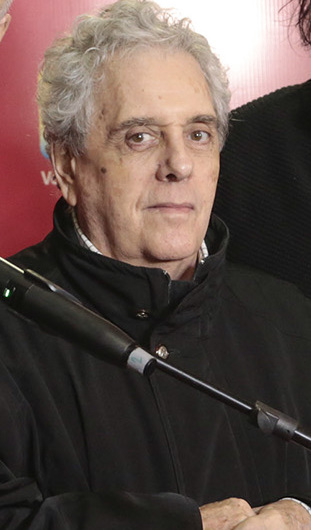
- Antonio Gasalla in 2016
- Born: 9 March 1941; Ramos Mejía, Buenos Aires Province, Argentina
- Died: 18 March 2025 (aged 84); Buenos Aires, Argentina

Antonio Gasalla (9 March 1941 – 18 March 2025) was an Argentine actor, comedian and theatre director.

== Life and work ==
Antonio Gasalla was born in Ramos Mejía, a western suburb of Buenos Aires on 9 March 1941. He enrolled at the National Dramatic Arts Conservatory, and began his work in Buenos Aires' vibrant theatre scene in 1964 as an understudy, by which he befriended a colleague, Uruguayan émigré Carlos Perciavalle. He and Perciavalle starred in their production of María Inés Quesada's Help Valentino! (1966), which they performed as a café-concert; this genre was popular in Argentina at the time, and the Gasalla-Perciavalle duo became among its best known exponents. They accepted roles in film productions of Un viaje de locos (Madmen's Journey) and Clínica con música (Musical Clinic) in 1974. Though known for their comedy roles, they were also cast in 1974 by Sergio Renán for La tregua (The Truce), the first Argentine film nominated for an Oscar for Best Foreign Language Film. The duo parted ways subsequently, and Gasalla was cast in a comic role in Tiro al aire (Shot in the Dark), a 1980 family film starring Héctor Alterio.

Offbeat film director Alejandro Doria offered Gasalla the lead role in a 1985 comedy, Esperando la carroza (Waiting for the Hearse). Portraying Mamá Cora, a mischievous nonagenarian in need of attention from her self-absorbed family, Gasalla underwent four hours of prosthetic and makeup work daily, while shooting lasted. The film is an adaptation of an earlier theater play, but Doria preferred to cast Gasalla doing a female impersonation rather than a woman as in the plays. He reasoned that this way people would laugh about the character, rather than feel pity.

He appeared seldom on television work until 1990, when he was offered a comedy show, El Mundo de Gasalla (Gasalla's World), following which he hosted or starred in numerous other variety programs on Argentine television, mostly for Channel 9. The most popular of these was El palacio de la risa (The Palace of Laughter), where television audiences became acquainted with his feminine roles. His comic portrayals earned his first Martín Fierro Award, the most prestigious in Argentine entertainment, in 1994.

Having had a falling out twenty years earlier, Gasalla and his erstwhile café-concert partner, Carlos Perciavalle, were reunited in a 1997–98 theatrical series in Punta del Este, Uruguay. Gasalla then returned to film in 2000, portraying Fredy, a homosexual man, in Almejas y mejillones (Clams and Mussels), and to the theatre, where he portrayed his numerous female characters from 2000 to 2004. He toured across the country playing those theater acts.

Ending his hiatus from television in 2004, he hosted Gasalla en pantalla (Gasalla on the Screen) and portrayed "grandma," an irreverent elderly woman, for Susana Giménez's popular variety show. Unlike the character of Mamá Cora, this character was aware of current events. Gasalla explained that he did not want to play a pathetic woman deserving of pity. This role earned him another Martín Fierro Prize. Collaborating in homages to the late comedian Niní Marshall in 2005 and for the Maipo Theatre's centennial in 2008, he also portrayed Argentine President Cristina Kirchner in Nito Artaza's Cristina en el país de las maravillas (Cristina in Wonderland). Gasalla more recently directed Hernán Casciari's Más respeto que soy tu madre (More Respect - I'm Your Mother), playing the title role, as well.

Gasalla remains among the most successful Argentine theatre and television personalities. Following a 4 May 2009 guest appearance in Marcelo Tinelli's Showmatch (as Olga, the opinionated make-up lady), the popular variety show's ratings reportedly jumped to some of the highest in local television history. His success on the stage earned him a standing as the "king of Corrientes Avenue."

== Death ==
Over the last years of his life, Gasalla stayed outside the public eye, struggling for more than five years with senile dementia. He died on 18 March 2025, nine days after his 84th birthday.
