= Arturo Bonín =

Argentine actor (1943–2022)

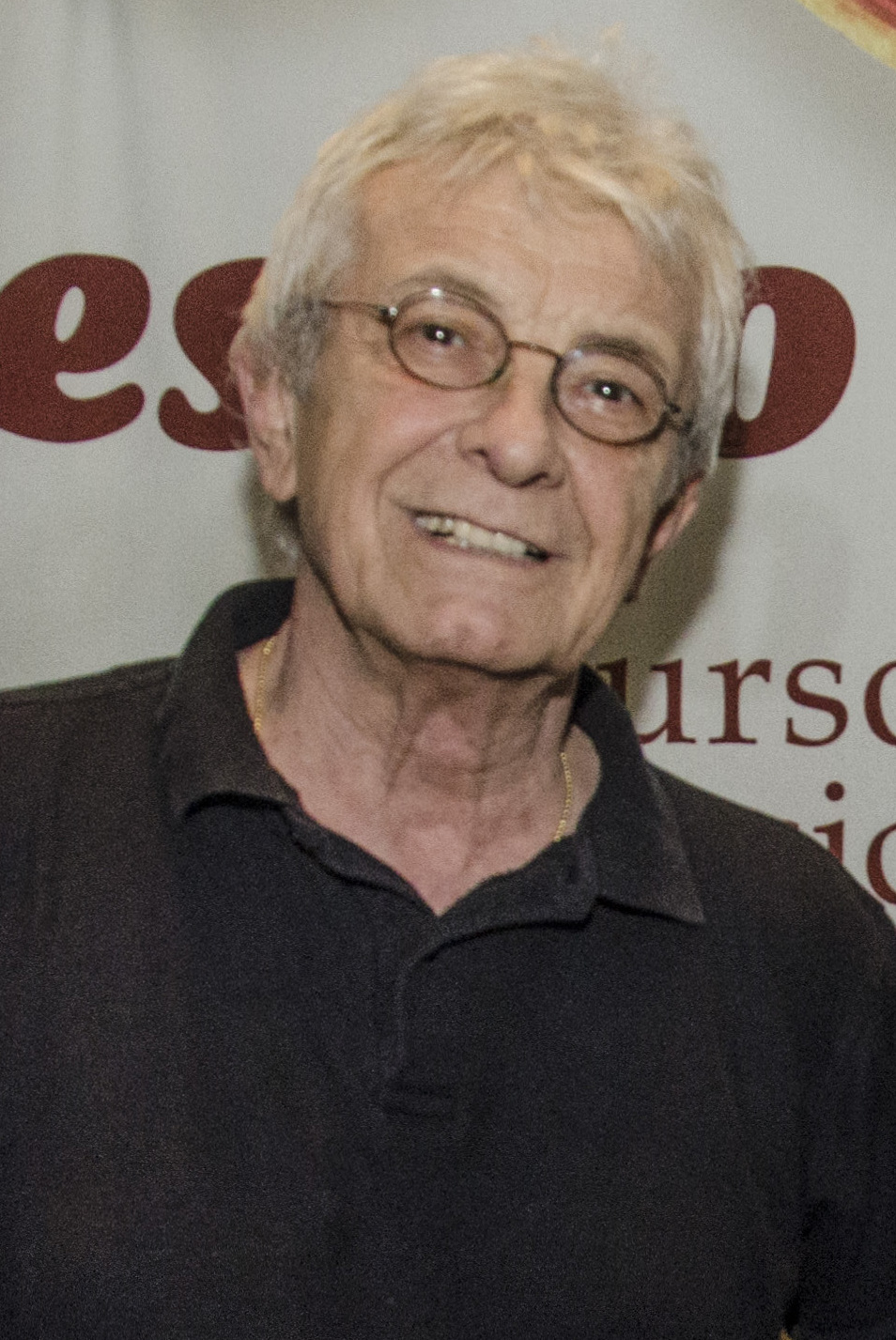
- Born: Arturo José Bonini; 11 November 1943; Buenos Aires, Argentina
- Died: 15 March 2022 (aged 78)
- Occupation: Actor

Arturo José Bonini (11 November 1943 – 15 March 2022), better known as Arturo Bonín, was an Argentine actor.

== Biography ==
Although he was born in the porteño neighborhood of Villa Urquiza, he lived his childhood and youth in Villa Ballester, north of Greater Buenos Aires. It is there where he had his first relationship with theater.

== Personal life ==
Bonín married for the first time and had a son but the relationship ended in divorce after six months. Bonín and his second wife, actress Susana Cart, met in 1971 at the Payró theater. They had one daughter together. On February 9, 1996, they legalized their marriage civilly on the initiative of their children.
