= ACE Award (Argentina) =

Argentinian film and theater award

The ACE Award is a film and theater award of Argentina. ACE stands for "Asociación de Cronistas del Espectáculo" (Spanish: Association of reporters of the showbusiness). It has been held since 1992.
