= Sea Star Awards =

Argentine award for achievements in theatre

The Sea Star Awards (Spanish: Premios Estrella de Mar) are presented annually for the best achievements in theatre and other entertainment events during the summer season in the resort city of Mar del Plata, Argentina.

== History ==
Around 1973, the entertainment activities in Mar del Plata’s summer, such as theatrical plays, the so-called café-concerts, circuses, and recitals, reached a degree of development that made it one of the most profitable investments of the summer season. The Municipal Agency of Tourism took account of the situation, and it established the awards, namely the Estrella de Mar (Sea Star), to promote the quality of the spectacles and to attract the interest of entrepreneurs. Although the mainstream stage was in the hands of national-level actors and producers, the contest is a genuine local product. The following two decades consolidated the prestige of the awards, and the producers and directors see Estrella the Mar as formidable publicity for their works and careers.

== Categories ==
The main categories are for best actor, best actress, breakthrough artist, best director, best screenplayer and best local play. The trophy consists of a bronze-covered starfish. The ceremony takes place the second Monday of February each year.
