= Comedia Nacional =

National theatre company in Uruguay

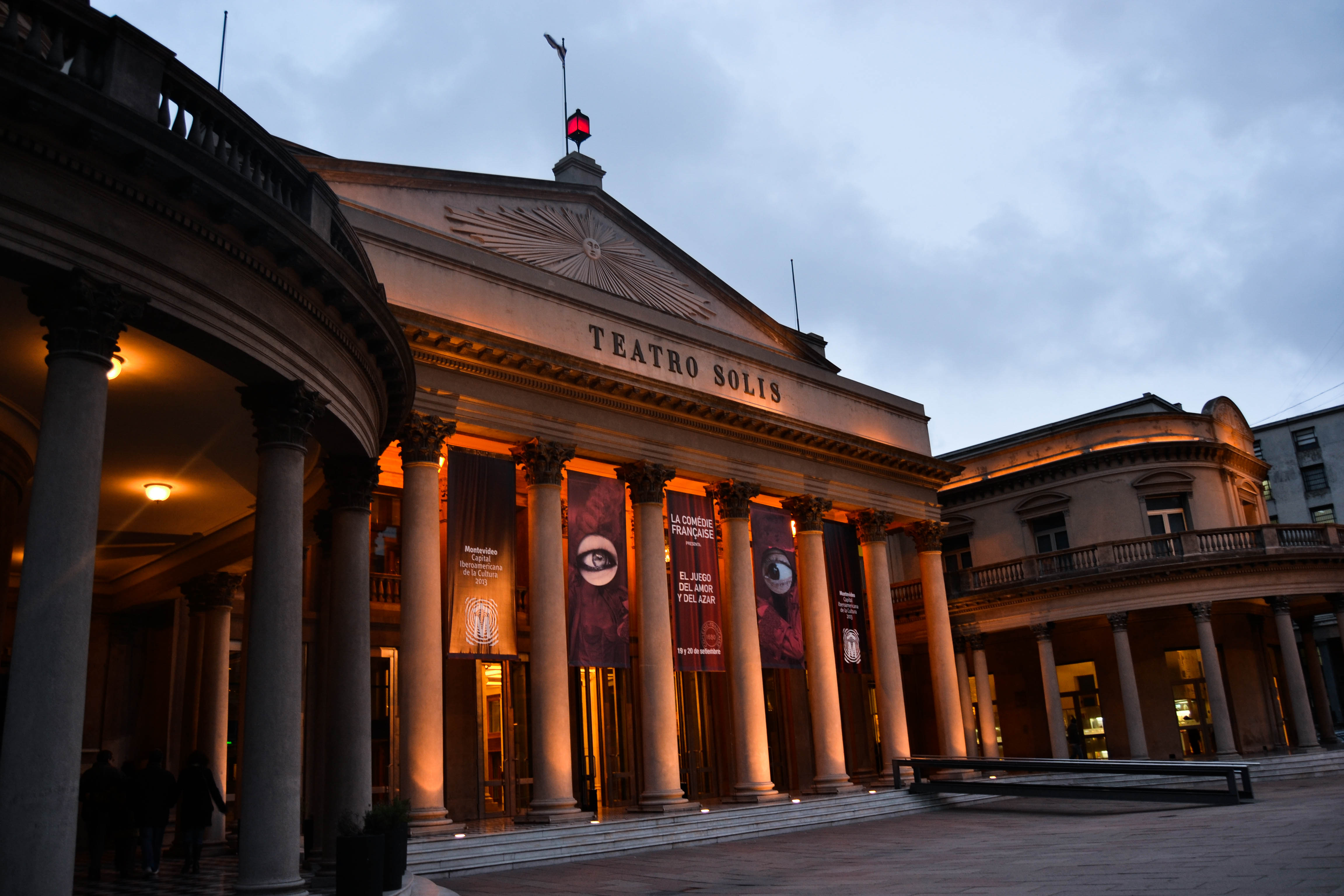
- Solís Theatre, main theater of the Comedia Nacional
- Formation: April 21, 1947; 78 years ago
- Type: Theatre group
- Location: Montevideo, Uruguay
- Artistic director: José Miguel Onaindia

The Comedia Nacional (Spanish: [koˈmeðja naθjoˈnal]) is the national theatre company of Uruguay. Founded in 1947 as a state entity with the aim of producing theatrical works with its own stable troupe of actors and the collaboration of artists and technicians, it is one of the country's leading cultural institutions.

The company has played a crucial role in the development of theater in Uruguay and since its creation, it has performed in multiple venues in Montevideo and has regularly toured both within the country and internationally over the course of nearly seven decades. Throughout its history, it has included prominent Uruguayan actors in its ensemble.

== History ==
The Comedia Nacional was founded on April 21, 1947. In the early 1940s, in an effort to promote and consolidate cultural expression in the country, the Uruguayan government began establishing an institutional framework for artistic activities. In 1946, Héctor Laborde, the manager of the Official Service for Broadcasting, Performances and Entertainment, proposed the idea of creating a state-owned theater company, but the proposed bill was left unaddressed.

At the same time, during the administration of Intendant Andrés Martínez Trueba, the Intendancy of Montevideo established the Commission of Municipal Theaters, chaired by playwright and politician Justino Zavala Muniz, to advise on the management and administration of municipal theaters. The goal was to foster national culture and artistic production, as at that time the city had numerous movie theaters but few permanent theater venues. The Municipal School of Music and the Municipal School of Dramatic Art were also created in this endeavor.

The commission's responsibility was to establish a national, stable theater company. In the months following its creation, auditions for actors were held, and on October 2, 1947, the company's first production, El león ciego (The Blind Lion) by Ernesto Herrera, premiered at the Solís Theatre.
