= Arnaldo André =

Paraguayan actor (born 1943)

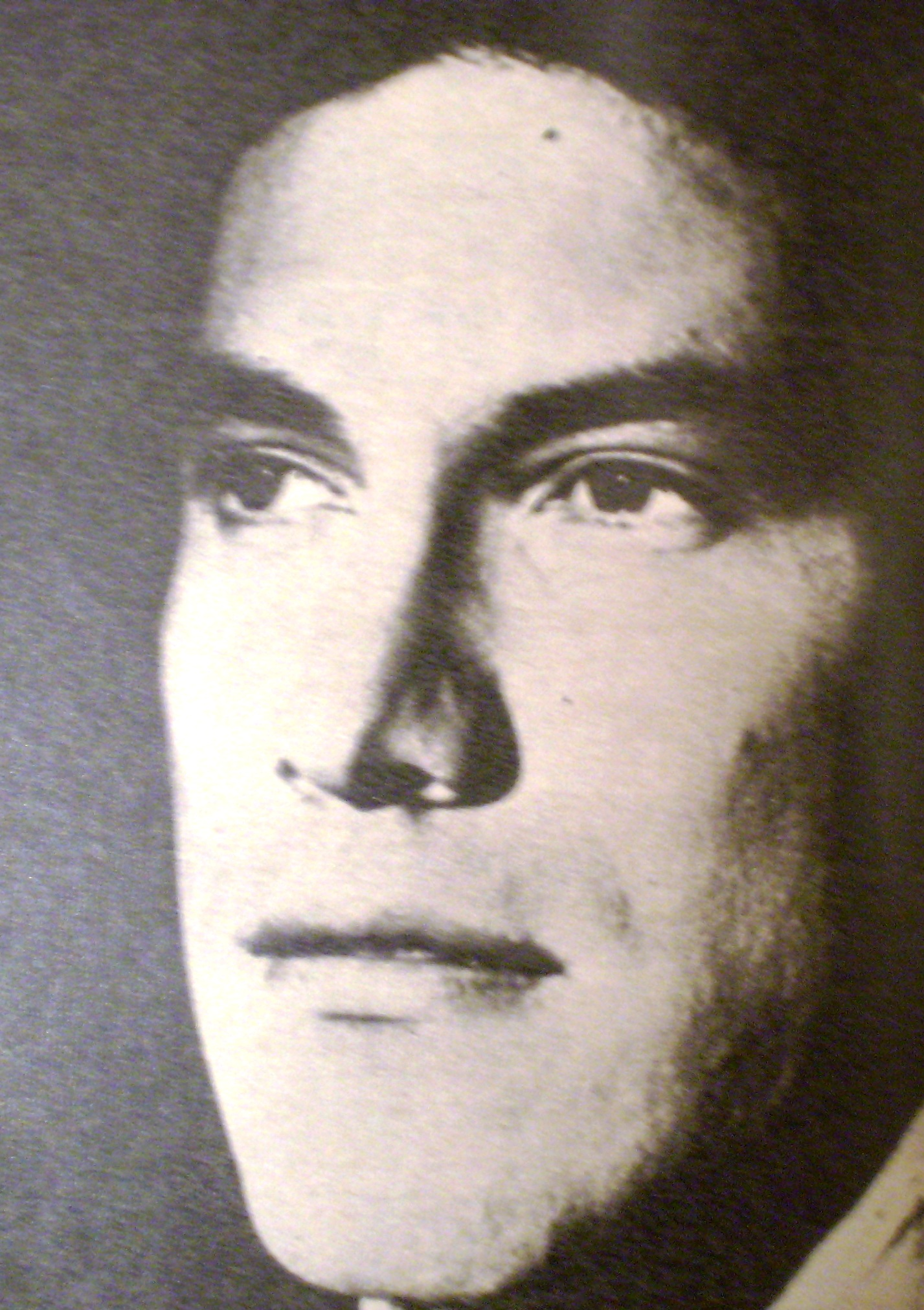
- Born: Andrés Pacuá Zaracho; November 12, 1943 (age 82); San Bernardino, Paraguay
- Awards: 2009 Martín Fierro award

Arnaldo André (born November 12, 1943) is a Paraguayan actor for soap-operas. He spent most of his career in Argentina, where he has been active since 1964. He earned a Martín Fierro award in 2010, and his most recent work was in the Los únicos TV series. He also acted in Puerto Rico.

== Biography ==
Arnaldo André was born in San Bernardino, Paraguay, in 1943. His father died when he was aged 11, and he took care of his family since then. He grew up influenced by American and Italian Movies, and initially intended to make a name in Argentina and, from there, move to other countries. However, as his career developed, he did not follow this initial plan. He did not become a movie actor either, working mainly in TV telenovelas and productions by Alberto Migré a well-known Argentine writer and TV producer in protagonic couples with Soledad Silveyra. His work in TV allowed some occasional works in theater and cinema, and also works at telenovelas in other South American countries.

Arnaldo Andre made many protagonic couples with Luisa Kuliok. His character from Amo y Señor was noted for his slapping of his wife. The first slap was used in a promotion of the telenovela at its early stages, and the positive popular reception turned this into a cliché. He kept on slapping his fellow actresses in later telenovelas, and always slapped them for real; which caused an incident with Giselle Blondet, who was not aware of it. Arnaldo André retired his slapping act after Carlos Monzón was sentenced for the death of his wife, in a widely publicized trial. Nowadays, Arnaldo André thinks that he would not do a similar character, because of the public concern about corporal punishment in the home. He also thinks that feminism is greater now than in the 1980s, and a female character submissive to corporal punishment would not be considered realistic by the public anymore.

Arnaldo André worked as the main villain of the Valientes telenovela, which is among the most successful Argentine telenovelas. This was the first time he played character of a villain instead of a gentleman, as he thought he had exhausted the role during his career. Even so, as a villain he used little physical violence, working instead like a crime boss. He earned the 2009 Martín Fierro award as best male lead actor of telenovela with this work. He worked during 2011 in the superhero live-action television series Los únicos.

== Works ==
=== TV ===
Filmography
Year	Telenovela	Character
1964	El amor tiene cara de mujer	
1968	Ufa con el sexo	
1972	Rolando Rivas, taxista	Juan Marcelo
1973	Pobre diabla	Ariel Mejia Guzmán
1974	Mi hombre sin noche	Santiago Yáñez
1975	Piel naranja	Juan Manuel Alinari
1976	Los que estamos solos	Mariano Mayol
1977	El hombre que yo inventé	Enrique
1977	Rafaela	Juan José Hernández
1978	María del Mar	Víctor Manuel Galíndez
1980	Fabián 2 Mariana 0	Fabián
1981	Tremenda Venganza	
1981	Mi querido doctor	
1983	Amor gitano	Renzo Chamorro
1984	Amo y señor	Alonso Miranda
1985	El infiel	Mariano Romero
1986	El seductor	Don Julio Olmedo
1986	El lobo	Salvador Rivero
1987	El vidente	Reinaldo Herrera
1987	Por Amor	Bruno Sánchez
1988	Amándote	Martín Arana
1990	Amándote II	Martín Arana
1990	Romanzo	Marcelo Cardona
1991	Río de fuego	Augusto Luna
1992	Corazones de fuego	Agustín Casenave
1993	Gerente de familia	Juan
1996	Gino	Luis A. "Gino" Spadalacua
1996	Verdad consecuencia	Luis. A. 'Gino' Spadalacua
1997	Ricos y famosos	Gerardo Murúa
2000	Pobre Diabla	Andrés Mejía Guzmán
2000	Abrázame muy fuerte	Dr. Ángel Luis Robles
2001	Felina	Asdrúbal
2002	Lejana cómo el viento	Jorge
2003	Soy gitano	Lázaro Jesús Heredia
2004	Piel naranja años después	Juan Manuel Alinari
2004	La Gorda y la traición	Sebastian Prusi
2005	Ánimo Juan	Juan
2006	Se dice amor	Pablo Cuevas
2009	Valientes	Laureano Gómez Acuña
2011	Los únicos	Alfredo Monterrey

=== Cinema ===
Filmography
Year	Film	Character
1968	Ufa con el sexo (censored)	
1970	Los Muchachos de mi barrio	
1971	Argentino hasta la muerte	
1971	Balada para un mochilero	
1971	Un guapo del 900	
1972	Mi amigo Luis	
1973	José María y María José: Una pareja de hoy	
2008	La Extranjera	Juan
2009	La Confesión	
2009	El niño pez	Sócrates Espina
2013	Lectura Según Justino	As director
