= Jesulín de Ubrique =

Spanish torero or 'bullfighter' (born 1974)

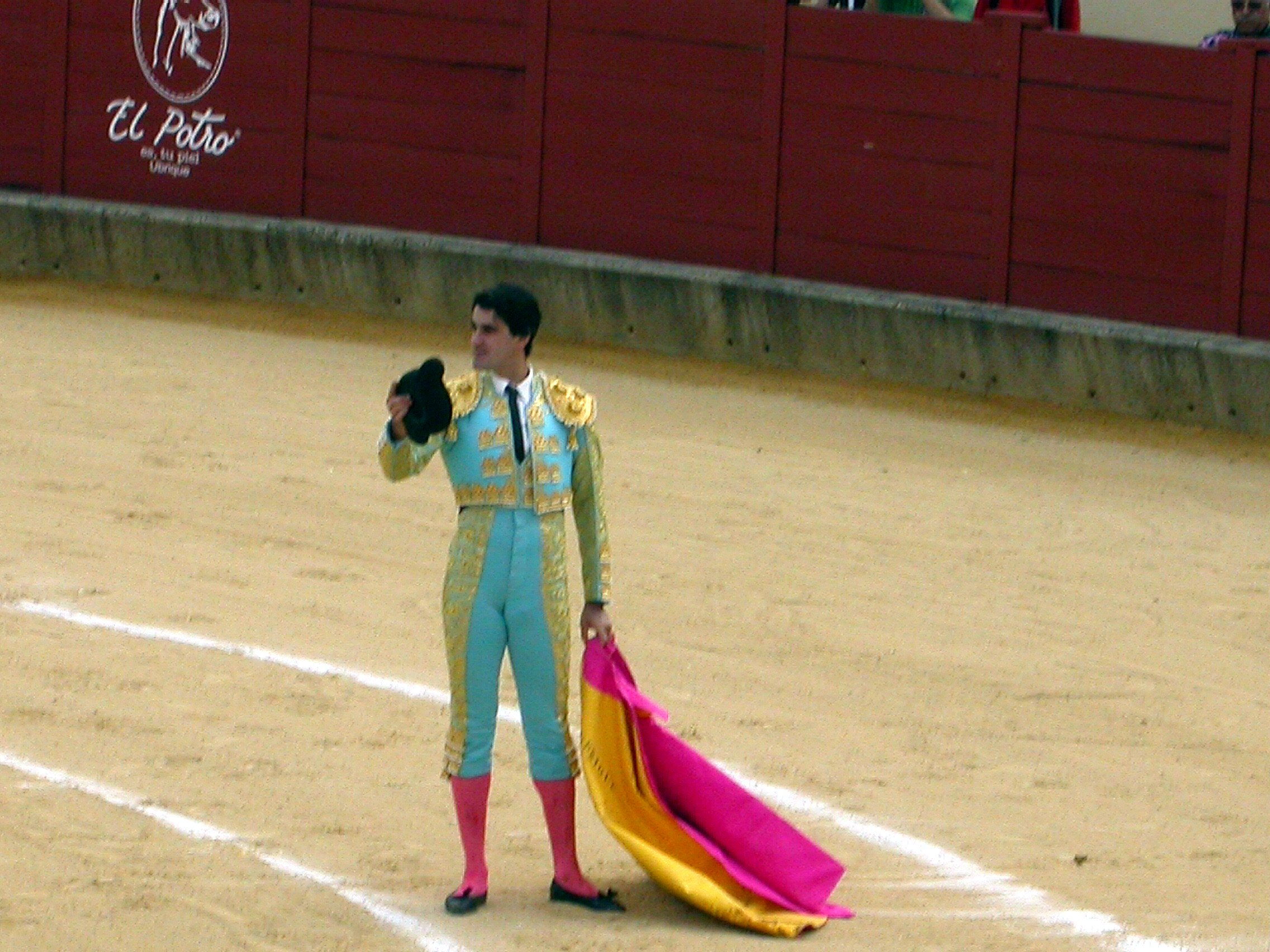
- Born: Jesús Janeiro Bazán; January 9, 1974 (age 51); Ubrique (Cádiz), Spain
- Occupation: Bullfighter
- Spouse: María José Campanario (m. 2002)
- Children: 4
- Parent(s): María del Carmen Bazán Domínguez; Humberto Janeiro López (1943-2020)

Jesús Janeiro Bazán (born 9 January 1974 in Ubrique, Cádiz), better known as Jesulín de Ubrique, is a Spanish torero or bullfighter.

== Biography ==
Son of Humberto Janeiro López (Ubrique, 1 November 1943 - Jerez de la Frontera, 9 August 2020) and María del Carmen Bazán Domínguez (El Bosque, Andalusia, 24 December 1945), he has three brothers: the pilot Humberto Janeiro Bazán (19 January 1972), the former model Carmen Janeiro Bazán La Jesulina (10 March 1976) and bullfighter Víctor Manuel Janeiro Bazán (5 April 1979).

He attended the Bullfighting School of Cádiz. He first wore the traje de luces ("suit of lights") at El Bosque on 22 August 1987. He debuted with horses in Ronda on 30 April 1987, with the bull "Ambiciones" of Manolo González accompanied by Julio Aparicio and Finito de Córdoba, cutting two ears. In 1989 he won the famous "Zapato de Oro" ("Golden Shoe") in the heifers with picks of Arnedo (La Rioja).

He received the alternativa in Nîmes, France, on 21 September 1990, with José Mari Manzanares as godfather and Emilio Muñoz as witness, with the bull "Correcostas" of González Sánchez-Dalp. That afternoon he cut off an ear and was dressed in white and gold.

His presentation in Las Ventas was on 25 May 1992, where the godfather was José Ortega Cano and witness Julio César Rincón, with the bull "Malahierba" of the Marquis of Docmecq. With a style inspired by Paco Ojeda, but more vertical, he was neat, cold and heterodox in his early days as a matador. He is a bullfighter with a great deal of technique and mettle.

His consecration was in 1994, leading the ladder with 153 bullfights and cutting 339 ears. He caused a scandal by inviting his proxy, Manolo Morilla, to bullfight, which cost him a severe fine. The following year (1995) he broke his record, again topping the ladder with 161 runs and 279 ears cut. In the opinion of the experts, this saturation of bullfights clearly harmed his style (although it made him immensely rich), turning it cold and detached. His extravagances of wearing yellow, putting a python in his mouth or climbing on top of a bull were widely criticized.

In 1996 he bullfighted 121 runs in Spain; in 1997 he played 87; in 1998 he played 79; in 1999 he bullfighted 11 runs and retired on April 22, reappearing in 2001 when he bullfighted 73 runs in Spain, being the 4th of the ladder; in 2003 he played 77 (5th); in 2004 he bullfighted 55; in 2005 he bullfighted 62; in 2006 he bullfighted 57 and in 2007 he tore 77 (6th).

In parallel with his popularity as a bullfighter, Jesulín began to give more personal interviews for the magazines of the heart, becoming the most famous bullfighter in the pink press. In 1994 he offered a free run only for women in Aranjuez (Madrid). Since then Jesulín is also known by the nickname of "the bullfighter of women". At this time he entered the world of song, recording an album, which included the well-known song "Toda" and versions of songs by other artists, such as "Locos por Amor" ("Crazy for Love") by Francesc Picas (former member of Locomía), or "Háblame del mar, marinero" ("Speak to me about the sea, sailor") by Marisol. In addition, in 1995 he proclaimed the Carnival of Cadiz.

In 1999, he took only 11 runs and, at only 25 years old, decided to retire temporarily from the ring for lack of motivation. In the season of 2001 he reappeared in the Plaza de Olivenza (Province of Badajoz, Spain), with the intention of fighting fewer bulls, recovering the good feelings of his time as a bullfighter.

In 2001 he was in a very serious automobile accident.

In January 2003 the City Council of Ubrique awarded him the medal of the town in the gold category for having made the name of his hometown famous throughout the bullfighting world. After a voluntary retirement of almost two years, he returned to the ring on 8 March 2010, in the first run of the Feria de La Magdalena de Castellón de la Plana.

Subsequently, Jesulín moved away from public life, until he appeared in several television programs during the years 2013 and 2014. He also debuted as an actor, appearing with Santiago Segura in the film Torrente 5: Operación Eurovegas.

A museum and monument dedicated to Jesulín are located in the bullring of his hometown.

== Personal life ==
In 1995 he began a relationship with María Belén Esteban Menéndez, with whom he had his first daughter, Andrea Janeiro Esteban, born on 20 July 1999 in Madrid. The couple separated shortly thereafter.

In November 2001 he celebrated his engagement to María José Campanario Torres (b. Barcelona, 28 May 1979), whom he married on 27 July 2002 in Sanlúcar la Mayor. He has two children with his second wife: Julia Janeiro Campanario (Seville, 18 April 2003) and Jesús Alejandro Janeiro Campanario (Jerez de la Frontera, 6 March 2007). He currently lives in Arcos de la Frontera (Cádiz).

== See also ==
- List of bullfighters
