= Thelma Biral =

Argentine actress

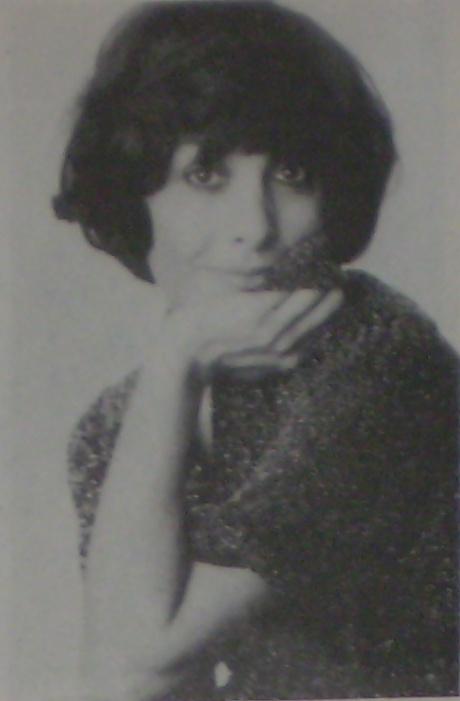
Thelma Biral

Thelma Biral (born December 17, 1941) is an Argentine actress working in cinema, television and theatre.

== Life and work ==
Thelma Biral was born in Buenos Aires to Otello and Sira Biral, recently arrived Italian immigrants from the Veneto Region. The family relocated to Montevideo, Uruguay, in 1945, and Biral later enrolled at the Italian Lyceum, a prestigious secondary school. A precocious actress, Biral began directing school plays at age 12 and, following the attendance of one of these by Orestes Caviglia, the veteran theatre director recommended her to the National Dramatic Arts School.

Graduating at only 14 years of age, Biral applied for admission into the National Comedy of Uruguay. The institution's director, Margarita Xirgu, allowed the young talent to claim she was 18 - the prerequisite for admission. There, she met Oscar Pedemonte, and the couple married in 1963. That year, Xirgu recommended her young protégé to Buenos Aires' important San Martín Theatre, at the time mounting a televised production of Federico García Lorca's Yerma. Hired as an understudy to Spanish actress María Casares, her performance opened doors for her in Argentine television. She was cast in 1964 for a leading role in a Soap opera, El amor tiene cara de mujer (Love Has a Woman's Face), and following numerous other appearances in the genre, she was given her first film role in Julio Saraceni's 1967 romantic comedy Villa cariño (Love Town).

Biral continued to perform in the theatre, remaining prominent on the stage as a comic actress. Among her numerous stage performances after becoming a household name on television was opposite veteran comic Niní Marshall in Roberto Romero's Coqueluche (1972). That year, Biral had her only child, Bruno Pedemonti (who became a noted actor in his own right). She was cast by noted period piece director Leopoldo Torre Nilsson for two thrillers: La maffia (1972) and Los siete locos (Seven Madmen), the following year. The latter role earned Biral a Journalists' Association Award for Best Dramatic Actress. She returned to soaps in 1976 for Alberto Migré's Dos a quererse (Two for Love) and in 1980, accepted perhaps her most memorable role as an alcoholic in Fernando Ayala's Desde el abismo (From the Abyss). This (her second collaboration with Ayala) earned her a second Journalists' Association Award. She starred opposite Héctor Alterio in Héctor Olivera's Los Viernes de la eternidad (Fridays in Eternity), in 1981. She was given a Press Prize for the role; but, for years afterwards, she limited her performances to the theatre, where she earned plaudits for protagonizing James Sparks' Sparks and Bernard Slade's Soufflé. From 1991 to 1996, alongside Nora Cárpena, Graciela Dufau, Susana Campos, Moria Casán, she successfully starred Santiago Moncada's Brujas, directed by Luis Agustoni. She accepted a role in a 1994 edition of her first soap opera, "Love Has a Woman's Face," and in 1997, portrayed a struggling artist's estranged mother in Fernando Díaz's Plaza de almas.

Biral led a local 1997 production of Michael Christopher's play, The Lady and the Clarinet, and more recently, Werner Schwab's The Presidents and Athol Fugard's The Road to Mecca, among numerous other plays and television appearances.
