= Ana Rosa Quintana =

Spanish journalist and television presenter (born 1956)

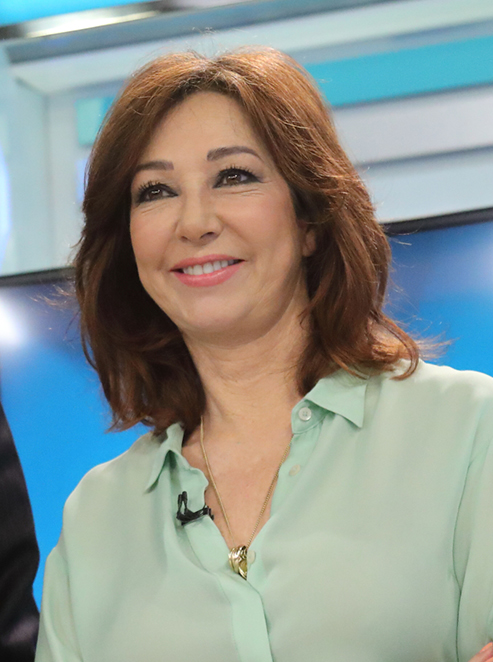
- Quintana in 2018
- Born: Ana Rosa Quintana Hortal; 12 January 1956 (age 70); Madrid, Spain
- Occupations: Journalist; Radio presenter Television personality
- Years active: 1982–present
- Known for: Sabor a ti (1998–2004); El programa de Ana Rosa (2005–2023, 2025–present); TardeAR (2023–2025)
- Spouse(s): Alfonso Rojo (m. 1983; div. 1987) Juan Muñoz (m. 2005)
- Children: 3

Ana Rosa Quintana Hortal (born 12 January 1956) is a Spanish journalist and television presenter. Having originally started out in radio, she rose to fame on Antena 3's daytime chat show Sabor a ti. She later jumped ship to Telecinco to host El programa de Ana Rosa, which frequently led the ratings from 2005 until it was axed in 2023.

In 2005, Quintana interviewed Ramona Maneiro, who admitted on Sabor a ti (es) to having assisted Ramón Sampedro in taking his own life. She left Antena 3 that year for Telecinco, where she presented her most famous show, El programa de Ana Rosa, until a schedule update in 2023 saw her move to the afternoon slot with the show TardeAR. After her new show failed to beat Sonsoles Ónega's show Y ahora, Sonsoles in the ratings, Telecinco revived El programa de Ana Rosa in 2025, which has been daily defeated by its competition.

== Biography ==
Ana Rosa was born and grew up in Usera, Madrid. Her parents were José Antonio Quintana and Carmen Hortal Prados, and she has one older brother, Enrique.

She began her career at RNE. She later moved to Radio Internacional, where she was one of the so-called "chicas de la Inter", a group of female presenters on the channel.

In 1982 she moved to television to host the primetime Telediario bulletin with Alberto Delgado. She later moved with her husband Alfonso Rojo to New York, working as a correspondent for Cadena COPE and the Tiempo de Hoy magazine. She had one son with Alberto in 1986.

After she and Rojo separated in 1987 she returned to Spain to direct and present the show Las tardes de RCE on Radiocadena Española. She later joined the radio stations Radio 80 and Antena 3 Radio, where she presented the channels' news bulletins. She also appeared as a guest on Radio Voz's show De viva voz. On TV she swapped to Telecinco to present the court show Veredicto, the Spanish version of the Italian show Forum, until 1995.

At the start of 1997 she moved to Antena 3, to host daytime chat show Sinceramente Ana Rosa Quintana. She later presented the show Extra Rosa with Rosa Villacastín, which regularly won the sobremesa timeslot.

In the summer of 1998, she left Extra Rosa to present daytime magazine show Sabor a ti. Premiered in June 1998, it was meant to last as summer filler, but its surprise success led Antena 3 to commission a longer series. The show eventually lasted for six series, making Ana Rosa one of Antena 3's most well-known figures. In December 2000, she and her son Enrique formed their own production company, Cuarzo Producciones. From 2001, Cuarzo took over production of Sabor a ti. That year she formed her own magazine, La Revista de Ana Rosa, published monthly. In 2004, she voiced a newsreader on the Spanish dub of The Incredibles.

In 2004, Antena 3 declined to renew Sabor a ti after a steady drop in audiences. In September of that year it was announced that she would return to Telecinco to launch a new show competing with María Teresa Campos, whose programme Cada día replaced Sabor a ti on Antena 3. Launched on 18 January 2005, El programa de Ana Rosa quickly rose to lead the timeslot on Telecinco, with Cada día being axed after just one year. El programa de Ana Rosa led the timeslot continuously for eighteen years.

On 19 June 2014, she led Telecinco's coverage of the proclamation of Felipe VI becoming monarch, together with Pedro Piqueras and Jesús Cintora.

In 2017, Cuarzo Producciones was sold to Banijay Entertainment. In 2019 she hosted the first series of Telecinco's show Mujeres al poder. In 2023, El programa de Ana Rosa was axed owing to a schedule shake-up, and Ana Rosa moved to present a new show in the late afternoon, called TardeAR, which she said she hoped would be "a programme that will surprise and hopes to be the best news show on TV in Spain." After failing to meet expectations, going up against Sonsoles Ónega on Antena 3, Telecinco announced that El programa de Ana Rosa would return at the start of February 2025.

== Controversies ==
In 2000, Planeta published Quintana´s debut novel Sabor a hiel, based on stories of mistreated women who had appeared on Sabor a ti. The book became a bestseller, with more than 100,000 copies sold in a partnership with Ana Botella, the wife of Prime Minister José María Aznar. A short while after it went on sale, it was alleged that parts of the novel had been plagiarised from Danielle Steel's work Family Album. It was initially blamed on a computer fault, yet once a corrected version went on sales the Interviú magazine noticed other passages plagiarised from Ángeles Mastretta's 1985 short story Women with Big Eyes. In a statement, Quintana confirmed rumours that she hadn't actually written the book, blaming her ghostwriter, her former brother-in-law David Rojo, for the plagiarism. Publisher Planeta removed the book from sale.

On 25 February 2011, the wife of murderer Santiago del Valle was sent to prison after admitting on El programa de Ana Rosa that she knew he had in fact killed five-year-old girl Mari Luz. The case had been investigated in the mid-2000s but neither party admitted it. Some days later, the newspaper El Mundo criticised Ana Rosa's treatment of Ms. del Valle in getting the scoop, and the police opened an investigation into her and Telecinco. The case was shelved in May 2011 after police felt Ana Rosa's actions did not constitute a crime. Eight journalists at Cuarzo Producciones working on the story were also cleared.

In April 2011, the Supreme Court ordered Ana Rosa and Cuarzo Producciones to pay bullfighter Finito de Córdoba and his wife, former TV presenter Arantxa del Sol, €100,000 for defamation, after commenting on the show about rumours of his infidelity.

On 28 August 2012, on the discovery of remains in the José Bretón case Ana Rosa left her holiday early to return to her programme to present an exclusive about the case. Many viewers criticised the programme for using the discovery of children's remains to boost ratings.

In 2016, she hosted 26J. Quiero gobernar, a show where children asked politicians coming up to the 2016 election questions as though they were adult journalists. While intended as a light-hearted show to get children interested in politics, it was criticised for interviews seen as uncomfortable, and Telecinco was criticised for using children to deliver gimmicky questions.

In 2017, after denouncing violence against women on a TV special about her, La reina de las mañanas, she was recorded remarking that "it's good to me that she did his face in", not realising her microphone was still on. After social media users criticised a perceived double standard on these comments, Ana Rosa alleged her words had been taken out of context.

=== Allegations of bias ===
Every so often, Ana Rosa has been accused of giving misleading information in favour of her personal political, economical or social interests. She has been noted to show admiration for certain political figures, such as the PP leader of the Community of Madrid, Isabel Díaz Ayuso. Some of her programme's headlines have been critical of the coalition government in the early to mid-2020s. Her programme has also been noted to include headlines criticising the cost of living and especially the left-wing Podemos party, such as "Podemos offensive against landlords of tourist flats", "Podemos go against any business initiatives and ways of making money", before in May 2023 it was revealed that she owned forty-four tourist flats herself in Madrid and Seville, as well as other properties including four large homes and a large garage space.

== Filmography ==
=== Television ===
Year	Title	Channel	Role
1994–1995	Veredicto	Tele 5	Presenter
1995–1996	Nunca es tarde	Tele 5	Presenter
1997	Sinceramente Ana Rosa Quintana	Antena 3	Presenter
1997–1998	Extra Rosa	Antena 3	Presenter
1998–2004	Sabor a ti	Antena 3	Presenter
2005–2023, 2025–present	El programa de Ana Rosa	Telecinco	Presenter
2013	Al otro lado	Telecinco	Presenter
2015	Pequeños gigantes	Telecinco	Guest
2016	26J. Quiero gobernar	Telecinco	Presenter
2019	Mujeres al poder	Telecinco	Presenter
2021	Erguidos frente a todo	Telecinco	Presenter
2023–2025	TardeAR	Telecinco	Presenter

== Personal life ==
She had a son, Álvaro, in 1986, with her former spouse Alfonso Rojo. She had twins Juan and Jaime in 2004, when she was 48 years old, with her current husband Juan Muñoz. In 2021, she announced that she had breast cancer, and took a break from television.
