= Pedro Carrasco =

Spanish boxer (1943–2001)

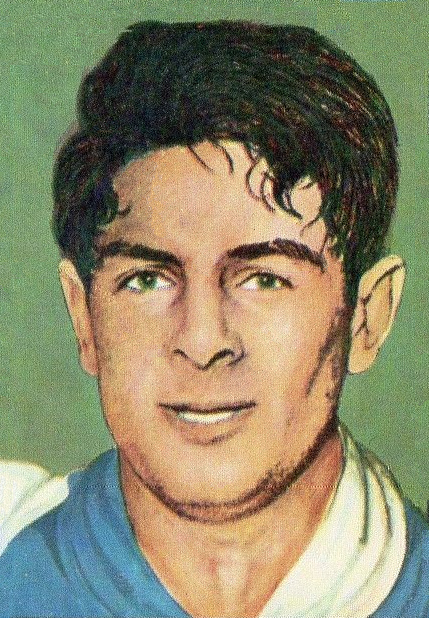

Personal information
- Nationality: Spanish
- Born: Pedro Juan Carrasco García; 11 July 1943 Alosno, Spain
- Died: 27 January 2001 (aged 57) Madrid, Spain
- Height: 5 ft 9 in (175 cm)
- Weight: Lightweight; Light welterweight

Boxing career
- Stance: Orthodox

Boxing record
- Total fights: 110
- Wins: 105
- Win by KO: 67
- Losses: 3
- Draws: 2

Pedro Juan Carrasco García (11 July 1943 – 27 January 2001) was a Spanish boxer whose fame transcended the boxing ring. During the 1970s, he was a media darling in Spain.

== Professional career ==
Carrasco was crowned European Lightweight champion in 1967. This triumph was followed four years later, in 1971, with a victory over Mando Ramos in Madrid by disqualification in 11 rounds for the WBC's world Lightweight title. The victory was marred by controversy because Carrasco won the title while lying on the canvas: he had been hit in the head by Ramos. The fight's referee expressed confusion as to whether the blow was legal, but he decided to call it an illegal blow and raised Carrasco's hand in signal of victory. Carrasco immediately became a national hero in Spain, as Spain's second-ever world boxing champion.

Carrasco, who was a culturally educated fighter, became a sensation with the media, especially with tabloid magazines, and he started to be seen with Spanish show business stars. His picture appeared on the covers of such magazines as ¡Hola! many times. He married the singer Rocío Jurado, with whom he had a daughter, Rocío Carrasco. He was also married to Raquel Mosquera for five years.

In 1971, and because of the controversial nature of his world championship win over Ramos, the WBC ordered a rematch, and it was fought in Los Angeles. There, the fight was controversial again, this time because Carrasco looked to most onlookers and fans to be clearly the winner but the decision was favorable to Ramos and he retook the title. They had another rematch, and Ramos beat Carrasco again.

Carrasco's career boxing record was 106–3–2 (66 KOs). After beginning his career 12–1–1, Carrasco had a streak on which he went 92–0–1. The draw came after Carrasco had won 83 consecutive fights. This undefeated streak was longer than Julio César Chávez's (90–0–1). Chávez's streak, however, was from the beginning of the career, and he was 87–0 before the draw.

== Professional boxing record ==
110 fights	105 wins	3 losses
By knockout	67	0
By decision	34	3
By disqualification	4	0
Draws	2	

No.	Result	Record	Opponent	Type	Round, time	Date	Location	Notes
110	Win	105–3–2	Beau Jaynes	TKO	6 (10)	1972-12-01	Pabellón Polideportivo del Real Madrid, Madrid, Spain	
109	Win	104–3–2	Enrico Barlatti	TKO	4 (10)	1972-09-22	Gran Price, Barcelona, Spain	
108	Loss	103–3–2	Mando Ramos	SD	15 (15)	1972-06-28	Palacio de los Deportes, Madrid, Spain	For WBC lightweight title
107	Loss	103–2–2	Mando Ramos	SD	15 (15)	1972-02-18	Sports Arena, Los Angeles, California, U.S.	Lost WBC lightweight title
106	Win	103–1–2	Mando Ramos	DQ	12 (15)	1971-11-05	Palacio de los Deportes, Madrid, Spain	Won vacant WBC lightweight title
105	Win	102–1–2	Jerry Wells	TKO	5 (10)	1971-09-10	Plaza de Toros de Vista Alegre, Bilbao, Spain	
104	Win	101–1–2	Bruno Meggiolaro	PTS	10 (10)	1971-07-30	Campo del Gas, Madrid, Spain	
103	Win	100–1–2	Klaus Jacoby	KO	3 (10)	1971-07-08	Plaza de Toros, Zaragoza, Spain	
102	Win	99–1–2	David Pesenti	DQ	10 (10)	1971-06-18	La Monumental, Barcelona, Spain	
101	Win	98–1–2	Rene Roque	UD	15 (15)	1971-05-21	Palacio de los Deportes, Madrid, Spain	Won EBU super lightweight title
100	Win	97–1–2	Jake Gulino	KO	9 (10)	1971-04-17	Milan, Italy	
99	Win	96–1–2	Pietro Vargellini	TKO	5 (10)	1971-02-19	Palacio de los Deportes, Madrid, Spain	
98	Win	95–1–2	Joe Tetteh	PTS	10 (10)	1970-12-26	Madrid, Spain	
97	Draw	94–1–2	Joe Tetteh	PTS	10 (10)	1970-11-20	Gran Price, Barcelona, Spain	
96	Win	94–1–1	Thomas Matthews	TKO	2 (8)	1970-09-04	Campo del Gas, Madrid, Spain	
95	Win	93–1–1	Olli Mäki	PTS	10 (10)	1970-08-22	Valencia, Spain	
94	Win	92–1–1	Jean Pierre Le Jaouen	TKO	6 (10)	1970-06-26	Palacio de los Deportes, Madrid, Spain	
93	Win	91–1–1	Carlos Almeida	TKO	5 (8)	1970-06-13	Plaza de Toros, Almería, Spain	
92	Win	90–1–1	Jose Jaime Marquez Pereyra	KO	2 (8)	1970-05-22	Palacio de los Deportes, Madrid, Spain	
91	Win	89–1–1	Lakdar El Harizi	KO	6 (10)	1970-03-18	Valencia, Spain	
90	Win	88–1–1	Jose Luis Vallejo	TKO	2 (10)	1970-03-04	Pabellón de La Casilla, Bilbao, Spain	
89	Win	87–1–1	Dave Wyatt	TKO	3 (10)	1970-02-19	Gran Price, Barcelona, Spain	
88	Win	86–1–1	Jake Gulino	TKO	6 (10)	1970-01-29	Palacio de los Deportes, Madrid, Spain	
87	Win	85–1–1	Massimo Consolati	TKO	3 (10)	1970-01-15	Estadio Insular, Las Palmas, Spain	
86	Win	84–1–1	Dino Del Cid	DQ	2 (10)	1969-12-30	Palacio de los Deportes, Barcelona, Spain	
85	Win	83–1–1	Vic Andreetti	TKO	10 (10)	1969-12-19	Palacio de los Deportes, Madrid, Spain	
84	Win	82–1–1	Giampiero Salami	TKO	6 (10)	1969-11-22	PalaEur, Roma, Italy	
83	Win	81–1–1	Bill Whittenburg	TKO	5 (10)	1969-11-07	Palacio de los Deportes, Madrid, Spain	
82	Win	80–1–1	Victor Baerga	TKO	4 (10)	1969-10-23	Pabellón del Centro Deportivo Municipal, Vigo, Spain	
81	Win	79–1–1	Paul Rourre	TKO	9 (10)	1969-09-27	Valencia, Spain	
80	Win	78–1–1	Angel Robinson Garcia	PTS	10 (10)	1969-09-10	Plaza de Toros de Vista Alegre, Bilbao, Spain	
79	Win	77–1–1	Massimo Consolati	RTD	4 (10)	1969-08-06	Plaza de Toros de Vista Alegre, Bilbao, Spain	
78	Win	76–1–1	Paul Rourre	TKO	6 (10)	1969-07-24	Campo de Fútbol de Arana, Ordizia, Spain	
77	Win	75–1–1	Miguel Velasquez	PTS	15 (15)	1969-06-13	Palacio de los Deportes, Madrid, Spain	Retained EBU lightweight title
76	Win	74–1–1	Klaus Jacoby	KO	2 (10)	1969-04-17	Gran Price, Barcelona, Spain	
75	Win	73–1–1	Ould Makloufi	KO	6 (10)	1969-03-29	Malaga, Spain	
74	Win	72–1–1	Tore Magnussen	TKO	3 (15)	1969-03-06	Palacio de los Deportes, Barcelona, Spain	Retained EBU lightweight title
73	Win	71–1–1	Jose Luiz Penteado	DQ	4 (10)	1969-01-02	K.B. Hallen, Copenhagen, Denmark	
72	Win	70–1–1	Al Rocca	TKO	3 (10)	1968-12-05	Gran Price, Barcelona, Spain	
71	Win	69–1–1	Kid Rainbow	TKO	3 (10)	1968-11-16	Pabellón del Centro Deportivo Municipal, Vigo, Spain	
70	Win	68–1–1	Olli Mäki	PTS	15 (15)	1968-10-18	Plaza de Toros, Valencia, Spain	Retained EBU lightweight title
69	Win	67–1–1	Bruno Melissano	TKO	3 (15)	1968-09-13	La Monumental, Barcelona, Spain	Retained EBU lightweight title
68	Win	66–1–1	Valerio Nunez	TKO	3 (10)	1968-08-10	Plaza de Toros, Valladolid, Spain	
67	Win	65–1–1	Serafino Lucherini	PTS	10 (10)	1968-07-31	Plaza de Toros, Valencia, Spain	
66	Win	64–1–1	Jose Luiz Penteado	TKO	3 (10)	1968-07-20	Pabellón del Centro Deportivo Municipal, Vigo, Spain	
65	Win	63–1–1	Kid Tano	KO	8 (15)	1968-05-10	Palacio de los Deportes, Madrid, Spain	Retained EBU lightweight title
64	Win	62–1–1	Enrique Levy	TKO	4 (10)	1968-04-07	Plaza de Toros de La Merced, Huelva, Spain	
63	Win	61–1–1	Giampiero Salami	TKO	4 (10)	1968-03-19	Valencia, Spain	
62	Win	60–1–1	Eduardo Batista	RTD	2 (10)	1968-03-10	Santa Cruz de Tenerife, Spain	
61	Win	59–1–1	Paul Rourre	TKO	4 (10)	1968-02-04	Estadio Insular, Las Palmas, Spain	
60	Win	58–1–1	Franco Brondi	TKO	4 (10)	1967-12-22	Palacio de los Deportes, Madrid, Spain	
59	Win	57–1–1	Hector Omar Oliva	TKO	4 (10)	1967-12-15	Pabellón de La Casilla, Bilbao, Spain	
58	Win	56–1–1	Aldo Pravisani	PTS	10 (10)	1967-12-01	Palacio de los Deportes, Madrid, Spain	
57	Win	55–1–1	Børge Krogh	RTD	8 (15)	1967-06-30	Las Ventas, Madrid, Spain	Won EBU lightweight title
56	Win	54–1–1	Jesse Green	TKO	3 (10)	1967-06-02	Palacio de los Deportes, Madrid, Spain	
55	Win	53–1–1	Angel Neches	PTS	10 (10)	1967-05-13	Salamanca, Spain	
54	Win	52–1–1	Abdelkader ben Bachir	KO	3 (8)	1967-04-29	Ring del Andalucía, Sevilla, Spain	
53	Win	51–1–1	Benito Gallardo	TKO	5 (10)	1967-04-08	Salamanca, Spain	
52	Win	50–1–1	Roy Ate	TKO	3 (10)	1966-10-07	Palacio de los Deportes, Madrid, Spain	
51	Win	49–1–1	Daniel Deneux	TKO	6 (10)	1966-09-22	Palacio de los Deportes, Barcelona, Spain	
50	Win	48–1–1	Boualem Belouard	TKO	3 (10)	1966-09-09	Las Ventas, Madrid, Spain	
49	Win	47–1–1	Tony Falcon	TKO	2 (10)	1966-09-02	Campo del Gas, Madrid, Spain	
48	Win	46–1–1	Joaquin Martin	TKO	5 (10)	1966-08-13	Plaza de Toros, Valencia, Spain	
47	Win	45–1–1	Pedro Gomez Acebo	TKO	3 (10)	1966-08-05	Campo del Gas, Madrid, Spain	
46	Win	44–1–1	Manuel Prieto	PTS	10 (10)	1966-07-17	Plaza de Toros, Valencia, Spain	
45	Win	43–1–1	Ricardo Navarro	TKO	4 (10)	1966-07-08	Palacio de los Deportes, Madrid, Spain	
44	Win	42–1–1	Vitor Alves	TKO	5 (8)	1966-06-28	Valencia, Spain	
43	Win	41–1–1	Karl Furcht	KO	3 (10)	1966-06-17	La Monumental, Barcelona, Spain	
42	Win	40–1–1	Dris ben Amar	TKO	3 (10)	1966-06-10	Palacio de los Deportes, Madrid, Spain	
41	Win	39–1–1	Vitor Alves	KO	3 (10)	1966-06-03	Palacio de los Deportes, Madrid, Spain	
40	Win	38–1–1	Quintino Soares	TKO	6 (10)	1966-05-26	Gran Price, Barcelona, Spain	
39	Win	37–1–1	Emilio Riccetti	PTS	10 (10)	1966-05-13	Palacio de los Deportes, Madrid, Spain	
38	Win	36–1–1	Mario Oberti	PTS	10 (10)	1966-03-31	Gran Price, Barcelona, Spain	
37	Win	35–1–1	Ameur Lamine	PTS	10 (10)	1966-03-17	Gran Price, Barcelona, Spain	
36	Win	34–1–1	Pierre Tirlo	TKO	8 (10)	1966-03-03	Gran Price, Barcelona, Spain	
35	Win	33–1–1	Georges Payen	KO	3 (10)	1966-02-17	Gran Price, Barcelona, Spain	
34	Win	32–1–1	Serafino Lucherini	PTS	8 (8)	1966-02-03	Gran Price, Barcelona, Spain	
33	Win	31–1–1	Roger Younsi	TKO	1 (8)	1966-01-20	Gran Price, Barcelona, Spain	
32	Win	30–1–1	Rene Roque	PTS	8 (8)	1965-12-13	PalaLido, Milan, Italy	
31	Win	29–1–1	Pedro Gomez Acebo	PTS	8 (8)	1965-10-30	Como, Italy	
30	Win	28–1–1	Mario Oberti	RTD	7 (10)	1965-09-19	Varese, Italy	
29	Win	27–1–1	Serafino Lucherini	TKO	7 (10)	1965-08-28	Gubbio, Italy	
28	Win	26–1–1	Cosimo Lacirignola	TKO	4 (8)	1965-07-09	Bergamo, Italy	
27	Win	25–1–1	Lat Shonibare	TKO	4 (8)	1965-06-28	Palazzetto dello Sport, Napoli, Italy	
26	Win	24–1–1	Vincenzo Pitardi	PTS	8 (8)	1965-02-19	Torino, Italy	
25	Win	23–1–1	Juan Pinto	PTS	8 (8)	1965-02-04	Palacio de los Deportes, Barcelona, Spain	
24	Win	22–1–1	Miguel Calderin	PTS	8 (8)	1964-12-23	Gran Price, Barcelona, Spain	
23	Win	21–1–1	Mohamed Halimi Laroussi	KO	3 (8)	1964-12-12	Basel, Switzerland	
22	Win	20–1–1	Pedro Gomez Acebo	PTS	8 (8)	1964-11-26	Gran Price, Barcelona, Spain	
21	Win	19–1–1	Aldo Pravisani	PTS	8 (8)	1964-10-16	Palasport, Torino, Italy	
20	Win	18–1–1	Cosimo Lacirignola	PTS	8 (8)	1964-09-19	Milan, Italy	
19	Win	17–1–1	Tristano Tartarini	PTS	8 (8)	1964-08-14	Falconara, Italy	
18	Win	16–1–1	Giancarlo Stelluti	TKO	5 (8)	1964-07-19	Falconara, Italy	
17	Win	15–1–1	Fortunato Munzone	TKO	6 (8)	1964-07-06	Sant'Angelo Lodigiano, Italy	
16	Win	14–1–1	Serafino Lucherini	PTS	8 (8)	1964-06-28	Saint-Vincent, Italy	
15	Win	13–1–1	Teresito Colombo	PTS	6 (6)	1964-05-16	Gallarate, Italy	
14	Win	12–1–1	Giuliano Scatolini	TKO	4 (8)	1964-04-22	PalaLido, Milan, Italy	
13	Loss	11–1–1	Aldo Pravisani	PTS	8 (8)	1964-03-11	PalaEur, Roma, Italy	
12	Win	11–0–1	Giuseppe Amante	PTS	8 (8)	1964-02-07	PalaLido, Milan, Italy	
11	Win	10–0–1	Juan Pinto	PTS	8 (8)	1963-08-24	Gran Price, Barcelona, Spain	
10	Win	9–0–1	Manuel Carvajal	PTS	8 (8)	1963-08-02	Plaza de toros de las Arenas, Barcelona, Spain	
9	Win	8–0–1	Franco Rosini	PTS	6 (6)	1963-05-27	Modena, Italy	
8	Draw	7–0–1	Franco Rosini	PTS	6 (6)	1963-05-10	Torino, Italy	
7	Win	7–0	Pietro Ziino	PTS	4 (4)	1963-03-29	Milan, Italy	
6	Win	6–0	Luciano Lambertini	TKO	4 (?)	1963-03-29	Milan, Italy	
5	Win	5–0	Emilio Riccetti	PTS	6 (6)	1963-02-22	PalaLido, Milan, Italy	
4	Win	4–0	Tristano Tartarini	PTS	6 (6)	1963-01-30	Milan, Italy	
3	Win	3–0	Franco Rosini	PTS	6 (6)	1963-01-09	Milan, Italy	
2	Win	2–0	Domenico Pillon	TKO	4 (6)	1962-11-27	Torino, Italy	
1	Win	1–0	Carlo Leggenda	TKO	2 (6)	1962-10-24	Imola, Italy	

== Death ==
Carrasco's died of a heart attack in 2001.

== See also ==
- List of world lightweight boxing champions

Sporting positions
Regional boxing titles
Preceded by Børge Krogh	EBU lightweight champion 30 June 1967 – 1969; Vacated	Vacant Title next held by Miguel Velasquez
Preceded by Rene Roque	EBU super lightweight champion 21 May 1971 – 1971; Vacated	Vacant Title next held by Roger Zami
World boxing titles
Vacant Title last held by Ken Buchanan	WBC lightweight champion 5 November 1971 – 18 February 1972	Succeeded by Mando Ramos
