= Entre mujeres =

1988 play by Santiago Moncada Mercadal

Entre mujeres ("Among Women"), later renamed Brujas ("Witches") is a 1988 play written by Spanish playwright Santiago Moncada.

== Plot ==
After 25 years apart, five women—all former students of a religious school—reunite at one of their homes, giving them the opportunity to recount their life stories and reminisce about their time at the school, which each of them perceived differently: Elena, the hostess, married to a high-ranking executive; Carlota, a bohemian writer; Luisa, a high-class prostitute; Hortensia, happily married; and Amelia, a lawyer whose marriage is in trouble.

== Notable performances ==
=== Spain ===
- Premiere, 29 July 1988: Teatro Maravillas, Madrid. Direction: Jesús Puente. With Ana María Vidal, Licia Calderón, Paca Gabaldón, Esther Gala and Sara Mora.
- 2010: Muñoz Seca Theater, Madrid. Direction: Manuel Galiana. With Lara Dibildos, Juncal Rivero, Arantxa del Sol, Carla Duval and Cristina Goyanes.

=== Argentina ===
This was the most successful performance in terms of time, spanning over 30 years.

- 1991: Teatro Atlas, Mar del Plata. Direction: Luis Agustoni. The original cast was Thelma Biral, Susana Campos, Nora Cárpena, Moria Casán, and Graciela Dufau.
  - 2000-2001, 2010-2011, and 2021-2025, in different theaters. Some of the original actresses were replaced successively by Leonor Benedetto, Luisa Kuliok, Sandra Mihanovich and María Leal.
- 2018: Teatro Candilejas, Villa Carlos Paz. Direction: Luis Agustoni. With Andrea Bonelli, Inés Estévez, Romina Ricci, Viviana Saccone, and María Socas.

=== Uruguay ===
- 1992: Teatro del Centro, Montevideo. Direction: Hugo Blandamuro. With Silvia Kliche, Filomena Gentile, Graciela Rodríguez, Susana Sellanes, and Lilián Anchorena.
  - 2009: with Alexandra Moncalvo, Adriana Do Reis, Silvana Grucci, Laura Martínez and the sexologist Carolina Villalba.

=== Mexico ===
- 1993: Polyforum Cultural Siqueiros, Mexico City. Direction: Marcos Miranda. With Rosa María Bianchi, Nuria Bages, Macaria, Silvia Mariscal and Raquel Olmedo.
