= Eduardo Franco =

Eduardo Franco may refer to:

- Eduardo Franco (actor) (born 1994), American actor and comedian
- Eduardo Franco (singer) (1945–1989), Uruguayan singer and composer
