= Juan Carlos Velázquez =

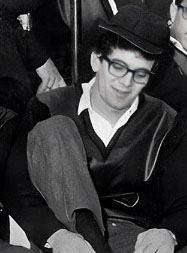

Background information
- Born: November 13, 1941 (age 84); Paysandú, Uruguay
- Died: May 5, 2022 (80 years old) Guayaquil, Ecuador
- Years active: 1958-2022
- Formerly of: Los Iracundos

Juan Carlos Velazqez was a renowned Uruguayan musician who was a member of the Los Iracundos band, all the way up until 2022 when he died.

== Biography ==
Juano was born on November 13 1941 in Pasayandu Uruguay. Initially he would study the bandoneon at the age of 10 due to the strong tango presence in Uruguay.

He would form the group Los Blue Kings in Uruguay in 1958 with five of his friends inspired by the rock and roll in the United States.

He debuted along with the rest of the band on October 10, 1961 at the Florencio Sánchez Theater.

In 1998 he stated that drums were "what captivated me the most and I will continue with them until the day I die."

For a time Velazquez and Leoni Franco were the last two members of Los Iracundos that hadn't split up which is when they hired Jorge Gatto.

He spent the last 20 years of his life in Guayaquil, Ecuador dedicated to exposing fakes of the original band.
