= Leoni Franco =

Uruguayan musician

- Born: Leonardo Franco; 1942; Uruguay
- Died: 1 December 2015 (aged 72–73) Guatemala City, Guatemala
- Genres: Rock and Roll, Ballads
- Instrument: Vocals
- Years active: 1958–2015
- Labels: RCA Records; Ariola Records; Discos Fuentes
- Website: http://losiracundos.org/sitio/

Leonardo Franco (1942 – 1 December 2015) was a Uruguayan musician, composer, and guitarist.

Founder of the Uruguayan group Los Iracundos, with his brother the composer, vocalist and arranger Eduardo Franco (1945–1989). The group formed in 1958 in Paysandu, Uruguay, under the name The Blue Kings, and had six members: Eduardo Franco (singer, composer, arranger), his brother Leonardo Franco (first guitar), Juan Carlos Velasquez (drums), Juan Bosco Zabalo (second guitar), Hugo María Burgeño (bass, vocals and composer) and Jesus Maria Febrero (keyboards). The group gave more than fifty years to music, having a style of romantic music and Latin pop. The band was famous for songs such as "Tú con él," "Apróntate para vivir," and "Te lo pido de rodillas".

Leonardo Franco was the father of musician and guitarist Adan Franco, who was in charge of the second guitar in front of the formation of Los Iracundos.

Franco died on 1 December 2015 at age 73 in Guatemala, where the group was preparing for a concert as part of his tour. The group reported in a press conference that a tour was planned in Guatemala and will continue with the three concerts that were scheduled.

== Discography ==
- Stop (1964)
- Sin palabras (1965)
- Con palabras (1965)
- El sonido de Los Iracundos (1965)
- Primeros en América (1966)
- En Estereofonía (1966)
- Los Iracundos en Roma (1967)
- La música de Los Iracundos (1967)
- La juventud (1968)
- Felicidad, felicidad (1968)
- Los Iracundos (1968)
- La lluvia terminó (1969)
- Los Iracundos para niños (1969)
- Los Iracundos (1969)
- Impactos (1970)
- Agua con amor (1971)
- Instrumental (1971)
- Lo mejor de Los Iracundos (1972)
- Te lo pido de rodillas (1973)
- Tango joven (1974)
- Y te has quedado sola (1974)
- Los Iracundos (1975)
- Los Iracundos (1976)
- Gol! (1977)
- Pasión y vida (1978)
- Amor y fe (1979)
- Incomparables (1980)
- Fue tormenta de verano (1981)
- 40 grados (1982)
- Los Iracundos (1983)
- Tú con él (1984)
- Iracundos 86 (1986)
- 20 Grandes 20 (1986)
- La Historia de Los Iracundos (1987)

== Filmography ==
- Una ventana al éxito (1966)
- Ritmo, amor y juventud (1966)
- El galleguito de la cara sucia (1966)
- Este loco verano (1970)
- Balada para un mochilero (1971)
- Locos por la música (1980)
