= Vic Andreetti =

English boxer

Victor Andreetti
Personal information
- Nationality: British
- Born: 29 January 1942 Hoxton, London, England
- Died: 21 February 2018 (aged 76) Loughton, Essex
- Weight: Light welterweight, lightweight

Boxing career

Boxing record
- Total fights: 67
- Wins: 51
- Win by KO: 19
- Losses: 13
- Draws: 3

Vic Andreetti (29 January 1942 – 21 February 2018) was a British former boxer who won the British junior welterweight title in 1969.

== Career ==
Born in Hoxton, London, Andreetti won ABA national schoolboy titles in 1955, 1956, and 1957, and won the junior class A championship at 140lbs in 1958. As an amateur he boxed for Shoreditch, Hackney, and Fitzroy Lodge.

He worked as a porter at Spitalfields Market, and turned professional at the age of 19, training under Danny Holland at the Thomas a' Beckett gym on the Old Kent Road. He made his professional debut in March 1961 with a points win over Colin Mannock. By late 1965 he had built up a record of 41 wins from 49 fights, two of his five losses coming at the hands of Maurice Cullen.

In November 1965 he challenged for Cullen's British lightweight title, losing on points at the Wolverhampton Civic Hall.

In July 1966 he beat Phil Lundgren to take the BBBofC Central Area lightweight title. In April 1967 he got a second shot at Cullen's British title, but again lost on points.

In February 1968 he faced Des Rea for the newly created British junior welterweight title, again losing on points. The two fought again for the title in February 1969, this time Andreetti taking the decision to become British champion. He defended the title successfully against Rea in October.

Andreetti had three further fights, losing the last two to Borge Krogh and Pedro Carrasco. He was ordered to defend his title against Cullen, but unhappy with the purse offered, chose to retire. The British junior welterweight title was subsequently dropped by the BBBofC before being resurrected in 1973 as the light welterweight title.

Andreetti relocated to Florida and went on to work as a boxing trainer, working with Nigel Benn among others. He returned to Britain in 2008 to help run the Boca Club in Loughton along with Jim McDonnell.
