= El Galleguito de la cara sucia =

- Directed by: Enrique Cahen Salaberry
- Release date: 1966
- Running time: 80 minute
- Country: Argentina
- Language: Spanish

El Galleguito de la cara sucia is a 1966 Argentine film.

== Cast ==
- Juan Ramón as Francisco "Paco" Ruiz Gonzaga
- Nora Cárpena as Laura Videla Osorio
- Elena Lucena as Madre de Laura
- Eddie Pequenino as Tío Pierre
- Mario Savino as Oficial de Justicia
- Joe Rígoli as Joaquín Regueiro
- Fabio Zerpa as José María
- Diego Varzi as Bebe
- Cholo Aguirre
- Los Iracundos
- Julia von Grolman as Mónica
- Chunchuna Villafañe as Karina
- Wagner Mautone as Gustavo
