= Rocío Carrasco =

Spanish media personality, television host, model, businesswoman, producer and actress

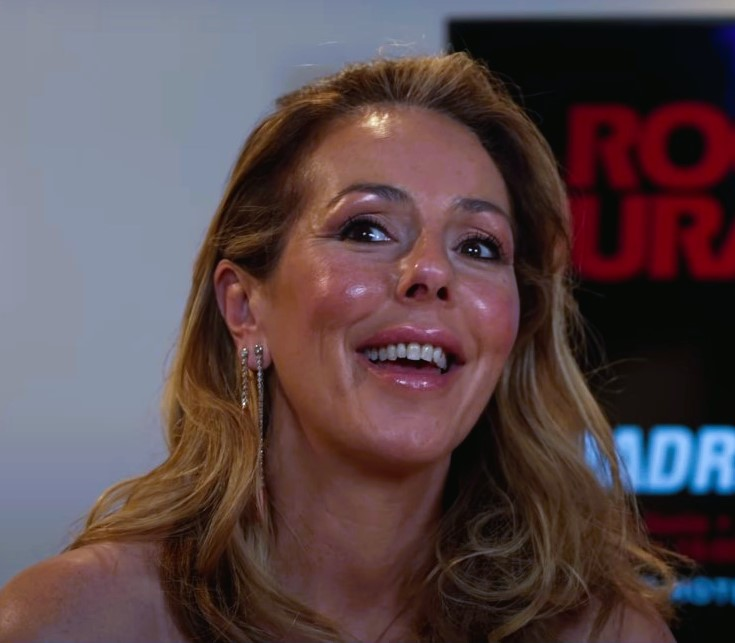
- Born: Rocío Carrasco Mohedano; April 29, 1977 (age 48); Madrid, Spain
- Other names: Rociíto
- Occupations: Media personality; television host; model; businesswoman; producer; actress
- Years active: 1993–present
- Spouses: Antonio David Flores (m. 1996; div. 1999); Fidel Albiac (m. 2016)
- Children: 2
- Parents: Pedro Carrasco (father); Rocío Jurado (mother)
- Relatives: María Teresa Campos

Rocío Carrasco Mohedano (born 29 April 1977) is a Spanish media personality, television host, model, businesswoman, producer and actress. Carrasco first gained media attention as a daughter of the Spanish world champion boxer Pedro Carrasco and singer Rocío Jurado. In 2021 she starred in her own docu-series in Telecinco entitled Rocío, contar la verdad para seguir viva where she talks about her life.
