= Rocío Jurado =

Spanish singer and actress (1943–2006)

The Most Excellent Rocío Jurado
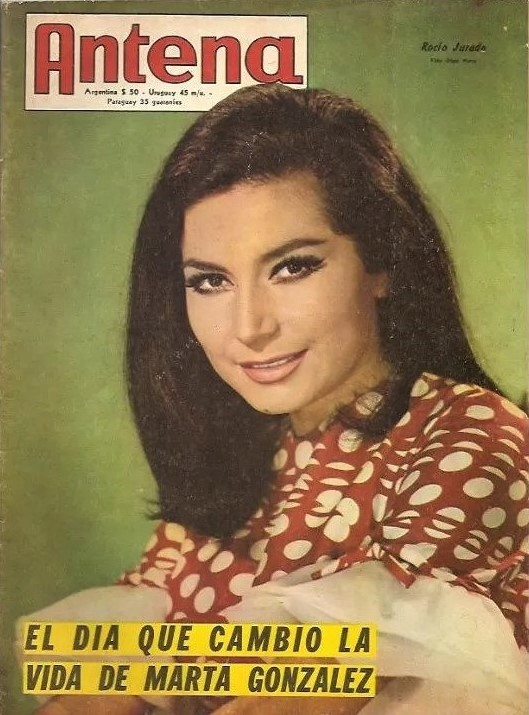
- On the front cover of a 1968 issue of Antena
- Born: María del Rocío Mohedano Jurado; 18 September 1943; Chipiona, Cádiz, Spanish State
- Died: 1 June 2006 (aged 62); Alcobendas, Madrid, Spain
- Other name: La más grande ("The Greatest")
- Occupations: Singer; actress; artist
- Years active: 1960–2006
- Spouses: Pedro Carrasco (m. 1976; div. 1989) José Ortega Cano (m. 1995)
- Musical career
- Genres: Copla; flamenco; Latin ballad
- Instrument: Vocals
- Award: See below

María del Rocío Mohedano Jurado (18 September 1943 (Note: Attributed to multiple references:) – 1 June 2006), simply known as Rocío Jurado (Spanish pronunciation: [roˈθi.o xuˈɾaðo]), was a Spanish singer and actress.

Nicknamed La más grande ("The Greatest"), Rocío Jurado sold more than 16 million records, making her one of the best-selling Spanish female singers. She received 5 platinum and 30 gold discs. (Note: Although some sources indicates she received 150 gold discs and 63 platinum discs.) In 2000, in New York City, she won the prize "La voz del Milenio" for best female voice of the 20th century.

== Childhood and youth ==
Rocío Jurado was born on Calvo Soto Street #11, Chipiona (Cádiz) in Andalusia, Spain. Her father, Fernando Mohedano Crespo (died at 36 years old), was a shoemaker and flamenco singer in his spare time; her mother, Rosario Jurado Bernal (died at 52 years old because of pancreatic cancer), was housewife and amateur performer of Andalusian traditional music. Rocío Jurado was the eldest of 3 children, Gloria (1950) and Amador (1953) and she had 3 nephews and 5 nieces.

At home, Rocío Jurado learned to love music; her first public performance was at the age of eight, in a play at Colegio La Divina Pastora. She learned to work hard when she was a girl, She sang in the church, and took part in some festivals organized by her school when she was fifteen. After her father's death, she helped with the precarious family finances. She worked as a shoemaker and as a fruit picker, and still had time to show up at Radio Sevilla contests. She came to be known as "The Girl of the Awards" after winning every radio station contest she entered. A friend of her mother introduced her to Manolo Caracol, her teacher.

Pastora Imperio immediately hired Rocío for the tablao (flamenco stage) she ran: El Duende, one of the first of the tablaos period. Being a minor, she had to wear clothes that made her appear older to avoid drawing the attention of the authorities.

Her workmate, the flamenco singer and dancer Cañeta de Málaga, who had also arrived in Madrid under age to seek her art and was hired in El Duende, recalls in an interview how the young Rocío sang "sus alegrías, sus tientos y sus cosas de la Piquer". Rocío had always said that she was born in 1944 because when she arrived in Madrid to sing in 1960 she was a minor. Until she was 16 she could not sing in the tablaos, so she falsified her date of birth, adding two more years by saying that she was born in 1944 instead of 1946.

== Artistic life ==
Professionally, Rocío Jurado emerged with a repertoire mostly of copla, an Andalusian traditional genre that was beginning to lose force which she revitalized with energetic performances, as much in voice as in stage presence.

Popular in the 60's and early 70's, due to appearances as an actress in television and film as in the Curro Jiménez series, Rocío made the leap to international stardom by adopting a melodic repertoire of romantic ballad with orchestral instruments and a personal image (make-up, hairdressing and costumes) in accordance with the European style.

Rocío alternated the flamenco tailed dress (bata de cola) with sumptuous evening dresses, sometimes highly commented on for their audacity. In the 70's and 80's Rocío recorded her most unmistakable successes: "Como una ola", "Señora", "Como yo te amo", "Ese hombre", "Se nos rompió el amor", "A que no te vas", "Muera el amor", "Vibro"... Many of them composed by Manuel Alejandro and recorded by José Antonio Álvarez Alija.

The prolonged celebrity of Rocío lies in the romantic songs rather than in its purely Andalusian folkloric facet. She was famous for these ballads also in Hispano-America, where she remained in fashion for longer than in Spain, which explains her later scores with Mexican and Caribbean rhythms: "Me ha dicho la luna", "Te cambio mi bulería"...She recorded duets with famous figures from that continent: with José Luis Rodríguez "El Puma" the song "Amigo amor" and with Ana Gabriel the ambiguous song "Amor silencio". In 1990 participated in a show of tribute to Lola Flores in Miami, in which she recorded the duet "Dejándonos la piel".

In 1982 she sang flamenco in a double LP with the collaboration of two main figures of this genre: the guitarist Manolo Sanlúcar and the singer Juan Peña "Lebrijano." Titled Ven & Sígueme, she discovered that the famous singer also moved with ease on the roads of Cante jondo. The filmmaker Carlos Saura used the voice of Rocío in two feature films: El amor brujo with Cristina Hoyos in 1986 and Sevillanas in 1992. In Sevillanas, plays alongside Paco de Lucía, Camarón de la Isla, Tomatito, Lola Flores, Manuela Carrasco, and Matilde Coral.

Rocío Jurado was one of the protagonists of Azabache, a musical based on Andalusian copla in which she took part with other artists specialized in this genre, such as Nati Mistral, Juanita Reina, Imperio Argentina and María Vidal. They released this spectacle during the Universal Exposition of Seville in 1992 (Expo '92).

In 1998, on the occasion of the Festival of Jerez de la Frontera dedicated to flamenco dancing, the Theatre Villamarta had to announce that they were sold out for the Rocío's gala weeks before the spectacle and before any other spectacles. An homage to the singer was made with the adaptation using "bulerías", a Flamenco variety of the song "Se nos rompió el amor" made by Fernando de Utrera. This song was originally composed by Manuel Alejandro but it was Rocío who had made it popular.

Rocío's voice was recognised internationally. She was awarded with the Best Female Voice of the 20th century in 2000. This award was conceded in 2000 in New York City by a group of journalists of the spectacle. In addition, in 1985, she sang for the President of the United States of America, Ronald Reagan in the White House. She was so popular that her death merited an article in the Billboard website. On 2 April 1988, Rocío received the award "América", which recognised the Best Latin Voice. The ceremony took place at the Caesars Palace Casino (Las Vegas). In 2011, the Spanish media group Antena 3 released a TV Movie (mini series) about Rocío's life titled Como alas al viento.

== Illness and death ==
In August 2004, she had a high-risk surgery at the Montepríncipe Hospital (Madrid). Later on 17 September, she would announce at a press conference that she had pancreatic cancer. In June 2005, the XIV "Festival de la Yerbabuena" was dedicated to her at Las Cabezas de San Juan, a village from Seville. She accepted with her childhood friend Juan Peña, "El Lebrijano," the award which was given to her father.

After more than a year of professional inactivity, Rocío re-appeared in December 2005, with a special programme in the Spanish Public Television (TVE) called Rocío, siempre, where she demonstrated her condition. The spectacle, which was filmed in two different sessions included an important part dedicated to the folkloric music and the other to her famous ballads and her other hits. She sang in duet some of the songs with the most famous Spanish singers: Raphael, Mónica Naranjo, Paulina Rubio, David Bisbal, Malú and others.

In January 2006, Rocío Jurado was hospitalized in the MD Anderson Hospital in Houston (Texas), for a check-up and to have a small surgery. An allergic reaction to one of the medicines provoked her hospitalization in the Intensive Care Unit (ICU) twice, which delayed her return to Spain until March 2006. The same day she returned to Spain, the government gave her an award for her work merits (Medalla al Mérito en el Trabajo), which was announced to her once she landed in Spain.

On 1 June 2006, at 4:15 am, Jurado died surrounded by her close relatives in her house in La Moraleja, an affluent residential area located in the municipality of Alcobendas, a northern suburb of Madrid. The cause of death was the pancreatic cancer she had been struggling with. Her brother and manager, Amador Mohedano Jurado, announced her death in front of the residence at 6 o’clock in the morning. Her body was transferred to the Centro Cultural de la Villa at Plaza de Colón in central Madrid, where the funeral chapel was visited by over 20,000 individuals. Finally, her body was transferred to Chipiona and buried at the local San José cemetery, where a mausoleum was built in her honour.

== Private life ==
Rocío was the first main Spanish celebrity to abandon the use of typical traditional clothes and replace them with clothes from great international high couturiers and stylists, although she never forgot her origins. On 21 May 1976, when she married Spanish boxer Pedro Carrasco at the Sanctuary Virgen de Regla, she wore a traditional costume with a comb and flounces. They only had one daughter, Rocío Carrasco Mohedano. In private, she sometimes recognized that she did not have time to dedicate to her daughter; she had long tours in Latin America and Europe which separated her from her daughter. After she was divorced in July 1989 and after obtaining the marriage annulment, Rocío married bullfighter José Ortega Cano on 17 February 1995 at her house in the country Dehesa Yerbabuena, in front of over 2300 guests. The ceremony was broadcast live (and prerecorded) on the main television channels on country. At the end of 1999, the couple adopted two Colombian children, José Fernando and Gloria Camila, who were presented in public in the Spanish magazine ¡Hola!.

== Honours ==
- Hija Predilecta of Chipiona (1968)
- Plaque Company De Castilla, breaking the box office record for both public attendance, as revenue at the Teatro Monumental in Madrid, with its series of "Rocío Jurado Brava" concerts (1986)
- ABC Gold Award (1987)
- Humanity Award, awarded by ASPACE (Spanish Confederation of Federations and Associations of Care for People with Cerebral Palsy and Allied; 1992)
- Gold Medal of Fine Arts from Don Juan Carlos I, King of Spain (1995)
- Ambassador of Cadiz (1996).
- Pimiento de Oro (Ciudad de Murcia; 1999)
- Honorary member of the American Forum of the Arts (July 2002 – death)
- Golden Star Press (2004)
- Gold Medal of Merit in Labour (Kingdom of Spain, 24 March 2006).
- Best Female Voice of the Twentieth Century – "The Voice of the Millennium Prize" (2000; New York)
- Hija Predilecta of the Province of Cádiz (1999)
- Gold Medal of Merit in Labour (2006)
- Hija Adoptiva of the Province of Seville (2007; posthumous)
- Ranked 38th of best 50 female Latin Pop artists of all time (2025)

== Awards ==
In Spain

- Flamenco Singing National Award (Jerez de la Frontera). She obtained this award at the age of 15.
- Al Andalus Trophy.
- Protagonist of the Year with Montserrat Caballé, in the Programme by Luis Del Olmo (1982).
- Radio Nacional de España (the Spanish National radio Channel) designated her as "The most popular Andalusian person of the Year", and "The best interpreter". This last recognition was due to the success of her song "Tengo miedo", which had the first places in the Spanish Hits for a couple of months.
- Lady España in 1967.^{10}
- "Parra de Oro" at the historic Festival of Moscatel (1968).
- En 1984, she was awarded the Gold Medal for the Touristic Merit.
- Andaluza Universal (1984).
- Gold Medal by Junta de Andalucía (1986).
- In 1986, she received a plaque (Placa Empresa De Castilla), for breaking the record for both attendance and revenue at the Monumental Theatre of Madrid, during her performances 'Rocío Jurado Brava'.

== Discography ==
- 1966 – Proceso a una estrella (Columbia)
- 1969 – Mi Amigo (Columbia)
- 1971 – Un Clavel (Columbia)
- 1973 – Soy de España (Columbia)
- 1975 – Rocío Interpreta a Alberto Bourbon (RCA)
- 1976 – A que no te vas (RCA)
- 1976 – No me des Guerra (Columbia)
- 1976 – Carmen de España (Columbia)
- 1976 – Fandangos de Isla Cristina (Flamenco) (Columbia)
- 1976 – Amor Marinero (RCA)
- 1978 – Don Golondón (Columbia)
- 1978 – De ahora en adelante (RCA)
- 1979 – Canta a México: Canta con Mariachi (RCA)
- 1979 – Por Derecho (RCA)
- 1979 – Señora (RCA)
- 1981 – Canciones de España (RCA)
- 1981 – Como una Ola (RCA)
- 1982 – Ven y Sígueme (RCA)
- 1983 – Canciones de España II: Y sin embargo te quiero (RCA)
- 1983 – Desde dentro (RCA)
- 1985 – Paloma Brava (EMI)
- 1986 – Suspiro de Amor (RCA)
- 1987 – ¿Dónde estás amor? (EMI)
- 1988 – Canciones de España Inéditas (EMI)
- 1989 – Punto de Partida (EMI)
- 1990 – Rocío de Luna Blanca (EMI)
- 1990 – Nueva Navidad (Sony)
- 1991 – Sevilla (Sony)
- 1993 – Como las alas al viento (Sony)
- 1993 – La Lola se va a los puertos B.S.O (Sony)
- 1994 – Palabra de honor (Sony)
- 1998 – Con mis cinco sentidos (Sony)
- 2001 – La más grande: Con la Orquesta Sinfónica de Bratislava (Bat Records)
- 2003 – Yerbabuena y Nopal (Sum Records)
- 2006 – Rocío Siempre (Sony-BMG)
- 2013 – Romances

== Billboard charts ==
https://www.billboard.com/artist/rocio-jurado/chart-history/htl/

- Vibro (#8)
- Amor de Noche (#10)
- ¿Quién Te Crees Tú? (#14)
- Amor Callado (#20)
- Amigo Amor (#24)
- Esta Noche Gano Yo (#28)
- ¿Dónde Estás Amor? (#43)
- Paloma Brava (#45)

== Filmography ==
- La Lola se va a los puertos (1993)
- Sevillanas (1992)
- El amor brujo (1986)
- La querida (1976)
- Rocío y los detonadores (TV film, 1972)
- Una chica casi decente (1971)
- Lola la piconera (TV film, 1969)
- En Andalucía nació el amor (1966)
- Proceso a una estrella (1966)
- Los Guerrilleros (1963)

== See also ==
- List of best-selling Latin music artists
