= Alberto Migré =

Argentine writer (1931–2006)

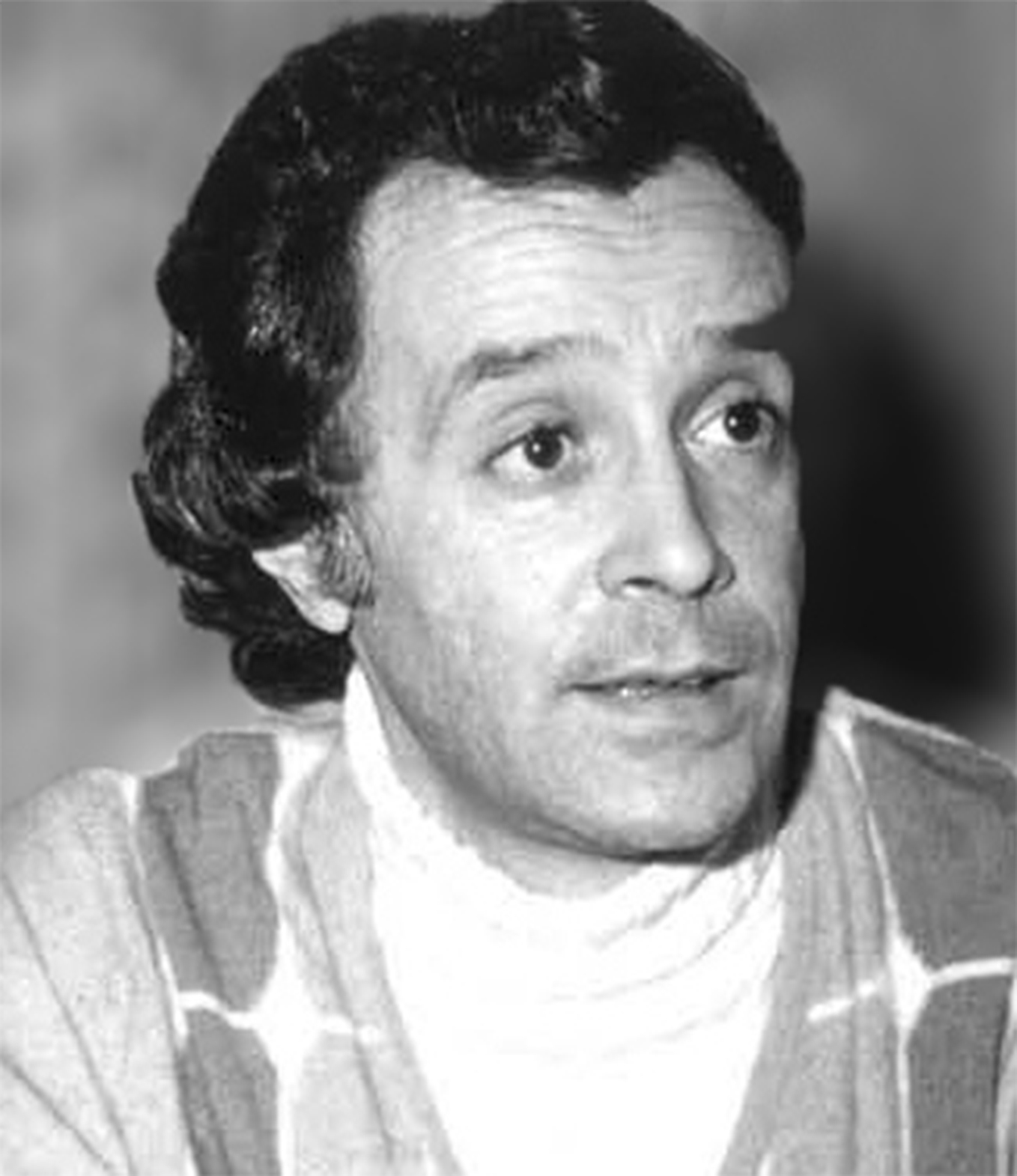
Alberto Migré

Felipe Alberto Milletari Miagro (12 September 1931 – 10 March 2006), better known as Alberto Migré, was an Argentine TV screenwriter and producer, who specialized in telenovelas.

== Family background ==
Alberto was born in the barrio of Almagro, the son of Piedmontese immigrants.

== TV career ==
He was in charge of sound in a radionovela starring Chela Ruiz and Horacio Delfino. He wrote Revista juvenil argentina (1948).

Starting in 1972 Migré created television shows including Rolando Rivas, taxista, Piel Naranja and Pobre diabla. In 1974 he wrote the script for the cinema version of Rolando Rivas, taxista. In its plots, it included topics that were not common on Argentine TV, such as guerrilla warfare and political violence in the 1970s.

Migré never married, and lived with his parents until their death. He died in his sleep of a heart attack at the age of 75.

== Filmography ==
=== Television work ===
- Piel Naranja...años después (2004) actors: Arnaldo André and Leonor Benedetto.
- Pobre diabla (2000) actors: Angie Cepeda, Salvador del Solar and Arnaldo André
- Louca Paixão (1999)
- El Rafa (1997)
- Alguna vez tendremos alas (1997)
- Antônio Alves, Taxista (1996)
- Son cosas de novela (1996) (writer and producer)
- Leandro Leiva, un soñador (1995) actors: Miguel Ángel Solá, China Zorrilla and Carlos Estrada
- Inconquistable corazón (1994) co-author Victor Agú. acting: Paola Krum and Pablo Rago.
- Esos que dicen amarse (1993) main actors: Carolina Papaleo, Raúl Taibo
- Fiesta y bronca de ser joven (1992) acting Laura Novoa
- Pobre diabla (1972) with Soledad Silveyra, second production in (1990) main actors: Jeannette Rodriguez, Osvaldo Laport
- Una voz en el teléfono (1990) main actors: Carolina Papaleo, Raúl Taibo
- No va más... la vida nos separa (1988) (writer and producer) acting: Nora Carpena, Juan Carlos Dual
- Sin marido (1988) acting: Patricia Palmer, Gustavo Garzón
- Ella contra mí (1988) acting: Gustavo Garzón, Carolina Papaleo - Gustavo Garzón, Liliana Weimer
- La cuñada (1987) acting: Maria del Carmen Valenzuela, Daniel Fanego.
- Cuando vuelvas a mí (1986) acting: Arturo Puig, Ana María Cores, Mariana Karr
- El hombre que amo (1986) acting: Germán Krauss, Silvia Kutika, Stella Maris Closas
- Amor prohibido (1986) versión libre de Maestro & Vainmann. acting: Verónica Castro, Jean Carlos Simancas.
- Tal como somos (1984) (escritor y productor)
- Sola (1983) acting: Zulma Faiad, Francisco Llanos.
- Un hombre como vos (1982) acting: Claudio Garcia Satur.
- Celos (1982) Chilean version of "Piel Naranja"
- Chau, amor mío (1979) acting: Soledad Silveyra, Arnaldo André
- Vos y yo, toda la vida (1978) acting: Maria del Carmen Valenzuela, Arturo Puig
- El tema es el amor (1977) (writer and producer)
- Pablo en nuestra piel (1977) acting: Maria del Carmen Valenzuela, Arturo Puig
- Los que estamos solos (1976) acting: Nora Cárpena, Arnaldo André
- Dos a quererse (1976) acting: Thelma Biral, Claudio Garcia Satur
- Piel naranja (1975) acting: Arnaldo André, Marilina Ross, China Zorrilla
- Mi hombre sin noche (1974) acting: Soledad Silveyra, Arnaldo André
- Pobre diabla (1972) acting: Soledad Silveyra, Arnaldo André, China Zorrilla
- Rolando Rivas, taxista (1972) acting: Claudio García Satur, Soledad Silveyra - Claudio García Satur, Nora Cárpena
- Un extraño en nuestras vidas (1972) (writer and producer)
- Nacido para odiarte (1971) acting: Silvina Rada
- El adorable profesor Aldao (1971) acting: Alberto Martin, Beatriz Taibo
- Mis tres amores (1971)
- Esta noche... miedo (1970)
- Inconquistable Viviana Ortiguera (1970)
- El hombre que me negaron (1970) (writer and producer)
- Trampa para un play boy (1969) (writer and producer)
- Cuando vuelvas a mí (1969) (writer and producer)
- Adorable profesor Aldao (1968) (writer and producer)
- La pulpera de Santa Lucía (1968)
- Mujeres en presidio (1967) (writer and producer)
- Lo mejor de nuestra vida... nuestros hijos (1967) (writer and producer)
- Su comedia favorita (1965) (writer and producer)
- O Pintor e a Florista (1964)
- É Proibido Amar (1964)
- El hogar que nos negamos (1964)
- Acacia Montero (1964) (writer and producer)
- Tu triste mentira de amor (1964)
- 2-5499 Ocupado (1963)
- Dos a quererse (1963)
- Altanera Evangelina Garret (1962)
- Silvia muere mañana (1962)
- Amelia no vendrá (1962)
- Aquí a las seis (1962)
- El 0597 está ocupado (1956)
- 0597 da ocupado (1950)

=== Cine ===
- Rolando Rivas, taxista (1974) (writer and producer)
- Ese que siempre esta solo (1964) (writer and producer)
