= Guillermo Bredeston =

Argentinian actor (1933–2018)

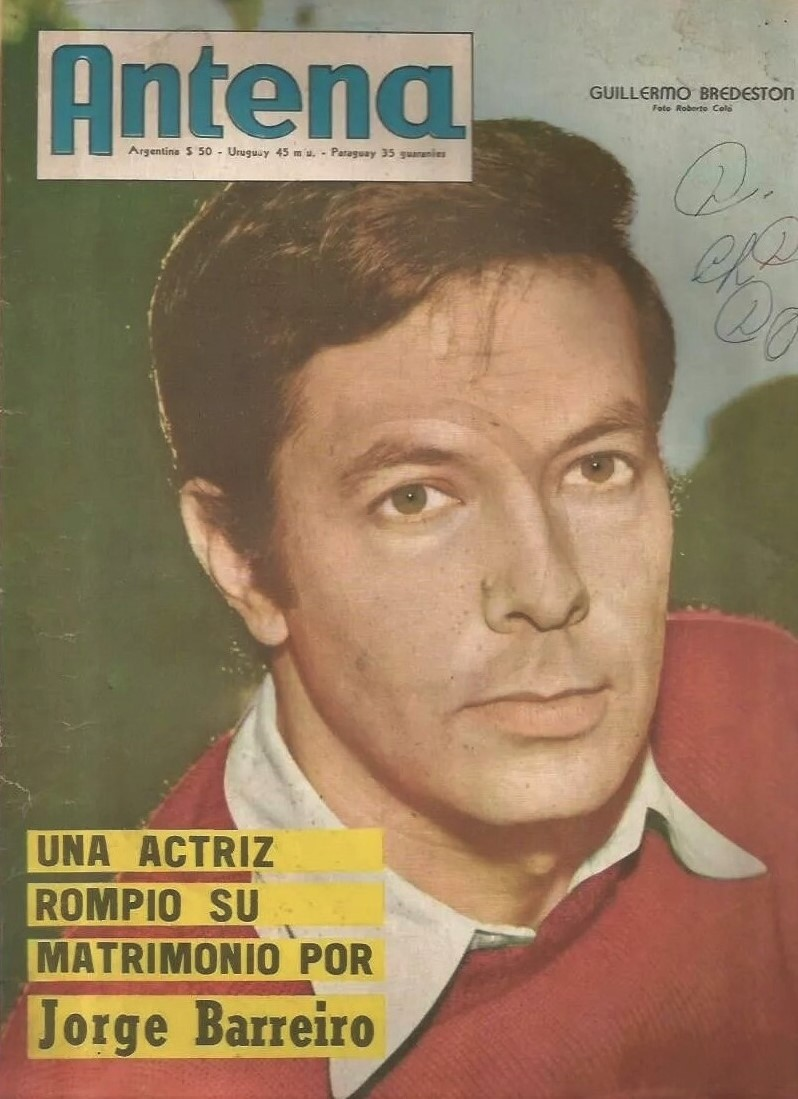
- Guillermo Bredeston (1968)
- Born: Guillermo Juan Bredenston; 24 August 1933; Concepción del Uruguay, Argentina
- Died: 28 July 2018 (aged 84); Buenos Aires, Argentina
- Occupation: Actor
- Years active: 1958—2018
- Spouse: Nora Cárpena

Guillermo Juan Bredeston (24 August 1933 – 28 July 2018) was an Argentine stage, television and film actor. He was married to actress Nora Cárpena.

== Selected filmography ==
- Pobres habrá siempre (1958)
- The Dragonfly Is Not an Insect (1963)
- Deliciously Amoral (1969)

== Bibliography ==
- Andrew A. Aros. An actor guide to the talkies, 1965 through 1974. Scarecrow Press, 1977.
