= Arantxa del Sol =

Spanish model, TV presenter and actress (born 1972)

- Born: María Arántzazu Maciñeiras de Lucas; 20 May 1972 (age 54); Cangas de Onís, Asturias, Spain
- Occupations: Model; TV presenter; actress
- Years active: 1991-
- Employer: Telecinco
- Spouse: Finito de Córdoba (m. 2001)
- Children: 2

María Arántzazu Maciñeiras de Lucas (Cangas de Onís, Asturias, 20 May 1972), better known by her stage name Arantxa del Sol, is a Spanish model, actress, and television presenter.

== Biography ==
She studied humanities at the University of Alcalá de Henares. Chosen as Miss Madrid in 1989, she began her career as a model. Her first contacts with the world of entertainment were through television, when in 1991 she was a hostess on the show El precio justo, Spanish adaptation of The Price Is Right and during 1991–1992 season she was signed by private channel Telecinco to co-host, alongside Andoni Ferreño, the couples' game show Vivan los novios. She also hosted the 1996 TV musical special La chica de la primavera, alongside Àlex Casanovas, and in which multiple Spanish voices and personalities appeared, such as Laura Valenzuela, Cayetana Guillén Cuervo and Amistades Peligrosas' Alberto Comesaña.

Linked during that time with the mentioned TV channel, in the following seasons she would present various variety shows and contests very much in the style of Telecinco's early years, such as Humor cinco estrellas (1992), VIP Noche (autumn of 1992), or La batalla de las estrellas (1993–1994), becoming one of the most popular faces of the network.

Her acting career began with the film Aquí, el que no corre...vuela (1992), followed by Pelotazo Nacional (1993), by Mariano Ozores. She has also participated in the series Esencia de poder (2001) and El pasado es mañana (2005), both on Telecinco.

In 2010, she appeared in the production of the play Brujas, by Santiago Moncada, directed by Manuel Galiana. Later, in 2011, she made a cameo in the supernatural drama series Ángel o demonio.

She married the bullfighter Finito de Córdoba on October 20, 2001, in the church of Santa Marina de Aguas Santas, and they have a daughter, Lucía, born in 2002, and a son, Juan Rodrigo, born in 2008.

After several years without appearing on television, in February 2024, she signed as an official contestant for Supervivientes 2024 on Telecinco.
