= Corazones de fuego =

- Genre: Anthology drama
- Written by: Bertha Sarmiento de Betancourt, Luis Felipe Salamanca & Dago García, Alpha Dolly Delgado
- Directed by: Ernesto Franco Gómez; Fabio Camero
- Theme music composer: W. F. Abrahams
- Country of origin: Colombia
- Original language: Spanish
- No. of seasons: 3
- No. of episodes: 200+

Production
- Producer: Mercy Merchán Zárate
- Running time: 30 min with commercials
- Production company: Tevecine

Original release
- Network: Cadena Uno
- Release: 1992 – 1994

Corazones de fuego ("Hearts of Fire") is a Colombian television anthology drama series, broadcast three times a week on daytime between 1992 and 1994 on the state-owned channel Cadena Uno. It was produced by Producciones Tevecine.

All episodes were self-conclusive, and many dealt, besides the typical melodrama topics, with the mysterious and supernatural, particularly in the 1992 season.

== Re-runs ==
In 2016, reruns of Corazones de fuego air in the early mornings on Canal Uno.
