= Rolando Rivas, taxista =

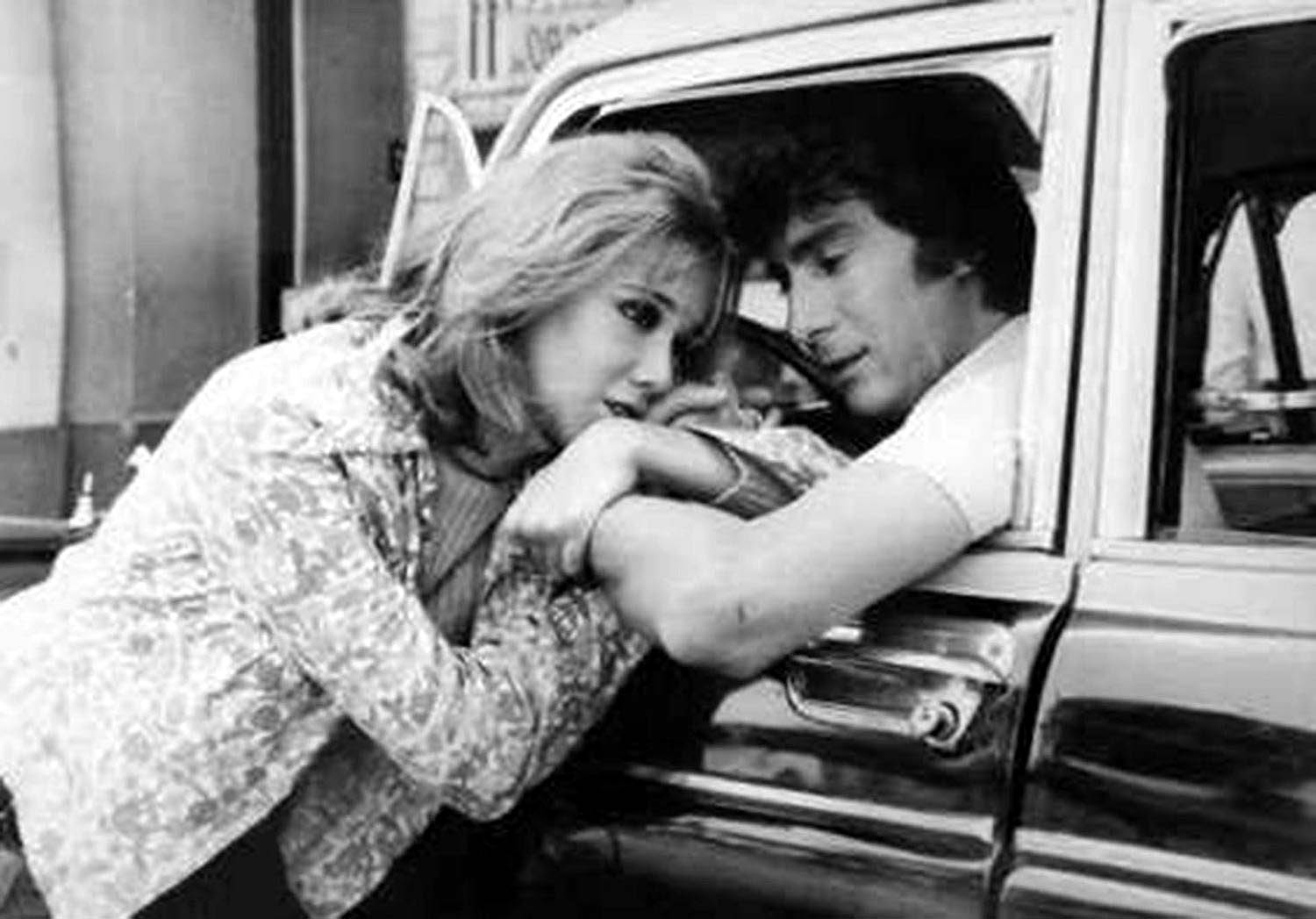
- Promotional photo of the TV series, 1972
- Directed by: Julio Saraceni
- Written by: Alberto Migré
- Screenplay by: Rodolfo Manuel Taboada and Roberto Tálice
- Produced by: Carlos García Nacson and Luis Giudici
- Cinematography: Américo Hoss
- Edited by: Rosalino Caterbeti
- Music by: Alain Debray
- Release date: 10 October 1974
- Running time: 90 minutes
- Country: Argentina
- Language: Spanish

Rolando Rivas, taxista is a 1972-3 Argentine telenovela and a 1974 romantic drama film directed by Julio Saraceni and starring Claudio García Satur and Soledad Silveyra. It was created by Alberto Migré.

== Film cast ==
- Claudio García Satur as Rolando Rivas
- Soledad Silveyra as Mónica Helguera Paz
- Nora Cárpena as Natalia Riglos Arana
- Marcelo Marcote as Quique
- Beba Bidart
- Antonio Grimau
- Pablo Codevila as Juanjo
- Adriana Aguirre
- Mabel Landó as Teresa
- Héctor Biuchet
- Laura Bove
- Héctor Gance
