= Jorge Gatto =

- Origin: Uruguay
- Years active: 1968-present
- Member of: El Show de los Iracundos
- Formerly of: Los Iracundos, Frutilla

Jorge Gatto is a Uruguayan musician and a former member of Los Iracundos.

His music career began in the year of 1968.

Before being a member of Los Iracundos he was a member of the band Frutilla.

Jorge Gatto would join Los Iracundos in September 1988 when on several occasions Eduardo Franco could not sing due to his illness. Shortly after Eduardo's death Jorge became the lead singer of Los Iracundos.

Gatto would debut in Lima with Los Iracundos in the year of 1991 which went successful.

He would go on to sing the Los Iracundos version of Con la Misma Moneda in 1993, which would prove to be a moderate success.

In October 2006 he left the group for his own career and would create a song called Loco amor de verano which was inspired by Eduardo Franco, he then created El Show de Los Iracundos which he is currently part of.

The song Loco amor de verano (Crazy Summer Love) was released in 2011.
