= Los Iracundos =

Uruguayan rock and roll band

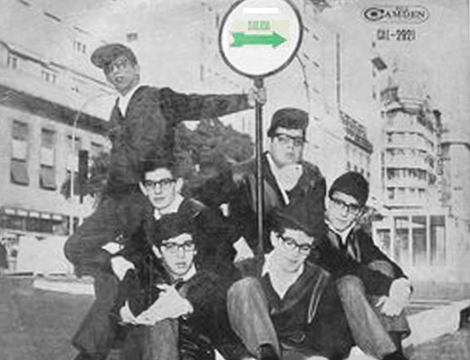

Background information
- Origin: Paysandú
- Genres: Nueva ola, rock and roll
- Years active: 1958-present
- Members: Lucas Burgueño, Ángela Burgueño, Pablo Baronio or Manuel Paz (Vocals), Richard La Nasa , Diego Insua and Andres Archundia.
- Past members: Eduardo Franco (singer) Leoni Franco Jorge Julio Gatto Bell Juan Bosco Zabalo Jesús María Febrero Juan Carlos Velazquez Hugo Burgueño
- Website: Los Iracundos

Los Iracundos are a popular Uruguayan band from the city of Paysandú, active since the 1960s. Their music can be classified as rock and roll, including many ballads.

== History ==
The Group was formed in 1958 in Paysandú, Uruguay and was originally formed by six musicians who called themselves "Los Blue Kings".

The original band members were Eduardo Franco (vocals and composer), his brother Leonardo Franco (lead guitar), Juan Carlos Velázquez (drums), Juan Bosco Zabalo (rhythm guitar), Hugo Burgueño (bass guitar), and Jesús María Febrero (keyboards). The band actually commenced in 1961.

=== 1960s ===
Los Iracundos reached international fame with early songs like "Calla", "Todo terminó", "El desengaño", "La lluvia terminó", "Felicidad", "Tu ya no estarás", "Es la lluvia que cae", and "El triunfador." Most of these songs were included on their album "Iracundos en Roma", their most successful album and the one which even took them to the big screen in films like "Este loco verano".

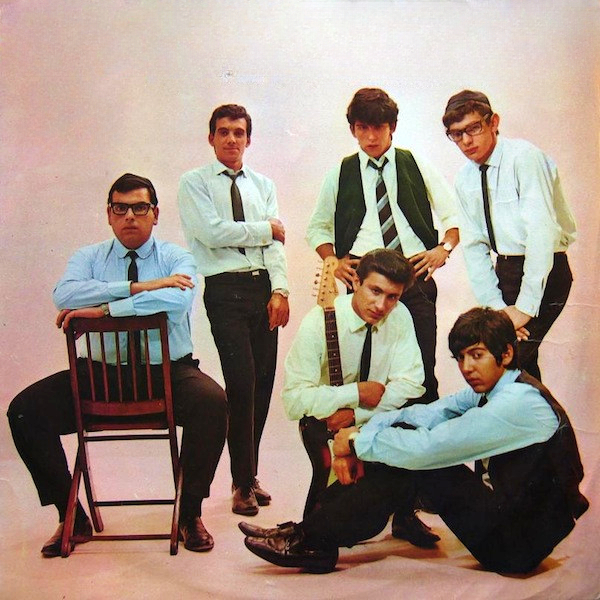
The band in 1966

Los Iracundos debuted on stage on October 10, 1961, at the historic Florencio Sánchez Theatre. In less than two years, they recorded their first album with the record "Clave", which included the songs "Reten la noche" and "Madison", as well the songs "A Saint Tropez" and "Despierta Lorenzo."

Their most successful and most recognizable song from this decade was "Puerto Montt", written by Eduardo Franco and Cacho Valdez. It was recorded on October 16, 1968, at the RCA Studios in Argentina and was played live for the first time at the Buenos Aires Festival de la Canción on November 11, 1968. In 1969 the radio station Cine Radio Actualidad TV described the band as "six honest Uruguayan millionaires" and ended up gaining diplomatic passport.

=== 1970s ===
In 1970 the band would tour Peru twice and would also perform on Lima television in the year, they also had many fans in Peru and had already become a hit there.

During the 1970s, Los Iracundos cemented their popularity with many other recognizable songs such as "Te lo pido de rodillas," "Y te has quedado sola," "Chiquilina," "Soy un Mamarracho," "Rio Verde," "Tu me diste amor, tu me diste fe," "Cada noche mia," "Me estas matando," and "Y me quede en el bar." In 1972, the band performed at the Viña del Mar festival in Chile in one of their most successful performances. They also went on tours to Spain, Italy, and France during the 1970s.

Every year they released an album, in some cases even two, as the band decided to compose their own songs with a more original style. In that decade, they released a total of six albums with songs such as the instrumental "Tango joven" and "Él Ultimo Café", written and sung by Eduardo Franco. They did also release EPs, mini plays and 45s singles, such as "Por eso, estoy preso." In this period, most of the songwriting was thanks to the creative input of Eduardo Franco, Hugo Burgueño, Leonardo Franco and Juan Carlos Velázquez, resulting in songs such as "Y me quedé en el bar", "Cada noche mía" "Como pretendes que te quiera", and "Fue una fábula".

== 1980s ==
At the beginning of the 80s, the band appeared in the Argentine film "Locos por la música" along with other musicians like Boney M, singing the song from their 1979 LP "Tu me diste amor, tu me diste fe", "Esa esquina". 1981 brought success with the LP "Tormenta de verano". In 1982 their song "40 Grados" was also recorded in Portuguese; they also re-released the 1978 song "Pasión y vida" and the 1979 song "Tu me diste amor, tu me diste fe" for the Portuguese-language market.

1983 brought more success with the album "Los Iracundos", also named "Aprontate a vivir". In 1984, they released the album "Tú con él", with most of the songs composed mainly by Eduardo Franco. They enjoyed another hit with the song "Las puertas del olvido", a hit in United States and also in many Latin American countries.

1985 saw the end of their relationship with the record company RCA Victor, with whom they had been signed since the early 60s. The last album for the company was a compilation called "20 Grandes éxitos" with five new songs. In March of that year, on the advice and with the organization of bass player Hugo Burgueño, they visited Bolivia, also playing at the Calama Song Festival in Chile.

In 1986, now with the record company Microfonon Argentina, they released "Iracundos 86" after successful tours, with songs like "Me voy o me quedo" and "Pedazo de papel". They also released the compilation "Historia de los Iracundos". Because of personal problems, Burgueño failed to participate in the subsequent tour of the United States, afterward leaving the band.

The following year, saw the last album they released with lead singer, Eduardo Franco and the first one without Burgueño, entitled "Eduardo Franco y sus Iracundos". The album contained songs that were modest successes in Latin America, such as "Por que me hiciste trampa" and "Dime quíen".

On April, 3rd, 1988, the band made their last appearance with Franco, in their native Paysandú, at the Beer Festival, in Spanish "El Festival de la Cerveza".

On February 1, 1989, Franco died of Hodgkins' Lymphoma at the age of 45 at his home in Paysandú.

== 1990s ==
After, Franco's death, the rest of the band members, except Burgueño, released a new album with songs composed mainly by Franco called "Iracundos 1990". In 1992, keyboardist Jesús Febrero left the group and in November of the same year, rhythm guitar player, Juan Bosco Zabalo died from heart problems at the Concepción de Uruguay Hospital. Before his death, he was living in Entre Ríos, Argentina.

By 1994, the group was reduced just to Eduardo Franco's brother Leonardo and Juan Carlos Velázquez, so they hired Jorge Gatto as their new lead singer. They released a new album with songs again composed mainly by Eduardo Franco, providing the modest hit "Con la misma moneda", which helped to revive their careers. They represented Uruguay at the OTI Festival 1996 held in Quito, with the song "Quiero estrenar el amor contigo" composed by Eduardo Franco, which proved to be a minor success.

In 1997, record company BMG-Argentina digitally re-released the band's original studio albums from 1963 to 1987, with the approval of Hugo Burgueño who had the rights of the band's name.

In 1999, the band released which prove to be their last album to date, a remake of many of their classical hits, with the vocals of Gatto. From that point, the band decided to focus exclusively on live performances mainly in Latin America and some parts of Europe.

== 2000s ==
Jesús Febrero, the band's original keyboardist, who later left the group to tour with his band, Los Iracundos de Febro. He died at his home on August 2, 2003. Four years later, in 2007, Leonardo decided to join Febro's band, with drummer Velázquez, the only member of the original line up. He decided to tour in his own, as well Hugo Burgueño, who toured with his son, Lucas, who sang and wrote material as well for an album, Seguimos Cantando, along with his father. As well other material like "Disco Azul" and "Según pasen los años" which consisted of covers of other artists.

On December 1, 2015, on a tour on Guatemala with Los Iracundos de Febro, Leonardo died from a cardiac arrest.

On September 19, 2019 the band released a video for their 60 year aniverasry, it featured covers of their albums and photos of Burgues and his son Lukas along with some other photos of the group. In 2026 a day for former lead singer Eduardo Franco was proposed under the name of "Día de la Música Romántica" which would take place on March 15 which was his birthday.

== Members ==
Juan Carlos Velazquez still tours to this date with a hired band, using the name "Los Iracundos". Members consist of Manuel Paz (Vocals), Richard La Nasa (Guitar), Diego Insua (Keyboard) and Andres Archundia (Bass). Other members included

- Eduardo Franco
- Leonardo Franco
- Jorge Julio Gatto Bell (replaced Eduardo Franco)
- Juan Bosco Zabalo
- Jesús María Febrero
- Juan Carlos Velazquez
- Hugo Burgueño (last surviving member of original band)

== Discography ==
This is a list of discography by the band

- Stop (1964)
- Calla (1965)
- Buscandote (1966)
- Los Iracundos en Roma (1967)
- Felicidad, Felicidad (1968)
- Puertto Mont (1968)
- La Lluvia Termino (1969)
- Israel (1968-1969)
- Y te has quedado sola (1974)
- Los Iracundos (1976)
- Los Iracundos (1977)
- Gol! de Los Iracundos (1977)
- Pasion Y Vida (1978, sometimes mistakenly cited as 2001)
- 40 grados (1982)
- Apronte A Vivr (1983)
- Ay Me Duele (1983, sometimes mistakenly cited as 2004)
- Tu Con El (1984)
- Iracundos 86 (1986)
- 20 Grandes 20 (1986)
- La Historia de Los Iracundos (1987)
- Con la misma moneda (1993)
- Vivo La Vida (2004)
- Poemas de Luna (2010s-2020s, often cited as 2024)
- Sabor A Cumbia Parte 1 (2025)

After 1999 the discography of the officially recognized band ends, after that it is Hugo Burgueño's faction of the band who would create new discography

== Knockoffs ==
There are also several knockoffs of Los Iracundos pretending to be the band, the band themselves left their email to prevent fans from falling into these scams, which included people that were never part of the band or related to anyone in it.
