= Eduardo Franco (singer) =

Uruguayan singer and composer

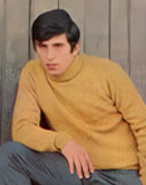

Background information
- Born: Eduardo Franco Zannier; March 15, 1945; Paysandú
- Died: February 1 1989 (Aged 43) Pasayandu
- Years active: 1958-1989
- Formerly of: Los Iracundos

Eduardo Franco Zannier (15 March 1945 – 1 February 1989) was a singer and Uruguayan composer who gained international fame as the vocalist of the melodic group Los Iracundos.

== Biography ==
=== Early life ===
Eduardo Franco was born in Paysandú on March 15, 1945 in the home of his maternal grandparents. He lived with his brother Leonardo Franco. They often visited the Santa Cecilia ranch, a large property owned by his Grandparents, which is where he developed his talent in singing and at the age of 8 years old, he climbed onto a cart and used a broom and would pretend it was a microphone. Initially his primary education was at school No.8 and then to the Liceo Nuestra Señora del Rosario school.

=== Eduardo Franco in Los Iracundos ===
With Los Iracundos, Franco rose to international acclaim around the mid 60s, with juvenile romantic subjects such as «Calla», «Todo erminó», «El desengaño», «La lluvia terminó», «Felicidad, felicidad», «El triunfador», «Puerto Montt» and «Es la lluvia que cae»; included subject in the album Los Iracundos en Roma-the most successful of this decade- successes that carry them to incursionar, even, in the cinema, in several opportunities like invited and in one of them like protagonists, in the film Este loco verano where besides interpreted the songs of his repertoire and Locos por la musica.

=== Death ===
His cancer was diagnosed in the early 1980s.

When he learned his death was soon he would appoint Jorge Gatto to replace him as the lead singer as his health was already in a decline during the 1980s on domestic and international tours.

On 1 February 1989, Eduardo Franco died of a terminal cancer to the lymphatic ganglions in his hometown, after several years of enduring in front of his demanded profession; leaving like successor to Jorge Julio Gatto Bell.

== Discography ==
Here it finds the discography that recorded with his grouping:

- 1963: Stop
- 1964: Sin palabras
- 1964: Con palabras
- 1965: Primeros en América
- 1966: El Sonido de Los Iracundos
- 1966: Los Iracundos en Roma
- 1967: La juventud
- 1967: En Estereofonía
- 1967 : Felicidad, Felicidad
- 1968: Puerto Montt
- 1969: La lluvia terminó
- 1969: La Música de Los Iracundos
- 1970: Los Iracundos
- 1971: Impactos
- 1971: Instrumental
- 1972: Agua con amor
- 1973: Te lo pido de rodillas
- 1974: Tango joven
- 1974: Y te has quedado sola
- 1975: Cada noche mía
- 1976: Cómo pretendes que te quiera
- 1977: Gol! de Los Iracundos
- 1978: Pasión y vida
- 1979: Amor y fe
- 1980: Incomparables
- 1981: Fue tormenta de verano
- 1982: 40 grados
- 1983: Apróntate a vivir
- 1984: Tú con él
- 1985: Iracundos '86
- 1986: 20 Grandes 20
- 1987: La Historia de Los iracundos

== Tributes ==
- In 2022 a bust of Eduaro Franco was created.
- Several documentaries of Eduaro have also been made
