= Nora Cárpena =

Argentine actress

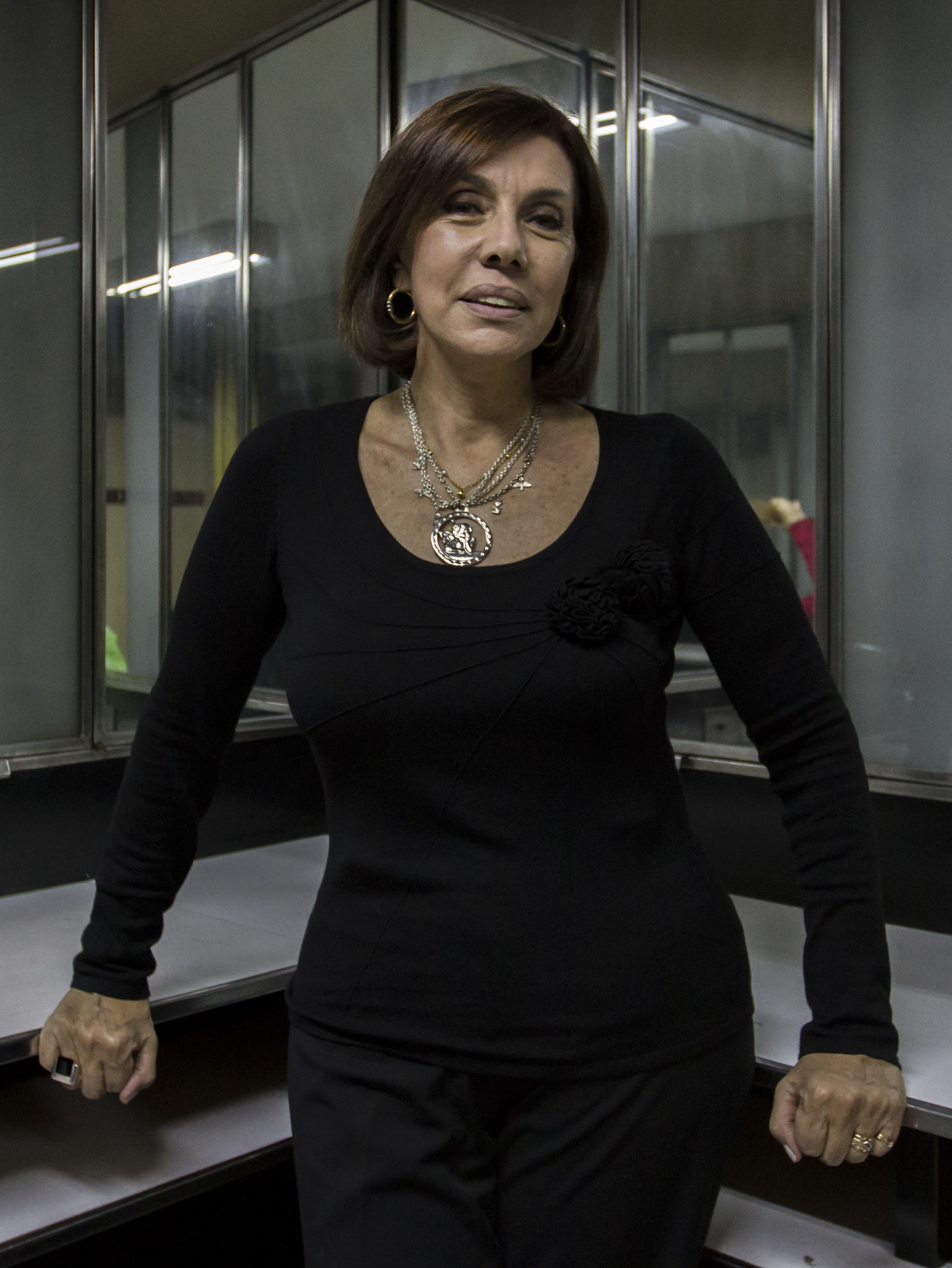
Nora Cárpena in 2016.

Nora Haydée Cárpena (born 23 January 1945 in Quilmes) is an Argentine film, theatre and television actress, notable for her roles in telenovelas. She was married to actor Guillermo Bredeston.

== Television ==
- 1972: Rolando Rivas, taxista as Natalia Riglos Arana.
- 2004: Padre Coraje as Elisa Guerrico.
- 2006: Montecristo as Mercedes Cortés.
- 2013: Esa mujer as Victoria Acevedo.
- 2014: Somos familia as Beatriz Blasco.
- 2017: Divina, está en tu corazón as Irene.

== Theatre ==
- 1967: Los dias felices with Guillermo Bredeston, Fernanda Mistral, Jorge Barreiro, Cristina del Valle and Norberto Suárez.
- 1977-1978: Ensalada de ternura y tomate.
- 1974-1975: Una rosa para el desayuno with Guillermo Bredeston.
- 1987: Chispas with Thelma Biral.
- 1991-1997, 2000-2001, 2010-2011, 2021-2024: Brujas with Moria Casán, Thelma Biral, Graciela Dufau, and Susana Campos. Inbetween also: 2010-2011 Leonor Benedetto replacing Susana Campos, and 2021-2024 María Leal and Sandra Mihanovich replacing Campos and Dufau.
- 2014-2016: Mujeres de ceniza with Adriana Salgueiro, Zulma Faiad and Mercedes Carreras.
- 2017: Dios existe, acabo de conocerlo with Mercedes Carreras.
- 2019: Viva la vida, el musical un tributo a los jóvenes de ayer with Rodolfo Ranni, Alberto Martín, Marta Bianchi, Mercedes Carreras and Jorge Martinez.
- 2020: Mentiras inteligentes with Arnaldo André, Federico Bal and Micaela Vázquez.
- 2025: Vuida e hijas with María Valenzuela, María Fernanda Callejón, Sofía Gala Castiglione and Gonzalo Urtizberea, Teatro Multitabaris Comafi.

== Filmography ==
- 1964: Il Gaucho as Lida.
- 1965: Spring Fever.
- 1966: El Galleguito de la cara sucia as Laura Videla Osorio.
- 1969: The Boys Didn't Wear Hair Gel Before as Camila.

== Awards ==
- 2006: Martín Fierro Award for Best Special Guest Star in Montecristo.
