= Finito de Córdoba =

Spanish torero (born 1971)

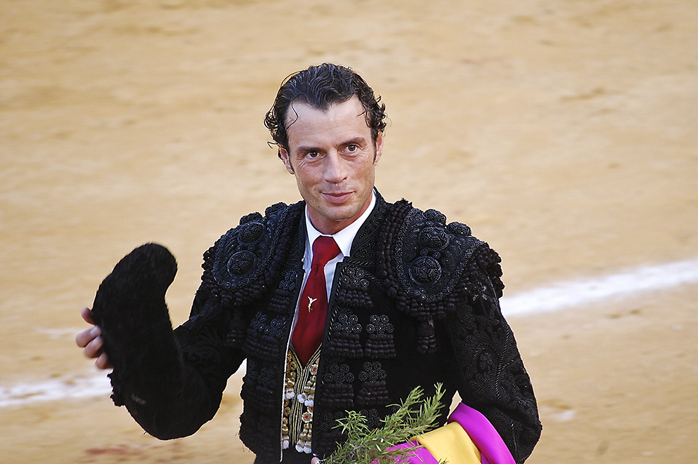
- Finito de Córdoba in 2010.
- Born: Juan Serrano Pineda; 6 October 1971 (age 53); Sabadell, Spain
- Occupation: Bullfighter
- Years active: 27 June 1987, Santiponce
- Spouse(s): Arantxa del Sol (2001-present)
- Children: 2

Juan Serrano Pineda, better known as Finito de Córdoba, (born 6 October 1971) is a Spanish bullfighter. He has exited through Las Ventas' Puerta Grande on one occasion.

== Biography ==
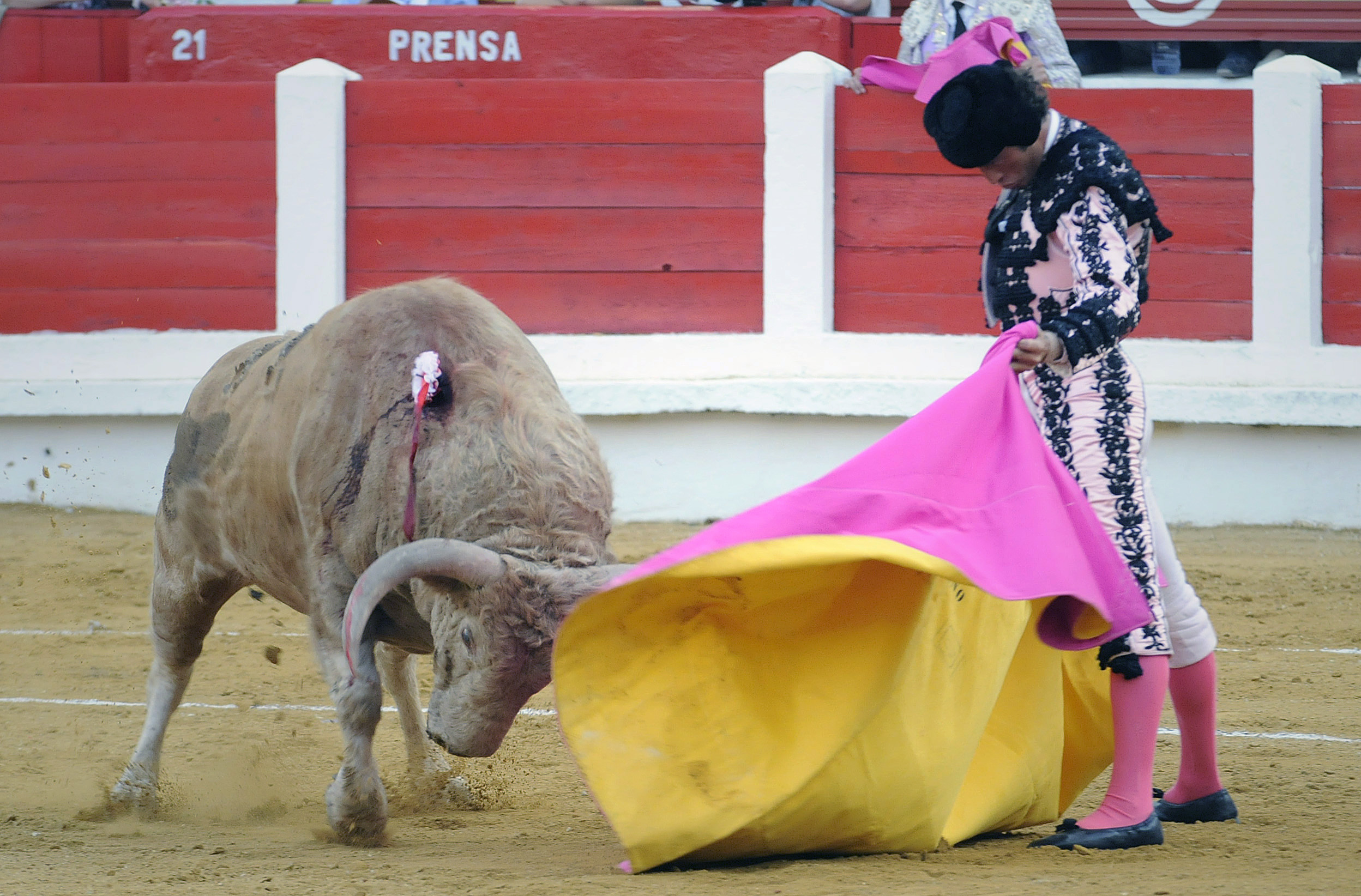
Finito de Córdoba at the Mérida fair in September 2008.

Born in Sabadell, Barcelona, and raised in El Arrecife, Córdoba. He debuted on 27 June 1987, in Santiponce (Seville), with Luis de Pauloba and Pallí. His debut with horses took place on 25 March 1989, in Marbella (Málaga), with Espartaco Chico and Pepe Luis Martín, and calves from Juan Pedro Domecq. His debut in Madrid was on 23 September 1990, with Luis de Pauloba and Cristo González, and cattle from Jandilla.

He took the alternativa in Córdoba on 23 May 1991, with Paco Ojeda as sponsor and Fernando Cepeda as a witness, with Torrestrella cattle. He confirmed the alternative in Madrid on 13 May 1993, with José Ortega Cano as sponsor and Manuel Caballero as a witness.

Throughout his career, he has had successes such as the main door of Las Ventas fighting bulls from Aldeanueva (1993), the indulto of Tabernero in Córdoba by Gabriel Rojas (1994), the main doors in La Monumental, the award for the best bullfighter of the Quito Bullfighting Fair (1999), or the golden pen award in Plaza de Toros de Valencia (2000).

== Personal life ==
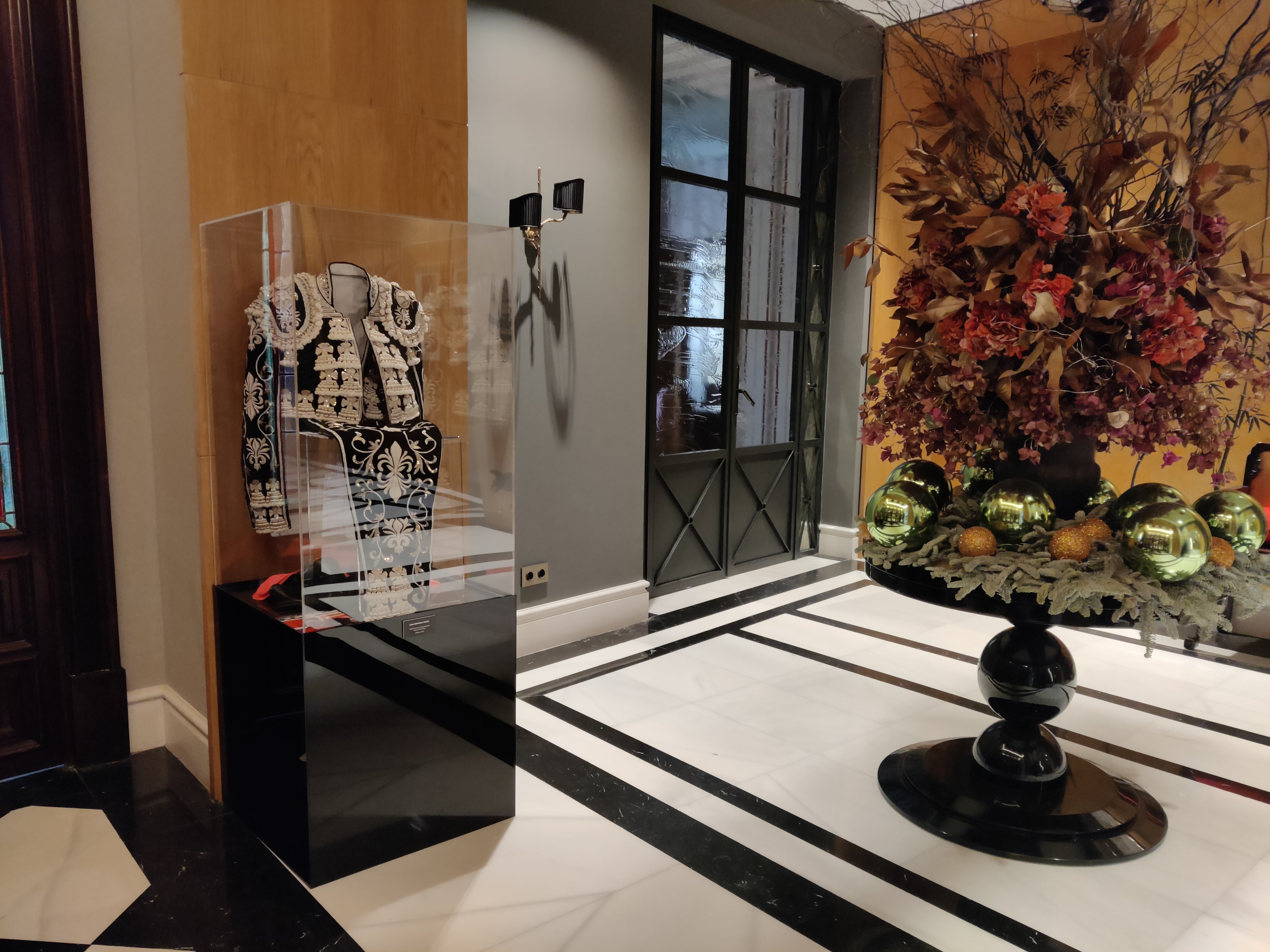
Traje de luces

On 21 October 2001, he married, in the Church of Santa Marina de Aguas Santas in Córdoba, model and television host Arantxa del Sol. They have two children.
