= Romanzo =

Given name

Romanzo is a given name. Notable people with the name include:

- Romanzo Bunn (1829–1909), American lawyer and judge
- Romanzo E. Davis (1831–1908), farmer and merchant from Middleton, Wisconsin, member of the Wisconsin State Senate
- Edwin Romanzo Elmer (1850–1923), American portrait, genre and still life painter

== See also ==
- Romansa (disambiguation)
- Romanz
- Romanza
- Romanzado
