= Børge Krogh =

Danish boxer (1942–2022)

Personal information
- Nationality: Danish
- Born: 18 April 1942 Aalborg, Denmark
- Died: 7 September 2022 (aged 80)

Sport
- Sport: Boxing

Børge Krogh (18 April 1942 – 7 September 2022) was a Danish boxer. He competed at the 1960 Summer Olympics and the 1964 Summer Olympics.

== See also ==
- Esmann, Knud (12 November 2024). "Børge Krogh". Danmarks Nationalleksikon (in Danish). Den Store Danske.
- Jensen, Claus (8 September 2022). "Dødsfald: En af Aalborgs helt store bokselegender er gået bort". Nordjyske (in Danish).
