= José Ortega Cano =

Spanish bullfighter (born 1953)

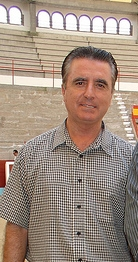
- Born: José María Ortega Cano; 23 December 1953 (age 72); Cartagena, Spain
- Spouses: Rocío Jurado (m. 1995; died 2006) Ana María Aldón (m. 2018)

José María Ortega Cano (born 23 December 1953) is a Spanish bullfighter. He was married to Spanish singer Rocío Jurado. They adopted two Colombian children, one boy and one girl.

He began his bullfighting career in 1973 in Madrid. He took his alternativa on 12 October 1974 in Zaragoza. Standing as his "godfather" was José Mari Manzanares, while the witness was Paco Bautista.

Ortega had a notably successful year in 1986, where he was very successful in many bullrings. In 1995 he married Rocío Jurado, a famous Spanish singer. He retired from bullfighting in 1998, but donned the traje de luces bullfighter outfit again in 2001 to attempt a comeback, albeit with less success. He entered retirement again in 2004 to take care of his wife, who had been diagnosed with pancreatic cancer, until her death in 2006. In 2007, Ortega Cano entered the bullring one final time in Olivenza.

He was a contestant on the Spanish version of Dancing with the Stars (Mira quién baila), where he showed no talent for dancing.

On 29 May 2011, he was involved in a car accident which left the other driver dead and himself in critical condition. After a slow recovery, he left the hospital on 11 July 2011. On 24 April 2013, First-instance criminal court No. 6 of Seville sentenced Ortega Cano to two years, six months and one day in prison for reckless homicide and reckless driving, causing the death of Carlos Parra in the aforementioned accident. He entered Zuera prison in Zaragoza on 23 April 2014. After a year and a month in prison he was left out in regime of semi-liberty.

On 27 September 2018, he married Ana María Aldón (his partner since 2012) by civil law in a notary office in Zaragoza. On 31 December 2020, during COVID-19 pandemic in Spain, Ortega Cano, his wife and his daughter tested positive for COVID-19 with notable symptoms after getting infected on Christmas Eve, recovering from the disease few weeks later but with mild sequelae.

In 2016, the Spanish satirical magazine Mongolia caricatured him in a promotional poster as a drunken extraterrestrial against a crashed flying saucer, a reference to the car crash which he had caused in 2011 and for which he had been sentenced in 2013. He sued the magazine alleging an attack on his honour, and was awarded EUR 40 000 in damages. The court ruling was confirmed on appeal by the Spanish Supreme Court in December 2020.
