= Santiago Moncada =

Spanish author and screenwriter

Santiago Moncada Mercadal (Madrid, 1928 - Madrid, 6 July 2018) was a Spanish writer, playwright and screenwriter. He used to chair Fundación SGAE and Sociedad General de Autores y Editores.

== Selected works ==
=== As playwright ===
- Paulina y los pingüinos (1956)
- Tránsito de madrugada (1958)
- Juegos de medianoche (1971)
- La muchacha sin retorno (1974)
- Violines y trompetas (1977)
- Siempre no es toda la vida (1979)
- Salvar a los delfines (1979)
- Vivamos hoy (1979)
- Las orejas del lobo (1980)
- El hombre del atardecer (1981)
- Las tormentas no vuelven (1982)
- Punto y coma (1987)
- Entre mujeres (1988), later renamed as Brujas (2010)
- Cena para dos (1991)
- Siempre en otoño (1993)
- Mejor en octubre (1994)
- Esmoquin (2001)
- Esmoquin 2 (2003)
- Desconcierto (2005)
- Esmoquin (2001)

=== As screenwriter ===
- The Corruption of Chris Miller (1973)
- The Girl from the Red Cabaret (1973)
- The Man Who Knew Love (1976)
- Missile X: The Neutron Bomb Incident (1979)
- Rest in Pieces (1987)
