= List of Argentine films of 1974 =

A list of films produced in Argentina in 1974:

Argentine films of 1974
Title	Director	Release	Genre
A - D
El amor infiel	Mario David	22 August	
La balada del regreso	Oscar Barney Finn	16 May	
Boquitas pintadas	Leopoldo Torre Nilsson	23 May	Drama
El camino hacia la muerte del viejo Reales	Gerardo Vallejo	10 April	
Ceremonias	Néstor Lescovich	3 January	
La civilización está haciendo masa y no deja oir	Julio César Ludueña	25 April	
Clínica con música	Francisco Guerrero	4 April	
Contigo y aquí	Fernando Siro	5 September	
Crimen en el hotel alojamiento	Leo Fleider	14 March	
Dale nomás	Osías Wilenski	20 June	
E - H
El Encanto del amor prohibido	Juan Batlle Planas (h)	18 July	
En el gran circo	Fernando Siro	11 July	
Ésta es mi Argentina	Leo Fleider	2 May	
Extraña invasión	Emilio Vieyra	10 October	
La flor de la mafia	Hugo Moser	21 March	
Gente en Buenos Aires	Eva Landeck	22 August	
Los golpes bajos	Mario Sábato	4 February	
La gran aventura	Emilio Vieyra	23 May	
Hay que romper la rutina	Enrique Cahen Salaberry	29 August	
Historia de un hombre de 561 años	Lucio Donantuoni	6 June	
I - R
Intimidades de una cualquiera	Armando Bó	2 May	
La Madre María	Lucas Demare	4 July	
El Mariscal del infierno	León Klimovsky	Prohibida	Drama
La Mary	Daniel Tinayre	8 August	
Minguito Tinguitela, papá	Enrique Dawi	27 June	comedy
Natasha	Eber Lobato	6 June	
Operación rosa rosa	Leo Fleider	20 June	
Papá Corazón se quiere casar	Enrique Cahen Salaberry	6 June	
La Patagonia rebelde	Héctor Olivera	13 June	
Quebracho	Ricardo Wullicher	16 May	
Rolando Rivas, taxista	Julio Saraceni	10 October	
S - Z
Sangre de vírgenes	Emilio Vieyra	21 February	
Seguro de castidad	Jorge Mobaied	31 October	
El sexo y el amor	Armando Bó	19 September	
La tregua	Sergio Renán	1 August	Drama
Una mujer, un pueblo	Carlos Luis Serrano	28 February	
Un viaje de locos	Rafael Cohen	1 August	
Los vampiros los prefieren gorditos	Gerardo Sofovich	7 March	
La vuelta de Martín Fierro	Enrique Dawi	9 May	
Yo tengo fe	Enrique Carreras	18 July	

== External links and references ==
- Argentine films of 1974 at the Internet Movie Database
