= Nelly Beltrán =

Argentine actress (1925-2007)

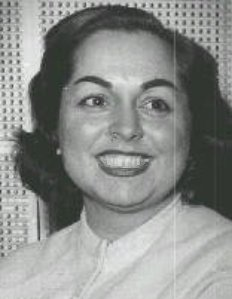
- Born: Nélida Dodó López Valverde; 29 August 1925; Buenos Aires, Argentina
- Died: 2 December 2007 (aged 82); Buenos Aires, Argentina
- Occupation: Actress
- Years active: 1936–1996
- Spouse: Maurice Jouvet
- Children: 3

Nélida Dodó López Valverde known professionally as Nelly Beltrán (29 August 1925 – 2 December 2007) was an Argentine actress. She appeared on the radio from the age of 10 and in 85 theatrical performances, 48 films and 3 dozen television shows between 1953 and 1996. She won a Martín Fierro Award as Best Comic Actress for her television work on La hermana San Sulpicio; participated in the film Pajarito Gómez which won the Best Youth Film award at the 15th Berlin International Film Festival; won a Konex Foundation Award; and was honored by the Argentina Actors Association in 2004 for her career contributions.

== Biography ==
Nélida Dodó López Valverde was born on 29 August 1925 in Buenos Aires, Argentina. From a young age she took painting and acting classes. Her career began in radio because her father was a friend of Cortez Conde, who wrote the program Ronda policial for Radio Porteña. The show was looking for new talent and asked her to test for a part. She was ten years old, read a script and was hired, along with Nelly Prince and Guido Gorgatti. She made numerous radio broadcasts, but the most important were La craneoteca de los genios (1952) and La revista dislocada (1954).

=== Theater and television ===
In 1952, the actress Beatriz Taibo suggested to Beltrán that she go to a tryout for the play Las lágrimas también se secan. She won a part and had her debut on the stage in the piece, which starred Irma Cordova. In 1953, joining the cast of Señorita maestra, she met Maurice Jouvet, an actor born in France, and within two weeks they were married. She played many theatrical seasons of comedies in Mar del Plata and Villa Carlos Paz. Some of her finest performances were in Dos imbéciles felices, which ran for two seasons 1971 and 1972; El enfermo imaginario (1981), which played in Teatro Cervantes, and Boeing-Boeing, which ran for four seasons and whose cast included Ernesto Bianco, Paulette Christian, Ambar La Fox, Osvaldo Miranda, and Beatriz Taibo.

On television, she participated in comic series, with the first being Risas y sonrisas (1958–1959) and Telecómicos (1960). In 1960 Beltrán won the Martín Fierro Award from the Association of Argentine Television and Radio Journalists (APTRA) for Best Comic Actress for her work in La hermana San Sulpicio. She performed a few dramatic roles, like two from the classic horror master Narciso Ibáñez Menta El vendedor de ilusiones (1971) and Mañana puedo morir (1979), and Coraje, mamá (1985). The highlights of her television career included Telecómicos (1960, 1970–1973), Todo es amor (1964), the Channel 13 hit La Banda del Golden Rocket (1991) in which she played the grandmother, and her final role as Teresa in the telenovela Los ángeles no lloran.

=== Movies ===
Beltrán debuted on the big screen in 1955 in Para vestir santos, directed by Leopoldo Torre Nilsson with Tita Merello. She followed with Historia de una carta (1957) and then a role in Rosaura a las diez (1958), directed by Mario Soffici, where she earned critical acclaim for her portrayal of a prostitute. She released a flurry of films including Socios para la aventura ( 1958) Dos tipos con suerte (1960) and Libertad bajo palabra (1961), before earning praise again in El Rufián (1961), with Marcos Zucker, directed by Daniel Tinayre.

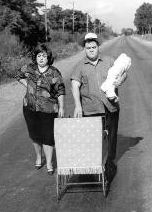
Nelly Beltrán and Javier Portales in "Canuto Cañete y los 40 ladrones" (1964)

In 1962, Beltrán made El televisor under the direction of Guillermo Fernández Jurado with Ubaldo Martínez and Blanca del Prado and in 1964, she made Canuto Cañete y los 40 ladrones with Carlos Balá and Mariángeles Ibarreta under the direction of Leo Fleider. The following year, she repeated the role of Mrs. Salvador with Carlos Balá playing Canuto Cañete in Canuto Cañete, detective privado and made Pajarito Gómez a satirical film about the promotional machine behind the Argentine pop stars of the 1960s. It was the Argentine entry for 1965 in the Berlin Film Festival and won the Best Youth Film award.

Beltrán earned her only starring role in La Gorda (1966), along with Rodolfo Zapata. The movie was based on a song composed by Zapata which was in the style of Argentine folk dances and earned such acclaim that it became a musical, aired on the radio, was taken to television, and ultimately became the idea behind the movie. In 1967 she was directed by Julio Saraceni in Villa Cariño with Roberto Airaldi and Juan Carlos Altavista and the following year released Villa Cariño está que arde, directed by Emilio Vieyra with Altavista again and Ricardo Bauleo.

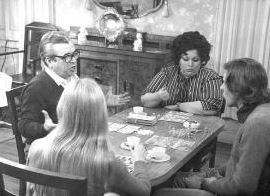
Nelly Beltrán in "Autocine Mon Amour" (1972) From left: Rodolfo Crespi, Nelly Beltrán, Claudio Levrino and with her back to the camera Cristina del Valle

In 1972 she played a supporting role to Palito Ortega and Libertad Lamarque in La sonrisa de mamá directed by Enrique Carreras, which was followed that same year by Autocine Mon Amour under the direction of Fernando Siro which she acted in with her husband, Maurice Jouvet. She made a string of films in the 1970s, including En el gran circo (1974), El profesor erótico (1976), El divorcio está de moda (1978), and Yo también tengo fiaca (1978).

1981 was a year of highs and lows. Beltrán made the film Abierto día y noche (1981), was awarded the Konex Foundation Diploma of Merit and lost her only daughter in a car crash. In 1982, she released two films La magia de Los Parchís and Las aventuras de los Parchís with the musical group Parchís.

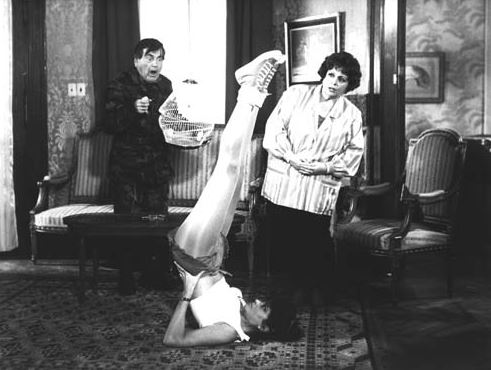
Left to right: Mario Sánchez, Adriana Salgueiro (doing shoulder stand) and Nelly Beltrán, in "Los colimbas al ataque" (1987)

From 1982 to 1987 she worked with Jorge Porcel and Alberto Olmedo in a series of movies, usually directed by Enrique Carreras and scripted by Juan Carlos Mesa. These included: Los fierecillos indomables (1982), Los fierecillos se divierten (1983), Los colimbas se divierten (1986), and Los colimbas al ataque (1987). But the tragic death of Olmedo in 1988, and health problems, put an end to series. She returned to make one final film, No hay hombres de izquierda, directed by Alberto Fischerman, starring Georgina Barbarossa and the Italian actor Giuliano Gemma.

In August 2004 the Argentina Actors Association paid tribute for her long career, which included 85 theatrical performances and over 40 movies. It was attended by Pablo Alarcon, Osvaldo Miranda, Rafael Carret and María Concepción César.

Beltrán died on 2 December 2007 in Buenos Aires following complications from diabetes, and was buried on 3 December in the Pantheon of Actors La Chacarita Cemetery.

== Private life ==
Beltrán first married Juan Lejcovich, by whom she had two children, who were taken by relatives to the United States in the 1940s.

In 1953, she married Maurice Jouvet (3 February 1923 Hendaye, France—5 March 1999 Buenos Aires, Argentina). They had one child, Mónica Jouvet (15 April 1955 Buenos Aires—19 April 1981 Buenos Aires).

== Awards ==
- 1960 Martín Fierro Award for Best Comic Actress
- 1981 Konex Foundation Diploma of Merit

== Filmography ==
=== Films ===
- Para vestir santos (1955)
- Historia de una carta (1957)
- Rosaura a las diez (1958)
- Socios para la aventura (1958)
- Dos tipos con suerte (1959)
- El Rufián (1961)
- Libertad bajo palabra (1961)
- El televisor (1962)
- Propiedad (1962)
- Pelota de cuero (Historia de una pasión) (1963)
- Placeres conyugales (1963)
- Canuto Cañete y los 40 ladrones (1964)
- Canuto Cañete, detective privado (1965)
- Pajarito Gómez -una vida feliz- (1965)
- Bicho raro (1965)
- Los tímidos visten de gris (inédita) (1965)
- La buena vida (1966)
- Vivir es formidable (1966)
- La Gorda (1966)
- Villa Cariño (1967)
- Coche cama, alojamiento (1967)
- Destino para dos (1968)
- Villa Cariño está que arde (1968)
- La vida continúa (1969)
- La sonrisa de mamá (1972)
- El picnic de los Campanelli (1972)
- Autocine mon amour (1972)
- Crimen en el hotel alojamiento (1974)
- En el gran circo (1974)
- Un mundo de amor (1975)
- Don Carmelo Il Capo (1976)
- El profesor erótico (1976)
- El divorcio está de moda (de común acuerdo) (1978)
- Yo también tengo fiaca (1978)
- Abierto día y noche (1981)
- La magia de Los Parchís (1981)
- Las aventuras de los Parchís (1982)
- Los fierecillos indomables (1982)
- Los fierecillos se divierten (1982)
- Los colimbas se divierten (1986)
- Rambito y Rambón, primera misión (1986)
- Los colimbas al ataque (1987)
- Ya no hay hombres (1991)

=== Television ===
- Risas y sonrisas (1958–1959)
- Telecómicos (1960)
- La hermana San Sulpicio (1960)
- Nosotras las mujeres (1961)
- Los porotos somos nueve (1962)
- Teleteatro Odol (1962) Episode: "Un triste perfume a tabaco"
- Todo es amor (1964)
- Su comedia favorita (1966)
- La baranda (1969–1970)
- La foto (1970)
- El tinglado de la risa (1970)
- Telecómicos (1970–1973)
- El Vendedor de ilusiones (1971)
- Viernes de Pacheco (1972)
- Mi hijo Rasputín (1973)
- El Teatro de Pacheco (1973) Episode: "El casado casa quiere"
- La comedia brillante (1974)
- Humor a la italiana (1974) Episode: "El amor por la cornisa"
- Mañana puedo morir (1979)
- El teatro de Mercedes Carreras (1981) Episode: "Vida de Cómicos"
- Los especiales de ATC (1981) Episode: "La muela de juicio"
- Los especiales de ATC (1981) Episode: "Nunca te olvidaré"
- Como en el teatro (1981–1982)
- Teatro de humor (1982)
- Un Beso muy peligroso (1982)
- Jorge vive en Martínez (1982)
- La comedia del domingo (1982)
- Mamá por horas (1983)
- Domingos de Pacheco (1983)
- Dar el alma (1984)
- Coraje mamá (1985)
- Las mil y una de Sapag (1987)
- Por siempre amigos (1987)
- Su comedia favorita (1990) Episode: "Una jueza implacable"
- La Banda del Golden Rocket (1991–1993)
- Los Ángeles no lloran (1996)
