= List of Argentine films of 1961 =

A list of films produced in Argentina in 1961:

Argentine films of 1961
Title	Director	Release	Genre
A - F
Alias Gardelito	Lautaro Murúa	30 August	
América a medianoche	Giuseppe Maria Scotese	1 November	
Amorina	Hugo del Carril	6 April	drama
Canción de arrabal	Enrique Carreras	26 October	
El centroforward murió al amanecer	René Mugica	22 June	
Don Frutos Gómez	Rubén W. Cavallotti	4 May	
Esta tierra es mía	Hugo del Carril	6 September	
Favela	Armando Bó	3 August	drama
G - O
Los hampones	Alberto D'Aversa	16 February	
Hijo de hombre	Lucas Demare	27 April	drama
Libertad bajo palabra	Alfredo Bettanín	23 November	
La maestra enamorada	Julio Saraceni	2 March	
La mano en la trampa	Leopoldo Torre Nilsson	8 June	
Mi Buenos Aires querido	Francisco Mugica	28 March	
La novia	Ernesto Arancibia	12 September	
P - Z
Piel de verano	Leopoldo Torre Nilsson	31 August	
Punto y banca	Enrique Carreras	1 February	
Quinto año nacional	Rodolfo Blasco	26 October	
Rebelde con causa	Antonio Cunill	29 June	
The Romance of a Gaucho	Rubén W. Cavallotti	18 August	
El rufián	Daniel Tinayre	7 September	
Tiernas ilusiones	Dino Minitti	22 June	
Tres veces Ana	David José Kohon	2 November	
Una Americana en Buenos Aires	George Cahan	6 July	

== External links and references ==
- Argentine films of 1961 at the Internet Movie Database
