= Autocine Mon Amour =

1972 film

- Directed by: Fernando Siro
- Written by: Ángel Cortese; Carlos Alberto Cresté
- Starring: Luis Brandoni; Marta Bianchi
- Release date: 5 October 1972
- Running time: 81 minute
- Country: Argentina
- Language: Spanish

Autocine mon amour is a 1972 Argentine comedy film directed by Fernando Siro and written by Ángel Cortese and Carlos Alberto Cresté.

== Cast ==
- Luis Brandoni
- Marta Bianchi
- Ulises Dumont
- Ricardo Bauleo
- Gilda Lousek
- Maurice Jouvet
- Vicente Rubino
- Fernando Siro
- Nelly Beltrán
- Cristina del Valle
- Claudio Levrino
- Oscar Viale
- Ovidio Fuentes
- Edgardo Cané
- Hugo Caprera

== Release and acclaim ==
The film premiered on 5 October 1972.
