= Jouvet =

Jouvet is a French surname. It may refer to:

- Émilie Jouvet (born 1976), French photographer and filmmaker
- Louis Jouvet (1887–1951), French actor
- Maurice Jouvet (1923–1999), French-born Argentine actor
- Michel Jouvet (1925–2017), French neuroscientist
- Mónica Jouvet, Argentine actress
- Pierre Jouvet (born 1986), French politician

== See also ==
- Louvet
