= Made in Argentina =

- Directed by: Juan José Jusid
- Written by: Juan José Jusid; Nelly Fernández Tiscornia
- Based on: The play Made in Lanús, by Nelly Fernández Tiscornia
- Produced by: Alberto Trigo; Isidro O. Miguel; Rolando Epstein
- Starring: Luis Brandoni; Marta Bianchi; Leonor Manso; Patricio Contreras; Hugo Arana; Frank Vincent
- Cinematography: Hugo Colace
- Edited by: Juan Carlos Macías
- Music by: Emilio Kauderer; Eladia Blázquez
- Production company: Progress Communications
- Release date: 14 May 1987
- Running time: 86 minutes
- Country: Argentina
- Languages: Spanish; English

Made in Argentina is a 1987 Argentine comedy drama film co-written and directed by Juan José Jusid and starring Luis Brandoni, Marta Bianchi, Leonor Manso, Patricio Contreras and Frank Vincent.

== Synopsis ==
Osvaldo and Mabel, an Argentinean couple exiled in the United States due to political reasons, travel to their home country after ten years to reunite with their relatives and friends, including "el Negro," Mabel's brother, and his wife, "la Yoli." Mabel offers her brother the opportunity to work in New York with the aim of improving their economic situation, but his wife opposes it.

== Cast ==
- Luis Brandoni - Osvaldo
- Marta Bianchi - Mabel
- Leonor Manso - Yoli/Cuñada
- Patricio Contreras - El negro/Cuñado
- Hugo Arana
- Frank Vincent - Vito
- Mario Luciani
- Alberto Busaid - Quique
- Gabriela Flores
- Alejo García Pintos
- Jorge Rivera López
- Marzenka Novak
