= Edmundo =

Edmundo is variation of the English name Edmund, meaning “protector of prosperity or riches.” It is common in Spanish and Portuguese-speaking countries. Some individuals include:

== People ==
=== Association footballers ===
- Edmundo (footballer), full name Edmundo Alves de Souza Neto (born 1971), former Brazilian footballer
- Edmundo (footballer, born 1999), full name Edmundo Appolinario (born 1999), Brazilian footballer
- Edmundo Zura (born 1983), Ecuadoran footballer

=== Other people ===
- Edmundo Arias (1925–1993), Colombian musician
- Edmundo Arias, Venezuelan actor, politician and engineer
- Edmundo Chirinos, Venezuelan psychiatrist
- Edmundo Diquez, Venezuelan architect
- Edmundo Fernandez, Venezuelan physician and politician
- Edmundo Farolan, Filipino writer
- Edmundo González (born 1949), Venezuelan politician and diplomat
- Edmundo Luongo, Venezuelan politician and engineer
- Edmundo Monsanto, Venezuelan painter
- Edmundo Ros, Trinidadian musician
- Edmundo Rivero, Argentine singer
- Edmundo Sanders, Argentine actor
- Edmundo Jarquín, Nicaraguan politician
- Edmundo Pisano (1919–1997), Chilean botanist and geographer
- Edmundo O'Gorman, Irish-Mexican writer and historian
- Edmundo Sosa, Dominican baseball player
- Edmundo Valdemar, Venezuelan actor

== Fictional characters ==
- Edmundo Guatlo, the antagonist of Gumapang Ka sa Lusak (1990)
- Edmundo 'Eddie' Diaz, a firefighter in the TV show, 9-1-1.
