= Alberto Barcel =

Argentine actor (1907–1975)

- Born: 1907; Argentina
- Died: 1975 (aged 67–68); Argentina
- Occupation: Actor
- Years active: 1948-1966

Alberto Barcel (1907–1975) was an Argentine actor. He appeared in more than 60 films from 1948 to 1966. He starred in the film Circe (1964), which was entered into the 14th Berlin International Film Festival.

== Selected filmography ==
- Passport to Rio (1948)
- Dance of Fire (1949)
- The Marihuana Story (1950)
- El Vampiro negro (1953)
- The Lady of the Camellias (1953)
- The Black Market (1953)
- Alejandra (1956)
- Behind a Long Wall (1958)
- The Female: Seventy Times Seven (1962)
- Circe (1964)
- Así O De Otra Manera (1964)
- The Escaped (1964)
- Pajarito Gómez (1965)
