= Thelma Stefani =

Argentinian actor

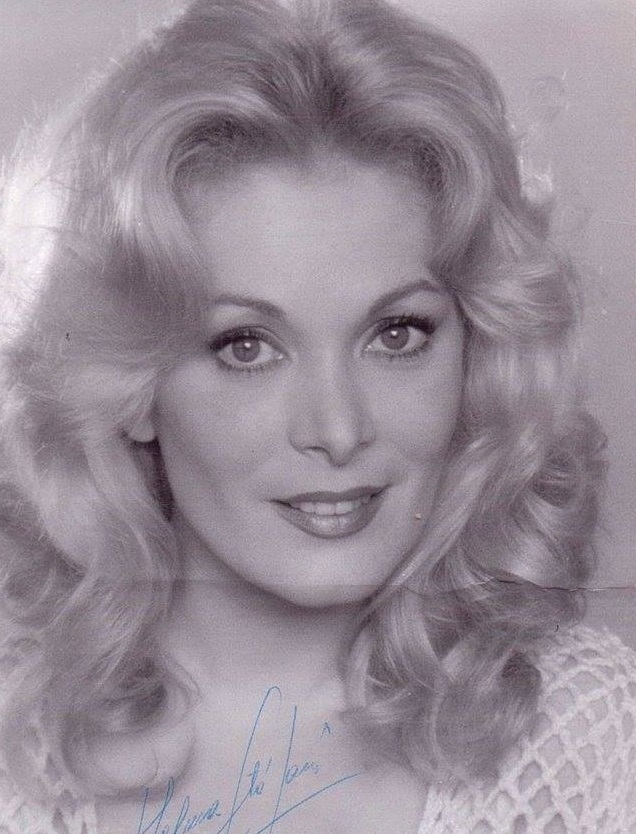
- Born: 25 October 1948; Villa Luro, Buenos Aires, Argentina
- Died: 30 April 1986 (aged 37); Colegiales, Buenos Aires, Argentina
- Occupations: Actress, dancer

Thelma Stefani (25 October 1948 – 30 April 1986) was an Argentine actress, dancer and vedette.

== Early years ==
Stefani was born in the neighborhood of Villa Luro, and was the youngest daughter of an Italian couple. Since she was little, she had begun to develop her vocation as an actress. Encouraged by her mother, she had entered the Teatro Colón to study dance, she studied 7 years to be a dancer and at 20 she abandoned them.

== Career ==
Stefani's big screen debut as a lead came in the 1974 film Natasha, opposite Enzo Viena and directed by Eber Lobato. The film was a resounding failure, although with this film critics began to compare her beauty to Marilyn Monroe and to call her "The Argentine Marilyn Monroe", a popularity that allowed her to become the first star at the Maipo Theater. In this way she was consecrated as "best revelation actress of the year". In that same year she also appeared in Clínica con música, in the role of a sexologist, along with an ensemble cast made up of Moria Casán, Marta Bianchi, Carlos Perciavalle, Antonio Gasalla, Alberto Anchart and Roberto Escalada.

In 1976, Stefani acted in the role of Victoria in the comedy La Aventura explosiva, with Ricardo Bauleo, Víctor Bó and Julio de Grazia. Also in that same year, she appeared in two more films, El Profesor erótico and Don Carmelo il capo, in the role of Lily. In 1978, she starred in three films, Con mi mujer no puedo, along with Guillermo Bredeston, Leonor Benedetto and Javier Portales, Yo también tengo fiaca and Broken Comedy, with Gianni Lunadei and Elsa Daniel. Then in 1979, she starred in Millonarios a la fuerza, in the role of Patricia with Elena Lucena, Luis Landriscina and Mario Sánchez, and No apta para menores.

In 1980, Stefani acted in the Argentine cult comedy ¡Qué linda es mi familia!, alongside Niní Marshall, Luis Sandrini and Palito Ortega. A year later she starred in El joker, with Santiago Bal, Alicia Bruzzo, Beba Bidart and Erika Wallner. In 1985, she participated in El telo y la tele, with Moria Casán, Emilio Disi, Jorge Martínez, Carmen Barbieri, Tristán, Silvia Pérez, Javier Portales, Haydée Padilla, Adrián Martel, Luisa Albinoni and Guillermo Francella. Her last film was Correccional de mujeres in 1986, along with Julio de Grazia, Edda Bustamante, Érika Wallner, where her role is that of a prisoner named Dolores, forced her to face a great challenge by having to submerge the head in a used toilet.

== Death ==
Stefani combined antidepressants, sleeping pills and esotericisms such as tarot, Umbandism and rites from different western and eastern origins.

On the night of 28 April 1986, she invited some of her friends to her house: counting herself, there were thirteen, in total, a number associated with bad luck. "Someone of us is going to die," she said as she left her room, all dressed in black.

Two days later, on 30 April, after a desperate call to a friend, around 1:00 a.m., Stefani arrived, rang the bell of the 21st floor, in Aguilar y Cabildo, in the Colegiales neighborhood. She never imagined it was her last irony. Stefani threw herself from the balcony onto a parked van. She wrote a letter in which she said: "I'm tired, I don't want to live anymore." Stefani was 37 years old.
