= La Aventura de los paraguas asesinos =

- Directed by: Carlos Galettini
- Release date: 1979
- Country: Argentina
- Language: Spanish

La Aventura de los paraguas asesinos (transl. Adventure of the Umbrella Murderers) is a 1979 Argentine comedy film directed by Carlos Galettini.

== Cast ==
- Ricardo Bauleo as Tiburón
- Víctor Bó as Delfín
- Julio De Grazia as Mojarrita
- Graciela Alfano as Agente Serena
- Gianni Lunadei
