= Los Chiflados del batallón =

1975 film by Enrique Dawi

Los chiflados del batallón
- Directed by: Enrique Dawi
- Written by: Jorge Falcón
- Edited by: Higinio Vecchione
- Release date: 6 February 1975 (Argentina)
- Running time: 90 minutes
- Country: Argentina
- Language: Spanish

Los chiflados del batallón is a 1975 Argentine film directed by Enrique Dawi.

== Cast ==
- Adriana Aguirre
- Albino Rojas Martínez (El Soldado Chamamé)
- Mario Sánchez
- Carlos Vanoni
- Carlos Scazziota
- Horacio Heredia
- Eddie Pequenino
- Tono Andreu
- Luis Orbegoso
- Gloria Geddes
- Osvaldo Castro
- Gilberto Peyret
- Ernesto Nogués
- Julio Carril
- Rosalina Villari
- Vicky García
- El Cuarteto Leo
- Nya Quesada
