= Ricardo Morán =

Ricardo Morán may refer to:

- Ricardo Morán (actor) (1941–2015), Argentine actor
- Ricardo Morán (director) (born 1974), Peruvian director
