= Adriana Aguirre =

Argentine actress

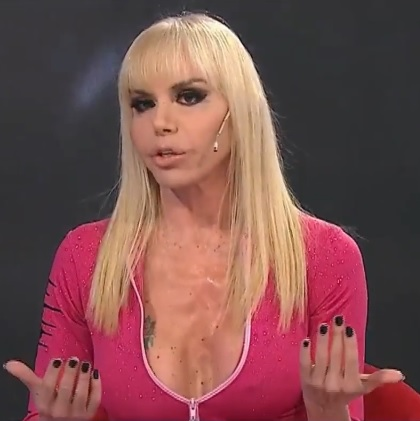
- Aguierre in 2023
- Born: Adriana Beatriz Aguirre; 16 December 1951 (age 74); Santo Tomé, Santa Fe, Argentina
- Occupation: Actress
- Years active: 1972–present

Adriana Beatriz Aguirre (born 16 December 1951) is an Argentine actress and vedette. She performed in several Argentine films and in more than 80 plays.

== Biography ==
Adriana Beatriz Aguirre was born in Santo Tomé, Santa Fe, on 16 December 1951. She studied theatre in the late 1960s.

Aguirre began working as a theatre actress in the early 1970s. In 1972, she made her cinema debut at the age of 21, in the film La sonrisa de mamá, where she had a supporting role. It was not until the 1976 film, Don Carmelo Il Capo, that she played a leading role, Lulu. During that decade, she made most of her films, which were generally in the comic genre. She had great success in El picnic de los Campanelli (1972), Siempre fuimos compañeros (1973), Rolando Rivas, taxista (1974), and Encuentros cercanos con señoras de cualquier tipo (1978). The last film she performed in was Gran Valor en la Facultad de Medicina (1981), with Juan Carlos Calabró. In the following years, she returned to the theatre and it was then that she became a star, along with Graciela Alfano and Alejandra Pradón, among others. In 1995, she appeared on the television series, Como pan caliente. Between 2001 and 2003, there was a resurgence of her fame, when Aguirre was a recurring guest on television programs such as Rumores, Intrusos en el espectáculo, and ZapTV, where she starred in fights with other media personalities such as Guido Süller, Silvia Süller, and her own husband, Ricardo García. In 2007, Aguirre reappeared on television, being a guest on several programs such as Los Profesionales de Siempre and that of Susana Giménez. Aguirre also participated in the second edition of Cantando por un Sueño, starting in October of that year. On 15 April 2008, she was cast in Showmatch, a program hosted by Marcelo Tinelli, for part of the segment Bailando por un Sueño 2008; in the third week, she was eliminated by public vote. In June 2010, she guest starred in a skit in Susana Giménez's show, La empleada pública.

In 1998, Aguirre married Héctor Ricardo García, in a Greek-style ceremony, after three years of dating. In May 2005, Aguirre was assaulted and beaten in her apartment in the Buenos Aires neighborhood of Palermo.

== Filmography ==
- 1972: La sonrisa de mamá
- 1972: El Picnic de los Campanelli
- 1973: The Desire to Live
- 1973: Siempre fuimos compañeros
- 1974: Clínica con música
- 1974: Rolando Rivas, taxista
- 1975: Los Chiflados del batallón
- 1975: La super, super aventura
- 1975: Las procesadas
- 1976: The Kids Grow Up
- 1976: Don Carmelo il capo
- 1976: La Guerra de los sostenes
- 1978: Encuentros muy cercanos con señoras de cualquier tipo
- 1981: Gran Valor en la Facultad de Medicina
- 2017: La vida sin brillos

== Television ==
- 1972: Los Campaneli
- 1973–1975: Porcelandia
- 1973: Pobre Diabla
- 1974: Rolando Rivas, taxista
- 1975: Piel Naranja
- 1977: Porcelandia Show
- 1982: Sexcitante
- 1980–1983: Polémica en el bar
- 1979–1983: La peluquería de Don Mateo
- 1982–1983: Operación ja-já
- 1984: Porcelandia
- 1995: Como pan caliente
- 1997: Mediodías con Mauro
- 2002: Zap TV
- 2002: La tarde de Adriana
- 2007: Cantando por un sueño
- 2008: Bailando por un sueño 2008
- 2008: La noche del domingo
- 2010: Susana Giménez: La Empleada Pública
- 2010: Aguirre Show – Televisión de San Luis
- 2012: Fort Night Show
- 2014: Bailando por un sueño 2014 – Pareja invitada en ritmo Merengue junto a Ricardo García

== Theatre ==
- 1976: El Gran Cambio – Teatro Cómico.
- 1977: ¡Que piernas para el mundial!.
- 1978: Los reyes en Tabarís – Teatro Tabarís.
- ????: Atrapadas sin bikinis – Teatro Olimpo.
- 1979: ¡Que Revista... en Tabarís – Teatro Tabaris.
- 1980: La Revista – Teatro Astros.
- 1981: ¿Vio...La Revista? – Teatro Astros.
- 1981: ¡¡Revistísima!!.
- 1982: El Revistón – Teatro Astros.
- 1982: ¡Si... Fantástica! – Teatro Bar de Villa Carlos Paz.
- 1983: La revista multitudinaria – Teatro Astros.
- 1985: Revista de Carlos Paz.
- 1986: Adriana 11.
- 1987: Teatro El Nacional – Rosario.
- 1988: La revista del Escolazo.
- 1989: Una revista de cinco estrellas.
- 1990: Comedia en el Teatro Astral.
- 1995: Aquí está La Revista – Teatro Metropolitan.
- 1997: Locas por dolores.
- 1999: La doctora está que arde- Teatro Provincial in Mar del Plata.
- 2002: El precio del pudor.
- 2003: La noche está que arde – Villa Carlos Paz.
- 2008: Doña Flor y sus dos maridos – Mar del Plata.
- 2012: Totalmente locos – Teatro La Campana in Mar del Planta.
- 2013: Solamente amantes por un verano – Mar del Plata. Multiespacio 5 Sentidos.
- 2014: Son furor – Teatro Arenales in Mar del Plata.
- 2015: Solo amantes por un verano – Teatro Arenales in Mar del Plata.
- 2015/2017: Extinguidas – Teatro Regina.
- 2019: La Super Revista de Magia y Humor – Teatro La Campana in Mar del Plata.
- 2019: La gran revista de Termas.
- 2020: Súper Revista 2020 in Mar del Plata.

== Discography ==
- 1977: No puedo mirarte a los ojos ésta noche – (Simple) – POLYDOR
- 1984: Pena por una pena – SKY

== Music videos ==
- 2013: «Qué tonto fui» - with Ricardo García.
- 2013: «Si yo fuera tu amante» - with Ricardo García.
- 2013: «Más que un loco» - with Ricardo García.
- 2013: «No vale la pena» - with Ricardo García.
- 2013: «Amar o morir» - with Ricardo García.
- 2013: «Qué queda de éste amor» - with Ricardo García.
- 2014: «La reina de la bailanta» - with Ricardo García.
