= Strange Invasion =

Extraña invasión
- Directed by: Emilio Vieyra
- Written by: Philip Kearney; Les Rendelstein; Emilio Vieyra
- Produced by: Orestes A. Trucco
- Starring: Richard Conte; Jorge Rivera López; Eddie Pequenino; Edmundo Sanders; Mónica Cahen D'Anvers
- Cinematography: Aníbal González Paz
- Edited by: Juan Carlos Macías
- Music by: Víctor Buchino
- Production company: Productores Argentinos Asociados
- Distributed by: Productores Argentinos Asociados
- Release date: 1965
- Running time: 85 minutes
- Countries: Argentina; United States
- Languages: English (International Version); Spanish (original language)

Strange Invasion (Extraña invasión, also known as Stay Tuned for Terror) is a 1965 Argentine-American science fiction film directed by Emilio Vieyra and starring Richard Conte, Jorge Rivera López, Eddie Pequenino, Anna Strasberg and Mónica Cahen D'Anvers. It was written by Philip Kearney, Les Rendelstein and Emilio Vieyra. Adolfo Aristarain was assistant director.

== Plot ==
In Clearview, a town in the South of the U.S., strange waves begin to appear on the TV sets, hypnotizing the very young and the very old. Children and old people begin to wander around town in a zombie-like state. When the signal drops, there is a violent reaction and the army must be called in.

== Cast ==
- Richard Conte
- Jorge Rivera López
- Eddie Pequenino
- Eduardo Muñoz
- Anna Strasberg (as Anna Mizrahi)
- Ignacio de Soroa
- Sergio Vandes
- Edmundo Sanders
- Susana Beltrán
- Emilio Vieyra
- Mónica Cahen D'Anvers (as Monica Mihánovich)

== Production ==
Except for the opening scene, the film was filmed in Ciudad Jardin.
