= Carlos Gómez (Paraguayan actor) =

Paraguayan actor (1917–2009

Carlos Victorino Gómez Castillo (Note: In this Spanish name, the first or paternal surname is Gómez and the second or maternal family name is Castillo.) (6 March 1917 – 15 August 2009) was a Paraguayan actor. Performing as Carlos Gómez, he worked in theatre, radio and television, and cinema, in both his native country and Argentina.

== Career ==
Carlos Gómez was born in Asunción on 6 March 1917. He served as a telephone operator during the Chaco War (1932 to 1935) before debuting as a theatre actor with the Destello Juvenil company.

At the outbreak of the Paraguayan Civil War in 1947 he relocated to Buenos Aires, Argentina. He returned to Paraguay in 1948 but continued to work in radio, television and films in both countries.

In poor health in later years, his final theatre work was in 2007 when he directed the play El último caudillo and performed in La madama. He received a visit from President Fernando Lugo to enquire about his health on 5 August 2009 and died at his home in Asunción at the age of 92 ten days later.

== Filmography ==
Carlos Gómez's films included:

- Alto Paraná (1958)
- Aquello que amamos (1959)
- La sangre y la semilla (1959)
- Don Frutos Gómez (1961)
- Hijo de hombre (1961)
- La burrerita de Ypacaraí (1962)
- Propiedad (1962)
- Convención de vagabundos (1965)
- Dos quijotes sobre ruedas (1966)

== Awards ==
Carlos Gómez received various awards, including:

- Commander of the National Order of Merit of Paraguay
- Arturo Alsina Prize for theatre
- Favoured Son (Hijo Dilecto) of Asunción
