= List of Argentine films of 1976 =

A list of films produced in Argentina in 1976:

Argentine films of 1976
| Title | Director | Release | Genre |
|---|---|---|---|
| Adiós Sui Generis | Bebe Kamin | 2 September | musical |
| Alicia en el país de las maravillas | Eduardo Plá | 9 December | |
| El canto cuenta su historia | Fernando Ayala and Héctor Olivera | 27 August | musical |
| Los chicos crecen | Enrique Carreras | 13 May | |
| Los cuatro secretos | Simón Feldman | 8 December | |
| Don Carmelo Il Capo | Juan Carlos Pelliza | 6 May | |
| Dos locos en el aire | Palito Ortega | 22 July | |
| Embrujada | Armando Bó | 18 November | |
| El gordo de América | Enrique Cahen Salaberry | 11 March | Comedy |
| La Guerra de los sostenes | Gerardo Sofovich | 30 September | |
| Los Hombres sólo piensan en eso | Enrique Cahen Salaberry | 2 September | Comedy |
| Juan que reía | Carlos Galettini | 15 July | |
| Los muchachos de antes no usaban arsénico | José A. Martínez Suárez | 22 April | |
| La noche del hurto | Hugo Sofovich | 10 June | |
| No toquen a la nena | Juan José Jusid | 5 August | |
| Piedra libre | Leopoldo Torre Nilsson | 16 September | |
| El profesor erótico | Rafael Cohen | 1 July | |
| Sola | Raúl de la Torre | 19 August | |
| Soñar, soñar | Leonardo Favio | 8 July | |
| Te necesito tanto, amor | Julio Saraceni | 4 March | |
| Tú me enloqueces | Sandro | 12 August | |
