= Alberto Argibay =

Argentine actor

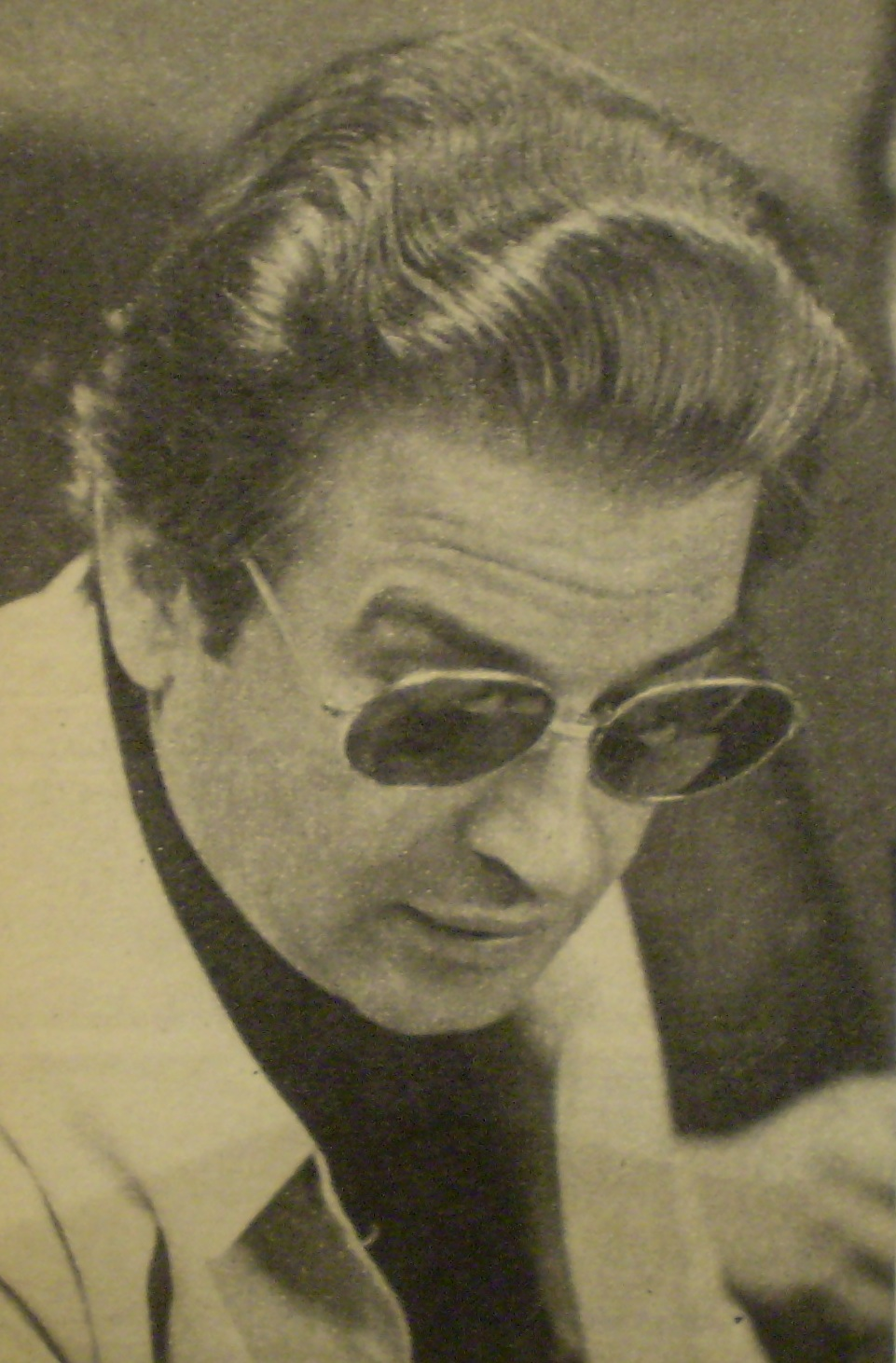
- Born: 25 October 1932; Pico Truncado, Santa Cruz, Argentina
- Died: 10 September 2007 (aged 74); Buenos Aires, Argentina
- Occupation: Actor
- Years active: 1958–1998

Alberto Argibay (25 October 1932 – 10 September 2007) was an Argentine actor. He appeared in 51 films and television shows between 1958 and 1998. He starred in the film Circe, which was entered into the 14th Berlin International Film Festival.

== Selected filmography ==
- I Was Born in Buenos Aires (1959)
- Dos tipos con suerte (1960)
- Alias Gardelito (1961)
- The Old Young People (1962)
- Circe (1964)
- Amor libre (1969)
- La sartén por el mango (1974)
- What's Autumn? (1977)
- Contragolpe (1979)
- Andrea Celeste (1979)
