= Propiedad =

- Directed by: Mario Soffici
- Written by: Mario Soffici, Dalmiro Sáenz
- Starring: Nelly Beltrán, Tato Bores, Graciela Borges
- Edited by: Jorge Gárate
- Release date: 13 June 1962
- Running time: 83 minutes
- Country: Argentina
- Language: Spanish

Propiedad is a 1962 Argentine film directed by Mario Soffici.

== Cast ==
- Nelly Beltrán
- Tato Bores
- Graciela Borges
- Juan Carlos Galván
- Zelmar Gueñol
- Carlos Gómez
- Maurice Jouvet
- Carmen Llambí
- Horacio Nicolai
- Nathán Pinzón
- Mario Soffici
