= Marcelo von Schwartz =

Argentine film director

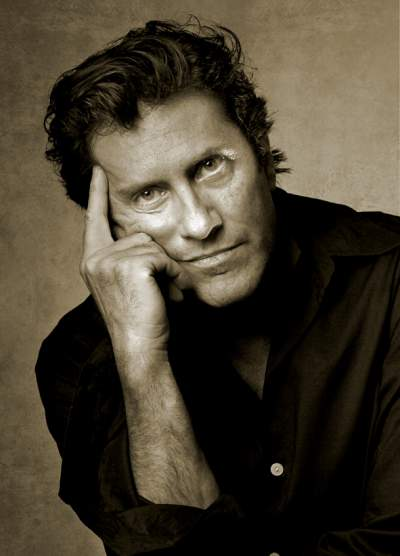
- Born: Marcelo Schvartz; August 16, 1969 (age 57); Buenos Aires, Argentina
- Education: Architecture, University of Buenos Aires
- Alma mater: Film, under David José Kohon
- Occupations: Film director, architect, photographer
- Notable work: Dark Bridge
- Style: Nonlinear narrative, neo-noir, psychological thriller, surrealist, horror

Marcelo von Schwartz (born Marcelo Schvartz; August 16, 1969) is an Argentine film director, architect, photographer and sound architect. His work is known for focusing on the dark side of things. He has worked on over 20 film/video projects, and recently released feature film Dark Bridge Binaural Brainwaves, which utilises the hypnotic qualities of binaural beats for heightened cinematic effect.

== Creative journey ==
Marcelo completed his studies at the University of Buenos Aires in architecture and went on to study filmmaking under David José Kohon, one of the most influential Argentine filmmakers and a precursor to the Argentine Nouvelle Vague of the 60s (one of the "60s generation").

In the 1990s he moved to Barcelona, where he started his career as a producer and filmmaker. After working as Art Director and Production Designer on various independent films, he wrote and produced the 35mm expressionist short film Phoenix. The film competed in over 30 festivals worldwide, winning recognition and prizes.

In 1997 he funded the production company MANIFESTO and produced documentaries, short films, music videos and video art pieces that have been screened worldwide.

In 2007 he funded Happy Ending Films, a production company for independent feature films.

In 2014 released the Binaural Brainwave version of his movie Dark Bridge, his first long feature film, entirely shot in Thailand. It is significant in being the first feature film to include a mixed Theta binaural brainwave through the entire movie's score to accentuate its hypnotic mood, opening the door to “new subconscious movie experiences” - a precursor to the new Neurocinema movement.

He has also recently made a visual collaboration with RECOIL (Alan Wilder, former keyboardist and songwriter of Depeche Mode) for the RECOIL Selected World Tour 2010.

== Style of work ==
His nightmarish and dreamlike work is highly influenced by dark artists like Francis Bacon, Otto Dix and George Grosz, and filmmakers like Fritz Lang, F.W. Murnau, Josef von Sternberg and the early Polanski among others.

== Filmography ==
- El Otro (The Other) [1987]
- ViajeNocturno (Night journey) [1988]
- Ave Fenix (Phoenix) [1996]
- Barcelona Sculptures [1997]
- GaudiMoving [1998]
- Anita Dolce Vita [2000]
- Trayectos extremos [2004]
- Carne (Meat) [2005]
- hOPENING [With P. Reig, 2005]
- Los Viajes de la Memoria [2005]
- Don’t come in [2006]
- God is Gone [2007]
- RECOIL Selected Tour 2010 [Collaboration, 2010]

== Feature films ==
- Dark Bridge [color, 90’, 2011]
- Dark Bridge Binaural Brainwaves [color, 87', 2014]
- SUAY, a TV series for HOOQ TV, Singapore [color, 2018]

== Literature ==
- Dark Cabaret [HappyEnding/Manifesto] ISBN 978-987-33-0092-9
- [Curator] Two realities, photo book by Khun Hans, 2018
