= Rufián =

Rufián may refer to:

- El Rufián, 1961 Argentine film
- Gabriel Rufián (born 1982), Spanish politician
