= Así O De Otra Manera =

1964 film

Así o de otra manera
- Directed by: David José Kohon
- Written by: David José Kohon; Carlos Latorre
- Produced by: David José Kohon
- Starring: Mario Passano
- Edited by: Vicente Castagno
- Music by: Juan Carlos Cedrón
- Release date: 1964
- Running time: 95 minutes
- Country: Argentina
- Language: Spanish

Así o de otra manera (English (roughly): One Way or Another) is a 1964 Argentine drama film directed and written by David José Kohon based on a story by Carlos Latorre.

== Cast ==
- Mario Passano
- Beatriz Barbieri
- Zulema Katz
- Mecha López
- Maurice Jouvet
- Alberto Barcel
- Raúl del Valle
- Ignacio Souto
- José María Fra
