= Pajarito Gómez =

1965 film

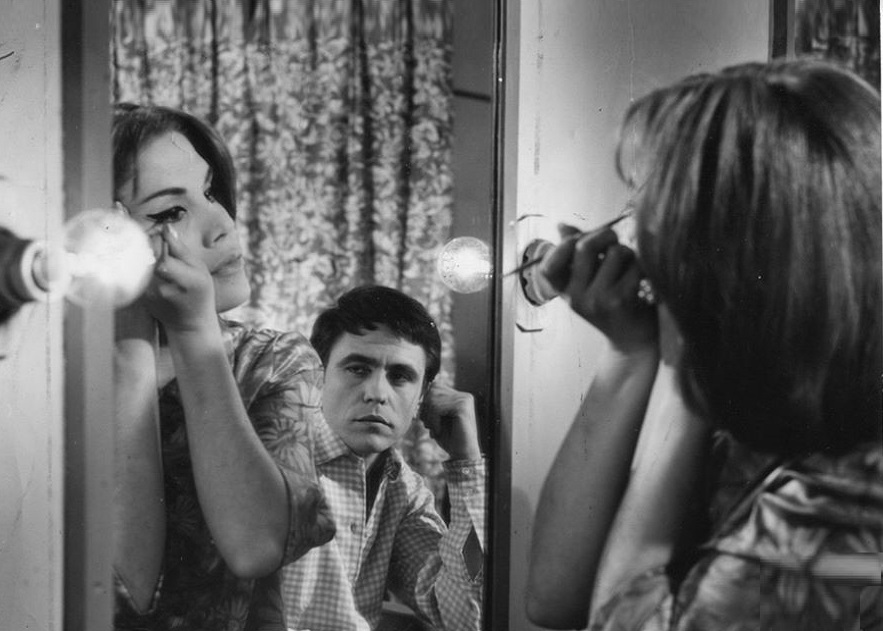
- Héctor Pellegrini and María Cristina Laurenz in a scene from the movie
- Directed by: Rodolfo Kuhn
- Written by: Rodolfo Kuhn; Carlos Del Peral; Francisco Urondo
- Produced by: José Antonio Jiménez
- Starring: Héctor Pellegrini
- Cinematography: Ignacio Souto
- Edited by: Vicente Castagno
- Release date: 5 August 1965
- Running time: 83 minutes
- Country: Argentina
- Language: Spanish

Pajarito Gómez is a 1965 Argentine comedy film directed by Rodolfo Kuhn. It was entered into the 15th Berlin International Film Festival. It was also selected as the Argentine entry for the Best Foreign Language Film at the 38th Academy Awards, but was not accepted as a nominee. The film is a satire of the promotional machine behind the Argentine pop stars of the 1960s.

In 2000, it was included in the list of The 100 Greatest Films of Argentine Cinema at number 27, after a poll conducted by the Museo del Cine Pablo Ducrós Hicken. In a new version of the survey organized in 2022 by the specialized magazines La vida util, Taipei and La tierra quema, presented at the Mar del Plata International Film Festival, the film reached the 22nd position.

== Cast ==
- Héctor Pellegrini as Pajarito Gómez
- María Cristina Laurenz as Pajarito's fiancée
- Nelly Beltrán as Rosalía
- Lautaro Murúa as Gravini
- Alberto Fernández de Rosa as Bobby
- Maurice Jouvet
- Beatriz Matar
- Jorge Rivera López
- Federico Luppi
- Marta Gam
- Alberto Barcel
- Alejandra Da Passano
- Francisco Urondo

== See also ==
- List of submissions to the 38th Academy Awards for Best Foreign Language Film
- List of Argentine submissions for the Academy Award for Best Foreign Language Film
