= Under the Same Skin =

1962 film

- Directed by: Daniel Tinayre
- Written by: Silvina Bullrich; Guy des Cars
- Starring: Mirtha Legrand
- Cinematography: Alberto Etchebehere
- Edited by: Jorge Gárate
- Release date: 19 September 1962
- Running time: 125 minutes
- Country: Argentina
- Language: Spanish

Under the Same Skin (Spanish: Bajo un mismo rostro) is a 1962 Argentine drama film directed by Daniel Tinayre. It was entered into the 12th Berlin International Film Festival.

== Cast ==
- Mirtha Legrand as Inés Després
- Silvia Legrand as Sor Elisabeth
- Jorge Mistral as Jaime Alonso
- Mecha Ortiz as Madre Superiora
- Maurice Jouvet
