= Dr. Cándido Pérez, Ladies =

Dr. Cándido Pérez, señoras
- Directed by: Emilio Vieyra
- Written by: Abel Santa Cruz
- Starring: Juan Carlos Thorry
- Release date: 1962
- Running time: 85 minute
- Country: Argentina
- Language: Spanish

Dr. Cándido Pérez, Ladies (Dr. Cándido Pérez, señoras) is a 1962 Argentine film. The film was inspiration for Mexican comedian Jorge Ortiz de Pinedo's long-running sitcom, Dr. Cándido Pérez.
