= Locos por la música =

- Release date: 1980
- Running time: 90 minute
- Country: Argentina
- Language: Spanish

Locos por la música (English: Crazy for the music) is a 1980 Argentine film directed by Enrique Dawi. It was released in 1980.

== Plot ==
A tropical music band, led by Carlos Palomino (Carlos Balá), embarks on a journey to capture the attention of record label executives. Along the way, audiences can enjoy musical performances by artists like Los Iracundos, Boney M, Bárbara y Dick, Jairo, Mathías, Silvana Di Lorenzo, Laurent Voulzy, Duo Candela, and Danny Cabuche.

== Cast ==
- Carlos Balá
- Graciela Alfano
- Raúl Rossi
- Carlos Calvo
- Santiago Bal
- Iris Láinez
- María Fernanda
- Vicente La Russa
- Tito Mendoza
- Ricardo Morán
- Boney M.
- Danny Cabuche
- Silvana Di Lorenzo
- Jairo
- Los Iracundos
- Matías
- Laurent Voulzy
- Palito Ortega
- Inés García Escariz
- Analía García Escariz
- Bárbara Bourse
- Fernando Sustaita
- Enzo Bai
- Néstor Mazzei
- Fernando Madanes
