= Blood of the Virgins =

Sangre de vírgenes
- Directed by: Emilio Vieyra
- Release date: 1967
- Running time: 72 minute
- Country: Argentina
- Language: Spanish

Blood of the Virgins (Spanish: Sangre de vírgenes) is a 1967 Argentine gothic horror film directed by Emilio Vieyra.

== Plot ==
Ofelia's wedding day is approaching and she is to be married to Eduardo. She has some pre-wedding jitters during a meeting with her lover Gustavo but decides to tie the knot anyway. On her wedding night, Gustavo shows up in their room, murders Eduardo, and proceeds to turn Ofelia into a vampire so that they can be together forever. In the present day 1960's, a group of young men and women take shelter in an abandoned lodge after their van breaks down. Soon, Ofelia appears and seduces one of the guys and meanwhile the girls go missing. It is up to the other guys to figure out what is happening and Ofelia must make a decision as to how much longer she can continue with her cursed life.

== Cast ==
- Ricardo Bauleo ... Tito Ledesma
- Susana Beltrán ... Ofelia
- Gloria Prat ... Laura
- Walter Kliche ... Gustavo
- Rolo Puente ... Raúl Aguilar
- Emilio Vieyra ... Comisario Martinez
