= Juegos de verano =

- Directed by: Juan Antonio Serna
- Written by: Juan Antonio Serna
- Music by: Waldo Belloso
- Distributed by: Sudameris
- Release date: 18 April 1973
- Running time: 90 minutes
- Country: Argentina
- Language: Spanish

Juegos de verano (Summer Games) is a 1973 Argentine erotic film directed by Juan Antonio Serna and starring Linda Peretz and Ricardo Morán.

== Plot ==
Five girls from different Latin American countries join young people in a house in Delta del Tigre. The troupe of young girls is headed by actress Linda Peretz.

== Cast ==
- Linda Peretz
- Ricardo Morán
- Irma Ferrazzi
- Hilda Blanco
- Alberto Mazzini
- Alfredo Zemma
- Alcira Moro
- Susana Maraldino
- Susana Villafañe as Narcisa
- Virginia Faiad
- Rosa Aroza
- Susana Maldy
- Xunta Malek
- Javier Luis Pressa
- Julio Sanchez Paz
- Cristian Shell

== Production ==
The film was made in 1969 but not released until 1973. It is described as a soft core porn film with lesbian scenes which was made pornographic with added scenes when released overseas. These sex scenes caused legal problems and had to be censored for the Argentine market, which significantly delayed the release of the film.

== Reception ==
La Prensa opined that "All the elements have been played with awkwardness and memorable lack of imagination". Raúl Manrupe and Maria Portela in their book Un diccionario de films argentinos (1930-1995) wrote: "Forgotten incursion of 70s erotic cinema to which some porn scenes were added for its exhibition abroad".
