= The Desire to Live =

- Directed by: Julio Saraceni
- Written by: Rodolfo M. Taboada
- Produced by: Óscar Anderle, Emilio Spitz
- Cinematography: Ricardo Younis
- Edited by: Rosalino Caterbeti
- Music by: Jorge Leone
- Release date: 5 April 1973
- Running time: 90 minutes
- Country: Argentina
- Language: Spanish

The Desire to Live (Spanish: El deseo de vivir) is a 1973 Argentine romantic musical film directed by Julio Saraceni and starring Sandro and Elena Sedova.

== Plot ==
Sandro plays Rolo Medina, a young athlete, who despite a life of luxury, pleasure and beautiful women, feels his life has no meaning. That feeling will change abruptly when he randomly meets Laura (Elena Sedova), who is the partner of a renowned physician, Dr. Mariano Fuentes (Juan José Miguez). The attraction between Rolo and Laura is immediate, and for the wealthy young athlete. seems to have given the desire to live. However, an unexpected event changes his life forever.

== Cast ==
- Sandro as Rolo
- Elena Sedova as Laura
- Juan José Míguez as Dr. Mariano Fuentes
- Miguel Bermúdez
- Ricardo Passano
- Adriana Aguirre
- Norma Sebré
- María Amelia Rodríguez
- Julio García Alemán
- Jorge Marchesini

== Music ==
Songs include:

- Pequeña mujer
- Carolina en mi piel
- Te espero bajo el sol
- El deseo de vivir
- No me dejes... No mi amor
- Diablo angelical
- Me juego entero por tu amor
