= Circe (film) =

1964 film

- Theatrical release poster
- Directed by: Manuel Antín
- Written by: Manuel Antín; Julio Cortázar; Héctor Grossi
- Based on: "Circe" by Julio Cortázar
- Produced by: Salvador Salías
- Starring: Graciela Borges; Alberto Argibay
- Cinematography: Américo Hoss
- Edited by: José Serra
- Music by: Adolfo Mo rpurgo
- Release date: 1964
- Running time: 80 minute
- Country: Argentina
- Language: Spanish

Circe is a 1964 Argentine film directed by Manuel Antín. It was entered into the 14th Berlin International Film Festival.

The film is based on a short story by Julio Cortázar, published in 1951. Its main theme is about perverse sexual gratification in a repressed Catholic environment. Delia Mañara is notorious in her quarter of Buenos Aires for the mysterious deaths of two of her fiancés. She lives in a twilight world and gains most satisfaction through the exercise of power over others. It emerges that she killed the two men by poisoning them with the sweets she makes; when this fails with her third fiancé, he is freed from her fatal attraction by the knowledge.

== Cast ==
- Graciela Borges
- Raúl Aubel
- Alberto Argibay
- Alberto Barcel
- Josefina Boneo
- Lydia Lamaison
- Juan Carlos Lima
- Víctor Martucci
- Beatriz Matar
- Sergio Renán
- Claudia Sánchez
- Walter Vidarte
