= I Want to Fill Myself With You =

Quiero llenarme de ti
- Release date: 1969
- Running time: 95 minute
- Country: Argentina
- Language: Spanish

I Want to Fill Myself With You (Quiero llenarme de ti) is a 1969 Argentine film.

== Cast ==
- Sandro as Sandro / Roberto
- Marcela López Rey as Susana
- Walter Vidarte as Raúl
- Soledad Silveyra as Ana María
- Fidel Pintos as Fidel
- Blanca del Prado as Doña Julia
- Linda Peretz as Amiga de Sandro
- Rolo Puente as Juan Manuel
- Tita Gutiérrez
- Pedro Buchardo as Don Pedro
- Trissi Bauer as "Venenito"
