= Yo también tengo fiaca =

- Directed by: Enrique Cahen Salaberry
- Written by: Ricardo Talesnik (writer)
- Produced by: Hector Bailez
- Starring: Susana Giménez and Juan Carlos Calabró
- Cinematography: Antonio Merayo
- Edited by: Jorge Gárate
- Music by: Tito Ribero
- Production company: Cinematográfica Victoria
- Release date: August 24, 1978
- Running time: 95 minutes
- Country: Argentina
- Language: Spanish

Yo también tengo fiaca (I Also Have a Hangover or I Am Also Down/in the Doldrums) is a 1978 Argentine sex comedy film directed by Enrique Cahen Salaberry. The film, produced by Hector Bailez, is based on Ricardo Talesnik's successful 1967 play of the same name and stars Susana Giménez and Juan Carlos Calabró as a middle-aged middle class couple committing infidelity.

The film premiered on August 24, 1978 in Buenos Aires, and it won the Argentores Prize in 1978. The score for the film was composed by Tito Ribero.

== Plot ==
The plot revolves around Marta and Jorge, who together with their children form a typical middle class family in the 70's. Jorge, a bank clerk, represents a stereotype. He loves his family, but he also has some macho attitudes, which in those years were not so frowned upon. He neglects to help around the house and has committed some infidelity in the past. Marta, an employee in a pharmacy, in addition to working outside also takes care of almost all the tasks of the daily routine, including housework and raising the children.

One fine day, tired physically and mentally, Marta decides to take a few days off to Mar del Plata in the middle of summer. As expected, temptations do not take long to appear, and Marta is seduced by different men. At the same time, her husband, who has been left alone in Buenos Aires, since the children have gone to spend the summer at a relatives' country house, is also tempted to spend a few days as a bachelor. Both of them, each with their own values, must decide whether or not to give in to their own temptations... but unexpected news will suddenly change the plans of each of them.

== Cast ==
- Susana Giménez as Marta Di Lorenzo
- Juan Carlos Calabró as Jorge Di Lorenzo
- Osvaldo Pacheco as Don Genaro, hotel manager
- Santiago Bal as Juan Carlos, barman in cabaret
- Nelly Beltrán as hotel manageress
- Stella Maris Lanzani as blonde passenger in hotel
- Henny Trailes as Celestina, cabaret owner
- Reina Reech as Maria Elena
- Thelma Stefani as Jorge's mistress
- Jorge Luz as Tita Merello's lover
- Delfy de Ortega as Margarita
- Diego Verdaguer as singer of "Si el amor es como dicen"
- Eloísa Cañizares as Matilde, Marta's mother
- Mónica Vehil as brunette passenger at hotel
- Graciela Cohen as passenger in bus to Mar del Plata
- Lisardo Garcia Tuñon as customer at the bank teller's office
- Claudio Corvalan as Susana's conquering beau

== Production ==
The film is an adaption of Ricardo Talesnik's play of the same name which was first staged by the ICTUS group in Santiago de Chile in September 1967, before being performed in Buenos Aires shortly afterwards. The play was a major success in Latin America and won the Argentores Prize. It was translated into several languages. According to Darrell B. Lockhardt, the film was shot in 1969 which the script adapted for the screen by Talesnik himself. The word "fiaca" is a slang term in Buenos Aires which roughly translates as meaning the "doldrums".

Yo también tengo fiaca was directed by Enrique Cahen Salaberry, working with cinematographer Antonio Merayo. The score for the film was composed by Tito Ribero and it was edited by Jorge Gárate. It was produced by Hector Bailez of the Cinematográfica Victoria studio.

== Release and reception ==
The film premiered on August 24, 1978 in Buenos Aires. Due to the nature of several of the scenes in the film it was given an over 18 certificate. It won the Argentores Prize in 1978.

La Nación wrote: "An acceptable quota of humor and fun, beyond certain touches of too thick comedy and the conventional ending." Rafael Granados in Clarín said "Armed to entertain." Manrupe and Portela write in the book Un diccionario de films argentinos (1930-1995): "Calabró's first leading role, with some funny moments that could have been more, but stay in the easy stuff."
