= The Great Adventure (1974 film) =

La Gran aventura
- Directed by: Emilio Vieyra
- Starring: Víctor Bó, Graciela Alfano and Ricardo Bauleo.
- Edited by: Atilio Rinaldi
- Production company: Aries Cinematográfica Argentina
- Distributed by: Nort Film
- Release date: 23 May 1974
- Running time: 90 minutes
- Country: Argentina
- Language: Spanish

The Great Adventure (Spanish: La Gran aventura) is a 1974 Argentine action film comedy directed by Emilio Vieyra. The film stars Víctor Bó, Graciela Alfano and Ricardo Bauleo. The film marked the end of Vieyra's contract with Pel-Mex, and start of collaboration with producers Aries Cinematográfica Argentina and other small producers. The film features a Dollars trilogy-type whistling and gun-firing score.

== Cast ==
- Graciela Alfano as Afrodita
- Ricardo Bauleo as Apolo
- Víctor Bó as Hércules
- Leonardo Bonzi
- Juan José Camero
- Florencio Alegre
- María Fernanda Cartier
- Rey Charol
- Julio De Grazia
- Noemí del Castillo
- Beto Gianola
- Alberto Golán
- Liliana Lagos
- Juan Carlos Landers
- Roberto Landers
- Stella Maris Lanzani
- Ricardo Lavié
- Maria Estela Lorca
- Gilda Lousek
- Oscar Maril
- Jorge Martínez
- Enrique Milio
- Guillermo Murray
- Arturo Noal
- Enrique Nóbili
- Ignacio Quirós
- Gigi Rua
- Dudy Sicorski
- Julieta Vertier
- Emilio Vieyra as Cameo
- Norberto Vieyra

== Reception ==
Although the director Emilio Vieyra was often criticized and his films dismissed by critics, The Great Adventure was a commercial success and considered a "blockbuster". Fernando Gabriel Varea in his 2006 book El cine argentino durante la dictadura militar, 1976/1983 described the film as a "super super adventure", "sort of cross between James Bond and the Three Stooges. The Great Adventure was also the first of several of Vieyra's films which featured fish and dolphins.
