= The Marihuana Story =

- Theatrical release poster
- Directed by: León Klimovsky
- Written by: Wilfredo Jiménez; Bernio Mason
- Produced by: Carmelo Vecchione
- Starring: Pedro López Lagar and Fanny Navarro
- Cinematography: Alberto Etchebehere
- Edited by: José Serra
- Music by: Juan Lhert and Anatole Pietri
- Release date: 27 September 1950
- Running time: 98 minutes
- Country: Argentina
- Language: Spanish

The Marihuana Story (Spanish: Marihuana) is a 1950 Argentine film directed by León Klimovsky during the classical era of Argentine cinema. It was entered into the 1951 Cannes Film Festival.

The film is about how the life of a respected surgeon progressively worsens after his wife, a marijuana addict, dies.

== Cast ==
- Pedro López Lagar – Dr. Pablo Urioste
- Fanny Navarro – Marga Quiroga
- Golde Flami – Aída
- Nathán Pinzón – Sopita
- Eduardo Cuitiño – Gang Boss
- Alberto de Mendoza – Lt. DeLuca
- Gilberto Peyret – Inspector Olivera
- Roberto Durán – Diego
- Héctor Quintanilla – Chevrolet
- Pilar Gómez – Amelia
- Angel Prio
- Cecilia Ingenieros
- Elsa Márquez
- Juan Carrara
- Jesús Pampín – Hombre en congreso
- Alberto Rinaldi
- Alberto Barcel – Dr, Piñeyro
- Warly Ceriani – Director
- Mauricio Espósito
- Leticia Lando
- Gloria Castilla
- Domingo Mania – Dr. Portal
- Juan Fava
- Adolfo Laurie
- China Navarro
- Osvaldo Cabrera
- Rafael Diserio – Dueno de boite
- Jorge Villoldo – Portero
- Alfredo Almanza

== Production ==
The relative financial success of the American exploitation film She Shoulda Said 'No'! (1949), a morality tale involving the use of marijuana, prompted producers in 1951 to import The Marihuana Story from Argentina.

== See also ==
- Cannabis in Argentina
