= What's Autumn? =

1977 film

- Directed by: Daniel Portela; David José Kohon
- Written by: Mario Diament; David José Kohon
- Produced by: Luis Giudici
- Starring: Alfredo Alcón
- Cinematography: Alberto Basail
- Edited by: Armando Blanco
- Release date: 5 May 1977
- Running time: 115 minutes
- Country: Argentina
- Language: Spanish

What's Autumn? (Spanish: ¿Qué es el otoño?, and also known as What Does Fall Mean?) is a 1977 Argentine drama film directed by Daniel Portela and David José Kohon. The film was the Argentine entry for the Best Foreign Language Film at the 50th Academy Awards, but was not accepted as a nominee.

== Cast ==
- Alfredo Alcón
- Dora Baret
- Fernanda Mistral
- Alberto Argibay
- Aldo Barbero
- Javier Portales
- Flora Steinberg
- Alicia Zanca
- Catalina Speroni
- Pepe Armil
- Roberto Mosca
- Luis Corradi

== See also ==
- List of submissions to the 50th Academy Awards for Best Foreign Language Film
- List of Argentine submissions for the Academy Award for Best Foreign Language Film
