= The Curious Dr. Humpp =

- Spanish: La venganza del sexo
- Directed by: Emilio Vieyra
- Written by: Emilio Vieyra
- Produced by: Orestes Trucco
- Starring: Ricardo Bauleo; Gloria Prat; Aldo Barbero; Susana Beltrán; Justin Martin; Miguel Ángel Olmos; Mariela Albano; Aldo Brigatti; Héctor Biuchet; Greta Williams
- Cinematography: Aníbal González Paz
- Edited by: Jacinto Cascales
- Music by: Víctor Buchino
- Production company: Productores Argentinos Asociados
- Distributed by: Forbes-Unistar (United States)
- Release dates: January 1969 (Uraguay); May 14, 1970 (United States)
- Running time: 87 minutes
- Country: Argentina
- Language: Spanish

The Curious Dr. Humpp, locally released as La venganza del sexo (Spanish for "revenge of sex"), is a 1969 Argentine sexploitation horror film written and directed by Emilio Vieyra. It focuses on a mad scientist who kidnaps people and forces them to have sex, which he views as the lifeblood of humanity, so that he can create a way for humans to attain eternal life.

== Plot ==
People engaged in sex acts — Rachel and her boyfriend, four hippies, two lesbians, and a woman with photos of naked men — are systematically kidnapped by a hideous monster and taken away by a hearse. George, a newspaper reporter, and Police Inspector Benedict investigate. A barman remembers seeing the monster at his club just before the stripper was abducted. The police sketch is published in the paper and the monster is spotted trying to buy aphrodisiacs at a pharmacy. George follows the hearse and is captured trying to break into the estate where everyone is being held.

George wakes to find himself a prisoner, too. He is befriended by Rachel, who helps him overpower Dr. Humpp's nurse. After George has sex with the nurse, she agrees to help him escape, but that may be just a ploy. Dr. Humpp's goal is to give mankind eternal life using the power of the human libido.

== Cast ==
- Ricardo Bauleo as Horacio Funes (George)
- Gloria Prat as Raquel (Rachel)
- Aldo Barbero as Dr. Zoide (Dr. Humpp)
- Susana Beltrán Enfermera (Nurse)
- Héctor Biuchet as Inspector Benedict

== Release ==
=== Home media ===
The film was released on DVD by Image Entertainment on October 3, 2000. It was later released by Odeon on May 23, 2005. In 2021 it released a new Blu-ray release under the Vinegar Syndrome partner label AGFA also known as American Genre Film Archive.

== Reception ==
Upon its 1971 release in Buenos Aires, the film was generally poorly received by local film critics. A reviewer from La Prensa found it puerile and a poor representative of Argentine cinema.

TV Guide awarded the film one out of five stars, calling the film "morbid". Dave Sindelar from Fantastic Movie Musings and Ramblings noted the film's "silly" dialogue, surreal aspects, and overuse of stock footage, stating that the film was "for the adults only crowd".
