= El Profesor erótico =

- Directed by: Rafael Cohen
- Written by: Máximo Berrondo, Rafael Cohen
- Starring: Osvaldo Pacheco, Nelly Beltran, Thelma Stefani, Beatriz Bonnet
- Cinematography: Pedro Marzialetti
- Edited by: Oscar Pariso
- Music by: Gustavo Beytelman
- Release date: 1 July 1976
- Running time: 90 minutes
- Country: Argentina
- Language: Spanish

El Profesor erótico is a 1976 Argentine film.

== Cast ==
- Osvaldo Pacheco
- Beatriz Bonnet
- Alberto Anchart Jr.
- Thelma Stefani
- Atilio Marinelli
- Susy Kent
- Linda Peretz
- Cecilia Rossetto
- Nelly Beltrán
- Vicente Rubino
- Augusto Codecá
- Carlos Rotundo
- Lelio Lesser
- Claudia Gard
- Héctor Bartolomé
- Juan Carlos Lima
- Miguel Paparelli
- Adrián Noya
