= Blue Commandos in Action =

Comandos azules en acción
- Release date: 1980
- Running time: 92 minute
- Country: Argentina
- Language: Spanish

Blue Commands in Action (Spanish: Comandos azules en acción) is an Argentine film shot in Eastmancolor, directed by Emilio Vieyra based on his own screenplay, written in collaboration with Gustavo Ghirardi, from an original idea by Emilio Vieyra. It was released on September 4, 1980, and the main actors were Jorge Martínez and Germán Kraus.

== Synopsis ==
A paramilitary group intervenes to prevent a crime in the fashion world.

== Cast ==
- Jorge Martínez …Jorge "Azul 1" / Falso José María Seres Ruiz / Modelo / Ciego
- German Kraus …Germán "Azul 2" / Mozo / Modelo
- Adriana Parets …Directora de casa de modas
- Romualdo Quiroga …El Profe
- Virginia Álvarez …Mónica / Catalina
- Carlos Muñoz …Falso científico
- Adrián "Facha" Martel …Sr. Wemsley
- Tobito Martínez
- Titi Rodríguez
- Graciela Amor
- Joaquín Piñón
- Alfredo Lepore
- Mimí Ardu
- Arturo Noal
- Anamá Ferreyra
- Paula Domínguez
- Leo Sala
- Carlos Luna
- Beatriz Salomón
- Raúl Florido
- Daniel Lemes
- Isabel Salomón
- Rolando Dumas
- Emilio Vieyra …El Jefe (cameo)
- Oscar Curet …Mozo en la fiesta (cameo)

== Comments ==
Fernando G. Varea says that "the films that exposed the Argentine military dictatorship most harshly were those aimed at children and families." S.E. in Clarín said, "The story is almost identical to the previous one... In this case, E. Vieyra, the author and director of the film, has conceived a tedious and vulgar book."

Manrupe and Portela write, "This sequel copies all the constants of the previous one."
