= Venga a bailar el rock =

- Directed by: Carlos Marcos Stevani
- Written by: Enrique Santés Morello and Julio Porter
- Starring: Eber Lobato, Alberto Anchart (h), Nélida Lobato, Pedrito Rico, Alfredo Barbieri, Amelita Vargas, Eddie Pequenino, Guillermo Brizuela Méndez
- Edited by: Claudio Bernal
- Music by: Eber Lobato, Bill Haley, Eddie Pequenino, Lalo Schifrin
- Release date: 1957
- Running time: 60 minutes
- Country: Argentina
- Language: Spanish

Venga a bailar el rock is a 1957 Argentine musical film. Is the first Ibero American film on rock and roll theme. Lalo Schifrin is one of the composers of the soundtrack, in his first movie participation.

== Cast ==
- Eber Lobato
- Alberto Anchart (h)
- Nélida Lobato
- Gran Kiki
- Delma Ricci
- Osvaldo Castro
- Pedrito Rico
- Alfredo Barbieri
- Amelita Vargas
- Eddie Pequenino
- Pablo Cumo
- Luis Frontera
- Martha Durán
- Guillermo Brizuela Méndez
- Fernando Campos
- Ricardo Becher
- Yamandú Di Paula
- Carlos Irízar
- Los Caribes
- Los Big Rocker's
- Ernesto y sus rockers
- Hermanos Fernández
