= Emilio Vieyra =

Argentine film director, actor, screenwriter and film producer (1920–2010)

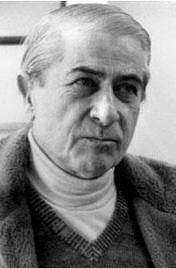
- Born: 12 October 1920; Buenos Aires, Argentina
- Died: 25 January 2010 (aged 89)
- Occupations: Film director, actor, screenwriter, film producer

Emilio Vieyra (12 October 1920 – 25 January 2010), sometimes credited as Raúl Zorrilla, was an Argentine film director, actor, screenwriter and film producer, between 1950 and the 1990s. He was born in Buenos Aires, Argentina. He is mostly known for his action and horror films, which were usually grounded in the exploitation genre.

Vieyra began as an actor in 1950 in the film Hombres a precio and appeared in Ayer fue primavera in 1955. He began a career as a film director in 1962, with the comedy Dr. Cándido Pérez, señoras, and is most credited in this area of Argentine cinema. As both actor and director he appeared in the science fiction film Extraña invasión (1965), the Gothic horror film Sangre de vírgenes (1967), the horror film La Bestia desnuda (1971), the action film La Gran aventura (1974), the comedy Ángel, la Diva y Yo (1999) and the drama Cargo de conciencia (2005), which was his last acting role and last film. Shortly after he retired from filmmaking and died in 2010, aged 89.

== Filmography ==
=== As director ===
- Dr. Cándido Pérez, señoras (1962)
- Detrás de la mentira (1962)
- La fin del mundo (1963)
- Testigo para un crimen (1963)
- María M. (1964)
- Extraña invasión (1965)
- Dos quijotes sobre ruedas (1966)
- Placer sangriento (1967)
- La bestia desnuda (1967)
- Sangre de vírgenes (1967)
- Villa Cariño está que arde (1968)
- La venganza del sexo (1969)
- Quiero llenarme de ti (1969)
- La vida continúa (1969)
- Gitano (1970)
- Los mochileros (1970)
- Así es Buenos Aires (1971)
- Simplemente una rosa (1971)
- Yo gané el prode... y Ud.? (1973)
- La gran aventura (1974)
- Los irrompibles (1975)
- Comandos azules (1980)
- Comandos azules en acción (1980)
- El poder de la censura (1983)
- Todo o nada (1984)
- Sucedió en el internado (1985)
- Correccional de mujeres (1986)
- Obsesión de venganza (1987)
- La clínica loca (1988)
- Maestro de pala (1993)
- Adiós, abuelo (1996)
- Cargo de conciencia (2005)

Screenwriter

- Extraña invasión (1965)
- Placer sangriento (1967)
- La bestia desnuda (1967)
- Villa Cariño está que arde (1968)
- La venganza del sexo (1971)
- Sangre de vírgenes (1974)
- Los irrompibles (1975)
- Comandos azules (1980)
- Comandos azules en acción (1980)
- El poder de la censura (1983)
- Todo o nada (1984)
- Correccional de mujeres (1986)
- Obsesión de venganza (1987)
- Tómame (inédita - 1992)
- Adiós, abuelo (1996)
- Cargo de conciencia (2005)

Actor

- Hombres a precio (1950)
- Valentina (1950)
- Mi marido hoy duerme en casa (1955)
- De noche también se duerme (1955)
- Ayer fue primavera (1955)
- El tango en París (1956)
- Extraña invasión (1965)
- Placer sangriento (1967)
- La bestia desnuda (1971)
- La gran aventura (1974) (Cameo)
- Sangre de vírgenes (1974)
- Comandos azules en acción (1980)
- Terror en el cine argentino (1996)
- Argentina bizarra (1997)
- Ángel, la diva y yo (1999)

Producer

- Quinto año nacional (1961)
- La venganza del sexo (1971)
- Comandos azules (1980)
