= La Noche del hurto =

- Directed by: Hugo Sofovich
- Written by: Hugo Sofovich
- Edited by: Jorge Gárate
- Music by: Palito Ortega
- Release date: 1976
- Running time: 93 minute
- Country: Argentina
- Language: Spanish

La Noche del hurto is a 1976 Argentine comedy film directed by Hugo Sofovich.

== Cast ==
- Ricardo Espalter ... Cacho Fortirolo
- Javier Portales ... Cholo
- Ethel Rojo ... Señora erótica
- Cecilia Rossetto ... Juana Fortirolo
- Raimundo Soto ... Raimundo
- Mario Sánchez ... Carmelo
