= The Escaped =

1964 film

- Directed by: Enrique Carreras
- Written by: Sixto Pondal Ríos
- Starring: Jorge Salcedo
- Cinematography: Antonio Merayo
- Edited by: Jorge Gárate
- Release date: 14 May 1964
- Running time: 97 minutes
- Country: Argentina
- Language: Spanish

The Escaped (Spanish: Los evadidos) is a 1964 Argentine drama film directed by Enrique Carreras. It won the Silver Condor Award for Best Film and was entered into the 14th Berlin International Film Festival.

== Cast ==
- Juan Carlos Altavista
- Alberto Barcel as Médico
- Guillermo Battaglia
- Tita Merello
- Mario Passano
- Sergio Renán
- Carlos Rivas as Locutor de TV
- Jorge Salcedo
- Walter Vidarte
