= List of Argentine films of 1982 =

A list of films produced in Argentina in 1982. In 1982 the Falklands War meant film production was lower than usual:

Argentine films of 1982
Title	Director	Release	Genre
A - Z
El agujero en la pared	David José Kohon	3 June	Drama
Las aventuras de los Parchís	Adrián Quiroga	15 June	
La casa de las siete tumbas	Pedro Stocki	25 March	
Desafío al coraje	Julio Garven	16 April	
Fiebre amarilla	Javier Torre	18 March	History
Los Fierecillos indomables	Enrique Carreras	15 July	
Inti Anti, camino al sol	Juan Schröder	7 October	
La invitación	Manuel Antín	30 September	
J - Z
Mafalda	Carlos Márquez	3 December	Animated
La magia de Los Parchís	Adrián Quiroga	7 January	
Los pasajeros del jardín	Alejandro Doria	20 May	Drama
Plata dulce	Fernando Ayala	8 July	comedy
Prima Rock	Osvaldo Andéchaga	2 December	Musical
Pubis angelical	Raúl de la Torre	12 August	Drama
Señora de Nadie	María Luisa Bemberg	1 April	Drama
¿Somos?	Carlos Hugo Christensen	2 September	
Un terceto peculiar	Hugo Sofovich	4 March	Comedia
Últimos días de la víctima	Adolfo Aristarain	8 April	Thriller
Volver	David Lipszyc	5 August	

== External links and references ==
- Argentine films of 1982 at the Internet Movie Database
