= Un Lugar al sol =

- Directed by: Dino Minitti
- Written by: Agustín Mahieu; Dino Minitti
- Starring: María Cristina Laurenz; Héctor Pellegrini
- Cinematography: Ignacio Souto
- Music by: César Jaimes
- Release date: 1965
- Running time: 80 minute
- Country: Argentina
- Language: Spanish

Un Lugar al sol is a 1965 Argentine film.

== Cast ==
- María Cristina Laurenz
- Héctor Pellegrini
- Lola Palombo
- Jorge Villalba
- Orlando Bor
