= The Return of Martín Fierro =

The Return of Martin Fierro
- Spanish: La Vuelta de Martín Fierro
- Directed by: Enrique Dawi
- Written by: Enrique Dawi (adapted from José Hernández)
- Starring: Enrique Alonso; Hugo Arana; Enzo Bai
- Cinematography: Aníbal González Paz
- Edited by: Jorge Gárate
- Release date: 1974
- Running time: 100 minute
- Country: Argentina
- Language: Spanish

The Return of Martin Fierro (Spanish: La Vuelta de Martín Fierro) is a 1974 Argentine film directed by Enrique Dawi and based on the second part of the poem Martín Fierro by José Hernández.

Conductor Pedro Ignacio Calderón contributed to the film.

== Cast ==
- Enrique Alonso
- Hugo Arana
- Enzo Bai
- Aldo Calzetta
- Marta Cerain
- Raúl Fraire
