= Walter Vidarte =

Uruguayan actor

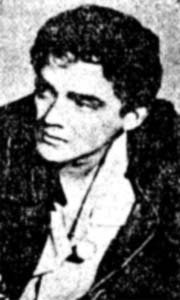
- Walter Vidarte in 1958.
- Born: 18 July 1931; Montevideo, Uruguay
- Died: 29 October 2011 (aged 80); Madrid, Spain
- Occupation: Actor
- Years active: 1958–2011

Walter Vidarte (18 July 1931 – 29 October 2011) was a Uruguayan actor.

== Biography ==
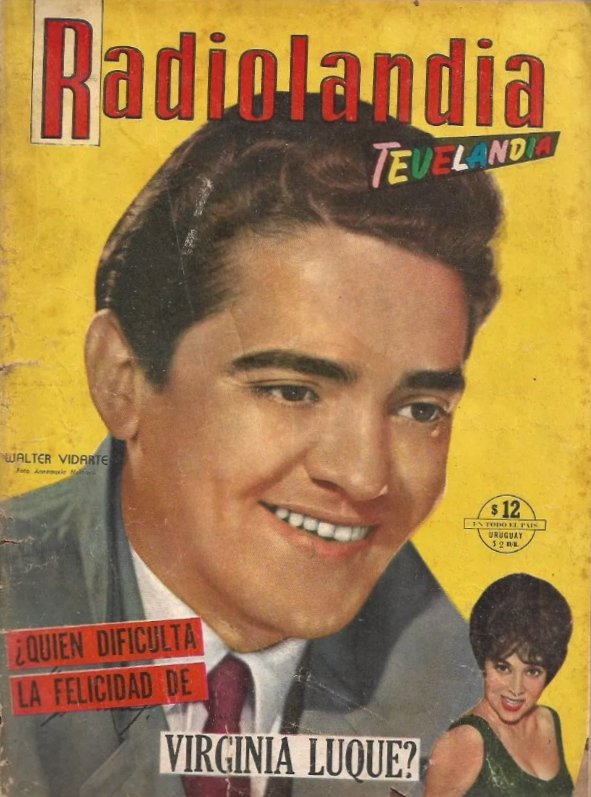
Walter Vidarte by Annemarie Heinrich, 1963

He appeared in 83 films and television shows between 1958 and 2011. He starred in the film Circe, which was entered into the 14th Berlin International Film Festival.

He died in Madrid on 29 October 2011, after suffering from pancreatic cancer. His remains were incinerated at Cementerio de la Almudena.

== Selected filmography ==
- Procesado 1040 (1958)
- Alias Gardelito (1961)
- The Romance of a Gaucho (1961)
- The Venerable Ones (1962)
- Circe (1964)
- The Escaped (1964)
- El dependiente (1969)
- Santos Vega (1971)
- The Truce (1974)
- Akelarre (1984)
- The Night of the Sunflowers (2006)
