= María Cristina Laurenz =

Argentine actress and singer

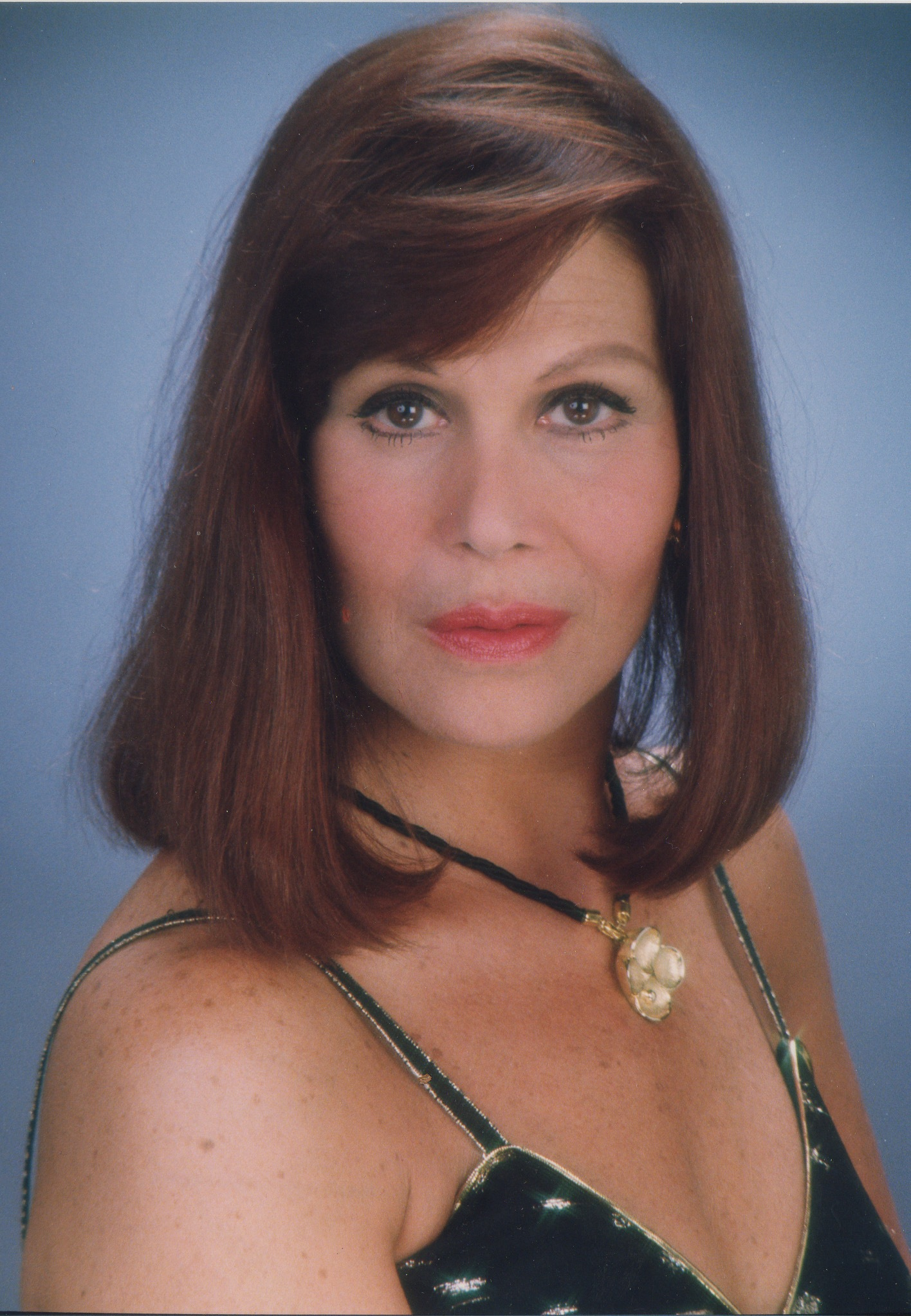
- Born: 1940 (age 85–86); Buenos Aires, Argentina
- Years active: 1960- 1994

María Cristina Laurenz (born 1940) is a retired Argentine actress and singer active between 1960 and 1994. She is the daughter of Tango musician Pedro Laurenz.

She starred in Adiós Roberto in 1985 retiring in 1994.

== Filmography ==
- Día que me quieras, El (1994) TV Series .... Rosario
- Elegida, La (1992) TV Series .... Gloria
- Adiós, Roberto (1985)
- Minguito Tinguitela, papá (1974)
- Picnic de los Campanelli, El (1972)
- Veraneo de los Campanelli, El (1971)
- "Campanelli, Los" (1969) TV Series
- Encuentro, El (1966/II)
- Máscaras en otoño (1966)
- Lugar al sol, Un (1965)
- Pajarito Gómez (1964) .... The Girl
- Los de la mesa 10 (1960)
- La patota (1960) .... Mujer en fiesta de graduación
