= With Life and Soul =

Con alma y vida
- Poster
- Directed by: David José Kohon
- Written by: Norberto Aroldi, David José Kohon
- Produced by: Alberto De Maio
- Cinematography: Aníbal González Paz
- Edited by: Enrique Muzio, Antonio Ripoll
- Music by: Ástor Piazzolla
- Release date: 1 October 1970
- Running time: 115 minutes
- Country: Argentina
- Language: Spanish

Con alma y vida (With Life and Soul) is a 1970 Argentine film noir directed and written by David José Kohon and Norberto Aroldi and with music by Ástor Piazzolla.

The film received a positive review in La Gaceta and was awarded the 1971 Silver Condor Award for Best Director from the Argentinean Film Critics Association.

== Cast ==
- María Aurelia Bisutti
- Norberto Aroldi
- José María Langlais
- David Llewelyn
- Roberto Escalada
- Roberto Airaldi
- Beba Bidart
- Nora Cullen
- Francisco de Paula
- Nené Morales
- Alberto Mazzini
- Héctor Gance
- María Armand
- Luis Orbegozo
- Pajarito Zaguri
- Jorge Anselmi
