= Aníbal González Paz =

Argentine cinematographer and photographer

Aníbal González Paz with Olga Zubarry during the shooting of The Naked Angel (1946) in Rio de Janeiro.

Aníbal González Paz (died 16 January 1991, Buenos Aires) was a prolific Argentine cinematographer and photographer.

Paz photographed almost 75 major films in Argentina between 1947 and 1966 including the 1954 film The Grandfather which starred actors such as Enrique Muino and Mecha Ortiz.

He died in 1991 in Buenos Aires.

== Partial filmography ==
- The Black Vampire (1953)
- The Age of Love (1954)
- The Grandfather (1954)
- Graciela (1956)
- The House of the Angel (1957)
- Rosaura at 10 O'Clock (1958)
- Un centavo de mujer (1958)
- Three Loves in Rio (1959)
- The Romance of a Gaucho (1961)
- Paper Boats (1963)
- Extraña invasión (1965)
- The Curious Dr. Humpp (1969)
- With Life and Soul (1970)
- Bajo el signo de la patria (1971)
- La Vuelta de Martín Fierro (1974)
- La Madre María (1974)
- Beyond the Sun (1975)
