= La maestra enamorada =

- Release date: 1961
- Running time: 100 minute
- Country: Argentina
- Language: Spanish

La Maestra Enamorada is a 1961 Argentine film about a teacher who tries to save a school that is in danger of demolition.

== Cast ==
- Lolita Torres....María Elena Sánchez
- Alejandro Rey....Raúl Ledesma, an engineer
- Marcos Zucker....Ricardo Pereira
- Héctor Calcaño....minister of Educación
- Laura Hernández....minister's wife
- María del Pilar Lebrón....mother of María Elena
- María Armand....Aurelia
- Eloísa Cañizares....bursar
- Mateo Martínez
- Aldo Braga....builder employee
- Ricardo de Rosas
- Ridi Da Silva
- Julián R. Ros
- Sandra Castel
- Antonio Reales
