= Marcos Zucker =

Argentine actor and comedian

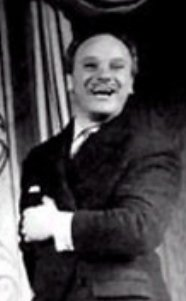
- Born: February 15, 1921; Buenos Aires, Argentina
- Died: May 13, 2003 (aged 82); Buenos Aires, Argentina
- Occupation: Actor
- Children: 3

Marcos Zucker (15 February 1921 – 13 May 2003) was an Argentine actor and comedian, known for his work on stage, on television, and in films, he is best known for his comedic roles and appeared in 66 films.

== Biography ==
Marcos Zucker was born into a Polish-Jewish family who immigrated to the country at the beginning of the 20th century during the great European emigration. He was born and raised in the neighborhood of Balvanera (Abasto), Buenos Aires.

Started his acting career as a dramatic actor but gradually switched to comedy. He worked in several successful comedy programs on television from the 1960s to the 1990s, especially in the acclaimed comedy-skit La Tuerca.

He also acted in several movies and in theatre in Argentina and Chile where he worked for seven seasons doing Fiddler on the Roof.

During the military dictatorship called the National Reorganization Process (1976–1983) one of his sons, Ricardo Marcos was abducted by security forces, becoming a disappeared.

Zucker died of a heart attack on 13 May 2003 and was buried in the actors pantheon at Chacarita Cemetery in Buenos Aires.

== Filmography ==
1. India Pravile (2003) - Friend in the bar
2. Trapo viejo (2003)
3. NS/NC (2001) -the Grandfather
4. Gallito ciego (2000) -Pensioner
5. Ángel, la diva y yo (1999) -Pereyra
6. El mar de Lucas (1999) -Man of the Wisterias
7. Vendado y frío (never released - 1999) -Matías
8. El verso (1995) -Rumanian men
9. Delito de corrupción (1991) -Men who found a corpse
10. Los insomnes (1984)
11. Un loco en acción (1983) -Boss
12. Diablito de barrio (1983)
13. Más allá de la aventura (1980)
14. Gran valor (1980) -Rusestein
15. Tiro al aire (1980)
16. Departamento compartido (1980)
17. Así no hay cama que aguante (1980)
18. Hotel de señoritas (1979)
19. El divorcio está de moda (de común acuerdo) (1978) -Caetano
20. Don Carmelo Il Capo (1976) -Drunk in a bar
21. La isla de los dibujos (1976)
22. Mi novia el... (1975)
23. Seguro de castidad (1974)
24. Los caballeros de la cama redonda (1973)
25. Vení conmigo (1972)
26. Todos los pecados del mundo (1972)
27. Siempre te amaré (1971)
28. Turismo de carretera (1968)
29. Crimen sin olvido ( 1968)
30. Flor de piolas (1967)
31. Hotel alojamiento (1966)
32. La gran felicidad (1966)
33. Convención de vagabundos (1965)
34. Viaje de una noche de verano (1965)
35. La cigarra no es un bicho (1963)
36. El rufián (1961) -Recién casado
37. La maestra enamorada (1961)
38. Vacaciones en la Argentina (1960)
39. El crack (1960)
40. Violencia en la ciudad (1957)
41. El sonámbulo que quería dormir (1956)
42. Amor a primera vista (1956)
43. Canario rojo (1955)
44. Su seguro servidor (1954)
45. Soy del tiempo de Gardel (1954)
46. ¡Qué noche de casamiento! (1953)
47. Las tres claves (1953) -Félix
48. El mucamo de la niña (1951)
49. La pícara cenicienta (1951)
50. ¡Qué hermanita! (1951)
51. Rhythm, Salt and Pepper (1951)
52. Escuela de campeones (1950)
53. Mary tuvo la culpa (1950)
54. Otra cosa es con guitarra (1949)
55. Yo no elegí mi vida (1949) -Stowaway
56. La otra y yo (1949)
57. El barco sale a las diez (1948)
58. Estrellita (1947)
59. Lucrezia Borgia (1947)
60. Corazón (1947)
61. Se rematan ilusiones (1944)
62. Los hijos artificiales (1943)
63. Juvenilia (1943)
64. Nosotros... los muchachos (1940)
65. Héroes sin fama (1940)
66. El Casamiento de Chichilo (1938)
