= Mañana puedo morir =

- Country of origin: Argentina
- Original language: Spanish

Original release
- Release: 1979 – 1979

Mañana puedo morir is a 1979 Argentine television miniseries.
