= The Campanelli's Picnic =

1972 film by Enrique Carreras

El Picnic de los Campanelli
- Directed by: Enrique Carreras
- Written by: Jorge Basurto; Juan Carlos Mesa; Oscar Viale
- Cinematography: Antonio Merayo
- Edited by: Jorge Gárate
- Release date: 13 July 1972 (Argentina)
- Running time: 78 minutes
- Country: Argentina
- Language: Spanish

The Campanelli's Picnic (El Picnic de los Campanelli) is a 1972 Argentine film directed by Enrique Carreras.

== Cast ==
- Adriana Aguirre
