= Edmundo (footballer, born 1999) =

Brazilian footballer

Personal information
- Full name: Edmundo Appolinario
- Date of birth: 19 March 1999 (age 27)
- Place of birth: Piracicaba, Brazil
- Height: 1.78 m (5 ft 10 in)
- Position: Midfielder

Team information
- Current team: Al-Hamriyah
- Number: 88

Youth career
- 2016–2019: XV de Piracicaba

Senior career*
| Years | Team | Apps | (Gls) |
| 2019 | XV de Piracicaba | 0 | (0) |
| 2019 | → Andradina (loan) | 6 | (0) |
| 2020–2021 | Bangu | 9 | (0) |
| 2021 | Nacional de Muriaé | 14 | (0) |
| 2022 | Lemense | 12 | (0) |
| 2023 | Goianésia | 11 | (0) |
| 2023 | Treze | 6 | (1) |
| 2023 | Goiatuba | 13 | (3) |
| 2024 | Treze | 11 | (2) |
| 2024 | Botafogo-PB | 20 | (3) |
| 2024–2025 | Dibba | | |
| 2025– | Al-Hamriyah | | |
- * Club domestic league appearances and goals as of 14:45, 15 June 2024 (UTC)

Edmundo Appolinario (born 19 March 1999), simply known as Edmundo, is a Brazilian footballer who plays as a midfielder for Al-Hamriyah.

== Club career ==
Born in Piracicaba, São Paulo, Edmundo began his career with hometown side XV de Piracicaba, but made his senior debut on loan with Andradina in 2019. In September 2020, he signed for Bangu.

In December 2021, after a short period at Nacional de Muriaé, Edmundo was announced at Lemense. Regularly used, but mainly as a substitute, he renewed his contract for the Copa Paulista in May 2022.

On 7 December 2022, Edmundo was announced at Goianésia. He moved to Treze the following 21 February, but later helped Goiatuba to win the 2023 Campeonato Goiano Segunda Divisão before confirming his return to Treze on 24 October.

On 15 April 2024, Edmundo joined Série C side Botafogo-PB.

== Personal life ==
Edmundo's father Reinaldo was also a footballer and a midfielder. He notably represented São Paulo.

== Career statistics ==
As of 15 June 2024

| Club | Season | League | | | State League | | Cup | | Continental | | Other | | Total | |
| Club | Season | Division | Apps | Goals | Apps | Goals | Apps | Goals | Apps | Goals | Apps | Goals | Apps | Goals |
|---|---|---|---|---|---|---|---|---|---|---|---|---|---|---|
| Andradina | 2019 | Paulista 2ª Divisão | — | | 6 | 0 | — | | — | | — | | 6 | 0 |
| Bangu | 2020 | Série D | 2 | 0 | — | | — | | — | | — | | 2 | 0 |
| Bangu | 2021 | Série D | 0 | 0 | 7 | 0 | — | | — | | — | | 7 | 0 |
| Bangu | Total | | 2 | 0 | 7 | 0 | — | | — | | — | | 9 | 0 |
| Nacional de Muriaé | 2021 | Mineiro Módulo II | — | | 14 | 0 | — | | — | | — | | 14 | 0 |
| Lemense | 2022 | Paulista A2 | — | | 12 | 0 | — | | — | | 10 (Note: Appearance(s) in Copa Paulista) | 0 | 22 | 0 |
| Goianésia | 2023 | Goiano | — | | 11 | 0 | — | | — | | — | | 11 | 0 |
| Treze | 2023 | Paraibano | — | | 6 | 1 | — | | — | | — | | 6 | 1 |
| Goiatuba | 2023 | Goiano 2ª Divisão | — | | 13 | 3 | — | | — | | — | | 13 | 3 |
| Treze | 2024 | Série D | 0 | 0 | 11 | 2 | 1 | 0 | — | | 7 (Note: Appearance(s) in Copa do Nordeste) | 1 | 19 | 3 |
| Botafogo-PB | 2024 | Série C | 7 | 3 | — | | — | | — | | — | | 7 | 3 |
| Career total | | | 9 | 3 | 80 | 6 | 1 | 0 | 0 | 0 | 17 | 1 | 112 | 10 |

== Honours ==
Treze

- Campeonato Paraibano: 2023

Goiatuba

- Goiano Segunda Divisão: 2023
