= Operation Pink Rose =

Operación rosa rosa
- Poster
- Directed by: Leo Fleider
- Starring: Sandro
- Release date: 1974
- Running time: 105 minute
- Country: Argentina
- Language: Spanish

Operación rosa rosa (English: Operation Pink Rose) is a 1974 Argentine film, directed by Polish-born director Leo Fleider. The film was written by, and starred, the singer Sandro de América.

== Cast ==
- Sandro
- Laura Bove
- Luis Tasca
- Ricardo Morán
- Carlos Muñoz
- Luis Orbegoso
- Alberto Golán
- Ricardo Golán
- Fernando Tacholas Iglesias
- Carlos Bianquet
- Graciela Nilson
