= Louvet =

The name Louvet appearing on its own usually refers to Jean-Baptiste Louvet de Couvray (1760–1797), French writer during the Revolution. Others bearing the same family name include:

- Jean Louvet (c. 1370 – c. 1440), French politician
- Jean Louvet (playwright) (1934–2015), Belgian playwright
- Louis Louvet (1899–1971), French tram driver, proofreader, anarcho-syndicalist activist and anarchist
- Patrice Louvet (born 1964), French American business executive
