= Ricardo Morán (actor) =

Argentine actor

Ricardo Morán (25 May 1941 – 3 June 2015) was an Argentine actor from Buenos Aires.

== Selected filmography ==
- La Colimba no es la guerra (1972)
- Mi amigo Luis (1972)
- Mi hijo Ceferino Namuncurá (1972)
- Hoy le toca a mi mujer (1973)
- Juegos de verano (1973)
- Crimen en el hotel alojamiento (1974)
- Operación rosa rosa (1974)
- Yo tengo fe (1974)
- No hay que aflojarle a la vida (1975)
- Brigada en acción (1977)
- Expertos en Pinchazos (1979)
- Locos por la música (1980)

Television

- Los Simuladores
- Married... with Children (Spanish version)
