= En el gran circo =

- Release date: 1974
- Running time: 85 minute
- Country: Argentina
- Language: Spanish

En el gran circo is a 1974 Argentine film.

== Cast ==
- Ismael Echeverría …Rufino Mangiapane
- Laura Bove …Alicia
- Víctor Hugo Vieyra …Aníbal
- Dolores De Cicco
- Nelly Beltrán …Encarnación, madrina
- Maurice Jouvet …Molina
- Pepita Muñoz
- Marcelo José
- Ovidio Fuentes …Pedro Antúnez, chofer
- Víctor Fassari
- Ernesto Juliano
