= Sandro de América =

Argentine singer and actor

Sandro
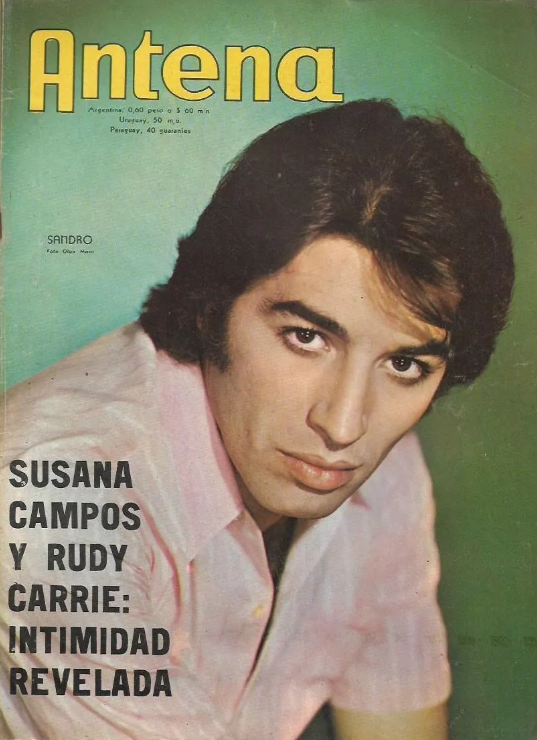
- Sandro in 1970
- Born: Roberto Sánchez-Ocampo; 19 August 1945; Buenos Aires, Argentina
- Died: 5 January 2010 (aged 64); Mendoza, Argentina
- Other names: Sandro; Sandro de América; Gitano El Paolo
- Musical career
- Genres: Rock and roll; Latin pop; canción melódica
- Occupations: Singer; musician; actor
- Instruments: Vocals; guitar; piano
- Years active: 1960–2010
- Label: CBS

Roberto Sánchez-Ocampo (August 19, 1945 – January 5, 2010), better known by his stage names Sandro or Sandro de América, was an Argentine singer and actor. He is considered a pioneer of Argentine rock for being one of the first rock artists to sing in Spanish in Latin America. He released 52 official records and sold eight million copies although other sources state that he sold over 10 million. Some of his most successful songs are "Dame fuego", "Rosa, Rosa", "Quiero llenarme de ti", "Penumbras", "Porque yo te amo", "Así", "Mi amigo el Puma", "Tengo", "Trigal", and "Una muchacha y una guitarra". The single "Rosa, Rosa" sold two million copies, being his most recognizable and famous song. Another of his hits, "Tengo" was given 15th place among the 100 best Argentine rock songs by both MTV and Rolling Stone magazine. In Latin America he was often compared to Elvis Presley at the height of his popularity.

Sandro was also the first Latin American artist to sing at the Felt Forum at Madison Square Garden. In 2005, Sandro received the Latin Grammy Lifetime Achievement Award.

== Biography ==
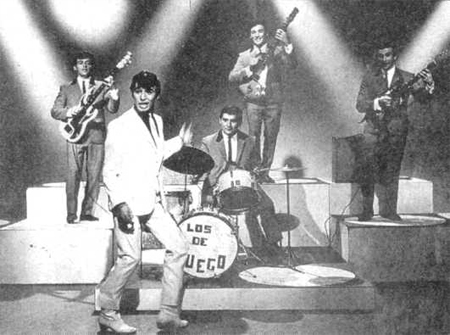
Sandro performing with Los de Fuego in 1963

Sandro was born in Buenos Aires to Irma Nydia Ocampo and Vicente Sánchez in 1945. He was raised in the southern suburb of Valentín Alsina, and learned to play the guitar as a child, identifying his music as Romani. His paternal grandfather was a Russian Rom from Hungary – Roma are known in Argentina as Gitanos (Gypsies).

Initially, in his schooldays, he imitated Elvis Presley, but went on to create a personal style that marked his career and became a pioneer in Spanish-language rock music. On November 10, 1971, he finally was able to see Presley live, at the Boston Garden, during a tour he did of that city. In 1961, he started the musical group Sandro & los de Fuego, which gained popularity on the TV show Sábados Circulares, and became widely known in the 1960s. With songs such as "Ave de Paso", "Atmósfera Pesada", "Quiero Llenarme de Ti", "Tengo", "¿A esto le llamas amor?", "Eres el demonio disfrazado" (cover of "(You're the) Devil in Disguise"), "Porque yo te amo", "Penumbras", "Una muchacha y una guitarra", "Trigal" or "Rosa, Rosa", success of his career kept growing steadily.

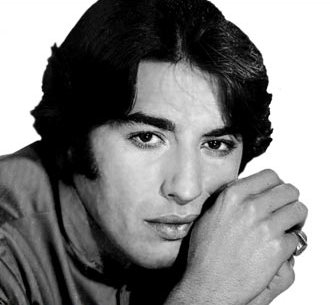
Sandro on the cover of Sandro de América, 1969

Sandro also had the leading role in 11 films, including Quiero llenarme de ti ("I Want to Fill Myself with You" – 1969) and Subí que te llevo ("Hop On, I'll Give You a Ride" – 1980), and directed one feature, Tú me enloqueces ("You Drive Me Crazy"), in 1976. His co-star in the latter film, Argentine actress Susana Giménez, was offered a TV variety show after he refused to host it; Giménez's show, named Hola Susana, would become a ratings leader shortly after its 1987 launch.

He also starred in two soap operas, notably Fue sin Querer ("I Didn't Mean To"), with Puerto Rican actress Gladys Rodríguez.

Sandro was the first Latino singer to sell out the Felt Forum at Madison Square Garden in New York City (its top capacity being 5,000) five times during the 1970s. He also appeared a couple of times on The Ed Sullivan Show, as well as with Domenico Modugno, The Doors and many others.

Sandro's songs have been recorded by international artists such as Shirley Bassey, Liza Minnelli, Burt Bacharach, Dalida, Shirley MacLaine, Toto Cutugno, Nancy Wilson, Mary Hopkin, Loredana Bertè, Umberto Tozzi, Gilbert Bécaud, Milva, Julio Iglesias, José Luis Rodríguez and Engelbert Humperdinck.

Argentine and other Latin American artists released an album in 1990 called Padre del rock en castellano ("Father of Spanish Rock") in his honor. Sandro continued releasing studio albums in the early 1990s and reappeared on stage in 1993 with a new show, that was presented at Teatro Gran Rex, a prestigious popular music venue in Buenos Aires, performing 18 attendance-record-breaking consecutive concerts. The news that he suffered from emphysema was made public in 1998, causing a great generalized concern among his followers from around the world. Sandro had been a self declared longtime cigarette smoking addict, which undoubtedly was the main cause of the disease.

== Health and death ==
On November 20, 2009, Sandro received a heart–lung transplant in Mendoza, Argentina; the operation was a success. Five days later, in a daily press conference held by his doctors, it was reported that Sandro, although still in intensive care, was breathing without a respirator and that he had started a slow recovery. Nevertheless, on the evening of January 4, 2010, 45 days after receiving the transplant and after many complications, he died of septic shock, mesenteric ischemia, and disseminated intravascular coagulation in the Hospital Italiano of Mendoza.

== Discography ==
- Sandro y los de Fuego (1965)
- Al calor de Sandro y los de Fuego (1965)
- El sorprendente mundo de Sandro (1966)
- Alma y fuego (1966)
- Beat latino (1967)
- Quiero llenarme de ti (vibración y ritmo) (1968)
- Una muchacha y una guitarra (1968)
- La magia de Sandro (1969)
- Sandro de América (1969)
- Sandro (1969)
- Muchacho (1970)
- Sandro en New York (1970)
- Sandro espectacular (1971)
- Te espero... Sandro (1972)
- Sandro después de 10 años (1973)
- Sandro siempre Sandro (1974)
- Tú me enloqueces (1975)
- Sandro live in Puerto Rico(1975)
- Sandro (1976)
- Sandro un ídolo (1977)
- Querer como Dios manda (1978)
- Sandro (1979)
- Sandro (1981)
- Fue sin querer (1982)
- Vengo a ocupar mi lugar (1984)
- Sandro (1986)
- Sandro del '88 (1988)
- Volviendo a casa (1990)
- Con gusto a mujer (1992)
- Clásico (1994)
- Historia viva (1996)
- Para mamá (2001)
- Mi vida, mi música (2003)
- Amor gitano (2004)
- Secretamente palabras de amor (para escuchar en penumbras) (2006)
- Sandro hits (2009)

== Filmography ==
- Convención de vagabundos (1965)
- Tacuara y Chamarro, pichones de hombre (1967)
- Quiero llenarme de ti (1969)
- La vida continúa (1969)
- Gitano (1970)
- Muchacho (1970)
- Siempre te amaré (1971)
- Embrujo de amor (1971)
- Destino de un capricho (1972)
- El deseo de vivir (1973)
- Operación rosa rosa (1974)
- Tú me enloqueces (1976)
- Subí que te llevo (1980)
- Fue sin querer (1980)

== See also ==
- List of best-selling Latin music artists
