= Alias Big Shot =

1961 film

- DVD cover
- Directed by: Lautaro Murúa
- Written by: Bernardo Kordon; Augusto Roa Bastos
- Produced by: Leo Kanaf
- Starring: Alberto Argibay; Walter Vidarte; Virginia Lago
- Cinematography: Oscar Melli
- Edited by: Vicente Castagno
- Music by: Waldo de los Ríos
- Distributed by: Rio Negro Productions
- Release date: 1961
- Running time: 90 minutes
- Country: Argentina
- Language: Spanish

Alias Big Shot (Spanish: Alias Gardelito) is a 1961 Argentine drama film directed by Lautaro Murúa and written by Augusto Roa Bastos and Bernardo Kordon. The film starred Alberto Argibay, Virginia Lago and Walter Vidarte. It won the Silver Condor Award for Best Picture.

In a survey of the 100 greatest films of Argentine cinema carried out by the Museo del Cine Pablo Ducrós Hicken in 2000, the film reached the 19th position.

== Synopsis ==
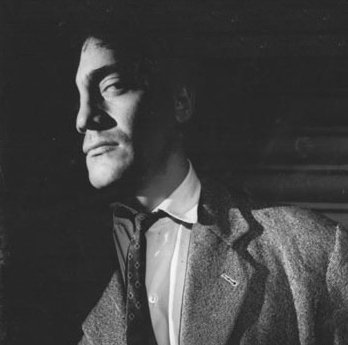
Walter Vidarte in Alias Gardelito (1961)

The drama directed by Lautaro Murua is about the difficulty of living an honest life in the face of an unrelenting poverty. The title of this story is taken from the name of the great Argentine singer Carlos Gardel, the idol of the antihero Toribio portrayed by Alberto Argibay. Toribio's goal in life is to emulate the famous singer and making his own way successfully in the music business. Yet at the same time, he does not stop his illegal means of making ends meet, stealing and petty thievery. Discouraged when his big break never quite materializes, Toribio heads for disaster when he joins up with a large smuggling scheme.

== Cast ==
- Alberto Argibay .... Toribio Torres, alias "Gardelito"
- Walter Vidarte .... Picayo, a friend
- Lautaro Murúa .... Boss
- Virginia Lago ... Girl, Toribio's neighbor
- Nora Palmer .... Margot
- Tonia Carrero ... Pilar
- Raúl Parini ... Feasini
- Raúl del Valle ... Julián
- Orlando Sacha ... Leoncio
- Nelly Tesolín
- Héctor Pellegrini

One of the major themes of the film is based around poverty and street crime

== Other ==
- Rafael Diserio
- Cacho Espíndola
- Carmen Giménez .... Tía
- Alberto Barcel .... (uncredited)

== Overview ==
A representative of the "new cinemas" that arose in the late 50s and early 60s, Murúa's Alias Gardelito ranks among the best of Argentine cinema in the period, along with films by Simón Feldman, David José Kohon, Rodolfo Kuhn, Manuel Antín, René Mugica. According to Paulo Antonio Paranaguá (O cinema na América Latina), in these works the characters' psychology takes the upper hand upon social themes, although usually the latter also provide a significant context for their action, as is the case here.

Antihero Toribio (Alberto Argibay) with a girl friend (Virginia Lago)

== Release and acclaim ==
The film premiered in 1961. Produced by Rio Negro Productions it was distributed by Cinemagroup in 2002 on DVD.
