= Feliz domingo para la juventud =

Argentine television game show

Feliz domingo para la juventud (English: Merry Sunday for the youth) was an Argentine television game show. It was aired from 1970 to 1999 by Canal 9. In this show a number of teams of high-school students sought a free trip to San Carlos de Bariloche to celebrate their graduation.
