= Maurice Jouvet =

Argentine actor (1923–1999)

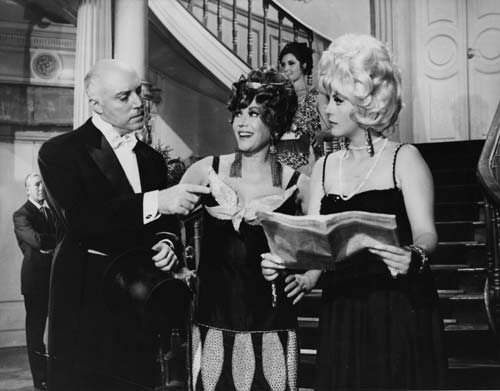
The actors Maurice Jouvet, Elena Lucena and Libertad Leblanc, in the film The House of Madame Lulú (1968).

Maurice Jouvet (Hendaye, 3 February 1923 – Buenos Aires, 5 March 1999) was a French-born Argentine actor. He was married to actress Nelly Beltrán, with whom he had a daughter.

== Selected filmography ==
- 1942: Bajó un ángel del cielo.
- 1953: End of the Month
- 1955: La mujer desnuda.
- 1956: Enigma de mujer.
- 1962: Bajo un mismo rostro.
- 1963: Rata de puerto, como el Rumano.
- 1964: Así o de otra manera.
- 1964: Canuto Cañete y los 40 ladrones.
- 1964: Con gusto a rabia.
- 1964: El octavo infierno, cárcel de mujeres, como Pardo
- 1964: Máscaras en otoño.
- 1965: Ahorro y préstamo para el amor.
- 1965: Canuto Cañete, detective privado.
- 1965: Pajarito Gómez, una vida feliz.
- 1966: La buena vida.
- 1966: Escala musical.
- 1966: La gorda.
- 1966: Vivir es formidable.
- 1967: Coche cama, alojamiento.
- 1967: La cigarra está que arde.
- 1968: Destino para dos.
- 1968: La casa de Madame Lulú.
- 1968: Ufa con el sexo.
- 1968: Villa Cariño está que arde.
- 1969: Blum.
- 1969: Deliciosamente amoral.
- 1972: Autocine mon amour.
- 1972: Nino.
- 1974: En el gran circo.
- 1974: La Patagonia rebelde.
- 1974: Los Gauchos judíos.
- 1975: Más allá del sol.
- 1976: Don Carmelo Il Capo.
- 1977: Los superagentes biónicos.
- 1978: El divorcio está de moda (de común acuerdo).
- 1979: Custodio de señoras.
- 1980: Comandos azules, como Nicolái Pushkin.
- 1981: La magia de Los Parchís, como Villegas.
- 1982: Las aventuras de los Parchís.
- 1984: Todo o nada.
- 1987: La Clínica del Dr. Cureta.
- 1987: Los taxistas del humor.
- 1990: Negra medianoche.
- 1991: Ya no hay hombres.
- 1991: Manuela.
- 1996: El mundo contra mí.
