= Eddie Pequenino =

Argentinian musician (1928–2000)

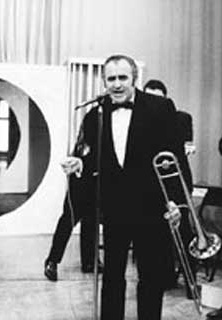
- Eddie Pequenino in 1962
- Born: 1 April 1928; Buenos Aires, Argentina
- Died: 21 July 2000 (aged 72); Buenos Aires, Argentina
- Occupation: Actor
- Years active: 1957–1985 (film)

Eddie Pequenino (1928–2000) was an Argentine film actor, musician, singer, trombone player and comedian. He is widely considered as one of the forefathers of Argentine rock. In 1956 he formed the first rock and roll band in Argentina and made the first recordings of that genre in the country. He directed the orchestra of the hugely popular television show Domingos para la Juventud ("Sundays for the Youth") —later known as Feliz domingo ("Happy Sunday")— and participated with Mariano Mores in the first mega-show held in Argentina, Buenos Aires canta al Mundo ("Buenos Aires Sings to the World"). On TV he Aldo participated in the very popular show El Club del Clan, starred in the famous sketch La peluquería de Don Mateo ("The barbershop of Don Mateo") and had a supporting role working with famous comedian Alberto Olmedo in the classic comedy show No toca botón ("Don't touch the button"). He also worked as an actor in twenty films. In 1965 he received the Martín Fierro award as the revelation of the year.

== Selected filmography ==
- Venga a bailar el rock (1957)
- Would you marry me? (1967)
- Barbarian Queen (1985)

== Bibliography ==
- Peter Cowie & Derek Elley. World Filmography: 1967. Fairleigh Dickinson University Press, 1977.
