= A Hole in the Wall (1982 film) =

El agujero en la pared
- Directed by: David José Kohon
- Written by: David José Kohon
- Starring: Alfredo Alcón
- Release date: 1982
- Running time: 115 minute
- Country: Argentina
- Language: Spanish

A Hole in the Wall (Spanish: El agujero en la pared) is a 1982 Argentine film directed by David José Kohon.

It is loosely inspired in Faust and fictionalizes the era of the Argentine dictatorship.

== Cast ==
- Alfredo Alcón
- Mario Alarcón
- María Noel
- Walter Santa Ana
- Virginia Romay
- David Tonelli
- Juan Carlos Chávez
- Ingrid Pelicori
- Manuel Callau
- Luis Linares
- Oscar Roy
