= Graciela Alfano =

Argentine actress and model (born 1952)

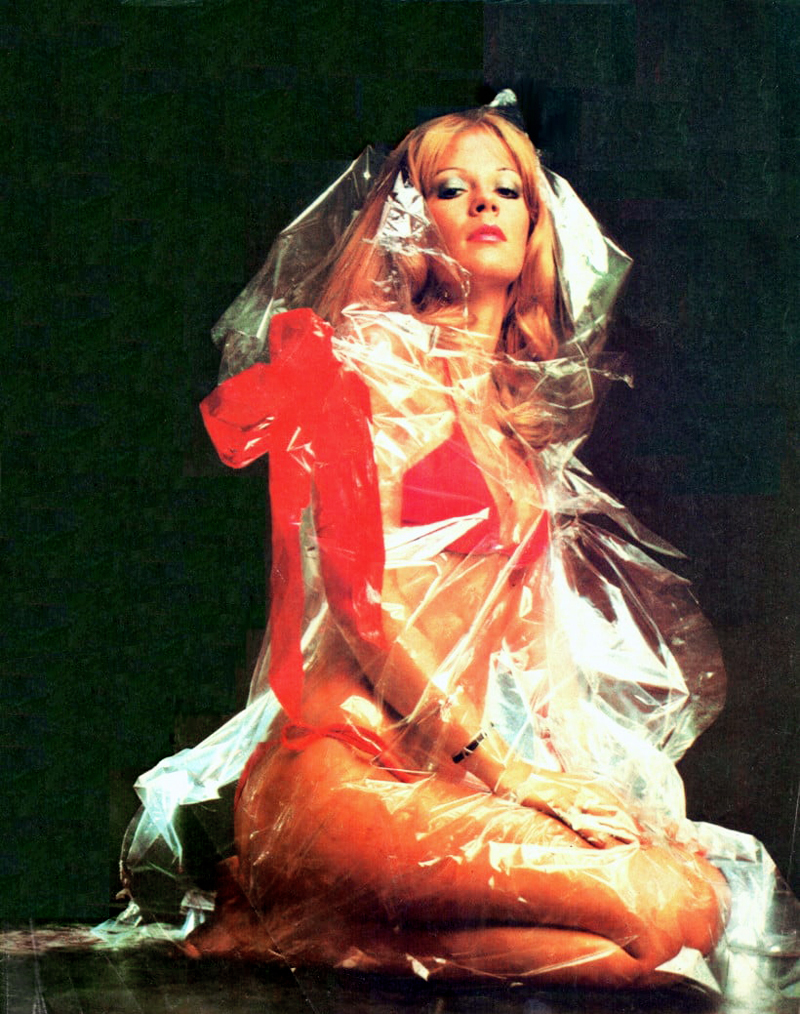
- Alfano in 1976
- Born: 14 December 1952 (age 73); Buenos Aires, Argentina
- Occupations: Actress; model
- Years active: 1971–present
- Spouses: Andrés Ruszkowski (m. 1971, divorced); Enrique Capozzolo (m. 1982; div. 2007)
- Partner: Matías Alé (2000–2008)
- Children: 3

Graciela Alfano (born 14 December 1952) is an Argentine actress and model. She is best known for her appearances in comedies between the late 1970s and early 1980s which made her a sex symbol. She has worked as a judge on Bailando por un sueño in Argentina.

== Filmography ==
=== Film ===
- The Great Adventure (1974)
- Los irrompibles (1975)
- El gordo catástrofe (1977)
- El divorcio está de moda (1978)
- Fotógrafo de señoras (1978)
- Los éxitos del amor (1979)
- Custodio de señoras (1979)
- ... y mañana serán hombres (1979)
- La Nona (1979)
- La aventura de los paraguas asesinos (1979)
- Los drogadictos (1979)
- Locos por la música (1980)
- Departamento compartido (1980)
- Tiro al aire (1980)
- Gran valor (1980)
- Las vacaciones del amor (1981)
- La invitación (1982)
- Los superagentes contra los fantasmas (1986)
- Atreverse a la última jugada (1987)
- Los taxistas del humor (1987)
- Nada por perder (2001)
- Testigo íntimo (2015)
- Mariel espera (2017)

=== Television ===
- Mi amigo Andrés (1973)
- Alta comedia (1974)
- Se armó la Alfano (1975)
- Porcelandia (1975)
- Sábados gigantes (Chile, 1975). Guest
- Nosotros (1975–1976)
- El show de Eber y Nélida Lobato (1976)
- Mi querido Luis (1976)
- De pe a pa (1977)
- Invitación a Jamaica (1977)
- Renato (1978)
- El tío Porcel (1978)
- La ciudad de dos hombres (1981)
- Juego de dos (1981–1982)
- Noche de gigantes (Chile, 1982). Guest
- Situación límite (1984)
- Bellezas (1985)
- Mediomundo (Chile, 1985). Guest
- Las gatitas y ratones de Porcel (1986)
- Los taxistas del humor (1986)
- Hombres de ley (1987). Special appearance
- El gran club (1988–1989). TV host
- Atreverse (1990)
- Graciela y Andrés de una a tres (1991–1993). TV host
- Luces y sombras (1992). Special appearance
- Son de diez (1993). Special appearance
- La familia Benvenuto (1994). Guest
- Cha cha cha (1995)
- El periscopio (1996). TV host
- Viva el lunes (Chile, 1996). Guest
- Gigante y usted (Chile, 1996). Guest
- Una vez más (Chile, 1996). Guest
- Adrenalina (Chile, 1996). Special appearance
- Graciela de América (1997. TV host
- Teatro en Canal 13 (Chile, 1997). Special appearance
- Noche de ronda (Chile, 1997). Guest
- Gasoleros (1998). Special appearance
- Na' que ver con Chile (Chile, 1998). Special appearance
- Totalmente (1999). Special appearance
- Videomatch (1999). Special appearance
- La Argentina de Tato (1999)
- La Biblia y el calefón (1999)
- Biografías no autorizadas (2000)
- El triciclo (Chile, 2000). Guest
- De pe a pa (Chile, 2000). Guest
- Versus (2000)
- El lunes sin falta (Chile, 2001). Guest
- Aquí se pasa mundial (Chile, 2002). Guest
- Teletón 2002 (Chile, 2002). Guest
- La última tentación (Chile, 2005). Guest
- Intrusos en el espectáculo (2006). Guest
- Patito feo (2007). Special appearance
- Bailando por un Sueño 2007 (2007). Judge
- Un tiempo después (2008). Special appearance
- El Musical de tus Sueños (2009). Judge
- Este es el show (2009). Guest
- Bailando 2010 (2010). Judge
- Bailando 2011 (2011). Judge
- Fort Night Show (2012)
- La pelu (2012). Special appearance (sketch)
- Plan TV (2013)
- Gracias por estar, gracias por venir (2013)
- Secretos verdaderos (2013)
- Bailando 2014 (2014). Replacement judge
- La noche de Mirtha (2015). Guest
- Almorzando con Mirtha Legrand (2015). Guest
- El diario de Mariana (2015). Guest
- Bailando 2016 (2016). Replacement judge
- Este es el show (2016). Guest
- Susana Giménez (2016). Special appearance (sketch)
- Almorzando con Mirtha Legrand (2017). Guest
- Pasapalabra (2017). Guest
- Cortá por Lozano (2017). Guest
- Piriápolis siempre (Uruguay, 2018). Guest
- La noche de Mirtha (2019). Guest
- El diario de Mariana (2019). Guest
- Almorzando con Mirtha Legrand (2019). Guest
- Los ángeles de la mañana (2019). TV panelist
- Todo puede pasar (2020). Judge
