= El Rufián =

- Directed by: Daniel Tinayre
- Written by: Eduardo Borrás
- Release date: 1961
- Running time: 120 minute
- Country: Argentina
- Language: Spanish

El Rufián is a 1961 Argentine film directed by Daniel Tinayre.

== Cast ==
- Egle Martin ... Isabel-Florelle
- Carlos Estrada ... Hector
- Óscar Rovito ... Raul
- Nathán Pinzón ... Andres
- Aída Luz ... Berta
- Aníbal Pardeiro ... Dr. Marco
- Daniel de Alvarado ... Dr. Danieli
- Nelly Beltrán
- Cayetano Biondo
- Homero Cárpena
- Carlos Cotto
- Lucio Deval ... Policia 1
- Zulema Esperanza
- Ovidio Fuentes
- Eduardo de Labar
- Carmen Llambí
- Gaston Marchetto
- Víctor Martucci
- Inés Moreno
- Luis Orbegozo
- Gilberto Peyret ... Policía 2
- Alberto Quiles
- Martha Roldán
- Orestes Soriani
- Isidro Fernán Valdez
- Oscar Valicelli ... Angel
- Marcos Zucker
