= Clínica con música =

1974 film by Francisco Guerrero

- Directed by: Francisco Guerrero
- Written by: Jordan de la Cazuela; Augusto Giustozzi
- Release date: 4 April 1974 (Argentina)
- Running time: 90 minutes
- Country: Argentina
- Language: Spanish

Clínica con música is a 1974 Argentine film directed by Francisco Guerrero.

== Cast ==
- Marta Bianchi as Graciella
- Carlos Perciavalle as Edison Smith
- Antonio Gasalla as Tarzán
- Thelma Stefani as MD. Bevilacqua
- Norman Briski as Rosendo
- Adriana Aguirre
