= Edmundo Sanders =

Argentine speaker and actor

Edmundo Sanders was an Argentine speaker and actor. He starred in the 1962 film Una Jaula no tiene secretos.
