= Two Quixotes On Wheels =

Dos quijotes sobre ruedas
- Release date: 1966
- Running time: 89 minute
- Country: Argentina
- Language: Spanish

Two Quixotes On Wheels (Dos quijotes sobre ruedas) is a 1966 Argentine film. It won many awards.

== Cast ==
Directed by Emilio Written by Abel Santacruz

Star actors: Julio Aldama, Alejandro Anderson, Ricardo Bauleo
