= Marta Bianchi =

Argentine actress (born 1943)

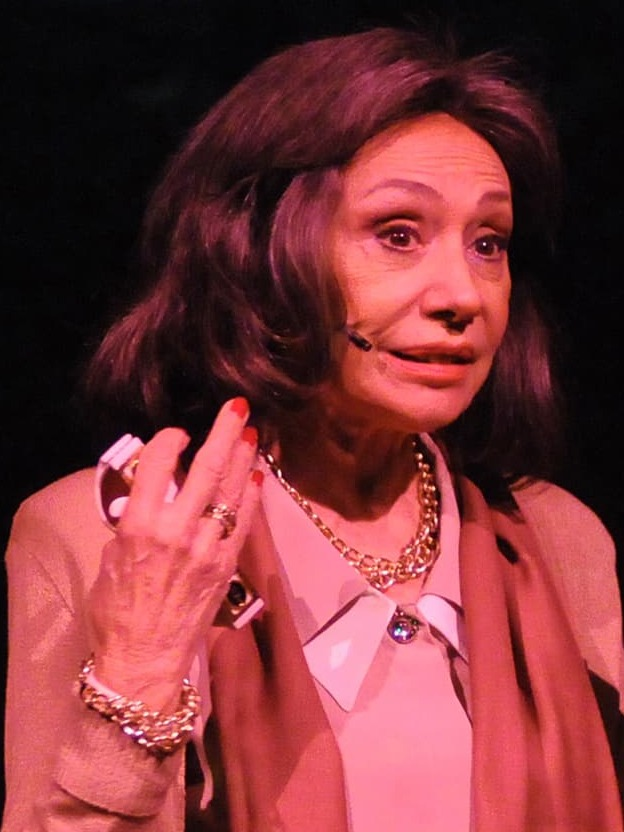
- Bianchi in 2010
- Born: 25 October 1943 (age 82); Buenos Aires, Argentina
- Occupation: Actress
- Spouse: Luis Brandoni (divorced)

Marta Bianchi (born 25 October 1943) is an Argentine comic-dramatic actress of cinema, theater and television.

== Biography ==
Bianchi is an actress who was characterized by her versatility and professionalism with which she performed her interpretations in film, theater and television. She is a graduate of the "National School of Dramatic Art".

In 1974, she received threats together with her then husband, the actor Luis Brandoni by Triple A. After being exiled for a time in Mexico, they returned to the country. On 9 July 1976, when they left the theater, together with Spanish actor Miguel Gila, a task force coordinated by Aníbal Gordon was waiting for them to take them to the clandestine center Automotores Orletti, where they remained for about five hours, until they were released. Gila spoke to Emilio Alfaro, and convinced Army General Arturo Corbetta to release them.

== Career ==
=== Television ===
On the small screen Bianchi made her debut in 1963 with the company of Narciso Ibáñez Menta. She worked with greats such as Luisina Brando, Bárbara Mujica, Miguel Ángel Solá, Julio de Grazia, Brandoni, Ricardo Darín, Rodolfo Ranni, María Valenzuela, Mirta Busnelli, Selva Alemán, Marta González, Virginia Lago, Hilda Bernard and Erika Wallner.

=== Film ===
In cinema, Bianchi has a long career in which she shared scenes with actors of the stature of Héctor Alterio, Soledad Silveyra, Brandoni, Alicia Bruzzo, Graciela Borges, Lautaro Murúa, Enzo Viena, Arturo García Buhr, Ulises Dumont, Moria Casán, Thelma Stefani, Antonio Gasalla, Carlos Perciavalle, Pepe Soriano, Arturo Bonín and Patricio Contreras, among many others.

=== Stage ===
Bianchi worked in numerous theatrical works in places such as the Teatro Abierto, Teatro General San Martín, Teatro Argentino, Teatro Payro and Teatro Universal.

== Personal life ==
Bianchi was married for more than 20 years to actor Luis Brandoni with whom she had her daughters Florencia and Micaela.

== Filmography ==
- 1963: El sátiro (TV Mini Series, 5 episodes)
- 1963: Racconto
- 1965: Show Rambler (TV Movie)
- 1967: La muchacha del cuerpo de oro
- 1968: Chúmbale
- 1969: Sátiro (TV Mini Series, 15 episodes)
- 1970: Uno entre nosotros (TV Series, 19 episodes)
- 1970: Gran teatro universal (TV Series, 1 episode)
- 1970: Años de amor y coraje (TV Series, 19 episodes)
- 1971: Teatro 13 (TV Series, 1 episode)
- 1971: Cuatro hombres para Eva (TV Series, 29 episodes)
- 1970-1971: Alta comedia (TV Series, 2 episodes)
- 1972: Basuras humanas
- 1972: Autocine mon amour
- 1973: Piel de pueblo (TV Series, 3 episodes)
- 1973: José María y María José: Una pareja de hoy
- 1974: Clínica con música
- 1976: Alone
- 1980: Hombres en pugna (TV Movie)
- 1981: Los especiales de ATC (TV Series, 1 episode)
- 1982: El mundo del espectáculo (TV Series, 1 episode)
- 1982: El ciclo de Guillermo Bredeston y Nora Cárpena (TV Series, 1 episode)
- 1984: Los gringos (TV Mini Series, 19 episodes)
- 1984: La rosales
- 1984: Murder in the Senate
- 1985: There's Some Guys Downstairs
- 1987: Made in Argentina
- 1988: De fulanas y menganas (TV Series)
- 1990: La bonita página (TV Series, 1 episode)
- 1993-1996: Mi cuñado (TV Series, 248 episodes)
- 1996: Como pan caliente (TV Series, 39 episodes)
- 1996: A Casa de Açúcar
- 1999: Champions of Life (TV Series)
- 2001: Las amantes (TV Series, 19 episodes)
- 2004: Cuentos clásicos de terror (TV Series 2004, 1 episode)
- 2008: Killer Women (TV Series, 1 episode)
- 2008: Oportunidades (TV Movie)
- 2009: Campo Cerezo
- 2010: It's Your Fault
- 2012: El Tabarís, lleno de estrellas (TV Movie)
