= Luis Brandoni =

Argentine actor and politician (1940–2026)

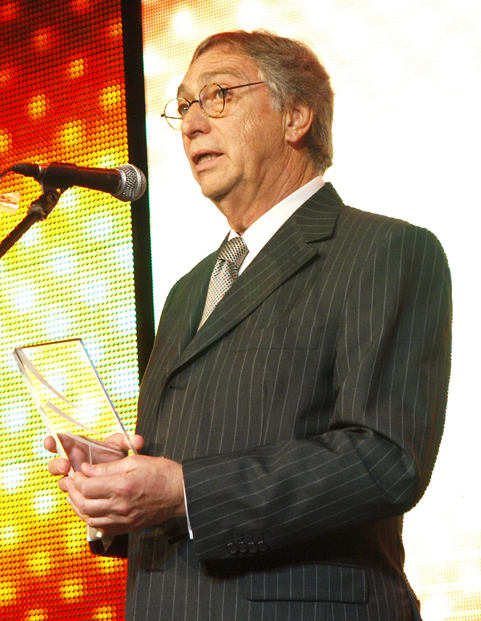
- Brandoni in 2010
- Born: Adalberto Luis Brandoni; 18 April 1940; Dock Sud, Buenos Aires Province, Argentina
- Died: 20 April 2026 (aged 86); Buenos Aires, Argentina
- Occupations: Actor; politician
- Years active: 1962–2026
- Spouse: Marta Bianchi (former)

National Deputy
- In office 10 December 1997 – 10 December 2001
- Constituency: Buenos Aires

Adalberto Luis Brandoni (18 April 1940 – 20 April 2026) was an Argentine actor and politician.

== Early life and career ==
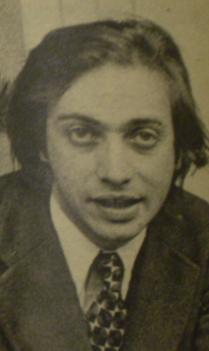
Brandoni in 1970

Brandoni was born in Dock Sud, a port community east of Avellaneda. He debuted on the stage in 1962, television in 1963, and in film in 1966. He joined the National Comedy Theater in 1964 under the direction of Luisa Vehil.

Politically active in the centrist Radical Civic Union (UCR) party, he also served as cultural policy adviser for President Raúl Alfonsín (1983–1989), and was elected to the Argentine Chamber of Deputies, where he served until 2001. He was an unsuccessful Argentine Senate candidate for the UCR in 2005, and for Vice Governor of Buenos Aires Province, with nominee Ricardo Alfonsín, in 2007.

An actor with extensive film, television and theatre credits, he portrayed leading roles in acclaimed pictures such as La tregua (1974), Juan que reía (1976), Darse cuenta (1984), Esperando la carroza (1985), Made in Argentina (1986), Cien veces no debo (1990), Convivencia (1993), Una sombra ya pronto serás (1994), De mi barrio con amor (1995), and Los pasos perdidos (2001).

His career remained active in later decades. Among his notable theatre credits was his portrayal of former President Arturo Illia; and his notable television credits included a co-starring role in Telefé's sitcom El hombre de tu vida, together with Guillermo Francella and directed by Juan José Campanella. He also starred in Gastón Duprat & Mariano Cohn's comedy film Mi obra maestra (2018), together again with Francella. He starred in the Star+ television series Nada, released in 2023, which featured a supporting cast including Robert De Niro.

Brandoni also served in numerous actors' guilds, including the International Federation of Actors (IFA), where he served as vice president between 1974 and 2004.

== Personal life and death ==
Brandoni was married to actress Marta Bianchi, and in 2007 married Mónica López.

He died in Buenos Aires on 20 April 2026, at the age of 86, after complications from a subdural hematoma caused by a domestic fall several days earlier.

== Awards ==
Brandoni won several awards, including four Martín Fierro Awards (1970, 1993, 1995 and 2017), and two Argentine Film Critics Association Silver Condor awards for Best Actor for his roles in Seré cualquier cosa pero te quiero and Convivencia.

== Controversies ==
In July 2017, the Argentine Association of Actors issued a statement criticizing Brandoni for comments he had made about Argentina's last dictatorship on the television program Intratables, where he described as "verso" ("falsehood") the designation of the regime as "civil-military", while denying significant civilian participation in the military government.
