= David José Kohon =

Argentine film director and screenwriter

- Born: 18 October 1929; Buenos Aires
- Died: 30 October 2004 (aged 85); Buenos Aires, Argentina
- Occupations: Film director, screenwriter
- Years active: 1950–1982

David José Kohon (18 October 1929; Buenos Aires – 30 October 2004; ibid.) was an Argentine film director and screenwriter.

He directed and wrote for Argentine films between 1958 and 1982 directing films such as Así o de otra manera (1964), Breve cielo (1969), Con alma y vida (1970) and El Agujero en la pared (1982). Breve cielo was entered into the 6th Moscow International Film Festival.

== Filmography ==
  - Director:
- El agujero en la pared (1982)
- ¿Qué es el otoño? (1977)
- Con alma y vida (1970)
- Breve cielo (1969)
- Así o de otra manera (1964)
- Tres veces Ana (1961)
- Prisioneros de una noche (1960)
- Buenos Aires (short, 1958)
- La flecha y el compás (short, 1950)
  - Writer:
- El agujero en la pared (1982)
- ¿Qué es el otoño? (1977)
- Con alma y vida (1970)
- Breve cielo (1969)
- Así o de otra manera or Confesión (1964)
- Tres veces Ana (1961)
- Buenos Aires (short, 1958)
- La Madre María (1974)
