= 14th Berlin International Film Festival =

1964 film festival in West Berlin, Germany

- Festival poster
- Location: West Berlin, Germany
- Founded: 1951
- Awards: Golden Bear: Dry Summer
- Festival date: 26 June – 7 July 1964
- Website: Website

Berlin International Film Festival chronology
- 15th 13th

The 14th annual Berlin International Film Festival was held from 26 June to 7 July 1964.

The Golden Bear was awarded to Dry Summer directed by Metin Erksan.

The Swedish film 491 by Vilgot Sjöman was rejected by festival director Alfred Bauer owing to its controversial nature.

== Juries ==
The following people were announced as being on the jury for the festival:

=== Main Competition ===
- Anthony Mann, American filmmaker - Jury President
- Hermann Schwerin, West-German jurist and film producer
- Lucas Demare, Argentine filmmaker and producer
- Jacques Doniol-Valcroze, French actor, filmmaker and critic
- Yorgos Javellas, Greek director and screenwriter
- Richard Todd, British actor
- Takashi Hamama, UAE
- Gerd Ressing, West-German historian and journalist

=== Documentary and Short Film Competition ===
- Girija Kanta Mookerjee, Indian diplomat, educator and writer - Jury President
- Ferdinand Kastner, Austrian film critic
- Burhan Arpad, Turkish journalist and writer
- Hans-Joachim Hossfeld, West-German director
- Peter Schamoni, West-German director, screenwriter and producer
- Aud Thagaard, Norwegian film critic
- Roland Verhavert, Belgian director

== Official Sections ==
=== Main Competition ===
The following films were in competition for the Golden Bear award:

English title	Original title	Director(s)	Production Country
Circe		Manuel Antín	Argentina
Destination Death	Herrenpartie	Wolfgang Staudte	West Germany, Yugoslavia
La Difficulté d'être infidèle		Bernard Toublanc-Michel	France, Italy
Dry Summer	Susuz Yaz	Metin Erksan	Turkey
The Escaped	Los evadidos	Enrique Carreras	Argentina
Faust		Michael Suman	United States
The Guns	Os Fuzis	Ruy Guerra	Brazil
The Insect Woman	にっぽん昆虫記	Shōhei Imamura	Japan
In the Affirmative	L'Amour avec des si	Claude Lelouch	France
Mahānagar	মহানগর	Satyajit Ray	India
Night Must Fall		Karel Reisz	United Kingdom
Of Human Bondage		Ken Hughes and Henry Hathaway	United Kingdom
The Pawnbroker		Sidney Lumet	United States
La ragazza di Bube		Luigi Comencini	Italy
School for Suicide	Selvmordsskolen	Knud Leif Thomsen	Denmark
She and He	彼女と彼	Susumu Hani	Japan
Soft Hands	الأيدي الناعمة	Mahmoud Zulfikar	Egypt
This Summer at Five	Kesällä kello 5	Erkko Kivikoski	Finland
Time of the Innocent	Die Zeit der Schuldlosen	Thomas Fantl	West Germany
Tonio Kröger		Rolf Thiele	West Germany, France
La visita		Antonio Pietrangeli	Italy, France
Weeping for a Bandit	Llanto por un bandido	Carlos Saura	Spain, France, Italy

=== Documentary and Short Film Competition ===
English title	Original title	Director(s)	Production Country
Aanmelding		Rob Houwer	Netherlands
An Engineer's Assistant	ある機関助士	Noriaki Tsuchimoto	Japan
The Human Dutch	Alleman	Bert Haanstra	Netherlands
IX. Olympische Winterspiele Innsbruck 1964		Theo Hörmann	Austria
Kirdi		Max Lersch	Austria
Kontraste		Wolfgang Urchs	West Germany
Olle Olson Hagalund		Rune Ericson	Sweden
Polish Passion	Polnische Passion	Janusz Piekałkiewicz	Poland
Signale		Raimund Ruehl	West Germany
Sunday Lark		Sanford Semel	United States

== Official Awards ==
The following prizes were awarded by the Jury:

=== Main Competition ===
- Golden Bear: Dry Summer by Metin Erksan
- Silver Bear for Best Director: Satyajit Ray for Mahānagar
- Silver Bear for Best Actress: Sachiko Hidari for The Insect Woman and She and He
- Silver Bear for Best Actor: Rod Steiger for The Pawnbroker
- Silver Bear Extraordinary Jury Prize: Ruy Guerra for The Guns

=== Documentary and Short Film Competition ===
- Golden Bear Documentaries: Alleman by Bert Haanstra
- Short Film Golden Bear: Kirdi by Max Lersch
- Silver Bear for Best Short Film:
  - Sunday Lark by Sanford Semel
  - Kontraste by Wolfgang Urchs
  - Anmeldung by Rob Houwer
- Silver Bear Extraordinary Jury Prize (Short film): Signale by Raimund Ruehl

== Independent Awards ==
=== FIPRESCI Award ===
- La visita by Antonio Pietrangeli
  - Honorable Mention: The Pawnbroker by Sidney Lumet

=== Interfilm Award ===
- School for Suicide by Knud Leif Thomsen

=== OCIC Award ===
- She and He by Susumu Hani

=== UNICRIT Award ===
- The Human Dutch by Bert Haanstra

=== Youth Film Award (Jugendfilmpreis) ===
- Best Feature Film Suitable for Young People: She and He by Susumu Hani
  - Honorable Mention: Time of the Innocent by Thomas Fantl
- Best Documentary Film Suitable for Young People: The Human Dutch by Bert Haanstra
- Best Short Film Suitable for Young People:
  - Anmeldung by Rob Houwer
  - An Engineer's Assistant by Noriaki Tsuchimoto
