= Ricardo Bauleo =

Argentine actor

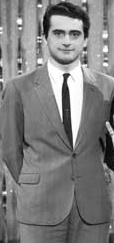
Bauleo in 1964

Ricardo Bauleo (30 August 1940 – 24 April 2014) was an Argentine actor. He worked most on movies and television shows. His best known roles were in Blood of the Virgins (1967), The Curious Dr. Humpp (1969) and Los superagentes no se rompen (1979).

== Life ==
He was born in Buenos Aires.

Bauleo married Thelma Stefani in 1976 but they later divorced. He then married Gilda Lousek with whom he had two daughters.

== Death ==
Bauleo died from heart failure after a long illness on 24 April 2014 in Buenos Aires. He was 73.
