= List of Argentine films of 1979 =

A list films produced in Argentina in 1979:

Argentine films 1979
Title	Director	Release	Genre
A - D
Adiós reino animal	Juan Schröder	29 November	Documentary
Alejandra, mon amour	Julio Saraceni	24 December	Comedy
La aventura de los paraguas asesinos	Carlos Galettini	5 July	Adventure, Comedy
Cantaniño cuenta un cuento	Mario David	6 December	Musical Comedy
La carpa del amor	Julio Porter	5 July	Musical Comedy, Romance
Contragolpe	Alejandro Doria	15 March	Crime
Cuatro pícaros bomberos	Carlos Galettini	17 May	Comedy
Custodio de señoras	Hugo Sofovich	5 April	Comedy
De cara al cielo	Enrique Dawi	3 May	Comedy
Donde duermen dos... duermen tres	Enrique Cahen Salaberry	12 August	Comedy
Los drogadictos	Enrique Carreras	13 September	Comedy, Drama
E - L
Este loco amor loco	Eva Landeck	27 September	Comedy, Drama
Los éxitos del amor	Fernando Siro	1 March	Musical Comedy, Romance
Expertos en pinchazos	Hugo Sofovich	14 June	Comedy
El Fausto criollo	Luis Saslavsky	25 October	Fantasy, Drama
La fiesta de todos	Sergio Renán	24 May	Documentary, Comedy
Hormiga negra	Ricardo Alberto Defilippi	3 May	Drama
Hotel de señoritas	Enrique Dawi	18 October	Comedy
La isla	Alejandro Doria	9 August	Drama
Juventud sin barreras	Ricardo Montes	13 December	Comedy
Las Locuras del profesor	Palito Ortega	15 February	Comedy
M - Z
Mannequin... alta tensión	Massimo Giuseppe Alviani	1 March	
Millonarios a la fuerza	Enrique Dawi	12 July	
Las muñecas que hacen ¡Pum!	Gerardo Sofovich	27 September	Comedy
La nona	Héctor Olivera	10 May	
El poder de las tinieblas	Mario Sábato	14 June	
La rabona	Mario David	22 March	
El Rey de los exhortos	Hugo Sofovich	30 August	Comedy
Los superagentes no se rompen	Julio De Grazia	1 February	
El último amor en Tierra del Fuego	Armando Bó	11 October	
Vivir con alegría	Palito Ortega	12 July	
...Y mañana serán hombres	Carlos F. Borcosque	19 April	drama

== External links and references ==
- Argentine films of 1979 at the Internet Movie Database
