= List of Argentine films of 1980 =

A list of films produced in Argentina in 1980:

Argentine films of 1980
Title	Director	Release	Genre
A - C
A los cirujanos se les va la mano	Hugo Sofovich	19 June	comedy
Así no hay cama que aguante	Hugo Sofovich	6 March	comedy
Bárbara	Gino Landi	12 June	
Buenos Aires, la tercera fundación	Clara Zappettini	5 June	
La canción de Buenos Aires	Fernando Siro	28 February	comedy
Castelao (Biografía de un ilustre gallego)	Jorge Preloran		Animated
Comandos azules	Emilio Vieyra	27 March	Aventuras
Comandos azules en acción	Emilio Vieyra	4 September	Aventuras
Crucero de placer	Carlos Borcosque	20 March	comedy
A - Z
Departamento compartido	Hugo Sofovich	18 September	comedy
Desde el abismo	Fernando Ayala	3 April	
El Diablo metió la pata	Carlos Rinaldi	10 April	comedy
Días de ilusión	Fernando Ayala	3 July	
La discoteca del amor	Adolfo Aristarain	7 August	Musical
Frutilla	Enrique Carreras	15 May	comedy
Gran valor	Enrique Cahen Salaberry	9 October	comedy
Hector de Mauro Puppeteer	Jorge Preloran		Documentary
A - Z
El infierno tan temido	Raúl de la Torre	7 August	Drama
Locos por la música	Enrique Dawi	2 May	Musical
Luther Metke at 94	Jorge Preloran		Cortometraje
Más allá de la aventura	Oscar Barney Finn	4 December	Aventuras
Los miedos	Alejandro Doria	14 August	Drama
Mis días con Verónica	Néstor Lescovich	13 March	Drama
La noche viene movida	Gerardo Sofovich	17 January	comedy
Operación Comando	Julio Saraceni	29 May	Aventuras
La playa del amor	Adolfo Aristarain	21 February	comedy
Q - Z
¡Qué linda es mi familia!	Palito Ortega	17 July	Musical
Queridas amigas	Carlos Orgambide	5 June	Drama
Ritmo a todo color	Máximo Berrondo	11 September	comedy
Rosa de lejos	María Herminia Avellaneda	6 November	Drama
Subí que te llevo	Rubén W. Cavallotti	21 August	comedy
Los superagentes contra todos	Carlos Galettini	10 July	Aventuras
Los superagentes y la gran aventura del oro	Carlos Galettini	4 December	Aventuras
El tango en el cine	Guillermo Fernández Jurado and Rodolfo Corral	23 October	Musical
Tiro al aire	Mario Sábato	2 October	comedy
Toto Paniagua	Carlos Orgambide	23 October	comedy
Una viuda descocada	Armando Bó	28 August	comedy
