= Polémica en el bar (2016 TV series) =

- Genre: Comedy
- Created by: Gerardo Sofovich
- Starring: Mariano Iúdica; Miguel Ángel Rodríguez; Miguel Granados; Noelia Marzol; Horacio Pagani; Anita Martínez; Tristán; Rodrigo Lussich; Guillermo Coppola; Joaquín Flamini; Kate Rodríguez
- Theme music composer: Jorge Vazquez
- Opening theme: "Cafetín de Buenos Aires" by Jorge Vazquez
- Composer: Jorge Vazquez
- Country of origin: Argentina
- Original language: Spanish
- No. of seasons: 1
- No. of episodes: 42

Production
- Executive producers: Martín Kweller; Gustavo Sofovich; Raúl Slonimsky
- Production location: Buenos Aires
- Running time: 100 minutes
- Production companies: Telefe; Endemol

Original release
- Network: Telefe
- Release: March 6 – December 18, 2016

Polémica en el bar is an Argentine comedy program broadcast by Telefe, and also produced by Endemol. It stars Mariano Iudica, Miguel Angel Rodriguez, Miguel Granados, Noelia Marzol, Horacio Pagani, Anita Martinez, Tristan, Rodrigo Lussich, Guillermo Coppola and Joaquin Flamini, premiered on Sunday, 6 March 2016.

== Premise ==
Polémica en el bar features a number of comedians gathered in a bar, sitting in a round table. They discuss topics such as football, politics and show business, and start controversies around them.

The show is host by Mariano Iudica.

== Production ==
The original Polémica en el bar was created and produced by Gerardo Sofovich, who died in 2015. The new series was launched as an homage, and it is directed by his son, Gustavo Sofovich. The comedian Miguel Ángel Rodríguez reprised the role of "Minguito", an indigent played by his father-in-law Juan Carlos Altavista. The program is led by Rodríguez and Mariano Iúdica, and also includes Guillermo Coppola, Rodrigo Lussich, Anita Martínez, Horacio Pagani, Migue Granados, Noelia Marzol and Joaquín Fammini.

The program includes guest appearances of famous people as well. Some people invited to the program were Carlos Calvo, Susana Giménez, Carlos Balá and Lionel Messi.

== Reception ==
The program got 11.4 rating points during the premiere episode. It was considered a good performance, and it doubled the rating of the programs at the other TV networks.

The newspaper La Nación reviewed the program and considered it of regular quality. It considered that, whereas the original program had tight scripts, the modern one relies heavily on improvisations. The review also considered that the program is too loaded with nostalgia of the original program.

== Cast and characters ==
Character	Actor	Seasons
Character	Actor	1
Conductor	Mariano Iúdica	Main
Minguito "Mingo"	Miguel Ángel Rodríguez	Main
Miguel	Miguel Granados	Main
La camarera	Noelia Marzol	Main
Pagani	Horacio Pagani	Main
La maestra/Adelmar/Pupé	Anita Martínez	Main
El Gallego	Tristán	Main
Lussich	Rodrigo Lussich	Main
El mismo	Guillermo Coppola	Main
Joaco	Joaquín Flamini	Main
El nene	Nazareno Móttola	Recurring
Diego	Diego Pérez	Recurring
Virginia	Virginia Gallardo	Recurring
La chica de las viandas	Soledad Cescato	Recurring

== Adaptations ==
- In 2019, Uruguay’s Channel 10 premiered a local adaptation of the programme in a talk show format addressing current affairs, including politics, sports, and social issues. From 2019 to 2024, it was hosted by Jorge Piñeyrúa, who was later succeeded by journalist Patricia Madrid. Since February 2025, the programme has been presented by Eduardo Gianarelli.
- In 2024, a Paraguayan version premiered on La Tele, hosted by Mili Brítez.
