= Comedia picaresca =

Argentine sexual comedy film genre

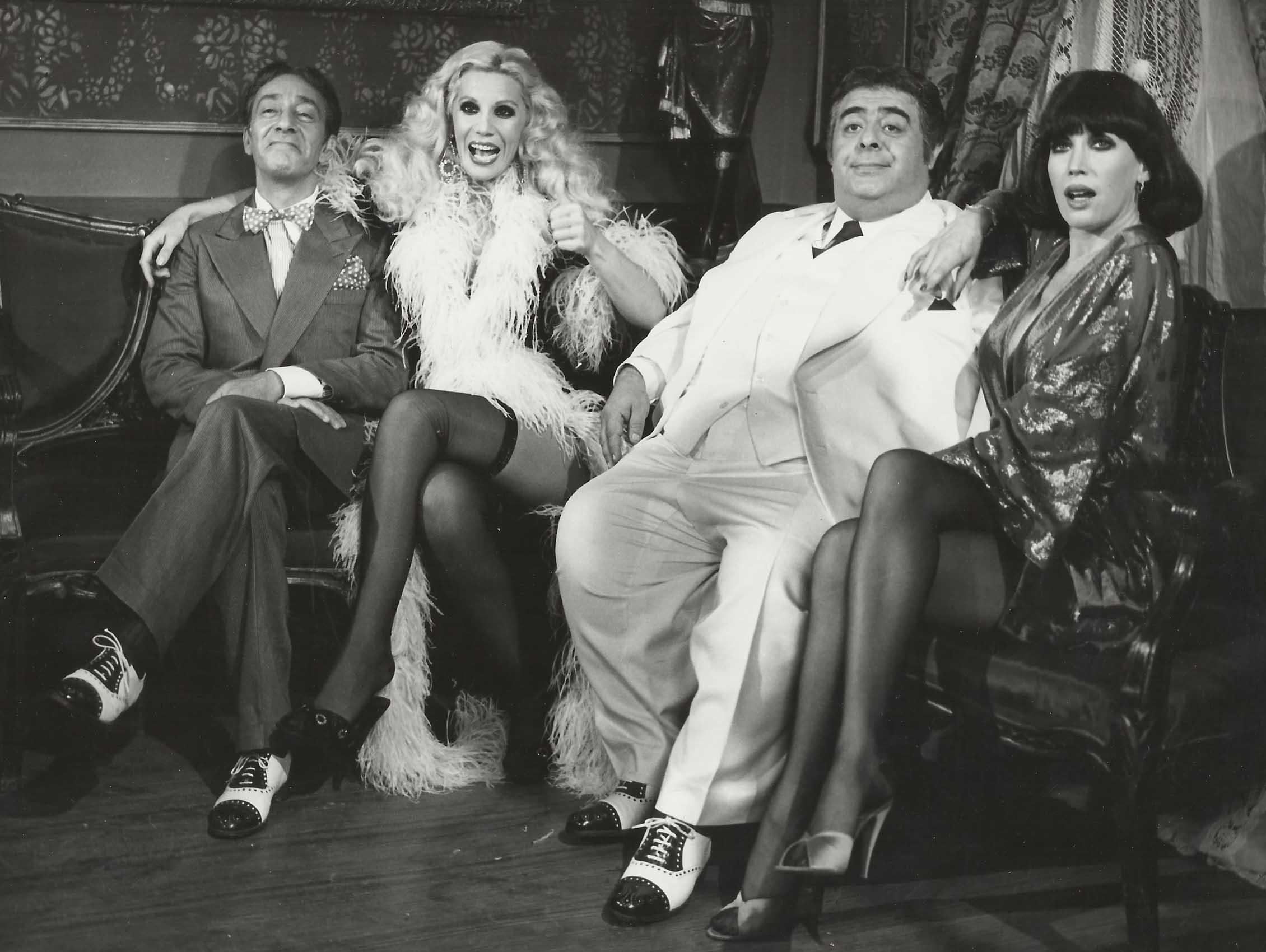
From left to right: Alberto Olmedo, Susana Giménez, Jorge Porcel and Moria Casán in Las mujeres son cosa de guapos (1981), directed by Hugo Sofovich.

The comedia picaresca (Spanish for "picaresque comedy") is a type of sexual comedy film from Argentina that flourished particularly between the 1970s and 1980s, becoming one of the most successful genres in the local film industry during the years of the last civic-military dictatorship (1976–1983). The genre's foremost exponent was the series of films starring the comic duo of Alberto Olmedo and Jorge Porcel for the production company Aries Cinematográfica Argentina, which began in 1973 with Los caballeros de la cama redonda and was characterized by its "light sexual content, the treatment of taboo subjects such as infidelity and the dissociation between sex and love, the use of double entendre, and the presence of scantily clad women as sexual objects." Picaresque comedies were low-budget films shot in a matter of weeks with the aim of bringing the product to market as quickly as possible, emulating the Hollywood quickie model. The genre has been compared to similar phenomena such as Landismo and the cine de destape in Spain, the pornochanchadas in Brazil, and the cine de ficheras or sexycomedias in Mexico.

== History ==
1963's "la cigarra no es un bicho" ("The Cicada is not a Bug") is often credited as the first Argentine comedy film with sex as a central plot element.

Aries Cinematográfica Argentina started producing sex comedies in 1965; the production company later proved instrumental in developing the genre in the South American country. Their first sex comedy was 1966's "Hotel alojamiento" ("Hotel Stay"), directed by Fernando Ayala.

The sex comedy film industry in Argentina gained steam early in the 1970s. In fact, some of the early Argentine sex comedies were financed by the military government themselves, since they realized these popular films were good business for them as the public would go watch the movies, making them money.

1979's "Encuentros muy cercanos con señoras de cualquier tipo" ("Close Encounters with any Kind of Ladies", a comedy whose title spoofs the sci-fi classic Close Encounters of the Third Kind) was another popular Argentine sex comedy. It starred Olmedo, Porcel, Moria Casan and Adriana Aguirre.

During the 1980s, Olmedo and Porcel, along with Susana Gimenez and Casan, for example, collaborated frequently in these types of films. Movies where these and other actors participated were popular in Argentina and other Latin markets, such as Puerto Rico and Spain, for example.

Towards the end of the 1980s, many of these films were recorded exclusively for the Argentine (and international) straight-to-video rental market.

More modern stars who have participated in this genre in Argentina include Ana Katz.

== See also ==
- Commedia sexy all'italiana
- Mexican sex comedy
- Sexploitation film
