= Departamento compartido =

- Directed by: Hugo Sofovich
- Written by: Hugo Sofovich
- Starring: Alberto Olmedo; Tato Bores; Graciela Alfano; Arturo Bonin; Adriana Gardiazabal; Noemi Alan
- Cinematography: Victor Hugo Caula
- Edited by: Eduardo López; Carlos Piaggio
- Music by: Óscar Cardozo Ocampo
- Production company: Film Argentina
- Release date: 18 September 1980 (Argentina)
- Running time: 89 minutes
- Country: Argentina
- Language: Spanish

Departamento compartido (English: Shared apartment) is a 1980 Argentine odd couple-styled comedy film.

== Plot ==
Alberto is a jeweler whose wife, Silvina, has kicked him out of his house because of his slovenly lifestyle. Having no other place to go, the newly divorced Albert asks his friend Mauricio if he can stay at his home. Mauricio is the owner of an imported car dealership and lives a very neat, routine, and quiet lifestyle—the opposite of Alberto. The entry of Alberto into Mauricio's life and their radically clashing personalities results in both awkward and hilarious situations.

== Cast ==
- Alberto Olmedo
- Tato Bores
- Graciela Alfano
- Camila Perissé
- César Bertrand
- Ovidio Fuentes
- Noemí Alan
- Marcos Zucker
- Menchu Quesada
- Arturo Bonín
- Jorge Porcel
