= Chela Ruíz =

Argentine actress

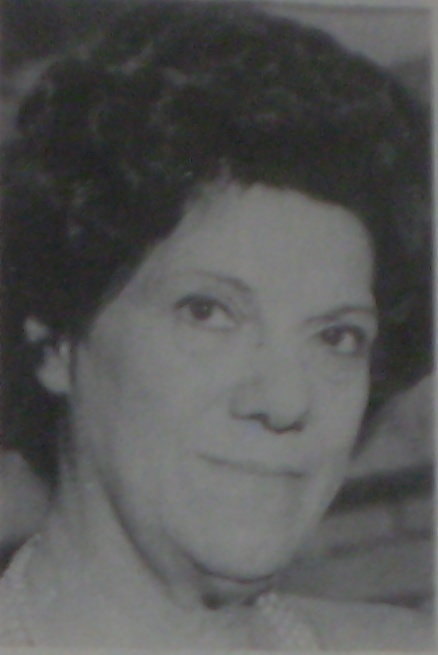
- Born: June 5, 1921
- Died: December 1, 1999 (aged 78)
- Occupation: Actress

Chela Ruiz (5 June 1921 – 1 December 1999) was an Argentine actress in radio, film, television and stage. In 1997 the Argentine Association of Actors awarded her the Premio Podestá for her theatrical work.

== Career ==
Ruiz made her professional debut on Radio Splendid, along with her sister Nora Cullen, working as an actress and reader. In the 1940s and 1950s she was known for her narration of radio plays by Nené Cascallar. She began appearing on stage in 1942. A film career followed later. In 1960 Ruiz starred in Fernando Ayala's Sábado a la noche, cine. Other notable films include La Chacota (1962), La guita (1970), El soltero (1977), Mis días con Verónica (1980), La historia oficial (1985) and La conquista del Paraíso (1981).

In 1997 the Argentine Association of Actors awarded her the Premio Podestá.

== Personal life ==
Ruiz was married to Julio Marino, a doctor, with whom she had two children. She did work with the human rights group Consiencia. In her later years she suffered from Alzheimer's disease.

== Filmography ==
- Los ojos llenos de amor (1954) dir. Carlos Schlieper.
- Sábado a la noche, cine (1960) dir. Fernando Ayala.
- An American in Buenos Aires (1961) dir. George Cahan.
- La chacota (1962) dir. Enrique Dawi.
- Destino para dos (1968) dir. Alberto Du Bois.
- La guita (1970) dir. Fernando Ayala.
- Las sorpresas (1975) (segment Corazonada) dir. Carlos Galettini.
- El soltero (1977) dir. Carlos Borcosque Jr.
- Saverio, el cruel (1977) dir. Ricardo Wullicher.
- La isla (1979) dir. Alejandro Doria.
- Mis días con Verónica (1980) dir. Néstor Lescovich.
- Rosa de lejos (1980) dir. María Herminia Avellaneda.
- La conquista del Paraíso (1981) dir. Eliseo Subiela.
- La historia oficial (1985) dir. Luis Puenzo.
- The Loves of Kafka (1988) dir. Docampo Feijóo y Juan Bautista Stagnaro.
- Mamá querida (1988) dir. Silvio Fishbein.
- El lado oscuro del corazón (1992) dir. Eliseo Subiela.
- Sus ojos se cerraron y el mundo sigue andando (1997) dir. Jaime Chávarri
- Cenizas del paraíso (1997) dir. Marcelo Piñeyro.
