= Expertos en Pinchazos =

1979 film by Hugo Sofovich

- Directed by: Hugo Sofovich
- Starring: Alberto Olmedo, Jorge Porcel, Moria Casán
- Edited by: Carlos Piaggio
- Release date: 1979
- Running time: 90 minutes
- Country: Argentina
- Language: Spanish

Expertos en Pinchazos is a 1979 Argentine sex comedy film directed by Hugo Sofovich.

== Cast ==
- Alberto Olmedo ... Alberto
- Jorge Porcel ... Jorge
- Moria Casán ... Fabiana
- Tincho Zabala ... Don Antonio
- Jorge Martínez
- Patricia Dal
- Reina Reech
- César Bertrand
- Jorgelina Aranda
- Mónica Lander
- Giselle Durcal
- Alberto Irizar
- Ricardo Morán
- Juan Alberto Mateyko
- Tina Francis
