= List of Argentine films of 1981 =

A list of films produced in Argentina in 1981:

== 1981 ==
Title	Director	Actors	Genre	Notability
1981
Amante para dos	Hugo Sofovich	Alberto Olmedo		
La Conquista del paraíso				
Los Crápulas				
Cosa de locos	Enrique Dawi	Palito Ortega, Carlos Balá, Enzo Bai	Musical comedy	
De la misteriosa Buenos Aires				
Gran valor en la facultad de medicina	Enrique Cahen Salaberry	Juan Carlos Calabró, Adriana Aguirre, Monica Gonzaga, José Cibrián	Comedy	Written by Abel Santacruz
El Hombre del subsuelo				
Momentos				

Title	Director	Cast	Genre	Notes
Mire qué lindo es mi país				
Mientras me dure la vida				
Los Parchís contra el inventor invisible	Mario Sabato	Constantino Fernández, Óscar Cañada, David Muñoz, Yolanda Ventura	Comedy kids	
La Pulga en la oreja				
Las Vacaciones del amor				
Los Viernes de la eternidad	Héctor Olivera	Thelma Biral, Héctor Alterio, Nora Cullen, Guillermo Battaglia	Drama	Award-winning
Visión de un asesino				
El Violinista				
Ritmo, amor y primavera				
Sentimental	Sergio Renán			Entered into the 12th Moscow International Film Festival
Tiempo de revancha		Arturo Maly		

== External links and references ==
- Argentine films of 1981 at the Internet Movie Database
