= Fotógrafo de señoras =

- Directed by: Hugo Moser
- Release date: 1978
- Running time: 92 minute
- Country: Argentina
- Language: Spanish

Fotógrafo de señoras is a 1978 Argentine comedy film directed by Hugo Moser.

== Cast ==
- Jorge Porcel
- Graciela Alfano
- Javier Portales
- Tristán
- Adolfo García Grau
- Adriana Quevedo
- César Bertrand
- Stella Maris Lanzani
- Carlos Gros
- Alberto Olmedo
