= Basta de mujeres =

1977 film by Hugo Moser

- Film poster
- Directed by: Hugo Moser
- Written by: Jorge Basurto
- Produced by: Nicolás Carreras, Luis Osvaldo Repetto
- Cinematography: Victor Hugo Caula
- Edited by: Carlos Piaggio
- Music by: Buddy McCluskey
- Production company: Aries Cinematográfica Argentina
- Release date: March 31, 1977 (Buenos Aires)
- Running time: 93 minutes
- Country: Argentina
- Language: Spanish

Basta de mujeres is a 1977 Argentine sex comedy film directed by Hugo Moser and written by Jorge Basurto. It stars Alberto Olmedo and Susana Giménez.

== Cast ==
- Alberto Olmedo
- Susana Giménez
- Gilda Lousek
- Juan Carlos Dual
- Adolfo García Grau
- César Bertrand
- Alberto Busaid
- Roberto Carnaghi
- Juan José Camero
- Susana Traverso
- Jorge Porcel
- Jorgelina Aranda
