= Sofovich =

Sofovich may refer to:

- Gerardo Sofovich (1937–2015), Argentine TV host, comic and screenwriter
- Hugo Sofovich (1939–2003), Argentine film director and screenwriter
- Manuel Sofovich (1900–1960), Argentine journalist
