= Carmen Morales =

Argentine actress (1939–2021)

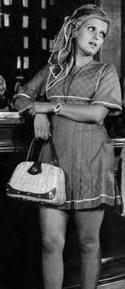
- Morales in 1973
- Born: 10 October 1939; Buenos Aires, Argentina
- Died: 13 August 2021 (aged 81); Buenos Aires, Argentina
- Occupation: Actress
- Children: 1

Carmen Morales (10 October 1939 – 13 August 2021) was an Argentine comic actress of film, stage and television.

== Biography ==
Morales lived in a neighborhood on Calle Pilcomayo de Piñeyro in Avellaneda, in the Don Santin butcher shop.

Morales began as a model at a very young age, to soon work on TV in the Pepe Biondi program. She then was hired by the famous businessman, actor and director Gerardo Sofovich, whom she would later marry, to work on Operación Ja-Já. Her relationship with Sofovich allowed her to show off her talents as an actress in dozens of films and television series during the 1980s. She stood out alongside brilliant figures such as Jorge Porcel, Alberto Olmedo, Fidel Pintos, Tristán, Luisa Albinoni, María Rosa Fugazot, Susana Traverso, Rolo Puente, among others.

Her stage name lent itself to confusion with that of the actress and singer Carmen del Moral, who made a certain part of her career in Spain.

== Personal life ==
Morales married cameraman Juan Carlos García Acha on 24 December 1963, he was a friend of Sofovich. During their honeymoon in Brazil, Morales and her husband suffered a serious car accident, García Acha died and Morales was miraculously saved. During their long convalescence, Morales and Sofovich began a passionate romance that lasted more than thirty years, separating in 1995. In 1968, they had their only son Gustavo Sofovich, who in turn gave them a granddaughter, Tatiana, and a grandson, Ignacio.

In May 1984, she suffered a violent robbery at her home that nearly cost her life.

== Death ==
Morales died of complications from Alzheimer's disease in Buenos Aires on 13 August 2021.
