= René Bertrand =

Argentine actor (1971–2025)

- Born: René Rogelio Roberto Caumont; 25 August 1971; Buenos Aires, Argentina
- Died: 26 June 2025 (aged 53); Buenos Aires, Argentina
- Occupations: Actor; Theatre director
- Years active: 1990–2025
- Partner: Belén Giménez (2009–2025)
- Children: Sofía Lisette Caumont; Franco Gael Caumont

René Rogelio Roberto Caumont (25 August 1971 – 26 June 2025), better known as René Bertrand, was an Argentine actor and theatre director, third generation of a family of artists: son of the actor César Bertrand (1934–2008) and the renowned actress María Rosa Fugazot, grandson of María Esther Gamas (1911–2006) and the musician Roberto Fugazot (1902–1971). His godfather was the actor Alberto Olmedo (1933–1988).

Bertrand died in the Autonomous City of Buenos Aires on 26 June 2025, at the age of 53. The death was confirmed by his mother and the Argentine Actors Association. According to various media reports, the artist was suffering from long-standing metastatic bone cancer, and in the days before his death he had suffered from an acute flu. Although no official medical report was released, close sources indicated that a health collapse, possibly linked to these conditions, triggered his death.

== Artistic career ==
=== Television ===
In 1990, almost immediately after finishing his studies at the National Conservatory of Dramatic Arts, he was called to join the cast of the television drama A Voice on the Telephone, by Alberto Migré broadcast on Channel 9. The following year, Channel 13 called him for Son de 10, a sitcom that also featured other now-renowned actors of that generation such as Florencia Peña and Nicolás Cabré. During 1991, 1992, and 1993, he appeared in several sitcoms on Channel 9, such as "Chance," "Inconquistable Corazón," "El Club de los Baby Sisters," "Corazón de Tiza," "Alta Comedia (television program)," and "Regalo del Cielo." Rodolfo Ledo invited him to join the cast of an episode of the memorable "Sin condena."

In 1992, he landed his first major role as Gaspar, the counterpart to Pablo Rago, in the hit sitcom "Amigos son los amigos," which aired on Telefé and topped the prime-time ratings.

From 1993 to 1996, he continued to be part of the artistic team of Telefé and participated in renowned cycles such as El Gordo y el Flaco, Brigada Cola, Quereme and Los Benvenutto, Chiquititas, Cebollitas. He also began his filming in the theater taking part in El que me toca es un chancho (a work by Alberto Drago) at the General San Martín Cultural Center. Despite his great work activity, Bertrand never put aside his training, participating in various seminars in singing, mime, directing and lighting.

In 1996, he received the "Best Young Work Award" from the Secretariat of Culture of the city of Buenos Aires for his performance in the television series Tribute to Contemporary National Theater broadcast by Channel 9 and in which plays by Argentine authors such as Roberto Cossa, Carlos Gorostiza, Gentile and Oscar Viale were performed. Also during 1996 he was invited to co-star in the sitcom Socios y más, alongside Soledad Silveyra and Claudio García Satur. In 1998 he was part of the entertainment program "Telesuerte" that aired on Channel 9 (Buenos Aires) and during the first half of 1999 he participated in the miniseries "Dracula" starring Carlos Andrés Calvo, Alejandro Awada, Ulises Dumont and Carolina Fal. At the end of 1999, Gerardo Sofovich added him to his ranks in a new edition of his legendary show "La belleza de don Mateo" and it was there where Bertrand, who was part of the 2000, 2003 and 2004 editions of the aforementioned show, showed his best artistic talents and embodied some characters that would remain in the history of said show, such as the Rosarigasino (perhaps his most successful creation on television).

During 2001 and 2002, he was invited by Guillermo Francella to take part in Poné a Francella, a comedy show broadcast on Telefé with singular popularity. In 2005, he participated in the episode "Asignaturas pen-dientes" of the successful sitcom Casados con hijos, starring Francella and Florencia Peña.

In 2010, he appeared on the television program Polémica en el Bar. He returned to television in May 2013, starring alongside Toti Ciliberto in the Argentine comedy classic La belleza de don Mateo by Gerardo Sofovich on the Magazine channel, playing the role of the "client" a character brought to life by unforgettable figures such as Javier Portales, Berugo Carámbula and Rolo Puente.

Also in 2013, he joined the cast of the film "El Negro Olmedo," a film that tells the life of the popular Argentine comedian, in which Bertrand plays none other than his own father, César Bertrand. At the end of the year, he was called by the production company Pol-ka to play a character in the last two episodes of the successful series Solamente Vos, starring Adrián Suar and Natalia Oreiro. During 2017, he served as the acting director for the legendary program Polémica en el Bar, which airs daily on América, produced by Gustavo Sofovich and hosted by Mariano Iúdica. He also made several acting appearances in the program. During 2021 he worked as the director of actors for the program El taller de Checho y Batista which was broadcast daily on TV Pública, with the participation of Tomas Quintin Palma, Señorita Bimbo and Charo López.

In 2022, he was part of the series El Gerente for Star+ directed by Gastón Duprat and Mariano Cohn, and starring Guillermo Francella.

In 2023 he was part of Spartans, a true story for Star+ directed by Sebastián Pivotto, and starring Guillermo Pfening, released on February 19, 2025.

=== Theater ===
His career in commercial theater included several picaresque comedies, among which stands out the most successful comedy in history, "El champagne las pone mimosas" (Champagne Makes Them Mimosas), by a national author (Gerardo Sofovich), with over three uninterrupted years on the bill and exceeding one thousand performances and 700,000 spectators between August 2005 and November 2008. He also stood out in others such as: Bombones y champán, Humor gitano, Le referí Cornud, La risa está servida, Feliz caño nuevo, Flor de pito, Boeing-Boeing, Sin comerla ni beberla, 14 millones, Clavado en París, Citas Peligrosas, El Plan, Siddharta, buscando la verdad La Mentirita Andate Amor Mio! and SWITCH -Todos podemos cambiar.

As a director, he has over twenty titles to his credit, including: Mi tío es un travieso, Historia de varieté, El champán las pone mimosas in its versions (2007-2008 and the 2014 national tour), El enterrador, Una familia poco normal, Pobres pero casi honradas, No somos santas, Le referí cornud, Una Noche Excepcional, 14 millones, Venecia, Sin comerla ni beberla, Shock-Shock, Tu cola me suena, Regatos salvajes, Clavado en París, Bombones y champán, Mujeres de ceniza, El Plan, Despedida de casado, Citas Peligrosas La Mentirita, Beto Cesar de papel, Andate Amor Mio!, Las de Barranco, SWITCH - Todos podemos cambiar and P.O.C.O - Nadie es capaz de tanto.

== Honours ==
Bertrand was awarded eight Carlos Awards (award given by the Municipality of Villa Carlos Paz to distinguish outstanding figures each summer), five as an actor (2004-2005-2010-2011 and 2017), two as a director (2006 and 2017) and one as an Author (2019). His first independent production, "Mi tío es un travieso" (My Uncle is Naughty), holds the record for the most Carlos Awards (8) awarded to a single comedy. He founded a small theater production company with his wife.

During the summer of 2010–2011, he starred in the comedy "Flor de pito" and was awarded his fifth Carlos Award for "Best Leading Actor in a Comedy."

In 2014, he received his first Estrella de Mar Award nomination for "Leading Actor in a Comedy" for his work in "Clavado en París." He directed and starred in the national tour of "El champagne las pone mimosas."

In 2016, he was nominated again for the Estrella de Mar Award for his work in "Citas Peligrosas."

In 2017, he won the Carlos Award for "Leading Actor" and also for "Director" for his work at the helm of "Citas Peligrosas," a play that also won "Best Comedy" and in which he co-wrote the bill with his mother María Rosa Fugazot.

In 2019, he joined the cast of "El Plan," a play he stars in, directed, and co-wrote, and won three Carlos Awards at the Carlos Paz Awards and the Silver Carlos Award for "Best Comedy Drama." In May of that same year, he joined the musical comedy Siddharta, invited by Flavio Mendoza, to play the role of THE FATHER, in what was his first foray into the genre.

During the 2021 season, he returned to Carlos Paz at the Teatro del Lago to star in and direct the comedy La Mentirita, in which he shared the bill with Freddy Villarreal and Iliana Calabro.

In 2022, she wrote, directed, and starred in the play Andate Amor Mío presented at the Zorba Theater in Carlos Paz, with Paula Morales and Belén Giménez, who won a Carlos Award for "best female performance in a supporting role" among the 5 nominations the comedy received.

In 2023, he wrote the play "Switch: We Can All Change" with Nicolás Yannicelli, which he directed and starred in. It was presented at the Teatro del Sol in Carlos Paz from December 27 of that year. The play received 8 nominations for the Carlos Awards, where Bertrand was awarded a special one by the jury. He also received the Estrella de Concert award for "best direction" and "best comedy", as well as the Silver Estrella de Concert. The play was presented in Buenos Aires at the Picadilly Theater from 18 September to 29 November 2024.
