= Hotel de señoritas =

- Directed by: Enrique Dawi
- Written by: Angel Acciaresi, Ángel Cortese
- Edited by: Remo Charbonello
- Release date: 18 October 1979
- Running time: 90 minutes
- Country: Argentina
- Language: Spanish

Hotel de señoritas is a 1979 Argentine comedy film directed by Enrique Dawi.

== Cast ==
- Jorge Martínez
- Juan Carlos Dual
- Elena Sedova
- Patricia Dal
- Gogó Andreu
- Rudy Chernicoff
- Vicente Rubino
- Nené Malbrán
- Toto Rey
- Alberto Irizar
- Adriana Quevedo
- Marta Albertini
- Carmen Barbieri
- Marcos Zucker
- Mario Sapag
