= El Gordo catástrofe =

- Directed by: Hugo Moser
- Written by: Hugo Moser; Jorge Porcel (story)
- Starring: Jorge Porcel; Graciela Alfano; Moria Casán
- Cinematography: Víctor Hugo Caula
- Edited by: Carlos Julio Piaggio
- Music by: Oscar Cardozo Ocampo
- Release date: 1977
- Running time: 105 minutes
- Country: Argentina
- Language: Spanish

El Gordo catástrofe is a 1977 Argentine comedy film written and directed by Hugo Moser and starring Jorge Porcel and Moria Casán.

== Cast ==
- Jorge Porcel as Catrasca
- Moria Casán as Dr. Linda Winters
- Graciela Alfano as Graciela
- Osvaldo Terranova as Dr. Galindez
- Adolfo García Grau as Don Carlos
- Beto Gianola as Igor
- Perla Caron as Tamara
- Nathán Pinzón
- Juan Carlos Galván
- Jacques Arndt
- Max Berliner
- John O'Connell
- Tony Middleton
- Horacio Nicolai
- Juan Vitali
- Fernando Iglesias
- María Bufano
- Délfor Medina
- Anita Bobasso la viejita
- Inés Murray as Anciana
- Jesús Pampín
- Cayetano Biondo
- Abel Sáenz Buhr
- Alicia Muñiz
- Alberto Olmedo as himself
