= Polémica en el bar =

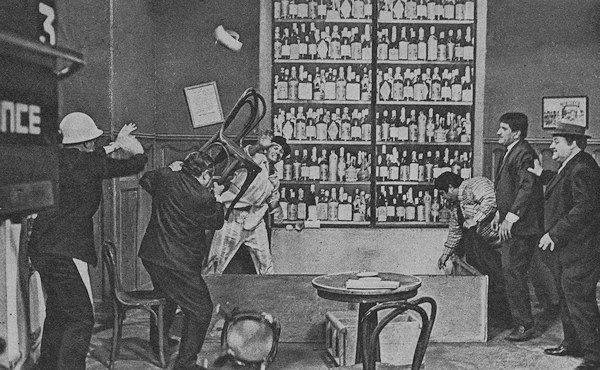
- Genre: Comedy
- Created by: Gerardo Sofovich
- Starring: Gerardo Sofovich; Juan Carlos Altavista; Jorge Porcel
- Theme music composer: Jorge Vazquez
- Opening theme: "Cafetín de Buenos Aires" by Jorge Vazquez
- Composer: Jorge Vazquez
- Country of origin: Argentina
- Original language: Spanish

Production
- Production location: Buenos Aires

Original release
- Network: El Trece; Telefe; América TV; El Nueve; ATC
- Release: 1963 – 2010

Polémica en el bar is an Argentine television series, starring Gerardo Sofovich.

== Premise ==
Polémica en el bar features a group of comedians gathered in a bar, seated around a round table. They engage in discussions on various topics including football, politics, and show business, often sparking controversies and lively debates.

== Production ==
Polémica en el bar was first introduced in 1963 as a sketch of the comedy program Operación Ja-Ja. The sketch featured Gerardo Sofovich, Juan Carlos Altavista, Jorge Porcel, Carlos Carella, and Rodolfo Crespi, portraying individuals engaged in discussions on modern issues while seated around a bar table. Alberto Irízar played the owner of the bar, while Vicente La Russa the waiter. The program had a positive receptionand became a regular segment of the show for several years.

The sketch was promoted to a standalone program in 1972, featuring Sofovich, Altavista, Porcel, Javier Portales, Adolfo García Grau and Fidel Pintos. Most episodes got nearly sixty rating points. However, over the years, the cast underwent changes, with newer comedians often lacking the same level of skill as the original members. The program aired until 2010, with the final line-up being Sofovich, Guillermo Marconi, René Bertrand, Sergio Gonal, Horacio Pagani and Guillermo Miguel.

Gerardo Sofovich died in 2015. His son, Gustavo Sofovich, made a reboot of the program the following year, also titled Polémica en el bar.
