= A los cirujanos se les va la mano =

1980 Argentine comedy film by Hugo Sofovich

- Directed by: Hugo Sofovich
- Written by: Hugo Sofovich
- Starring: Alberto Olmedo; Jorge Porcel; Susana Giménez; Moria Casán
- Cinematography: Horacio Maira
- Edited by: Carlos Julio Piaggio; Eduardo López
- Music by: Oscar Cardozo Ocampo
- Release date: 19 June 1980 (Argentina)
- Running time: 90 minutes
- Country: Argentina
- Language: Spanish

A los cirujanos se les va la mano is a 1980 Argentine comedy film directed and written by Hugo Sofovich. Released in Argentina on 19 June 1980, it stars Alberto Olmedo, Jorge Porcel, Susana Giménez and Moria Casán.

== Plot ==
At a hospital in Buenos Aires, two orderlies, Alberto and Jorge, pose as surgeons in order to seduce two newly qualified doctors. Their deception is eventually tested when an emergency forces them to confront the consequences of the scheme.

== Cast ==
- Alberto Olmedo
- Jorge Porcel
- Susana Giménez
- Moria Casán

== Legacy ==
In a 2003 obituary for Sofovich, Página/12 grouped the film among the director's light, farcical comedies made with Olmedo, Porcel, Giménez and Casán. In a 2025 scholarly overview of Argentine film comedy, Lucía Rodríguez Riva identified the film as part of the Olmedo–Porcel comedy cycle and noted that it had already been the subject of a semiotic study by Oscar Traversa in 1984. The Sofovich-directed films starring Olmedo and Porcel have also been discussed in English-language scholarship.
