= Los caballeros de la cama redonda =

- Directed by: Gerardo Sofovich; Hugo Sofovich
- Written by: Gerardo Sofovich; Hugo Sofovich
- Starring: Jorge Porcel and Alberto Olmedo
- Cinematography: Américo Hoss
- Edited by: Oscar Montauti
- Music by: Jorge López Ruiz; Óscar López Ruiz
- Distributed by: Aries Cinematográfica Argentina
- Release date: March 22, 1973
- Running time: 105 minute
- Country: Argentina
- Language: Spanish

Los caballeros de la cama redonda (English: Round bed knights) is a 1973 Argentine comedy film directed and written by Gerardo Sofovich and Hugo Sofovich. The film starred Jorge Porcel and Alberto Olmedo.

== Release ==
The film premiered in Argentina on March 22, 1973.

== Cast ==
- Jorge Porcel
- Alberto Olmedo
- Chico Novarro
- Tristán
- Adolfo García Grau
- Mimí Pons
- Mariquita Gallegos
- Haydée Padilla
- Elida Marchetta
- Marcos Zucker
- Carmen Morales
- María Rosa Fugazot
- Fidel Pintos
- Eloísa Cañizares
- Délfor
- Moria Casán
- Tita Coello
- Marcia Bell
- Hector Doldi
- Javier Portales
- Gabriela Acher
