= Ché OVNI =

- Ché OVNI theatrical poster
- Directed by: Aníbal Uset
- Written by: Augusto Giustozzi; Aníbal Uset
- Produced by: Delfor María Beccaglia
- Starring: Juan Carlos Altavista; Javier Portales; Jorge Sobral; Marcela López Rey
- Cinematography: Ignacio Souto
- Edited by: Jacinto Cascales; Miguel Ángel Muñoz Cabrera
- Music by: Óscar López Ruiz; Sergio Mihanovich
- Distributed by: Artistas Argentinos Asociados
- Release date: August 7, 1968 (Argentine theatrical)
- Running time: 85 minutes
- Country: Argentina
- Language: Spanish

Ché OVNI is a 1968 Argentine science-fiction musical comedy film directed by Aníbal Uset and starring Juan Carlos Altavista, Javier Portales, Jorge Sobral, and Marcela López Rey.

== Background ==
Ché OVNI was only the second space film to be made in Argentina, after El Satelite Chiflado (The Crazy Satellite). The film is about alien invaders who abduct a tango-singer. OVNI means "UFO"; a newspaper article from the Cine Herald, July 17, 1968, depicted a cartoon Martian landing in the capital of Spain" a part of the promotion to the film.

== Plot ==
An alien envoy arrives on Earth to kidnap a porteño tango singer and she is taken to planet where there is no live. She and other aliens of the planet wish to feel love again and the computers inform her that she is well-suited to trying to accomplish this, and results in a series of tango performances. The aliens fall in love with the tango singer Jorge (Jorge Sobral).

== Principal cast ==
- Juan Carlos Altavista as Juan
- Javier Portales as Professor
- Jorge Sobral as Jorge
- Marcela López Rey as Cósmica
- Erika Wallner as Rubia
- Perla Caron as Amarilla
- Zelmar Gueño as Pierre

== Reception ==
Shot on locations in London, Paris, Madrid and Buenos Aires, the film was considered "one of the most thunderous commercial failures" in Argentine film. However, Augusto R. Giustozzi said that Jorge Sobral "excelled" in his role.
