= Encuentros muy cercanos con señoras de cualquier tipo =

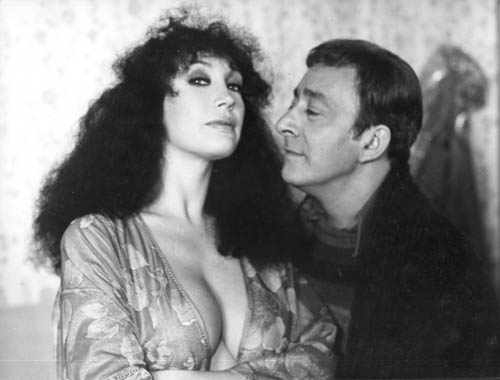
- Moria Casan and Alberto Olmedo in a scene from the film
- Release date: 1978
- Running time: 92 minute
- Country: Argentina
- Language: Spanish

Encuentros muy cercanos con señoras de cualquier tipo is a 1978 Argentine film.

== Cast ==
- Adriana Aguirre
- Moria Casan
- Alberto Olmedo
- Jorge Porcel
