= Custodio de señoras =

1979 film by Hugo Sofovich

- Directed by: Hugo Sofovich
- Release date: 5 April 1979
- Running time: 90 minute
- Country: Argentina
- Language: Spanish

Custodio de señoras (transl. Custodian of ladies) is a 1979 Argentine comedy film directed by Hugo Sofovich.

== Cast ==
- Jorge Porcel ... Jorge
- Graciela Alfano
- Javier Portales

=== Supporting ===
- Anita Almada
- Raquel María Alvarez
- Cacho Bustamante
- Osvaldo Castro
- Remedios Climent
- Roberto Dairiens
- Horacio Dener
- Coco Fossati
- Hellen Grant
- Lalo Hartich
- Alberto Irizar
- Miguel Jordán
- Maurice Jouvet
- Mónica Lander
- Augusto Larreta
- Alberto Olmedo
- Raúl Ricutti
- Carlos Rotundo
- Gloria Ugarte
- Emilio Vidal
