= Moria Casán =

Argentine actress and TV personality

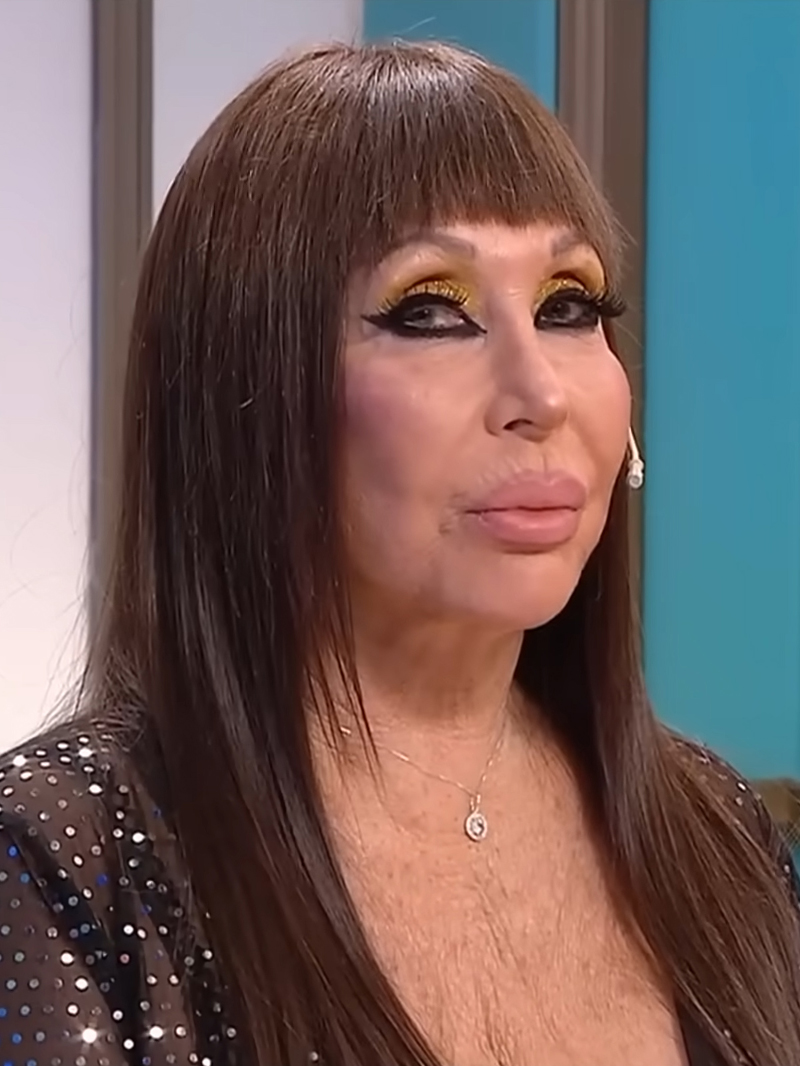
- Casán in 2023
- Born: Ana María Casanova; August 16, 1946 (age 80); Buenos Aires, Argentina
- Occupations: Actress, presenter, theatre producer, TV personality, talent manager
- Years active: 1971–present
- Spouse: Mario Castiglione (m. 1986; div. 1990)
- Children: Sofía Gala

Signature
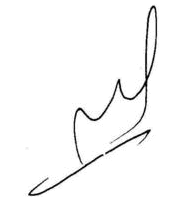

Ana María Casanova (born August 16, 1946), known by her stage name Moria Casán, is an Argentine actress and TV personality. Casán made her theatre debut in 1971 as a model in the show Nerón Vuelve in the theater El Nacional, and later became one of the country's leading vedettes in the revista porteña. Her sex symbol status was further cemented during the late 1970s and 1980s, as she starred in various sexual comedy films alongside Alberto Olmedo, Jorge Porcel and Susana Giménez. Since the mid-1980s, Casán has also established herself as an important TV personality, hosting various sketch comedy programs and talk shows throughout the years. Most recently, Casán was a judge in the popular TV competition Bailando por un Sueño from 2006 to 2017. She currently hosts the TV show Incorrectas and continues starring in several theatrical productions.

Casán remains a popular figure in Argentine showbusiness. Her insult comedy and off-color humor, popularized through her usual feuds with other media personalities, has generated various catchphrases that have become part of popular culture—the press has nicknamed her "karateka tongue". In 2013, the Buenos Aires Herald wrote that "[her] larger than life persona is a pop icon as much for her stage performances as for her bold, daring public statements." Casán is also "the great gay icon of the country", and a fixture in national LGBT culture; as the community sees "her as an icon of liberation and transgression." Her only daughter, Sofía Gala, is also an actress.

== Career ==
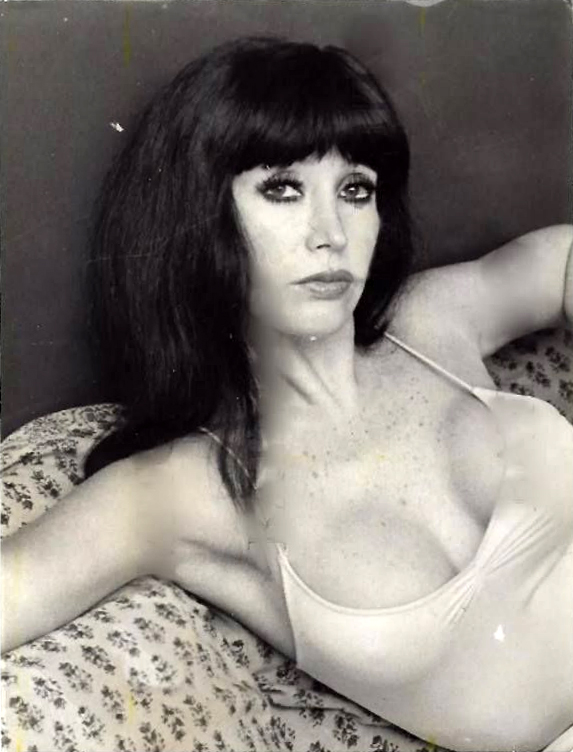
Casán in the 1970s

Casán was born in Buenos Aires. Following in the footsteps of Argentine revue diva Nélida Roca, Moria Casán became a stage sex symbol and chorus girl. She started as a dancer but immediately acquired major roles due to her versatility, powerful voice and on-screen presence. She worked with outstanding revue actors during the 1970s, such as Nélida Lobato, Adolfo Stray, Don Pelele, Pablo Barbieri, Juan Verdaguer, and José Marrone. She was the first revue girl to demand to leave sexual comments directed at her person off the stage, and to be placed at an equal level with a man. This significant change revolutionized the revue genre locally, and numerous prospective female stars took their cues from Casán in subsequent years.

Moria Casan was asked to express her opinion about a wide spectrum of topics in most of the country's leisure magazines. She became known for her musical shows and on television as a TV hostess and producer. She was the first to have the protagonist role in music halls on TV, both as dancer and actress. Most of her film career has been made up of sexual comedies, acting with well-known comedians as Alberto Olmedo, Jorge Porcel, and her friend, Susana Giménez. She married fellow actor Mario Castiglione in 1986, with whom she had a daughter, and, following an acrimonious divorce, remarried with Luis Vadalá.

Casán became among the most recognizable figures in Argentine television, and hosted numerous local variety shows since Monumental Moria in 1989, including A la cama con Moria in the early 1990s (in which guests were interviewed in a suggestively ample, round bed), Amor y Moria (Love and Moria) in the late '90s, and her 2000 talk show, Entre Moria y Vos (Between Moria and You). She has also appeared in the theatre, notably in Santiago Moncada's Brujas (Witches), between 1991 and 1996, alongside Nora Cárpena, Susana Campos, Thelma Biral and Graciela Dufau. Casán ran a much-publicized, though unsuccessful, 2005 campaign for a seat in the lower house of Argentina's National Congress, the Chamber of Deputies, on the Movimiento Federal de Centro, a new center-right party she created.

After many years in the entertainment industry, Moria evolved into a "show woman" – a Latin American term for a woman who can actually perform, rather than being a mere sex symbol – based on her multi-faceted talent and a peculiar phrasing that became popular among people of all ages. Her later appearances included those in the popular sitcom, Doble vida, and in recurring seasons of Bailando por un Sueño (Dancing for a Dream), where she appeared between 2006 and 2008 as a contest judge. Remaining active in the theatre, in 2009 she performed in Une visite inopportune, by local playwright Copi, and directed by the French dramatist Stéphan Druet. She has also established a restaurant and an actors' and dancing school, the Escuela de Arte Moria Casán.

=== Moria's iconic phrases ===
Among the phrases she popularized are:

- "Si queres llorar, llorá" (If you wanna cry, cry - meaning: afterwards you must go on with life as usual)
- "Mis neuronas tienen clítoris" (my nerve cells have clitorises)
- "Soy una ajedrecista de la dialéctica" (I am a chess player of dialectics - meaning: my answers can be very dangerous)
- "Se cuelgan de mis tetas" (They cling to my tits - meaning: they’re trying to cash in on my fame)
- "Comen mortadela y eructan caviar" (They eat mortadella and burp caviar - meaning: they try to feign a level of sophistication they lack)
- "Sos un helado de pollo, ¡no existís!" (You’re like chicken ice cream—you don’t even exist!)
- "Grasa como sushi de bagre" (As vulgar as catfish sushi)
- "A la vida no la vivo, me la c..." (I don’t live life—I f**k it)
- "¿Qué se puede esperar de un burro más que una patada?" (What else can you expect from a donkey but a kick? - meaning: if someone is a certain way, it’s predictable that they’ll do something like that)
- "¿Quiénes son?" (Who are they? - meaning: they're plain good-for-nothings)
- "A-hora!" (right now!)
- "¡Te lo pido por favor!" (I beg you!)
- "Se colgaron de nuevo" (they're hung-up again)
- "What pass? qué pasa papi?" ('what pass,' what's up, daddy?)
- "Cuando fumo me siento una geisha" (when I smoke, I feel like a geisha)
- "Soy el obelisco con tetas" (I am the obelisk with tits)

== Filmography ==
Film
Year	Title	Role	Notes
1973	Los doctores las prefieren desnudas	Patient who gets injection	
1973	Los caballeros de la cama redonda	Olga	
1974	Clínica con música		
1977	El gordo catástrofe	Linda Winters	
1978	Con mi mujer no puedo		
1978	Encuentros muy cercanos con señoras de cualquier tipo		
1979	Expertos en pinchazos	Fabiana	
1980	Así no hay cama que aguante		
1980	Los hijos de López		
1980	A los cirujanos se les va la mano	Moria Monteverde	
1981	Las mujeres son cosa de guapos	"La mendocina"	
1981	Amante para dos	Mónica Méndez	
1981	Te rompo el rating	Moria Gutiérrez	
1981	Un terceto peculiar	Sonia Dupont	
1983	Se acabó el curro		
1985	El telo y la tele	Moria	
1986	Brigada explosiva contra los ninjas	Margarita Zavaleta	
1986	Brigada explosiva	Margarita Zavaleta	
1993	Funes, un gran amor		
2011	Cruzadas	Juana Pérez Roble	Also executive producer
