= Gloria Ugarte =

Argentine film and television actress

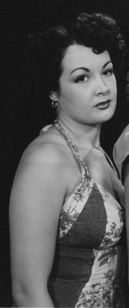
- Born: Argentina
- Died: 1995; Argentina
- Occupation: Actress
- Years active: 1940–1991 (film)

Gloria Ugarte was an Argentine film and television actress. She often played vampish roles. Ugarte was married to the actors Zerpa Fabio and Mario Faig.

== Partial filmography ==
- Del cuplé al tango (1958)
- La Casa de Madame Lulù (1968)
- Custodio de señoras (1979)
- Amante para dos (1981)

== Bibliography ==
- Vega, Hugo F. Televisión Argentina: 1951-1975: La Información. Ediciones del Jilguero, 2001.
