= Carlos García (pianist) =

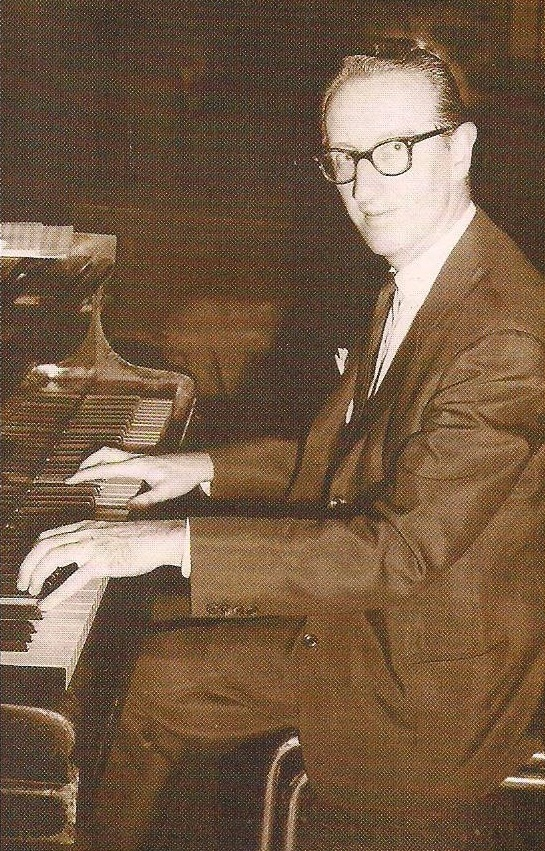

Background information
- Born: Carlos Juan Pedro García Echeverry; 21 April 1914; Argentina
- Died: 4 August 2006 (aged 92) Argentina
- Genres: Tango, folklore
- Occupations: Musician, composer, arranger, conductor
- Instrument: Piano

Carlos Juan Pedro García Echeverry (21 April 1914 – 4 August 2006) was an Argentine pianist, conductor, composer, and arranger.

== Early life and education ==
He grew up in the city of Buenos Aires, in the San Cristóbal neighborhood, and between 1920 and 1926, he began his first music studies with Mariano Domínguez. Later on, he refined his piano skills, studying harmony, counterpoint, fugue, composition, and orchestration with maestro Pedro Rubbione (1929–1969).

== Career ==
As a teenager, he accompanied silent film screenings on the piano during the transitional period toward sound films, marking his first work experiences. After beginning his professional activities in 1926, in 1932 he joined Roberto Firpo’s Typical Orchestra and the typical trio, replacing Sebastián Piana, which accompanied Mercedes Simone (between 1936 and 1938 in recordings and live performances). Then, until 1946, he dedicated himself to Argentine and American folk music and was part of the Hawaiian Serenaders orchestra, Efraín Orozco Morales' group, and supported the folk duo Martínez-Ledesma.

Around the same years, he was the pianist for Alberto Castellanos' orchestra on LR1 Radio El Mundo. From 1946 to 1960, he devoted himself to teaching and had some performances as a soloist and accompanist to prominent singers. Starting in 1960, he worked as a musical advisor for LS1 Radio Municipal and later for the EMI Odeón record label until 1983. Among his extensive discography, solo piano records and the recording of Orchestra and Guitar together with Roberto Grela stand out.

In the 1970s, he led his orchestra, Tango All Stars, on a tour through forty cities in Japan, in addition to tours throughout the country and abroad. He was accompanied by prominent singers whom he directed on tours, concerts, and recordings: Héctor Pacheco, Ramona Galarza, Alberto Marino, Alfredo Zitarrosa, Rubén Juárez, Oscar Alonso, Claudio Bergé, Francisco Llanos, Guillermo Fernández, Argentino Ledesma, Alberto Merlo, among others. In 1978, he was part of a group of 55 musicians at the Presidente Alvear Municipal Theater in the series "Tangos for the World."

Starting in 1980, he began directing the Buenos Aires Tango Orchestra until his death, co-directed by Raúl Garello. He was also responsible for the musical arrangements of the most traditional tangos performed by that orchestra. In national cinema, he provided the music for several Argentine films: Hormiga negra (dir.: Ricardo Alberto Defilippi, 1979), La canción de Buenos Aires (dir.: Fernando Siro, 1980). As a composer, notable works include "Al maestro con nostalgia," "Ayúdame Buenos Aires," "Balcón," "Mi estrella azul," "Racconto" with lyrics by Margarita Durán, and "Terrenal," among others.

He appeared with his orchestra in the documentary film Café de los maestros (2008), directed by Miguel Kohan, and in the albums Café de los Maestros Vol. 1 and 2 (2005), produced by Gustavo Santaolalla, in which he recorded "Al maestro con nostalgia," a piece in homage to Carlos di Sarli.

== Awards ==
In 1985, he received the Konex Award, with a diploma of merit as Conductor of a Orquesta típica in the Popular Music category.

== Bibliography ==
- Torres, Leda. Carlos García – Tangos en piano Volumen I [Carlos García – Tangos on Piano Volume I] (in Spanish). Mil Campanas. ISBN 9789874587336.
