= La Casa de Madame Lulù =

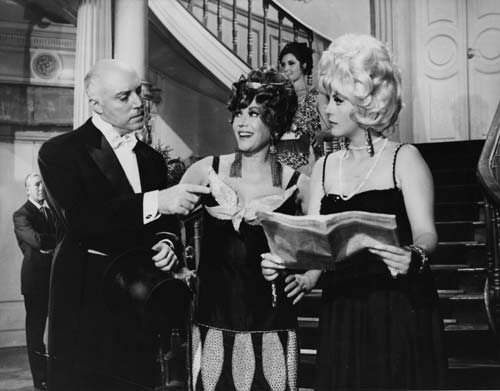
- Film still
- Directed by: Julio Porter
- Written by: Julio Porter, Diego Santillian
- Starring: Libertad Leblanc, Juan Carlos Altavista, and Alberto Anchart
- Cinematography: Mario Pagyés
- Edited by: Óscar Esparza
- Music by: Lucio Milena
- Production company: Tachis Films
- Distributed by: Federal SRL
- Release date: 1968
- Running time: 80 min.
- Country: Argentina
- Language: Spanish

La Casa de Madame Lulù is a black and white 1968 Argentine comedy directed by Julio Porter.

== Premise ==
In the 1930s, a young revolutionary falls for a seemingly innocent and beautiful girl, only to discover she works in a brothel.

== Cast ==
- Libertad Leblanc as Maria La Pompadour
- Juan Carlos Altavista as Pepe
- Alberto Anchart as Renzo
- Elvia Andreoli (credited as Elvia Evans)
- Santiago Bal
- Osvaldo Canónico
- Tita Coello
- Hugo Dargo
- Jorge De La Riestra
- Maurice Jouvet
- Elena Lucena as Madame Lulú
- Lalo Malcolm
- Tino Pascali
- Fidel Pintos
- Vicente Rubino as President Liga de Moralidad
- Susana Rubio
- Tristán
- Gloria Ugarte
- Emilio Vidal
- Enzo Viena as Pichoncito Fontana
