= Nelly Láinez =

Argentine actress

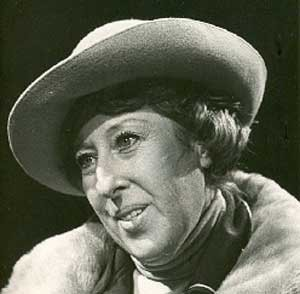
- Born: Nélida Rotstein; 1920; Buenos Aires, Argentina
- Died: 31 May 2008 (aged 88); Buenos Aires, Argentina
- Occupation: comedic actress

Nelly Láinez (1920 – 31 May 2008) was an Argentine comedic actress, best known for her performances in a string of unusually titled Argentine comedic films and television shows such as Vampires Prefer Fatties (Los vampiros los prefieren gorditos) in 1974.

== Life ==
Láinez was born Nélida Rotstein in Buenos Aires in 1920. She made her acting debut in a comedic radio role when she was just 12 years old. She made her acting debut in the Carlos Schliepper's film Fascinación (Fascination) in 1949. At the age of 20 Láinez participated in Cinco grandes y una chica (Five Men and a Girl) and went on to appear in Cinco locos en la pista (Five Crazies on the Floor), which was released in 1950. She ultimately appeared in over twenty other Argentinian films throughout her career, including Amigos para La Aventura (Love at First Sight), a 1956 tango-themed musical.

Her television credits included La Tuerca and Operacion Ja Ja, both of which aired during the 1980s. During the 1990s, Láinez appeared in El mundo de Antonio Gasalla and El palacio de la risa. She won a Martín Fierro award for best comedic actress in 1993 for her performance on El palacio de la risa.

Nelly Láinez died of a urinary tract infection on 31 May 2008 in Buenos Aires; she was 88 years old at the time she died.

== Filmography ==
- Gran Valor en la Facultad de Medicina (1981)
- ¿Los piolas no se casan...? (1981)
- Madrina
- Gran valor (1980)
- Madre de Abel
- La obertura (1977)
- Tú me enloqueces (1976)
- Los chiflados dan el golpe (1975)
- Los vampiros los prefieren gorditos (1974)
- El bulín (1969)
- Villa Cariño está que arde (1968)
- Cuando los hombres hablan de mujeres (1967)
- Santiago querido! (1965)
- Canuto Cañete y los 40 ladrones (1964)
- Mujer asustada
- Cristóbal Colón en la Facultad de Medicina (1962)
- Amor a primera vista (1956)
- La mujer desnuda (1955)
- Suegra último modelo (1953)
- La mejor del colegio (1953)
- Vigilantes y ladrones (1952)
- Camelia
- Especialista en señoras (1951)
- Cuidado con las mujeres (1951)
- Pocholo, Pichuca y yo (1951)
- La vida color de rosa (1951)
- Cinco locos en la pista (1950)
- Cinco grandes y una chica (1950)
