= List of Argentine films of 1987 =

The following films were produced in Argentina in the year 1987.

Argentine films of 1987
| Title | Director | Release | Genre | Notes |
A - E
| El año del conejo | Fernando Ayala | 13 August | Comedy, Drama | |
| Los Bañeros más locos del mundo | Carlos Galettini | 5 February | Comedy | |
| Catch the Heat | Joel Silberg | 1986 (Argentina) | Action | Also known as Sin escape ("No Escape"); released in 1986 in Argentina and 1987 in USA. |
| Chorros | Jorge Coscia and Guillermo Saura | 11 September | | |
| La Clínica del Dr. Cureta | Alberto Fischerman | 6 August | Comedy | |
| Los colimbas al ataque | Enrique Carreras | 12 February | Comedy | |
| Los corruptores | Teo Kofman | 13 August | | |
| Debajo del mundo | Beda Docampo Feijóo and Juan Bautista Stagnaro | 16 April | Drama, Historical, Biographical | |
| El dueño del sol | Rodolfo Mórtola | 11 June | | |
| Los dueños del silencio | Carlos Lemos | 2 April | Drama | |
| En el nombre del hijo | Jorge Polaco | 1 October | | |
| Las esclavas | Carlos Borcosque (hijo) | 21 May | | |
F - M
| Galería del terror | Enrique Carreras | 2 September | Comedy | |
| El Hombre de la deuda externa | Pablo Olivo | 26 March | Drama | |
| Hombre mirando al sudeste | Eliseo Subiela | 2 April | Drama, Science Fiction | |
| Ico, el caballito valiente | Manuel García Ferré | 9 July | Animation, Family Film | |
| Johnny Tolengo, el majestuoso | Gerardo Sofovich and Enrique Dawi | 16 July | Comedy, Family Film | |
| El lado oscuro | Gonzalo Suárez | 21 May | | |
| Made in Argentina | Juan José Jusid | 14 May | Drama | |
| El Manosanta está cargado | Hugo Sofovich | 4 June | Comedy | |
| Los matamonstruos en la mansión del terror | Carlos Galettini | 2 July | Comedy | |
| Memorias y olvidos | Simón Feldman | 13 August | | |
| Me sobra un marido | Gerardo Sofovich | 23 April | Comedy | |
| El misterio Eva Perón | Tulio Demicheli | 18 June | | |
| Mujer-Mujer | Bernardo Arias | 6 August | | |
N - Z
| Obsesión de venganza | Emilio Vieyra | 14 May | Action | |
| Prontuario de un argentino | Andrés Bufali | 14 May | | |
| Relación prohibida | Ricardo Suñez | 22 October | | |
| Revancha de un amigo | Santiago Carlos Oves | 11 June | | |
| Sentimientos o Mirta, de Liniers a Estambul | Jorge Coscia and Guillermo Saura | 21 May | | |
| Sofía | Alejandro Doria | 16 April | Drama | |
| Susana quiere, el negro también! | Julio De Grazia | 7 May | Comedy | |
| Los taxistas del humor | Vicente Viney | 28 May | Comedy | |
| Traición y venganza o The Stranger | Adolfo Aristarain | 1986 (USA) | Thriller, Suspense | |
| La virgen gaucha | Abel Rubén Beltrami | 2 April | | |

== External links and references ==
- Argentine films of 1987 at the Internet Movie Database
