= Landismo =

Spanish film genre

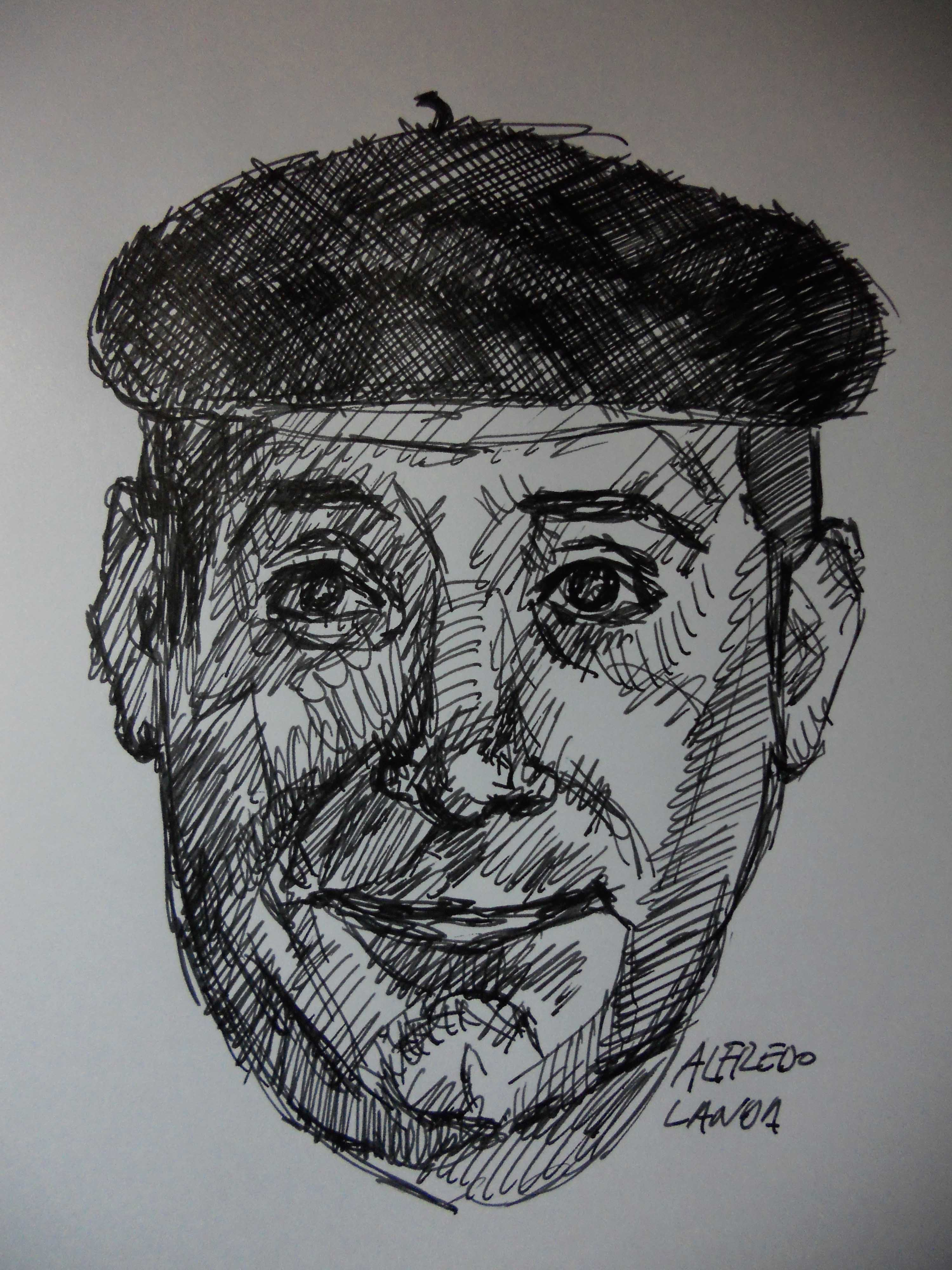
Sketch of actor Alfredo Landa characterized with a beret as if he were one of his characters of rural origin.

Landismo is the name of a phenomenon and a low-brow genre or subgenre of Spanish cinema which happened largely in the 1970s, whose name is given to Alfredo Landa (the most represented and highlighted actor of the genre), which mixes easy comedy with low-intensity eroticism. At its apex, this genre was known as cine de ligue (flirt film) because the comedy scenes centered on sexual conquest, especially from foreign tourists.

It approximately coincides with the time where there were similar phenomena in other countries, such as the Argentine sex comedy, Brazil's pornochanchadas, sexy or spicy Commedia all'italiana or the Mexican sexycomedias. In the Spanish case the censorship practices of the last few years of Francoism played an important role in the appearance and the characteristics of the landismo genre or subgenre, restrictions where cine de destape in later years could not worry with.

== History ==
=== Origins, description and rise ===
The term landismo refers to a series of films starring Alfredo Landa (1933–2012) during a period of his career, which goes from approximately the mid-1960s to 1978. This type of film belongs to the genre of situation comedy and scripts, especially the "sexy comedy"; the real heir of the revues of the time and its eroticism accompanied by brief theatrical scenes or comedy/satirical sketches. In fact, it was common for some vedettes to take part of the film claims of these comedies. It is also understood that most of these landist films had influence from Italian comedies which combined costumbrismo, social affairs and spicy moments, already since the early 60s.

Some Spanish film precedents of landismo can already be seen in Bahía de Palma (1962), in the secondary role of a flirter played by Cassen which also included the first on-screen bikini in Spanish cinema from German actress Elke Sommer, or more clearly since the middle of the decade with films such as Vacaciones para Ivette (1964), Ninette y un señor de Murcia (1965), Un beso en el puerto (1965), Amor a la española (1967) or 40 grados a la sombra (1967) in which, although some weren't starred by Landa, there were already tourists or foreigners perceived by Spaniards as an important part of comedy and the romantic scripts.

A classic example of cine de ligue or landismo that can be cited is No desearás al vecino del quinto (1970), a successful film directed by Tito Fernández which broke box office records. Other significant samples would be, according to Flixolé: El alma se serena (1970), Aunque la hormona se vista de seda (1971), ¡Vente a Alemania, Pepe! (1971), Vente a ligar al Oeste (1972), París bien vale una moza (1972), Simón, contamos contigo (1972), Manolo la nuit (1973), Lo verde empieza en los Pirineos (1973), Fin de semana al desnudo (1974), Dormir y ligar: todo es empezar (1974), Jenaro, el de los 14 (1974), Mayordomo para todo (1976), Celedonio y yo somos así (1977), and many others.

This type of films reflected, in a comedic tone, the problems, anxieties and social environments the Spanish society was facing in the last years of Francoism and the first few years of the Spanish transition to democracy. Especially most of them emphasized the certain sexual repression of them en in which Landa represented the archetype of an Iberian macho, which personified the values of the last phase of Francoism facing the opening ideals coming from abroad. This stereotype, portrayed by several actors, pretended to represent the common Spaniard of that time: a low-stature, tan, hairy-bodied man, with machist attitudes and centered on sexual conquest.

In these comedies, the protagonist was a middle or middle-lower class Spaniard, complexed by values coming from abroad and obsessed with suecas (literally "Swedes"), that is, any foreign young woman. The suecas were the symbol of financial prosperity and political and sexual freedoms the Spaniards of the time dreamt of. The screenplay of these films would also often parody topics such as tourism, the rural exodus, emigration, house services or old traditions.

Due to their high popular success, the amount of similar movies featuring this type of sexy comedies and the reach they had in social collective memory, these began to incarnate the concept of españolada of Spanish cinema in those decades and that was used later with negative connotations. So much so that, at times, the landismo films and españolada (late Francoism) were used as similar concepts.

Directors Mariano Ozores, Pedro Lazaga, Luis María Delgado and Fernando Merino were prolific in this phase, and, in addition to Landa, actors such as José Luis López Vázquez, José Sacristán, Manolo Gómez Bur, Antonio Ozores, Juanjo Menéndez, Fernando Fernán Gómez, Cassen, Saza, Arturo Fernández, Paco Martínez Soria, Manolo Escobar, Antonio Garisa, Gracita Morales, Josele Román, Rafaela Aparicio, Florinda Chico, Laly Soldevila, Lina Morgan, Esperanza Roy, Tina Sainz, Concha Velasco, Margot Cottens, Pilar Gómez Ferrer, etc. were present in numerous films of this genre. It was also common for landismo to count with the presence of some foreign actresses, which, sometimes, had the role of the modern, liberated European woman, usually in roles of British, Central European or Nordic tourists - the famous suecas - a product of the rise of "sun and beach" tourism of the time, and that almost exclusively appeared on screen in scenes with bikini or light clothes. These included actresses such as Erika Wallner, Ingrid Garbo, Helga Liné, Rosanna Yanni, Mirta Miller, Nadiuska, Claudia Gravy, Gela Geisler, Colette Giacobine, Dyanik Zurakowska, Rosenda Monteros, Ingrid Pitt, Silvia Solar, Aída Power (from Algeciras), etc.

Some directors, such as Manuel Summers, Fernando Fernán Gómez, José María Forqué, Luis García Berlanga or Antonio Drove, also approached their style to landismo or cine de ligue, or focused some of their traits from a more absurd, gagged or reflective perspective in films such as No somos de piedra (1968), ¿Por que te engaña tu marido?, Crimen imperfecto, Estudio amueblado 2.P. (1969), El triangulito (1970), ¡Vivan los novios! (1970) or Mi mujer es muy decente, dentro de lo que cabe (1975). On his behalf, Juan Antonio Bardem also made something similar with El puente (1977) and the Spanish macho archetype without ideology that Landa often played.

=== End of landismo and legacy ===
The end of the landismo phenomenon emerged between 1975 and 1977. On 1 March 1975, even before the death of Franco, the new Censorsip Code noticed that "nude scenes will be admitted as long as it's made by the total unit of the film, rejecting itself when it presents itself with the intent of raising passions in the normal viewer or inciding in pornography". After the death of the dictator and with the end of film censorship (December 1977) with the second Suárez government, "cinemas finally had a slot for films with openly erotic character, under the famous S rating". This enabled that, in those years, eroticism rose in intensity, already with explicit female nude scenes, filming a large amount of films with that focus and new actors came, riding the cine del destape wave, such as Andrés Pajares and Fernando Esteso or Antonio Ozores and Juanito Navarro, picking up several of the key aspects of the landista archetype.

In the transition to democracy, Alfredo Landa started toggling between a film line closer to destape with films such as Historia de 'S' (1979), Polvos mágicos (1979), Profesor eroticus (1981), Préstame tu mujer (1981) or Un Rolls para Hipólito (1982) and other more serious films from directors such as Juan Antonio Bardem or José Luis Garci which showed their versatility, as well as a repairman without ideology which started breaking the landista cliché in El puente (1977), as well as a stressed executive in Las verdes praderas (1979) or as a neo-noir detective in El crack (1981) and El crack Dos (1983). Finally, in 1984, his talent as an actor was recognized abroad when Landa received his trophy at the Cannes Film Festival to receive his Best Actor trophy, ex aequo with Paco Rabal, for his role as a peasant in The Holy Innocents, by Mario Camus.

The natural evolution of landismo in cinema derived largely towards cine de destape by Pajares and Esteso, and, later, borrowed itself to Spanish television, where it recovered the spirit of low-intensity erotic gags from revues in 90s television programs, with the mamachichos of the Spanish edition of Colpo grosso (Tutti Frutti) as a singular example of that phase of television (and which earned Telecinco the nickname "Tele-Teta" or "Teta-Cinco"). Also, most elements of landismo were replicated in some 90s Spanish television series which recovered that type of humor, such as El sexólogo (1994) by Mariano Ozores. Years later, there were some traits of landismo in the Iberian macho clichés of some characters of the Torrente saga, or in series such as Aída (2005–2014) and its character Mauricio Colmenero (Mariano Peña), or in the long-running La que se avecina (2007–present), with, as examples, the roles of Antonio Recio "el rancio" (Jordi Sánchez) or that of Amador Rivas (Pablo Chiapella).

Moreover, the influence of cine de ligue or landista can also be traced into films from the twenty-first century, recreating the age of the rise of tourism and the conquest of tourists, according to the clichés of the subgenre's comedy, such as in the short film Mi tío Paco (2006) by Tacho González, or in the feature films Benidorm mon amour (2016) by Sergio Pumarola, or in Virgins (2025) by Álvaro Díaz Lorenzo, or from a dramatic review in The Europeans (2020) by Víctor García León, adapted from a novel by Rafael Azcona. On the other hand, its conceptual influence and comicity remain present in period comedies: conquest of women in a silly way in Brain Drain (2009); emigration in Off Course (2015); or prostitution in Villaviciosa de al lado (2016), or in those based in a character stuck in the past facing new social norms, such as How to Become a Modern Man (2023) or Uncle Trouble (2024), with Leo Harlem as the role of the typical landista character.

As of 2026, most movies of the landismo subgenre are repeated on television channels or online platforms dedicated to Spanish cinema (FlixOlé, Canal Somos) or in programs such as Cine de barrio or Nuestro cine (Viva el cine español).

== Other uses of the term ==
Since the 2010s, the term landismo has been appropriated to refer to the sports movement related to cyclist Mikel Landa and his large support from followers and Basque fans.
