= Amigos para La Aventura =

1978 film

Amigos para la aventura
- Directed by: Palito Ortega
- Written by: Victor Sueiro
- Starring: Palito Ortega; Carlos Monzón; Juan Carlos Altavista
- Release date: 1978
- Running time: 115 minute
- Country: Argentina
- Language: Spanish

Amigos para la aventura (English language: Friends for the Adventure) is a 1978 Argentine comedy film directed by Palito Ortega and written by Víctor Sueiro.

== Cast ==
- Palito Ortega
- Carlos Monzón
- Juan Carlos Altavista
- Raúl Rossi
- Alberto Anchart
- Vicente La Russa
- Iris Láinez
- Cristina Alberó
- Mercedes Yardín
- Emilio Vidal
- Délfor
- Norberto Draghi
- Isidro Fernán Valdez
- Héctor Gance
- Francisco Gómez
