= List of Argentine films of 1968 =

A list of films produced in Argentina in 1968:

Argentine films of 1968
Title	Director	Release	Genre
A - C
Amor en el aire	Luis César Amadori	29 August	
Asalto en la ciudad	Carlos Cores	3 March	
La cama	Emilio Gómez Muriel	2 September	
Carne	Armando Bó	24 October	
La casa de Madame Lulú	Julio Porter	18 June	
Chao amor	Diego Santillán	19 September	
Ché OVNI	Aníbal E. Uset	7 August	
Coche cama, alojamiento	Julio Porter	29 February	
D - M
El Derecho a la felicidad	Carlos Rinaldi	1 August	drama
Destino para dos	Alberto Du Bois	9 May	
Digan lo que digan	Mario Camus	18 July	
Eeny, Meeny, Miny, Mo (Tute Cabrero)	Juan José Jusid	23 May	
En la selva no hay estrellas	Armando Robles Godoy	5 June	
En mi casa mando yo	Fernando Ayala	4 April	
El gran robo	Rossano Brazzi	17 October	
Humo de marihuana	Lucas Demare	17 May	
Lo prohibido está de moda	Fernando Siro	2 May	
Martín Fierro	Leopoldo Torre Nilsson	4 July	
Maternidad sin hombres	Carlos Rinaldi	7 November	
Matrimonio a la argentina	Enrique Carreras	28 March	
La mujer de mi padre	Armando Bó	25 April	
N - Z
La novela de un joven pobre	Enrique Cahen Salaberry	11 April	
El novicio rebelde	Julio Saraceni	10 October	
Operación San Antonio	Enrique Carreras	6 June	
Palo y hueso	Nicolás Sarquís	7 August	
Psexoanálisis	Héctor Olivera	19 June	
El resurgimiento de una Nación		12 September	Documentary
Las ruteras	Ignacio Tankel	17 October	
Somos los mejores	Federico Padilla	21 November	
Turismo de carretera	Rodolfo Kuhn	27 June	
Una sueca entre nosotros	Fernando Merino	26 September	
Un muchacho como yo	Enrique Carreras	14 March	
Villa Cariño está que arde	Emilio Vieyra	26 September	

== External links and references ==
- Argentine films of 1968 at the Internet Movie Database
