= Count to Ten (film) =

1985 film

- Directed by: Oscar Barney Finn
- Written by: Oscar Barney Finn; Julio Orione
- Produced by: András Elek
- Starring: Oscar Martínez
- Cinematography: Juan Carlos Lenardi
- Edited by: Julio Di Risio
- Production company: Oscar Barney Finn Produccionnes
- Release date: 2 May 1985
- Running time: 100 minutes
- Country: Argentina
- Language: Spanish

Count to Ten (Spanish: Contar hasta diez) is a 1985 Argentine drama film directed by Oscar Barney Finn. It was selected to compete for the Golden Bear at the 35th Berlin International Film Festival.

== Synopsis ==
A man arrives in Buenos Aires to search for his brother who went missing during the military government.

== Cast ==
- Oscar Martínez
- Héctor Alterio
- Arturo Maly as Pedro Vallejos
- María Luisa Robledo
- Julia von Grolman
- Eva Franco
- Arturo Puig
- Selva Alemán
- Olga Zubarry
- China Zorrilla
