= Camila Perissé =

Argentine actress (1954–2024)

Camila Porro Perissé
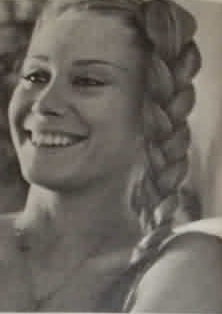
- Perissé in 1981
- Born: 1 January 1954; Mar del Plata, Buenos Aires Province, Argentina
- Died: 27 February 2024 (aged 70); Buenos Aires, Argentina

Camila Porro Perissé (1 January 1954 – 27 February 2024) was an Argentine actress and showgirl. Argentine obituaries described her as "the most desired woman of the 80s" and "an icon of the 80s and 90s".

== Life and career ==
Born in Mar del Plata, at 7 Perissé moved to Buenos Aires, and at young age she started studying dance, getting her diploma as a dance instructor at the age of 15. Orphan of both parents when she was 18, she moved to Europe where she worked as a saleswoman and a chef. Returned to Argentina, she trained as an actress under Carlos Gandolfo, and she made her professional debut on stage in 1976.

Perissé had her breakout in 1981, playing the controversial play La señorita de Tacna by Mario Vargas Llosa, in which she performed a highly publicized full nude, and being the vedette in Tato Bores' political humor television shows. Since the mid-1980s she suffered various vicissitudes, including a long drug addiction and a financial fraud that caused her the loss of her home and most of her earnings. In 1996, she and her companion moved to New York City, where they opened Cafetín, a bar specialized in juices and natural food. In 2001, they moved to Spain and later to England, before making their return in Argentina in 2007.

Perissé's last professional commitment was in 2018, in the play Los maestros. She made her last public appearance in 2019, as a contestant in the television show ¿Quién quiere ser millonario?, in which she eventually won 180,000 pesos. Her final years were difficult, with Perissé facing both financial issues and various health problems, particularly fibromyalgia and Alzheimer's disease. She died of pneumonia on 27 February 2024, at the age of 70.
