= La Chacota =

1962 film

- Directed by: Enrique Dawi
- Cinematography: Humberto Peruzzi
- Edited by: Gerardo Rinaldi
- Release date: 1962
- Running time: 82 minutes
- Country: Argentina
- Language: Spanish

La Chacota is a 1962 Argentine film directed by Enrique Dawi.

== Cast ==
- Luis Aguilé
- Héctor Calcaño
- Oscar Casco
- Augusto Codecá
- Julio De Grazia
- Evangelina Elizondo
- Cacho Espíndola
- Mariquita Gallegos
- Bettina Hudson
- Marcelo Jaime
- Alberto Locatti
- Gladys Mancini
- Jorge Marchesini
- José Marrone
- Osvaldo Pacheco
- Fidel Pintos
- Raúl Ricutti
- Chela Ruíz
