= Del cuplé al tango =

1958 film

- Directed by: Julio Saraceni
- Written by: Abel Santacruz
- Produced by: José Roberto Patrón
- Cinematography: Roque Funes
- Edited by: José Serra
- Music by: Tito Ribero
- Distributed by: ADOCA
- Release date: 15 October 1958
- Running time: 106 minutes
- Country: Argentina
- Language: Spanish

Del cuplé al tango is a 1958 Argentine film directed by Julio Saraceni and starring Virginia Luque and Tito Lusiardo.

== Cast ==
- Virginia Luque
- Tito Lusiardo
- Osvaldo Miranda
- Fernando Siro
- José Comellas
- Rodolfo Salerno
- Juan Carlos Galván
- Orlando Marconi
- René Jolivet
- Roberto Bordoni
- Gloria Ugarte
- Cristina Berys
