= Oscar Barney Finn =

Argentine film director

- Born: 28 October 1938 (age 87); Buenos Aires, Argentina
- Occupations: Film director Screenwriter
- Years active: 1974-1997

Oscar Barney Finn (born 28 October 1938) is an Argentine film director and screenwriter. He directed seven films between 1974 and 1997. His 1985 film Count to Ten was entered into the 35th Berlin International Film Festival.

== Filmography ==
- La balada del regreso (1974)
- Broken Comedy (1978)
- Más allá de la aventura (1980)
- De la misteriosa Buenos Aires (1981)
- Count to Ten (1985)
- Cuatro caras para Victoria (1992)
- Stolen Moments (1997)
