= Mariquita Gallegos =

Argentine singer and actress

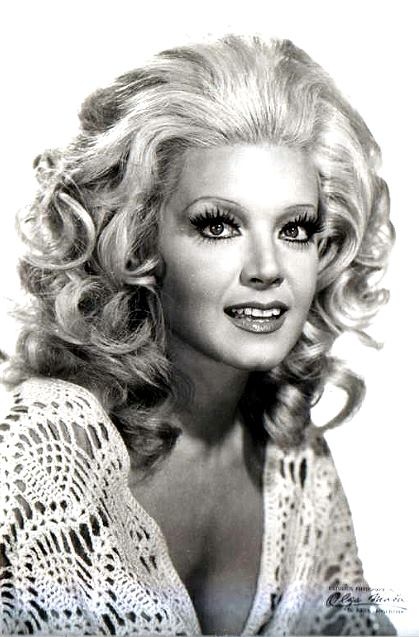
- Gallegos in 1960
- Born: 25 October 1940 (age 85); Buenos Aires, Argentina
- Occupations: Actress, singer
- Years active: 1960–1979 (film)

Mariquita Gallegos (born 1940) is an Argentine singer and actress. She was married to the Uruguayan actor Juan Carlos Mareco.

== Selected filmography ==
- El Asalto (1960)
- La Chacota (1962)
- Would You Marry Me? (1967)
- Los caballeros de la cama redonda (1973)

== Bibliography ==
- Peter Cowie & Derek Elley. World Filmography: 1967. Fairleigh Dickinson University Press, 1977.
