= En la vía =

- Directed by: Alberto Dubois
- Written by: Aníbal Pastor, Manuel Rojas
- Starring: Juan Carlos Altavista, Ernesto Baez, Mario Casado
- Release date: 1959
- Country: Argentina
- Language: Spanish

En la vía is a 1959 Argentine film. En la vía is a black and white film directed by Argentine director Alberto Du Bois, according to the script Anibal Pastor and Manuel Rojas, who was co-produced between Argentina and Paraguay in 1959, but was never commercially released. He had starring Olga Zubarry (1930–2012), Juan Carlos Altavista, Francisco Lopez Silva (Spain), and the Paraguayan actors Ernesto Baez, Carlos Gómez and Emigdia Reisofer.

== Cast ==
- Juan Carlos Altavista
- Ernesto Baez
- Mario Casado
- Carlos Gómez
- Daniel Lago
- Francisco López Silva
- Puchito
- Emigdia Reisofer
- Olga Zubarry
