= Las Locuras del profesor =

- Directed by: Palito Ortega
- Release date: 1979
- Running time: 95 minute
- Country: Argentina
- Language: Spanish

Las Locuras del profesor is a 1979 Argentine comedy film directed by Palito Ortega. It was shot in shot in Eastmancolor and the story of the movie revolves around an eccentric science teacher becoming the favorite of the students at a high school.

== Cast ==
- Carlos Balá - Profesor Socrates Perez
- Javier Portales - Señor De Ulloa
- Raúl Rossi - Director
- Nené Malbrán - Profesora Susana
- Tino Pascali - Profesor Química
- Palito Ortega - Mozo
