= El Rey de los exhortos =

1979 film by Hugo Sofovich

- Directed by: Hugo Sofovich
- Release date: 30 August 1979
- Running time: 90 minute
- Country: Argentina
- Language: Spanish

El Rey de los exhortos is a 1979 Argentine film directed by Hugo Sofovich.

== Cast ==
- Alberto Olmedo ... Dr. Alberto Benavidez
- Susana Giménez ... Susana Lezama
- Fernando Siro ... Ing. Julio Castromil
- Mabel Manzotti ... Felisa
- Rudy Chernicoff ... Detective
- Elena Sedova
- Constanza Maral
- Augusto Larreta ... Juez
- María Rosa Fugazot ... Hilda
- César Bertrand ... Luis
- Carmen Barbieri ... Norma
