= Alberto Anchart =

Argentine actor

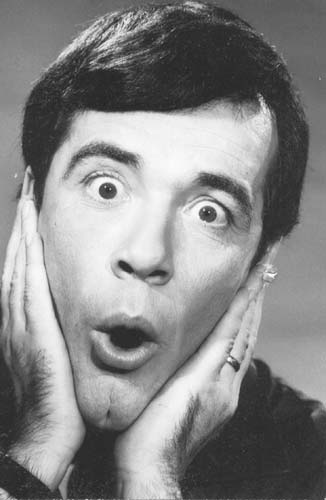
- Born: 24 September 1931; Buenos Aires, Argentina
- Died: 31 October 2011 (aged 80); Buenos Aires, Argentina
- Occupation: Actor
- Years active: 1954–2008

Alberto Anchart (24 September 1931 – 31 October 2011) was an Argentine actor. He appeared in more than 20 films and television shows between 1954 and 2008. He died on 31 October 2011.

== Selected filmography ==
- Venga a bailar el Rock (1957)
- La Casa de Madame Lulù (1968)
- Amigos para La Aventura (1978)
- Cuatro pícaros bomberos (1979)
- The Notice of the Day (2001)
