= Hugo Moser =

Hugo Moser may refer to:

- Hugo Moser (film director), Argentine film producer
- Hugo Moser (scientist), adrenoleukodystrophy researcher

== See also ==
- Moser (surname)
