= A Lover For Two =

Amante para dos
- Directed by: Hugo Sofovich
- Written by: Hugo Sofovich
- Starring: Alberto Olmedo; Tato Bores; Moria Casán
- Release date: 1981
- Running time: 90 minute
- Country: Argentina
- Language: Spanish

Amante para dos (English language:A Lover For Two) is a 1981 Argentine comedy film directed and written by Hugo Sofovich. The film starred Alberto Olmedo, Tato Bores and Moria Casán.

== Plot ==
Mauricio and Alberto are colleagues at an insurance company and share a friendship. Despite their camaraderie, they possess contrasting personalities. Alberto, known for his womanizing ways, frequently engages in flirtatious behavior with every woman he encounters. In contrast, Mauricio is a devoted and serious individual committed to his wife. However, unbeknownst to others, Mauricio maintains a clandestine relationship with Mónica, a showgirl who continually places him in challenging predicaments by pressuring him to leave his wife and be with her.

When Alberto discovers Mauricio's hidden affair, he suggests a peculiar proposition to his friend. Alberto proposes that Mauricio should pass on Mónica to him, effectively becoming Alberto's stable lover. Meanwhile, the wives of Mauricio and Alberto begin to harbor suspicions.

As tensions rise and suspicions deepen, both Mauricio and Alberto arrive at the realization that retaining Mónica in their lives poses a significant danger to their relationships.

== Other cast ==
- Luisa Albinoni
- Cristina Allende
- Alejandra Aquino
- Jorgelina Aranda
- Pepe Armil
- Carlos Del Burgo
- Gloria Gueddes
- Délfor Medina
- Estela Molly
- Jorge Porcel
- Oscar Roy
- León Sarthié
- Gloria Ugarte
