= Adiós, Roberto =

1985 film directed by Enrique Dawi

- Directed by: Enrique Dawi
- Written by: Lito Espinosa
- Produced by: Enrique Dawi
- Starring: Víctor Laplace; Carlos Calvo; Ana María Picchio
- Cinematography: Luis Vecchione
- Edited by: Serafín Molina
- Music by: Pocho Lapouble; Pablo Ziegler
- Production company: Dawi Producciones
- Release date: 4 April 1985
- Running time: 90 minutes
- Country: Argentina
- Language: Spanish

Adiós, Roberto ("Goodbye, Roberto") is a 1985 Argentine drama film, directed by Enrique Dawi and written by Lito Espinosa. The film starred Víctor Laplace and Carlos Calvo.

== Plot ==
Roberto (Carlos Calvo) is an office worker who goes through a separation from his wife, Marta (Ana María Picchio), with whom he shares a son. Needing a new place to live, Roberto seeks the advice of a friend who recommends he talk to his cousin, Marcelo (Víctor Laplace), a writer living alone in a spacious apartment. Unbeknownst to Roberto at the time, Marcelo is homosexual, which strikes him as "strange." Nevertheless, they forge a strong friendship as Roberto moves in with Marcelo.

Their bond remains unshaken even when Marcelo confides in Roberto about his lack of attraction to women. While hints of a possible sexual encounter arise after a night of drinking and attending an artistic gathering, the nature of their relationship remains ambiguous as the story does not explicitly show if they kissed or engaged in any sexual acts. As Roberto's friendship with Marcelo deepens, he must confront his own prejudices and the prevailing heterosexual norms of society.

Roberto's internal struggles manifest in his dreams and simultaneous apparitions, where he faces rejection from his neighborhood friends, pleas from his ex-wife to reconcile, physical assaults from his dead father, condemnation from a Catholic priest who deems it an "offense to God," a psychologist suggesting "therapeutic treatment," disbelief from a prostitute he once frequented as a child, a neighborhood bully accompanied by plainclothes police officers offering to "pull the trigger" and kill Marcelo, and his inconsolable mother's tears. Overwhelmed by these pressures, Roberto reaches a breaking point and decides to leave Marcelo, opting to reside in a budget hotel.

The clash between his desire to be with Marcelo and the societal expectations of heterosexuality triggers a nervous breakdown in Roberto. During this tumultuous period, he wanders onto the street in his underwear, resulting in his arrest and subsequent imprisonment. Given a single phone call, Roberto chooses to reach out to Marcelo, who promptly arrives at the police station with a lawyer to secure his release.

As Roberto steps back into freedom, he finds his wife and son awaiting him, as Marcelo had informed them before going to the police station. Roberto embraces his son, but as Marcelo begins to depart, he questions where he is headed. Marcelo's response is poignant: "Where am I going to go? Home. You know where I live. Goodbye."

== Cast ==
- Carlos Calvo
- Víctor Laplace
- Ana María Picchio
- Héctor Alterio
- Osvaldo Terranova
- María Cristina Laurenz
- Héctor Pellegrini
- María Vaner
- Onofre Lovero
- Ercilia Alonso
- Jacques Arndt
- Pablo Codevila
- Ricardo Jordán
- León Sarthié
- Marcela Sola

== Release ==
The film premiered on 4 April 1985.
