= Manuel Sofovich =

Argentine journalist

Manuel Sofovich (Pergamino, 1900 – Buenos Aires, June 3, 1960) was an Argentine journalist. Sofovich was the son of Russian Jewish immigrants.

He was the father of screenwriters Hugo and Gerardo Sofovich.
