= Josele Román =

Spanish actress and singer (born 1946)

- Born: María José Peralt Román; October 28, 1946 (age 79); Gandía
- Occupations: Actress and singer
- Awards: Festival Internacional de Cine y Arquitectura de Avilés (2024)

Josele Román (born 28 October 1946) is a Spanish actress and singer.

Josele Román was born on 28 October 1946 in Gandía. In 1953 she moved to Madrid to study ballet. In 1963 she joined Conchita Montes company, and her debut was in The Girl from Maxim's. Then she appeared in The Good Person of Szechwan by Núria Espert, and in 1970 she appeared in La marquesa Rosalinda by Valle-Inclán alongside Amparo Soler Leal.

Her film debut was Mi marido y sus complejos (1969), by Luis María Delgado, and then she appeared in Pecados conyugales (1969), Dele color al difunto (1970), La garbanza negra, que en paz descanse (1972), Cuando el cuerno suena (1974), Las obsesiones de Armando (1974), Señoritas de uniforme (1976) and Hierba salvaje (1978).
