= Patricia Dal =

Argentine actress and dancer

Patricia Dal (born in Buenos Aires) is an Argentine actress and dancer. Dal started her career as a scantily clad model and soon she was in “Las Vegas” style shows as a dancer. After achieving fame as a vedette the Argentine cinema industry noticed of her vocation as a comedian actress. She was part of the principal cast of several movies and television humorist shows.

== Patricia Dal cinematography ==
Her films were:
Así no hay cama que aguante	1980	There is not bed that can support it.
Hotel de señoritas	1979	Hotel for Ladies.
Expertos en pinchazos	1979	Expert in pinching.
Encuentros muy cercanos con señoras de cualquier tipo	1978	Closed encounters with Ladies of any type.
Con mi mujer no puedo	1978	I can’t with my wife.
La nueva cigarra	1977	The new cricket.
Los hombres sólo piensan en eso	1976	Men only think of that.
