= Más allá de la aventura =

- Directed by: Oscar Barney Finn
- Written by: Vicente Caputo; Oscar Viale
- Release date: 1980
- Running time: 95 minutes
- Country: Argentina
- Language: Spanish

Más allá de la aventura is a 1980 Argentine film directed by Oscar Barney Finn.

== Summary ==
A journalist arrives in Argentina to investigate the fall of a meteorite.

== Cast ==
- Andy Pruna
- Catherine Alric
- Marcos Zucker
- Mario Casado
- Marcelo Vittola
- Guillermo Tonnellier
- Lilian Riera
- François Dounlonger
- Mariano van Heldren
- Oscar Barney Finn
