= Guillermo Coppola =

Argentine businessman

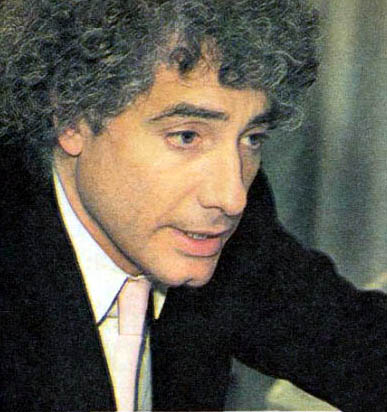
Coppola in 1983

Guillermo Coppola is an Argentine businessman. He was born in Buenos Aires in 1948. He worked as the agent of over two hundred football players, and eventually became the agent of Diego Maradona. His relation with Maradona turned him into a famous television personality. He is the TV host of "Yo, Guillermo" in Canal 5 Noticias. He wrote an autobiography, "Guillote", published by Planeta, that became a best-seller in just 2 weeks.
