= Horacio Pagani (sportswriter) =

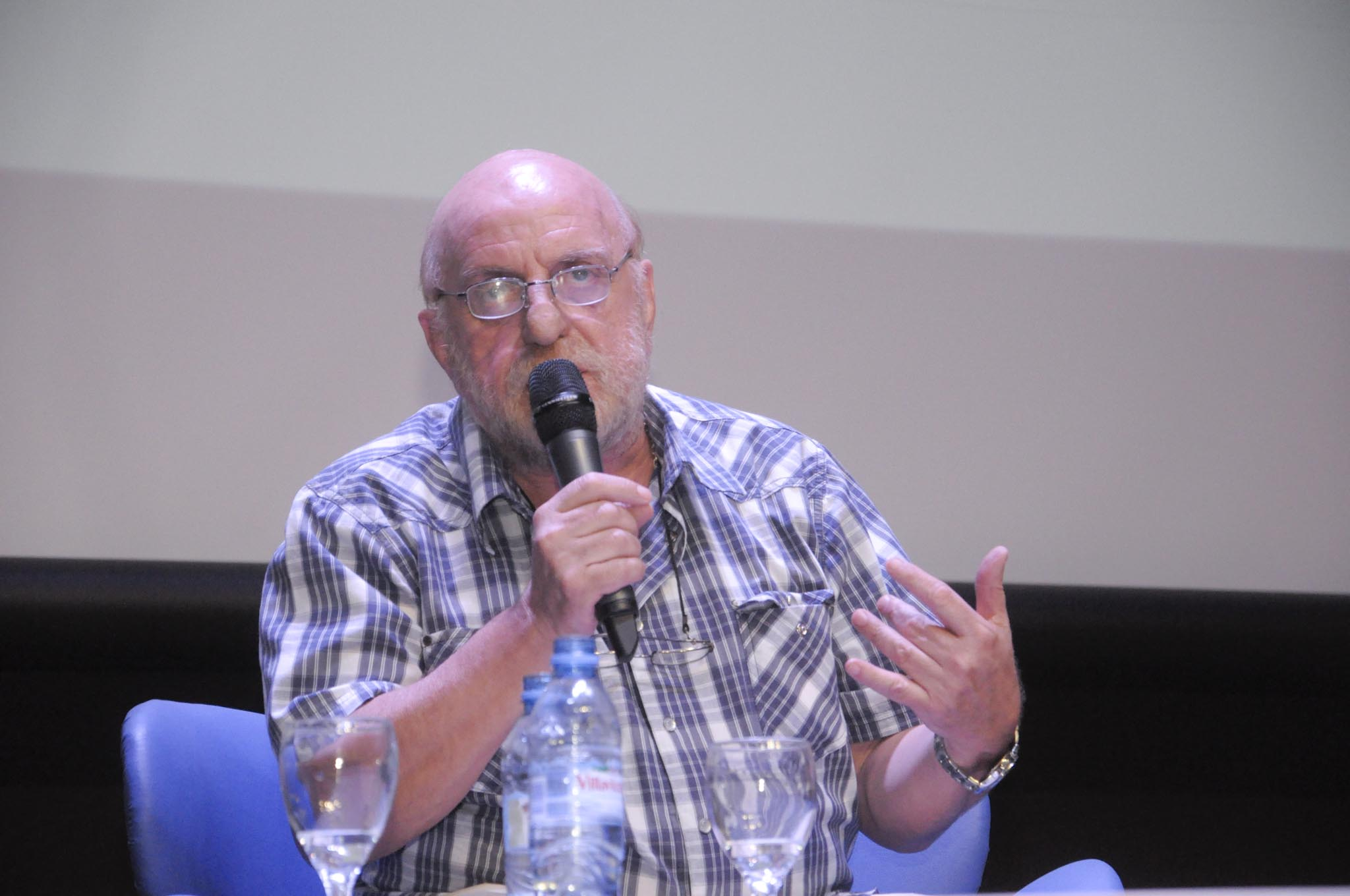

Horacio Pagani (born November 9, 1943) is a prominent Argentine sportswriter and sportscaster.

== Life and work ==
Pagani was born in Buenos Aires, in 1943. He was first hired as a sports journalist by the leading Argentine news daily, Clarín, in 1968, and contributed to the popular local football magazine El Gráfico, between 1969 and 1975. He received a Konex Award, the highest recognition in the Argentine cultural realm, in 1997 for his career as a sports writer, as well as numerous other recognitions from journalist associations and newspapers.

He earned a post as chief sportscaster for Clarín 's radio arm, Radio Mitre, in 1998, and in their cable sports channel, TyC Sports, in 2005. Pagani authored a reflection of his lengthy career, El fútbol que le gusta a la gente (The Football People Like), in 2005, and a follow-up, El Verdadero Fútbol que le gusta a la Gente (The Real Football People Like), in 2008. Pagani has covered seven FIFA World Cups for Clarín, since 1982, as well as numerous boxing events, worldwide. The Argentine Journalists' Association awarded him their prestigious Martín Fierro Award for his efforts, in 2007.

Pagani became the first Spanish-language writer in the world to develop an e-book, PAGANI iLUSTRADO, designed for access via an iPhone or an iPod Touch. True to sportscasting fashion, Pagani is known for numerous on-air catchphrases - the best known of which is probably, Seamos buenos, por lo menos entre nosotros (Let's be good, at least to each other).

He is also known for being a fan of midfielder Juan Román Riquelme; he considers Riquelme to be the best player in the world, and that he is the key player in Boca Juniors. As a result, fans of rival River Plate have accused Pagani of being a Boca fan.

In the summer of 2012, he made his acting debut in the play "Dejame hablar, amor", with the protagonist of Chichilo Viale and written by Daniel Dátola.

He currently appears on "Estudio Futbol", a football-talk program on TyC Sports.

== References and external links ==
- Pagani Digital (in Spanish)
