= Mario Sapag =

Argentinian actor

- Born: Antonio Sapag; 25 May 1930; Buenos Aires, Argentina
- Died: 14 April 2012; Buenos Aires, Argentina
- Occupation(s): Actor, comedian
- Years active: 1957–2012

Mario Sapag (born Antonio Sapag; 1930–2012), was an Argentinian actor, comedian and impersonator. He was perhaps the country's best-known "Turco" (a term meaning "person of Middle Eastern descent" in Argentina) and TV personality during the 1980s.

Some of his most famous roles are featured in the TV series El hombre que volvió de la muerte (1969), El botón (1969) and Somos novios (1969).
