= Délfor =

Argentine actor, comedian, screenwriter, and artist. (1920-2013)

Délfor Dicásolo
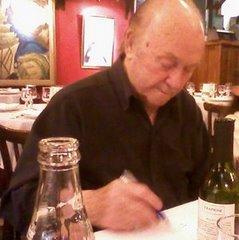
- Born: Délfor Amaranto Dicásolo; April 25, 1920; Chivilcoy, Buenos Aires Province, Argentina
- Died: September 13, 2013 (aged 93); Buenos Aires, Argentina
- Occupations: Actor, comedian, screenwriter, artist

Délfor Amaranto Dicásolo (April 25, 1920 – September 13, 2013), known mononymously as Délfor, was an Argentine actor, comedian, screenwriter, and artist. He was known for his radio work and comedic routines. His career spanned 57 years.

== Early life ==
Dicásolo was born on April 25, 1920, in Chivilcoy, Buenos Aires Province, Argentina. His parents were immigrants from Naples, Italy.

== Personal life and death ==
Dicásolo had two children. He lived in Buenos Aires with his family until his death in 2013. He died on September 13, 2013, in his Buenos Aires home from natural causes, aged 93.

== Other websites ==
- Délfor at IMDb
