= Hugo Moser (film director) =

Hugo Moser (Buenos Aires, April 14, 1926 – Buenos Aires, December 16, 2003) was an Argentine television/film producer and screenwriter. In 1977 he directed Basta de mujeres.

Moser died on December 16, 2003, at the age of 77, after a long disease.

== Filmography ==
=== Director ===
- Basta de mujeres
- Estoy hecho un demonio
- Fotógrafo de señoras
- Ricos y Famosos

=== Screenwriter ===
- Un centavo de mujer
- Chafalonías
- The Falcón Family
- Los hijos de López
- Strange Gods
