= Jorgelina Aranda =

Argentine actress, television personality, and model

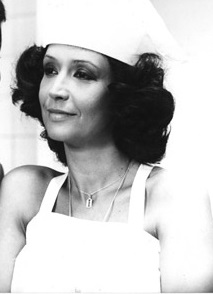
- Born: 19 August 1942; Buenos Aires, Argentina
- Died: 10 January 2015 (aged 72); Buenos Aires, Argentina
- Occupations: Actress, model

Jorgelina Aranda (19 August 1942 – 10 January 2015) was an Argentine actress, television personality and model.

== Life and career ==
Born in Buenos Aires, Aranda began her career as an advertising spokesmodel. She made her film debut in 1965, with the Dino Risi's commedia all'italiana Il Gaucho, and later appeared in numerous films, often comedies alongside Alberto Olmedo and Jorge Porcel. She became popular thanks to her participation to the Channel 11 variety show Si lo sabe cante.

== Personal life ==
Aranda was married to television producer Eduardo Consuegra.

== Death ==
Aranda died, aged 72, after a long illness.

== Filmography ==
- 1964: Il gaucho
- 1969: El botón (TV Series, 16 episodes)
- 1972: El pasito (TV Series 3 episodes)
- 1972: Todos los pecados del mundo
- 1972: ¿De quiénes son las mujeres?
- 1973: Este loco, loco, Buenos Aires
- 1974: Humor a la italiana (TV Series, 1 episode)
- 1975: The Inquisitor
- 1977: Basta de mujeres
- 1977: Hay que parar la delantera
- 1979: Expertos en Pinchazos
- 1980: The Beach of Love
- 1980: Shared Department
- 1981: Multiple Lovers
- 1981: Abierto día y noche
- 1986: Soy paciente
