= Rolo Puente =

Argentine comedian and actor (1939–2011)

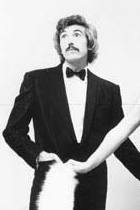
Rolo Puente in 1974

Rolando Pardo Dominguez (13 August 1939 – 5 May 2011), known professionally as Rolo Puente, was an Argentine comedian and actor.

He was born in Buenos Aires. In April 2011, Puente was admitted to Guemes Sanatorium in Buenos Aires for treatment of chronic obstructive pulmonary disease. His condition worsened and he died at midnight on 5 May 2011, at the age of 71.

== Selected filmography ==
- Sólo un ángel (2005)
- Apariencias (2000)
- ¿Sabés nadar? (1997)
- No seas cruel (inédita – 1996)
- Enfermero de día, camarero de noche (1990)
- Me sobra un marido (1987)
- Las Minas de Salomón Rey (1986)
- Camarero nocturno en Mar del Plata (1986)
- Un loco en acción (1983)
- My Family's Beautiful! (1980)
- La noche viene movida (1980)
- Las muñecas que hacen ¡Pum! (1979)
- Un toque diferente (1977)
- La Noche del hurto (1976)
- Contigo y aquí (1974)
- Autocine mon amour (1972)
- Quiero llenarme de ti (1969)
- Los muchachos de antes no usaban gomina (1969)
- Sangre de vírgenes (1968)
- Villa Cariño está que arde (1968)
- Operación San Antonio (1968)
- La bestia desnuda (1967)
- Coche cama, alojamiento (1967)
- Una Máscara para Ana (1966)
