= Hormiga negra =

- Directed by: Ricardo Defilippi
- Written by: Ricardo Güiraldes (novel), Ricardo Defilippi (writer)
- Release date: 3 May 1979
- Running time: 90 minute
- Country: Argentina
- Language: Spanish

Hormiga negra is a 1979 Argentine film directed by Ricardo Defilippi.

== Cast ==
- Miguel Bianco
- Víctor Bó
- Osvaldo María Cabrera
- Mario Casado
- Víctor Catalano
- Rolando Chávez
- Rafael Chumbito
- Luis Dávila
- Roberto Escalada
- Coco Fossati
- Héctor Fuentes
- Beto Gianola
- Oscar Llompart
- Aldo Mayo
- Delia Montero
- Arturo Noal
- Pablo Palitos
- Miguel Paparelli
- Joaquín Piñón
- Jorge Molina Sala
