= Néstor Lescovich =

Argentine film director and screenwriter (1944–2008)

- Born: 14 October 1944; Buenos Aires, Argentina
- Died: 6 November 2008 (aged 64)

Néstor Lescovich (14 October 1944 – 6 November 2008) was an Argentine film director and screenwriter, best known for his 1979 film Mis días con Verónica.

Lescovich was born October 14, 1944, in Buenos Aires. His 1970 short film Luis García won first prize at the Belgrade Film Festival in 1971. Ceremonias (1973) was shot without professional actors. Lescovich also taught at several film schools.

Lescovich died on November 6, 2008, at the age of 64.

== Filmography ==
- Luis García (corto - 1970)
- Ceremonias (1971)
- Mis días con Verónica (1979)
- Sin opción (1994)
- Corazón voyeur (2002)
- Lisboa (2003)
- Yo la recuerdo ahora (2007)
