= Tato Bores =

Argentine comedian

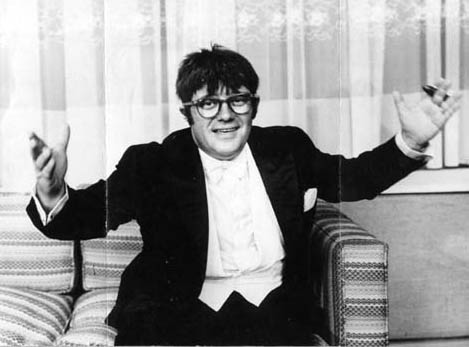
- Born: Mauricio Borensztein; 27 April 1927; Buenos Aires, Argentina
- Died: 11 January 1996 (aged 68)
- Other name: Tato Bores
- Occupation: Comedian
- Years active: 1945–1994
- Spouse: Berta Szpindler
- Children: Alejandro Borensztein; Sebastián Borensztein; Marina Borensztein

Mauricio Borensztein (27 April 1925 – 11 January 1996), known by the stage name Tato Bores, was an Argentine film, theatre and television comedian, who specialized in political humor.

== Biography ==
He was born into a family of Polish Jewish heritage. He took his first steps into the humor field in 1957, after the fall of Juan Perón, debuting in state-owned Channel 7. When in character, he wore a dress coat, a white bow tie, and a deliberately badly cut wig and waved a cigar. Besides the monologues, at some point during each show he pretended to dial the number of the Casa Rosada and speak to the President (whoever it was at the time), asking pointed questions or commenting on uncomfortable news.

Tato Bores in 1960

Near the end of his life, Borensztein abandoned the weekly show format and resorted to "special programmes" every month or sometimes more often. In one of these, he appeared as Dr. Helmut Strasse, "argentinologist", an archeologist specialized in the lost land of Argentina, which had sunk into the Atlantic Ocean 500 years before the fictional time frame of the show. The show was a humorous mockumentary about the downfall of Argentina where Borensztein, speaking in a mixture of Yiddish, German and some odd words in Spanish, overdubbed into straight Spanish by a narrator, commented on the latest findings and theories while he toured a digging site.

Before the broadcast of one of the programmes, federal judge María Servini de Cubría was warned that the show contained an ironic comment about a ridiculously low fine she had received for mishandling a case. Servini ordered the offending segment to be cut out, and forbade Borensztein to mention her name. This violated free speech, since the programme had not been broadcast and she had not verified it was criminally offensive. Borensztein received overwhelming support from the artistic community of Argentina, but respected the judicial order, from then on referring to the judge as "the unnameable" or as Jueza Barubudubudía (intended as a nonsensical yet transparent rhyme of "Servini de Cubría") until the censorship was lifted.

== Professional work ==
=== Television ===
Period	Name of the show	Channel	Scriptwriters
1957–1960	Tato y sus monólogos	Canal 7	Landrú
1961–1963	Tato, siempre en domingo	Canal 9	César Bruto
1964–1970	Tato, siempre en domingo	Canal 11	César Bruto
1971–1972	Por siempre Tato	Canal 11	Jordán de la Cazuela
1973	Dígale sí a Tato	Canal 13	Jordán de la Cazuela
1974	Dele crédito a Tato	Canal 13	Aldo Cammarotta
1978	Special of "El Mundo del Espectáculo"	Canal 13	Aldo Cammarotta
1979	Tato vs. Tato	Canal 13	Aldo Cammarotta, Juan Carlos Mesa
1981	Tato por ciento	Canal 13	Aldo Cammarotta, Juan Carlos Mesa
1983	Extra Tato	Canal 13	Oscar Blotta (h), Carlos Abrevaya, Jorge Guinzburg, Basurto, José María Jaunarena, Geno Díaz
1984	Tato, qué bien se TV	Canal 13	Geno Díaz
1985	Tatus	Canal 13	Geno Díaz
1988	Tato Diet	Teledos	Santiago Varela
1989	Tato al borde de un ataque de nervios	Canal 13	Santiago Varela
1990	Tato en busca de la vereda del sol	Canal 13	Santiago Varela
1991	Tato, la leyenda continúa	Canal 13	Santiago Varela
1992	Tato de América	Canal 13	Santiago Varela
1993	Good show	Telefé	Santiago Varela
1999	La Argentina de Tato	Canal 13	Special cycle post mortem

=== Films ===
- Un pecado por mes (1949)
- La comedia inmortal (1951)
- The Path to Crime (1951)
- Esta es mi vida (1952)
- Mala gente (1952)
- Por cuatro días locos (1953)
- Casada y señorita (1954)
- Vida nocturna (1955)
- Vacaciones en la Argentina (1960)
- El Asalto (1960)
- Propiedad (1962)
- El televisor (1962)
- Viaje de una noche de verano (1965)
- Disputas en la cama (1972)
- Departamento compartido (1980)
- Amante para dos (1981)

== See also ==
- Argentine humour

== Sources ==
- Tato Bores at IMDb
- Tato Bores at Cinenacional.com (in Spanish) (archive)
- Youtube channel
