= Juan Carlos Altavista =

Argentine actor and comedian

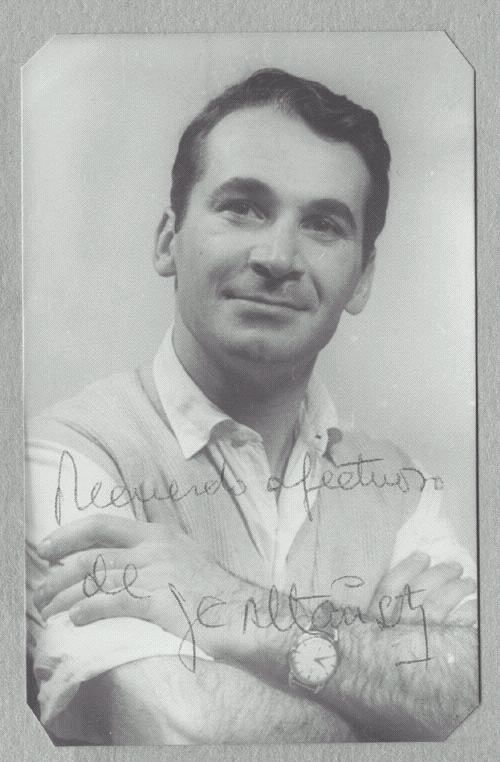
- Born: January 4, 1929; Buenos Aires, Argentina
- Died: July 20, 1989 (aged 60); Buenos Aires

Juan Carlos Altavista (January 4, 1929 – July 20, 1989) was an Argentine actor and comedian.

== Life ==
Juan Carlos Altavista began his career at Teatro Infantil Labarden, in Buenos Aires. Afterwards he learned from Narciso Ibáñez Menta, Francisco Petrone and Luis Sandrini.

The character that carried him to fame, Minguito Tinguitella, a tramp driving an old dustcart, was an idea of Juan Carlos Chiappe. With beret and espadrille, he achieved radio and TV success.

Later, Altavista joined Polémica en el bar, a TV sketch featuring Fidel Pintos, Javier Portales, Vicente La Rusa, Mario Sánchez and Adolfo García Grau.

Minguito was the star in many films from 1942 to 1988. In 1987, Altavista starred in a three-episode TV series, Supermingo, based on a superhero character he had devised for radio sketches.

== Death ==
Altavista died in Buenos Aires on 20 July 1989, due to Wolff–Parkinson–White syndrome.

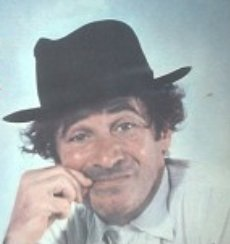
Characterized as Minguito Tinguitella.

== Works ==
Altavista's works include:

=== Films ===
- Melodies of America (1941)
- Juvenilia (1943)
- Cuando en el cielo pasen lista (1945)
- Corazón (1947)
- Los hijos del otro (1947)
- Madame Bovary (1947)
- Vacaciones (1947)
- Los Pérez García (1950)
- Camino al crimen (1951)
- Pocholo, Pichuca y yo (1951)
- La última escuadrilla (1951)
- Paraíso robado (1952)
- La tía de Carlitos (1953)
- Sangre y acero (1956)
- En la vía (inédita - 1959)
- Todo el año es navidad (1960)
- La novia (1961)
- La murga (1963)
- Los evadidos (1964)
- El gordo Villanueva (1964)
- Fiebre de primavera (1965)
- Orden de matar (1965)
- ¿Quiere casarse conmigo? (1967)
- Esto es alegria (1967)
- Flor de piolas (1967)
- Scandal in the Family (1967)
- Lo prohibido está de moda (1968)
- La casa de Madame Lulú (1968)
- El derecho a la felicidad (1968)
- Che, OVNI (1968)
- Villa Cariño está que arde (1968)
- Carne (1968)
- Amor libre (1969)
- El salame (1969)
- Los muchachos de mi barrio (1970)
- El caradura y la millonaria (1971)
- El mundo que inventamos (1973)
- Minguito Tinguitela Papá (1974)
- Las procesadas (1975)
- No hay que aflojarle a la vida (1975)
- Don Carmelo Il Capo (1976)
- Brigada en acción (1977) R
- El divorcio está de moda (de común acuerdo) (1978)
- Amigos para la aventura (1978)
- La nona (1979)
- Vivir con alegría (1979)
- Crucero de placer (1980)
- My Family's Beautiful! (1980)
- Diablito de barrio (1983)
- Mingo y Anibal, dos pelotazos en contra(1984)
- Mingo y Anibal contra los fantasmas (1985)
- Las barras bravas (1985)
- Mingo y Aníbal en la mansión embrujada (1986)
- Las colegialas (1986)
- Tres alegres fugitivos (1988)

=== Radio ===
- 1976/89 El Clan del Aire. Juan Carlos Altavista.

=== TV ===
- Supermingo, TV Channel 11, Buenos Aires.1987 to 1988.
