= Javier Portales =

Argentine actor

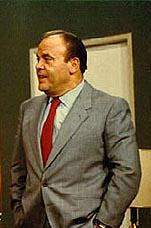
- Born: Miguel Ángel Álvarez; April 21, 1937; Tancacha, Córdoba, Argentina
- Died: October 14, 2003 (aged 66); Buenos Aires, Argentina

Javier Portales, born Miguel Ángel Álvarez (21 April 1937 in Tancacha, Córdoba, Argentina – 14 October 2003 in Buenos Aires), was an Argentine actor who worked in television, film and theater.

== Biography ==
Portales started to work early in life in the theater, then moved to television on a program that dealt with the troubles a group of young people had in high-school in "Quinto Año Nacional" by Abel Santa Cruz. it was in 1964 when his career took an important turn when he was hired for the hit comedy "Operación Ja-Já", where he joined several established comic actors such as Fidel Pintos, Juan Carlos Altavista, Adolfo García Grau and Jorge Porcel. It was in that program that he met his future television friend and colleague Alberto Olmedo.

He did some work in film, starring in 1962 in Una Jaula no tiene secretos.

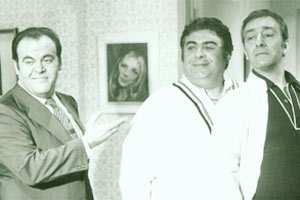
Javier Portales, Jorge Porcel and Alberto Olmedo.

Portales and Olmedo, along with Porcel worked together in a series of successful projects for the movies and for the comedy theater and musicals, also in television, during the 1970s and 1980s.

He achieve his highest success during the 1990s in the TV sitcoms "Son de diez" and "Un hermano es un hermano".

In his last years his health deteriorated and had to be in a wheelchair.

== Theater work ==
Javier Portales wrote a play "La sartén por el mango", directed by Manuel Antín. During the political turmoil of the military dictatorship in Argentina this play was banned by the authorities.

The play became a movie, with Claudio García Satur in the principal role, and with other renowned actors as Alberto Argibay and Víctor Laplace.
