= Enrique Dawi =

Argentine film director and screenplay writer

- Born: 1927; Argentina
- Died: 1988 (aged 60–61)
- Occupation(s): Film Director, and Screenplay Writer.

Enrique Dawi (1927–1988) was an Argentine film director and screenplay writer.

He worked mainly in the Cinema of Argentina and was at his peak in the 1970s and 1980s. He directed Adios Roberto in 1985.
