= Gerardo Sofovich =

Argentine businessman, television presenter, comedian, scriptwriter and director

Gerardo Andrés Sofovich
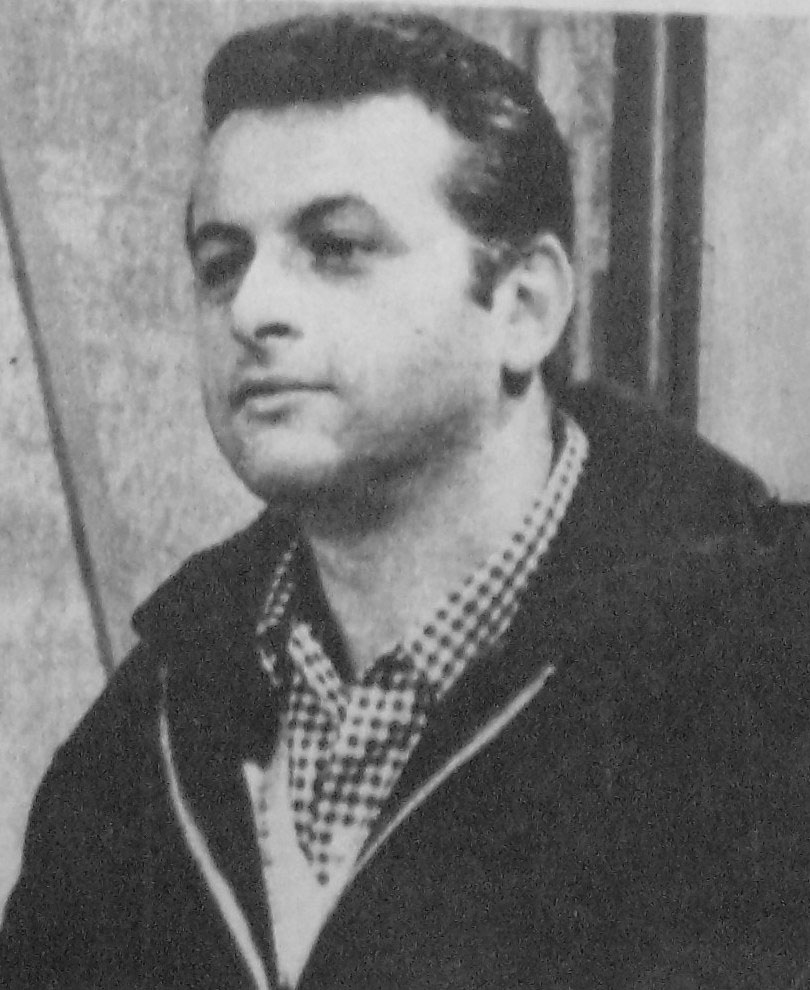
- Sofovich in 1970.
- Born: March 18, 1937; Buenos Aires, Argentina
- Died: March 8, 2015 (aged 77); Buenos Aires, Argentina
- Occupations: Businessman; dramaturge; television host; actor; comedian; scriptwriter; film director
- Partner(s): Carmen Morales (1965-1995); Sofía Oleksak (2009-2011)
- Parent: Manuel Sofovich (father)
- Relatives: Hugo Sofovich (brother) , Gustavo Sofovich (son)

Gerardo Andrés Sofovich (March 18, 1937 – March 8, 2015) was an Argentine businessman, dramaturge, television host and presenter, comedian, scriptwriter, and director.

He was the producer of Polémica en el bar and La noche del Domingo, two of the most popular Argentine TV shows of the 1970s and 1980s. Sofovich also hosted A la manera de Sofovich and Sin Límite SMS, which were broadcast on Canal 9. During the 1970s and 1980s he directed several picaresque films starring comedians Alberto Olmedo and Jorge Porcel. As a businessman, he backed up major shows on Buenos Aires' Corrientes Avenue theaters, and the first businessman to present the first Argentine transvestite in his musical shows,Jorge Perez Evelyn.

== Health problems ==
Sofovich suffered a heart attack in 1992 at age 55. He had 15 stents put in and had twelve 12 angioplasties. On October 8, 2014, it was revealed that Sofovich had been connected to an artificial respirator and was sedated at Clinica Suizo-Argentina hospital after suffering a pulmonary infection, which complicated his health chronic obstructive pulmonary disease condition. He died on March 8, 2015, aged 77, one week and three days before his 78th birthday.
