= Jorge Porcel =

Argentine actor (1936–2006)

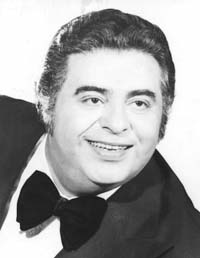
- Porcel circa 1970
- Born: Jorge Raúl Porcel de Peralta; 7 September 1936; Buenos Aires, Argentina
- Died: 16 May 2006 (aged 69); Miami, Florida, United States
- Occupations: Actor, television host

Jorge Raúl Porcel de Peralta (Spanish pronunciation: [ˈxoɾxe raˈul poɾˈsel de peˈɾalta]; 7 September 1936 – 16 May 2006), known as Jorge Porcel, was an Argentine comedy actor and television host. He was nicknamed El Gordo de América (America's Fat Guy). Porcel is considered, along with Alberto Olmedo, one of Argentina's greatest comic actors of the twentieth century.

== Early life ==
Porcel was born on 7 September 1936 at the Rivadavia Hospital in the Recoleta neighborhood of Buenos Aires. He was the son of Concepción Pussillico, a native of Sicily, and Segundo Porcel de Peralta, from the Tulumba Department of Córdoba Province, Argentina.

== Film career ==
Porcel worked in 49 movies, starting with 1962's Disloque en Mar del Plata, and ending with Carlito's Way (1993). Many of these 49 movies were collaborations with Olmedo. Among the movies they did together was 1986's Rambito y Rambón: Primera Misión. (Little Rambo and Big Rambo: First Mission)

Many of Porcel and Olmedo's movies in the 1970s and 1980s were adult-oriented comedies. Conservative Argentine authorities rated these movies as PM-18 (age 18 and above), except for some movies planned for family audiences, which had "tamer" content. These movies are considered to be the pinnacle of Argentina's sexy comedy movie genre. Most of these movies were directed by Gerardo Sofovich or his brother Hugo. Porcel virtually stopped appearing in these movies after the accidental death of Olmedo, which left him clinically depressed.

== Films ==
- El gordo Villanueva (1964)
- Disloque en Mar del Plata (1964)
- Disloque en el presidio (1965)
- Villa Cariño (1967)
- Coche cama, alojamiento (1967)
- Villa Cariño está que arde (1968)
- Desnuda en la arena (1969)
- Flor de piolas (1969)
- El bulín (1969) – Carlos Paiva
- Los debutantes en el amor (1969)
- Pasión dominguera (not released – 1970) (aka 'Los Hinchas' in Argentina)
- Los caballeros de la cama redonda (1973)
- Hoy le toca a mi mujer (1973)
- Los doctores las prefieren desnudas (1973) – Jorge Peralta
- La casa del amor (1973)
- Los vampiros los prefieren gorditos (1974)
- Hay que romper la rutina (1974) – Jorge Portillo
- Mi novia el... (1975) (aka 'Mi novia el travesti in Argentina') – Mozo restaurant (uncredited)
- Maridos en vacaciones (1975) – Jorge Portillo
- El gordo de América (1976)
- Los hombres sólo piensan en eso (1976) – Jorge
- Basta de mujeres (1977) – TV preacher
- Las turistas quieren guerra (1977) – Jorge
- El Gordo catástrofe (1977) – Catrasca
- Desnudas (1977)
- Fotógrafo de señoras (1978) – Jorge Catrasca
- Encuentros muy cercanos con señoras de cualquier tipo (1978) – Jorge
- Custodio de señoras (1979) – Jorge Peralta
- Expertos en pinchazos (1979) – Jorge
- Así no hay cama que aguante (1980) – Jorge
- A los cirujanos se les va la mano (1980) – Jorge
- Departamento compartido (1980)
- Te rompo el rating (1981) – Jorge Fetuccini
- Las mujeres son cosa de guapos (1981) – Jacinto Busarda
- Amante para dos (1981) – Fat man in restaurant
- Un terceto peculiar (1982) – Jorge
- Los fierecillos indomables (1982) – Jorge Pietrabuena
- Los fierecillos se divierten (1983) – Jorge
- Los extraterrestres (1983) – Jorge
- Los reyes del sablazo (1984) – Jorge Pelongo
- Sálvese quien pueda (1984) – Jorge
- Mírame la palomita (1985) – Cayetano
- Los colimbas se divierten (1986) – Jorge
- Rambito y Rambón, primera misión (1986)
- Los colimbas al ataque (1987) – Soldado Jorge Pumba
- Galería del terror (1987)
- Atracción peculiar (1988) – Jorge Trolombatti
- El profesor punk (1988) – Profesor Pancurulo
- Carlito's Way (1993) – Reinaldo "Ron" Saso

== Television career ==
Porcel had many hit TV shows as well, including Operación Ja Ja (both the 1960s original and the 1980s remake) and Polémica en el bar (Debate at the Café). He joined the panel of Polémica en el bar, hosted by Gerardo Sofovich, in 1972, alongside actors such as Javier Portales, Fidel Pintos, Juan Carlos Altavista and Adolfo García Grau. That same year, he partnered for the first time with Alberto Olmedo—a collaboration that would be repeated many times in film—on the television programme Fresco y Batata. The duo established a new model of comedy known as Argentine sex comedy (comedia picaresca), which achieved great success in the 1970s and 1980s. In Polémica en el bar, Porcel had celebrated moments of comedy with fellow comedian Juan Carlos Altavista. Most of these TV efforts were linked to the Sofovich brothers. He also did Las Gatitas Y Ratones de Porcel (Little Cats & Mice of Porcel).

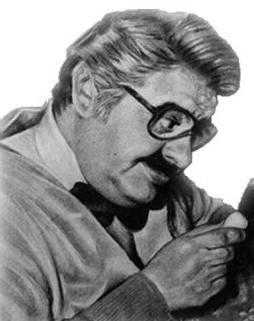
Porcel portraying Don Mateo.

After years of success, he starred—supported by an ensemble cast but with himself as the central figure—in programmes such as Operación Porcel, ¿Lo viste a Porcel? (broadcast on Canal 11, where he performed the bolero Sabor a mí alongside tango singer “Polaco” Goyeneche) and El circo más gordo del mundo. Toward the end of the decade, on Canal 9, he hosted the programme Las gatitas y ratones de Porcel, in which he stood out for characters such as “El Rofo”—a satire of the newspaper vendor “El Rafa”—the Butcher, and “La Tota”—a caricature of a Buenos Aires porteña—alongside Argentine comedian Jorge Luz, who portrayed the character "La Porota". In 1990, on the same channel, he attempted to replicate the success of Las gatitas y ratones with a short-lived programme, Las bebitas y bebotes de Porcel, in which he adopted a more innocent and naïve style of humour that was not well received by audiences.

After he retired from filming movies in Argentina, he moved to Miami, where he starred in a risqué late-night variety show named A la cama con Porcel (To Bed with Porcel) on the Telemundo network. Although it lasted only one season, it remains well remembered by Hispanic audiences in that country. He was also given a cameo appearance in Hollywood production Carlito's Way. A La Pasta con Porcel is a restaurant in Miami Beach opened by Porcel and named after his popular television show.

== Later years and death ==
Porcel's health deteriorated with time, due to his struggles with obesity and diabetes, to the point of ending up using a wheelchair in his later years. He toured during 1999 through Latin America to promote his autobiography Laughs, Applause and Tears. By this time, he had also become a born again Christian.

In a 2006 press release, the family’s official spokesman, Alberto Ávila, stated: "Porcel had already sold a restaurant he owned in Miami, and was only finishing a series of books on Evangelical Christianity, the faith he professed".

Porcel died on 16 May 2006, aged 69, in a hospital in Miami from complications following gallbladder surgery. He suffered a cardiorespiratory arrest at the Mercy Hospital in Miami. According to his spokesman, Alberto Ávila, Porcel died at 19:20: "Jorge had recovered from several previous operations, but his excess weight—which had always been a complex issue—and Parkinson’s disease had placed him in a difficult condition during the final years of his life (...), ultimately leading to the cardiorespiratory arrest that caused his death", Ávila explained.

His remains were laid out in the United States and later flown to Argentina and buried at La Chacarita Cemetery. Owing to his Evangelical faith, the family avoided a lying in state at the cemetery and instead held a small farewell ceremony at the Actors’ Pantheon, officiated by a pastor associated with his faith.

== Music ==
In 1980 he recorded a bolero record called Pure heart (Spanish: Puro Corazón (1980)) . Jorge Porcel loved music and in his shows he used to sing boleros, as in Las gatitas y ratones de Porcel (Porcel's kittens and mice) (where he was frequently accompanied by piano player Mike Rivas) and at ¿Lo viste a Porcel? (Have you seen Porcel). With his character Don Mateo he took part in a record from the show Operacióm Ja-Já (Operation Ha ha) singing along with Rolo Puente, Leo Dan's hit «Libre, solterito y sin nadie» (Free, single and with nobody).

== Comics ==
In 1970's decade, for several years, Cielosur Editora published several magazines dedicated to TV characters, as Piluso, Minguito and El Gordo Porcel. Las aventuras del Gordo Porcel (The adventures of Porcel the Fat Man) was the title of the one dedicated to Jorge. The usual play -with drawings by Francisco Mazza- consisted of el Gordo getting in trouble and several confusions, during the time in between the feasts of food prepared by his mother, who he lived with. Other frequent characters are his girlfriend and his dog Banana, who had his own comic.

== See also ==
- Argentine humour
- List of television presenters/Argentina
- Argentine sex comedy
- List of Argentines
