= Hugo Sofovich =

Argentine film director and screenwriter

- Born: 18 December 1939; Buenos Aires, Argentina
- Died: 12 January 2003 (aged 63); Buenos Aires, Argentina
- Occupations: Film director; screenwriter
- Years active: 1963–1998
- Parent: Manuel Sofovich (father)
- Relatives: Gerardo Sofovich (brother)

Hugo Alberto Sofovich (December 18, 1939 – January 12, 2003) was an Argentine film director and screenwriter.

Although predominantly a screenwriter, Sofovich directed 15 films and script write over 20 films during his career, directed and writing films such as Amante para dos in 1988. In the late 1990s he write several scripts for Argentine television.

He died in 2003 from pancreatic cancer. He was the brother of Gerardo Sofovich.

== Selected filmography ==
- The Inheritance of Uncle Pepe (1998)
- El manosanta está cargado (1987)
- El telo y la tele (1985)
- Un terceto peculiar (1982)
- Amante para dos (1981)
- Las mujeres son cosa de guapos (1981)
- Te rompo el rating (1981)
- Luz - Cama - Accion (1981)
- Departamento compartido (1980)
- A los cirujanos se les va la mano (1980)
- Así no hay cama que aguante (1980)
- El rey de los exhortos (1979)
- Expertos en Pinchazos (1979)
- Custodio de señoras (1979)
- Un toque diferente (1977)
- La Noche del hurto (1976)
