= Alberto Olmedo =

Argentine comedian and actor

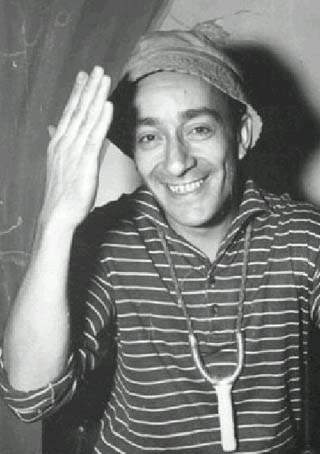
- Born: 24 August 1933; Rosario, Santa Fe, Argentina
- Died: 5 March 1988 (aged 54); Mar del Plata, Argentina

Alberto Olmedo (24 August 1933 – 5 March 1988) was an Argentine comedian and actor.

Olmedo was born in the city of Rosario. In his teens, he was a gifted gymnast and an aspiring actor who tried his luck with several amateur theater companies and enjoyed some local success.

Olmedo moved to Buenos Aires in 1954. One year later, while working as a technician in Canal 7, Argentina's first television station, his improvisation skills caught the attention of the management, whom gave him acting jobs in several TV shows.

While Olmedo had a string of successful children's programs during the 1960s, he gained the most notoriety when allowed to mix slapstick, nonsense and adult-oriented entertainment.

== Career ==
=== Film ===
Starting with Gringalet in 1959, Olmedo starred in 49 movies, including: Los Doctores las Prefieren Desnudas (Doctors Prefer Them Naked), in 1973, Maridos en Vacaciones, (Husbands on Vacation, 1975), Fotógrafo de Señoras (Ladies' Photographer, 1978), Las Mujeres Son Cosas de Guapos (Women Are for the Brave, 1981), Los Fierecillos Indomables (The Indomitable Little Beasts, 1982), Sálvese Quien Pueda (Every Man for Himself, 1984) and Rambito y Rambón, Primera Misión (Little Rambo and Big Rambo, First Mission, 1986). His last movie was Atracción Peculiar, released shortly after his death. Los Fierecillos Indomables had a sequel in 1983.

Many of Olmedo's movies in the 1980s were adult-oriented comedies featuring Jorge Porcel and vedettes Moria Casán and Susana Giménez. Conservative Argentine authorities rated these movies as PM-18 (age 18 and above), save for a few tamer films aimed at family audiences.

The "Olmedo and Porcel" movies are considered to be the pinnacle of Argentina's sexploitation movie genre. Most of these movies were directed by Gerardo Sofovich or his brother Hugo, who also directed Olmedo's TV shows El Chupete (The Pacifier) and No Toca Botón! (Don't Touch That Button!).

=== Television ===
Olmedo's Capitán Piluso show was a hit with children in the 1960s, but he preferred working for adult audiences. After acting in the successful Operación Ja Ja weekly show, Olmedo landed his first leading role in El Chupete.

In 1976, shortly after the beginning of the military dictatorship known as the National Reorganization Process, Olmedo had his own death announced on the show. Once the truth was revealed, the actor was punished for his prank and banished from the airwaves for two years.

In the 1980s, No Toca Botón! was the highest-rated show in Argentina. In fits of improvisation, Olmedo would stray from script, tear down props, dash past the cameras and verbally abuse his fellow actors. He created popular characters such as General González, Rucucu the Ukrainian magician, the dictator of Costa Pobre (a parody of a banana republic ruler; its name is a pun on Costa Rica, since the country's name means "rich coast" and Costa Pobre means "poor coast"), and above all el Manosanta ("the miracle healer"), a multi-level parody on charlatans of all stripes and Argentines' reckless pursuit of sex and money.

Those years saw the blooming of a partnership with character actor Javier Portales, who provided a counterweight to Olmedo's wild improvising.

Olmedo, who was nicknamed el Negro, would evoke his Rosario background by using Rosario slang and narrating implausible stories about his childhood exploits.

== Death ==
Olmedo died in the resort city of Mar del Plata, Buenos Aires, on 5 March 1988. According to police reports, he slipped off his eleventh-floor apartment's balcony. It is believed that he tried, possibly under the influence of alcohol or cocaine, to perform a high-wire stunt on the balcony and lost his balance. The only witness to his last moments was girlfriend Nancy Herrera, who was pregnant with his posthumous son Alberto Jr.

Olmedo married and divorced twice and had six children (including Alberto Jr.). He is buried in La Chacarita Cemetery in Buenos Aires.

== See also ==
- Jorge Porcel
- Argentine humour
- List of Argentines
