= Don Segundo Sombra (film) =

1969 film

- Film poster
- Directed by: Manuel Antín
- Written by: Manuel Antín; Ricardo Güiraldes; Augusto Roa Bastos
- Produced by: Manuel Antín
- Starring: Héctor Alterio
- Cinematography: Miguel Rodríguez
- Edited by: Antonio Ripoll
- Release date: 14 August 1969
- Running time: 105 minutes
- Country: Argentina
- Language: Spanish

Don Segundo Sombra is a 1969 Argentine drama film directed by Manuel Antín, based on the novel of the same name. Winner of the Silver Condor Award for Best Film, it was entered into the 1970 Cannes Film Festival.

== Plot ==
The story takes place in San Antonio de Areco, in the Argentine pampas. Fabio Cáceres remembers his childhood as an orphan and his youth working in the fields, alongside his godfather, Don Segundo Sombra, a lonely gaucho whom he admires and from whom he will learn to be a gaucho, following him in all his adventures. Don Segundo will be Fabio's role model.

== Cast ==
- Héctor Alterio as Gaucho in Black
- Alejandra Boero as Quack Woman
- Juan Carvalledo as Fabio as Young Man
- Lito Cruz
- Luis Manuel de la Cuesta
- Juan Carlos Galván
- Juan Carlos Gené as Don Sixto
- Adolfo Guiraldes as Don Segundo Sombra
- Jorge Hacker
- Luis Medina Castro
- Soledad Silveyra as Aurora
- Fernando Vegal
