= Don Segundo Sombra =

1926 novel by Ricardo Güiraldes

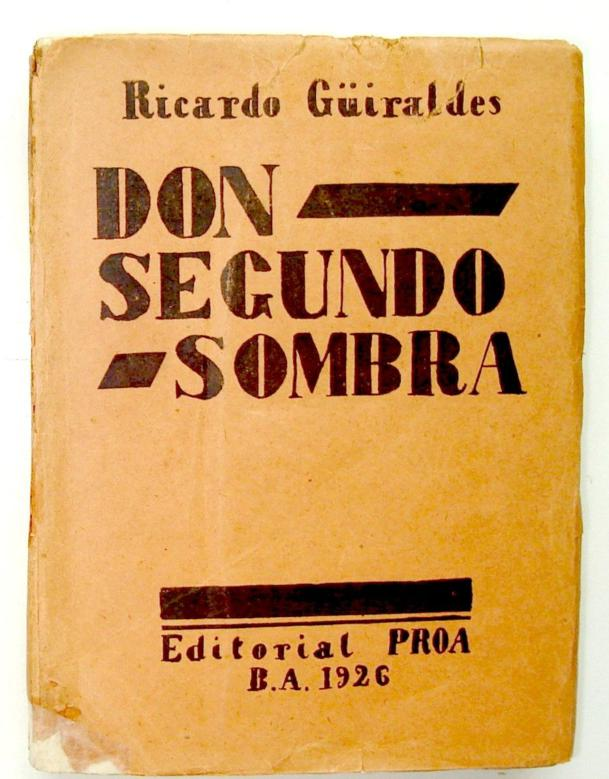
- First edition of the book, 1926.
- Language: Spanish
- Publication place: Argentina

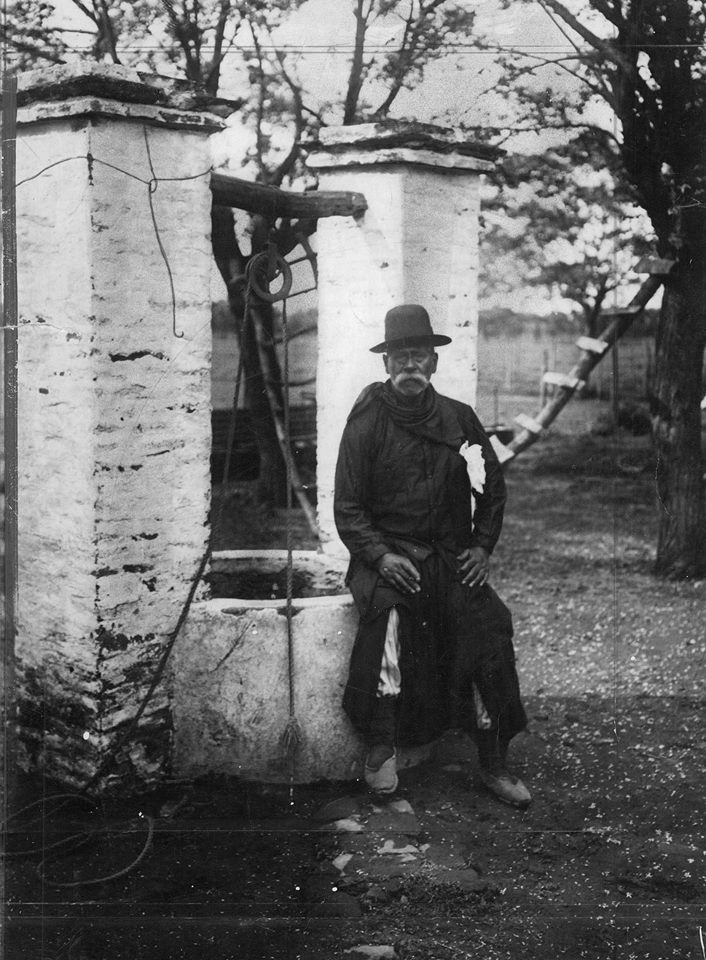
Segundo Ramírez, who inspired Güiraldes to write the novel.

Don Segundo Sombra is a 1926 novel by Argentine rancher Ricardo Güiraldes. Like José Hernández's poem of the 1870s, Martín Fierro, its protagonist is a gaucho. However, unlike Hernandez's poem, Don Segundo Sombra does not romanticize the figure of the gaucho, but simply examines the character as a shadow (sombra) cast across Argentine history.

Unlike the purely fictional character of Martin Fierro, the figure of Don Segundo Sombra was loosely based on and inspired by the real life of Segundo Ramírez, a native of the town of San Antonio de Areco in Buenos Aires Province. The novel was adapted into the 1969 Argentine film of the same name, directed by Manuel Antín.

Ricardo Güiraldes, who was a friend and literary partner of Jorge Luis Borges –they both founded the legendary magazine Proa –, managed to develop a simple and modern language for the novel: a mixture of literary and colourful local expressions that earned him a major standing among the best representatives of "criollismo".

Even though it may be considered as having a continuity of sorts with '"Martin Fierro"', the protagonist is more than an elegy to an extinct gaucho (like José Hernández's character is); instead, Güiraldes designed Don Segundo Sombra to present (or propose) a series of new ethical examples to a youth that Güiraldes considered disoriented and restless during his time.
