= Raimundo Calcagno =

Raimundo Calcagno, popularly known as Calki, (29 October 1906 – 4 September 1982) was an Argentine film critic, journalist, and screenwriter. He started writing reviews in El Mundo in the 1930s. In 1943 he wrote the script for Luis Bayón Herrera's La piel de zapa, and also collaborated in writing the script for Román Viñoly Barreto's Con el sudor de tu frente (1949) and Manuel Antín's Intimidad de los parques (1965).
