= Hipólito Vieytes =

18th-century Argentine merchant and soldier

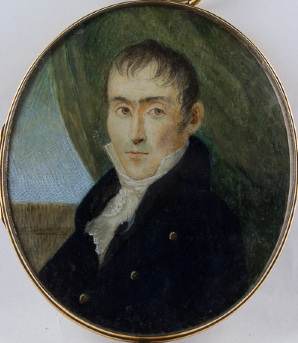

Personal details
- Born: 13 August 1762 San Antonio de Areco, Argentina
- Died: October 5, 1815 (aged 53) San Fernando, Argentina
- Spouse: Josefa Torres
- Education: Real Colegio San Carlos
- Profession: businessman, newspaperman and politician
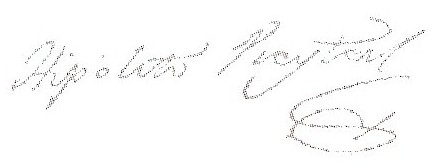
- Signature

Juan Hipólito Vieytes (San Antonio de Areco, Buenos Aires Province, 6 August 1762 – San Fernando, Argentina, 5 October 1815), was an Argentine merchant and soldier. He was the son of Juan Vieytes and Petrona Mora Fernández de Agüero. His family's house was at 133 Calle Real (today's Ruiz de Arellano street) in front of the central square. He advocated for economic liberalism.

== Biography ==
When still a young child, his family moved to Buenos Aires and enrolled him and his brother at the Jesuit school Colegio Real de San Carlos.

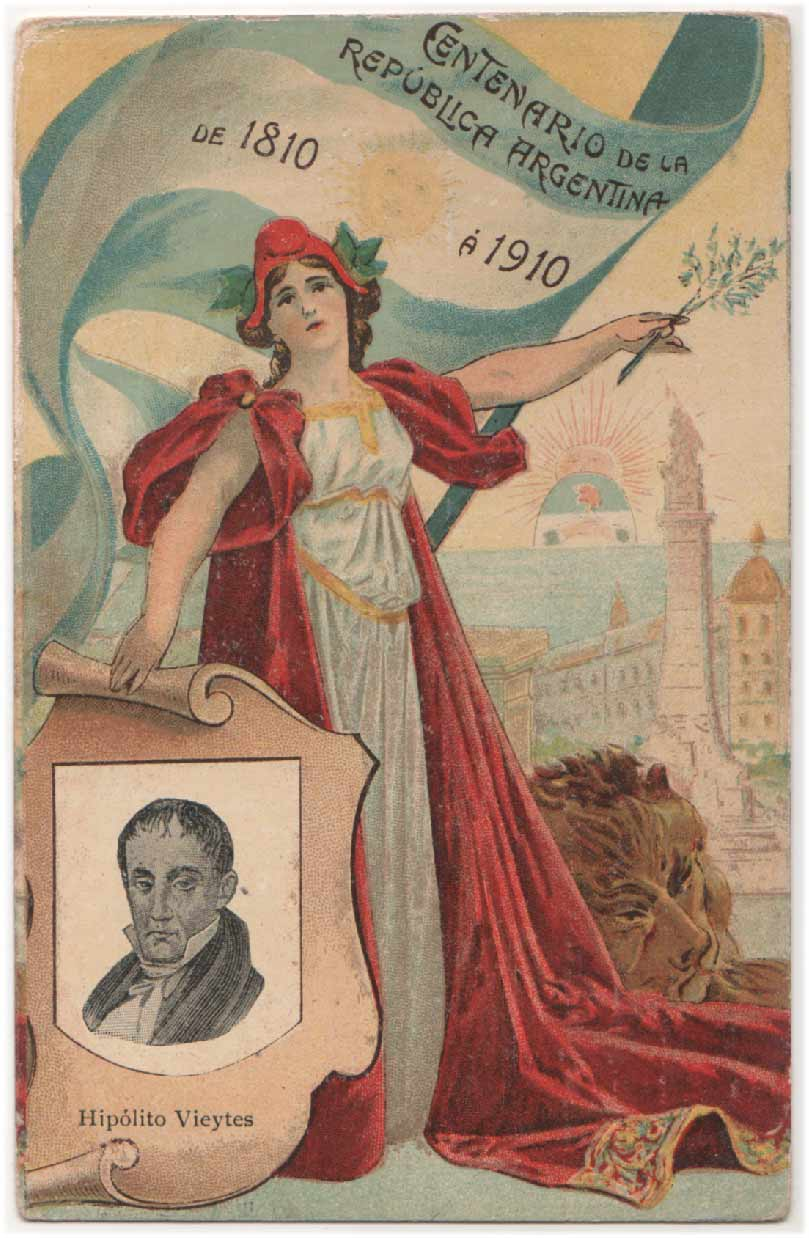
A postcard of Vieytes issued in 1910 to celebrate the centenary

He married Josefa Torres and adopted two children: Carlota Joaquina and José Benjamín (his son studied medicine and became a doctor in 1827).

Vieytes started as a successful businessman, in a soap factory in partnership with Nicolás Rodríguez Peña. There he began to get involved in politics and used the business as a meeting place for the conspirators before the May Revolution (1810), with other prominent citizens, all members of the "Patriotic Society" (Sociedad Patriótica), (Belgrano, Castelli, Moreno, Paso and French).

He was also a newspaperman and founded the second newspaper published in Buenos Aires, the Semanario de agricultura, industria y comercio ("Weekly news on agriculture, industry and commerce").

He played a part in the reconquest of Buenos Aires, during the British invasions of the Río de la Plata, where he attained the rank of captain. In 1810 he supported the May Revolution and assisted the Cabildo. He was named war auditor, but was later removed when he declined to take part in the execution of Santiago de Liniers. After the resignation and death of Mariano Moreno, Vieytes replaced him as secretary to the Junta Grande, until 6 April 1811, when he and other Patriotic Society members were ousted by a coup staged by the conservative wing of the junta, led by Cornelio Saavedra.

== Commemoration ==
Today, there are streets and schools named in his honor in Buenos Aires and in his hometown of San Antonio de Areco.

=== In popular culture ===
Hipólito Vieytes is the subject of the book Vieytes, el Desterrado, wrote by Francisco Suárez in 2001. Despite not being a real autobiography, the book is written in first-person narrative, and shows the investigations made by Suárez.
