= Vieytes, el Desterrado =

Vieytes, el Desterrado (in Spanish "Vieytes, the Banished") is an Argentine historical novel written by Francisco N. Juárez in 2001, narrating the life of Hipólito Vieytes. The book is written from a first-person narrative, in the manner of an autobiography, but it is the work of Juárez, not Vieytes himself.

== Creation ==
Juárez wrote a biography of Vieytes at the age of 17, which was awarded but remained unpublished. Juárez thought that Vieytes was the man that best understood the May Revolution and the country that would be born from it. He kept studying the procer, developing a high admiration for him "Banished and sick after falling with Alvear's government, Vieytes was forever silenced. Shackled, tried and convicted without defense. His books and papers were confiscated and he died shortly afterwards, among fevers and madness of a great depression. If they wanted to silence him, then I thought it was appropriate to try to recover his voice in those hard times that take place, through these pages".

Juárez studied much about Vieytes at the General National Archive, and found his birth-certificate at San Antonio de Areco, birth city of Vieytes. He also found information at the local church. However, much valuable material was lost during a fire of June 16, 1955.

== See also ==
- Hipólito Vieytes
