= The Amazing Race 5 =

Season of television series

- Season 5
- Region 1 DVD cover
- Presented by: Phil Keoghan
- No. of teams: 11
- Winners: Chip & Kim McAllister
- No. of legs: 13
- Distance traveled: 72,000 mi (116,000 km)
- No. of episodes: 12

Release
- Original network: CBS
- Original release: July 6 – September 21, 2004

Additional information
- Filming dates: January 30 – February 27, 2004

Series chronology
- ← Previous; Season 4 Next → Season 6

The Amazing Race 5 is the fifth season of the American reality competition show The Amazing Race. Hosted by Phil Keoghan, it featured eleven teams of two, each with a pre-existing relationship, competing in a race around the world for US$1,000,000. This season visited six continents and twelve countries, traveling approximately 72,000 miles (116,000 km) over thirteen legs. Filming took place from January 30 to February 27, 2004. Starting in Santa Monica, California, racers traveled through Uruguay, Argentina, Russia, Egypt, Kenya, Tanzania, the United Arab Emirates, India, New Zealand, the Philippines, and Canada, before returning to the United States and finishing in Dallas, Texas. New elements introduced this season included the Yield, where one team could force another team to stop racing for a predetermined amount of time, and a new non-elimination leg penalty where teams that finished last were stripped of all of the money they had accumulated during previous legs and did not receive any money at the start of the next leg. The season premiered on CBS on July 6, 2004, and concluded on September 21, 2004.

Married parents Chip and Kim McAllister were the winners of the season, while dating couple Colin Guinn and Christie Woods finished in second place, and models Brandon Davidson and Nicole O'Brian finished in third place.

== Format ==
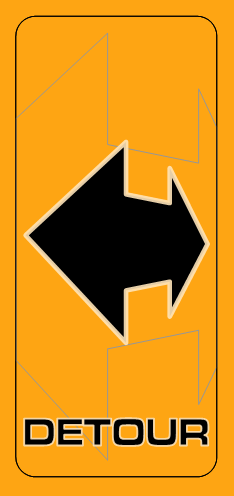
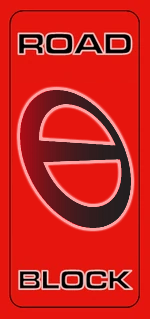
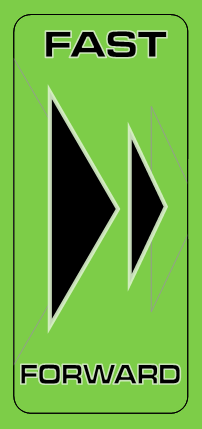
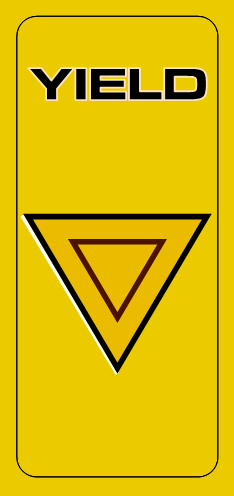
The clues which contestants receive during the course of the race generally fall into five categories: Route Info, Detour, Roadblock, Fast Forward, and Yield.

The Amazing Race is a reality television show created by Bertram van Munster and Elise Doganieri, and hosted by Phil Keoghan. The series follows teams of two competing in a race around the world. Each leg of the race requires teams to deduce clues, navigate foreign environments, interact with locals, perform physical and mental challenges, and travel on a limited budget provided by the show. At each stop during the leg, teams receive clues inside sealed envelopes, which fall into one of these categories:

- Route Info: These are simple instructions that teams must follow before they can receive their next clue.
- Detour: A Detour is a choice between two tasks. Teams may choose either task and switch tasks if they find one option too difficult. There is usually one Detour present on each leg.
- Roadblock: A Roadblock is a task that only one team member can complete. Teams must choose which member will complete the task based on a brief clue they receive before fully learning the details of the task. There is usually one Roadblock present on each leg.
- Fast Forward: A Fast Forward is a task that only one team may complete, which allows that team to skip all remaining tasks on the leg and go directly to the next Pit Stop. Teams may only claim one Fast Forward during the entire race.
- Yield: The Yield allows one team to force another team to stop racing for a predetermined amount of time before they can continue the race. Teams may use the Yield only one time during the entire race.

Most teams who arrive last at the Pit Stop of each leg are progressively eliminated, while the first team to arrive at the finish line in the final episode wins the grand prize of US$1,000,000.

== Production ==
=== Development and filming ===
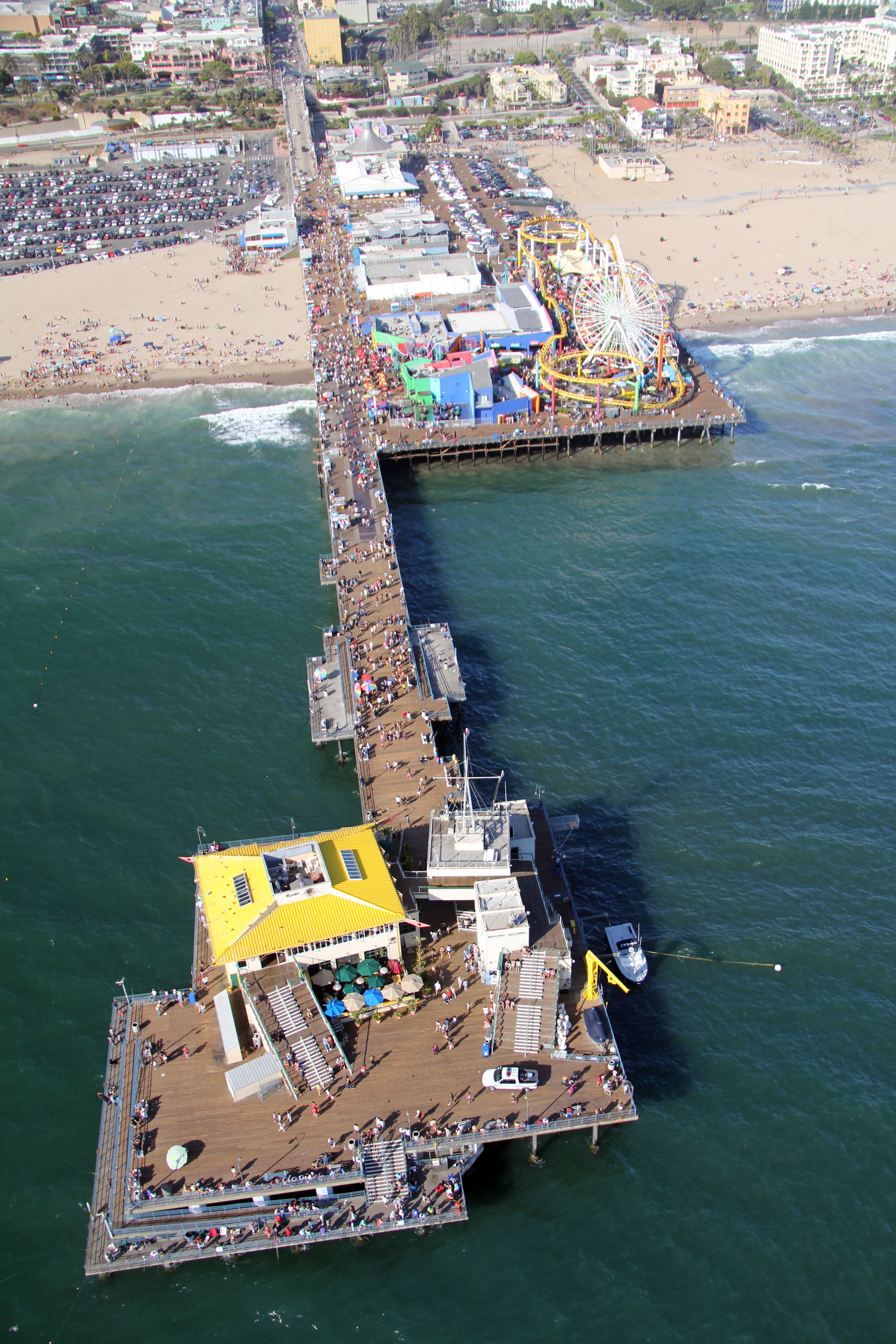
The starting line was at Santa Monica Pier in Santa Monica, California.

After the anemic ratings for The Amazing Race 4, CBS chairman and CEO Les Moonves doubted whether the series would be renewed for another season. After much deliberation, CBS officially ordered a fifth installment of The Amazing Race in September 2003. Some observers cited the series' recent Emmy win as the factor behind its renewal. While CBS flirted with the idea of a fall premiere, it ultimately gave season 5 a summer broadcast to create momentum for The Amazing Race 6 on the fall schedule.

This season introduced two major twists to The Amazing Race: the Yield and the non-elimination penalty. The Yield allowed one team to force another team to stop racing for a predetermined amount of time. The Yield was available on each leg, except the last two, although it was not shown on each episode. The non-elimination penalty required teams finishing last on non-elimination legs to be stripped of any money they had accumulated and, in addition, they received no money at the start of the next leg. This was also the first season to see the number of Fast Forwards reduced; only two were available in the entire season.

Filming for The Amazing Race 5 began on January 30, 2004, and finished on February 27. This season traveled 72,000 miles (116,000 km), which was the show's longest route yet, covering six continents and 12 countries. Nine countries were new to the series: Uruguay, Argentina, Russia, Egypt, Kenya, Tanzania, the United Arab Emirates, the Philippines, and Canada.

The Zorb task in leg 10 was filmed at a New Zealand farm owned by a friend of host Phil Keoghan. Prior to the season, Keoghan had experienced rolling in the Zorb and insisted it be a task on the show.

Marshall & Lance were the first team in the history of The Amazing Race to quit. When they arrived at the Roadblock site in Luxor, Egypt, after all of the other teams had already left, they decided to give up rather than complete the task.

== Contestants ==
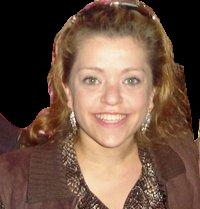
Charla Faddoul

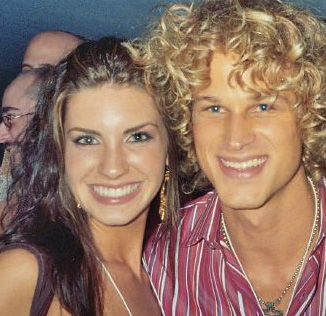
Nicole O'Brian and Brandon Davidson

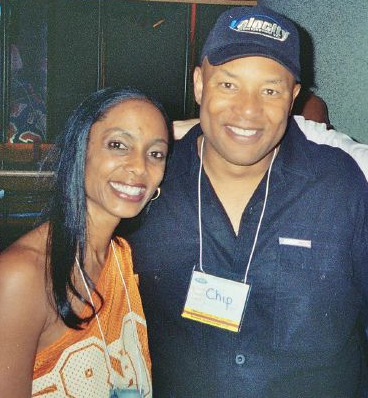
Kim and Chip McAllister

After two seasons that featured 12 teams, the contestant pool this season was reduced to 11 teams. Among the contestants were Charla Faddoul, who was born with achondroplasia (the most common form of dwarfism), and Alison Irwin, who had previously competed on Big Brother 4.

Following this season, Colin & Christie became engaged on CBS's Early Show.

Contestants	Age	Relationship	Hometown	Status
Dennis Frentsos	27	Once Engaged	West Nyack, New York	Eliminated 1st (in Punta Ballena, Uruguay)
Erika Shay	25	Once Engaged	Piermont, New York	Eliminated 1st (in Punta Ballena, Uruguay)
Alison Irwin	23	Dating	Meadville, Pennsylvania	Eliminated 2nd (in San Antonio de Areco, Argentina)
Donny Patrick	21	Dating	Shenandoah, Pennsylvania	Eliminated 2nd (in San Antonio de Areco, Argentina)
Jim McCoy	53	Military Father & Daughter	Jacksonville, Florida	Eliminated 3rd (in Rio Negro, Argentina)
Marsha McCoy	26	Military Father & Daughter	Gainesville, Florida	Eliminated 3rd (in Rio Negro, Argentina)
Bob Barron	61	Internet Dating Couple	Mount Laurel, New Jersey	Eliminated 4th (in Pushkin, Russia)
Joyce Nicolo	54	Internet Dating Couple	Mount Laurel, New Jersey	Eliminated 4th (in Pushkin, Russia)
Marshall Hudes	31	Brothers	Dallas, Texas	Quit (in Luxor, Egypt)
Lance Hudes	26	Brothers	Dallas, Texas	Quit (in Luxor, Egypt)
Charla Faddoul	27	Cousins	Phoenix, Maryland	Eliminated 6th (in Lake Manyara National Park, Tanzania)
Mirna Hindoyan	27	Cousins	Towson, Maryland	Eliminated 6th (in Lake Manyara National Park, Tanzania)
Kami French	26	Twins	Eugene, Oregon	Eliminated 7th (in Paengaroa, New Zealand)
Karli French	26	Twins	Eugene, Oregon	Eliminated 7th (in Paengaroa, New Zealand)
Linda Ruiz	45	Bowling Moms	Palmdale, California	Eliminated 8th (in El Nido, Philippines)
Karen Heins	41	Bowling Moms	Palmdale, California	Eliminated 8th (in El Nido, Philippines)
Brandon Davidson	25	Dating & Models	Los Angeles, California	Third place
Nicole O'Brian	21	Dating & Models	Los Angeles, California	Third place
Colin Guinn	24	Dating	Corpus Christi, Texas	Runners-up
Christie Woods	26	Dating	Corpus Christi, Texas	Runners-up
Chip McAllister	46	Married Parents	Coto de Caza, California	Winners
Kim McAllister	44	Married Parents	Coto de Caza, California	Winners

Future appearances

Charla and Mirna returned to compete in The Amazing Race: All-Stars. Colin and Christie were also invited to participate in The Amazing Race: All-Stars, but had to decline due to Christie's pregnancy. They later competed on The Amazing Race: Reality Showdown in 2019. Charla and Mirna appeared on The Amazing Race: 25 Years Around the World.

Alison Irwin later appeared on Big Brother: All Stars. In 2005, Chip, Kim, Charla, and Mirna all competed on the Bravo reality series Battle of the Network Reality Stars, along with 28 other individuals from various reality series.

== Results ==
The following teams are listed with their placements in each leg. Placements are listed in finishing order.

- A red placement with a dagger (†) indicates that the team was eliminated.
- An underlined blue placement with a double-dagger (‡) indicates that the team was the last to arrive at a Pit Stop in a non-elimination leg. As a penalty, they were stripped of all their money and were not given any at the start of the next leg.
- A green ƒ indicates that the team won the Fast Forward.
- A brown > indicates that the team used the Yield and a brown < indicates the team on the receiving end of the Yield.

Team placement (by leg)
Team	1	2	3	4	5	6	7	8	9	10	11	12	13
Chip & Kim	8th (Note: Chip and Kim, and Kami and Karli, initially arrived 1st and 2nd, respectively, but had missed the clue to the Detour, having simply arrived by chance at one of the Detour options. They had to go back and retrieve the clue before they could check in. Seven teams checked in during this time, respectively dropping them to 8th and 9th.)	8th	7th	1st	4th	2nd	1st	3rd	2nd	4th	1st> (Note: Chip and Kim chose to use the Yield on Colin and Christie.)	2nd	1st
Colin & Christie	7th	6th	1st	2nd	1stƒ	1st	2nd	1st	1st	1st	4th‡<	3rd	2nd
Brandon & Nicole	6th	1st	3rd	5th	3rd	4th	4th	2nd	5th‡	3rd	3rd	1st	3rd
Linda & Karen	3rd	4th	6th	6th	7th‡	6th	3rd	4th	3rd	2nd	2nd	4th†	
Kami & Karli	9th	9th	5th	7th	6th	3rd	5th	5th‡	4th	5th†			
Charla & Mirna	5th	2nd	2nd	4th	2nd	5th	6th†						
Marshall & Lance	2nd	7th	8th	3rd	5th	7th†							
Bob & Joyce	4th	5th	4th	8th†									
Jim & Marsha	10th	3rd	9th†										
Alison & Donny	1st	10th†											
Dennis & Erika	11th†												

== Race summary ==
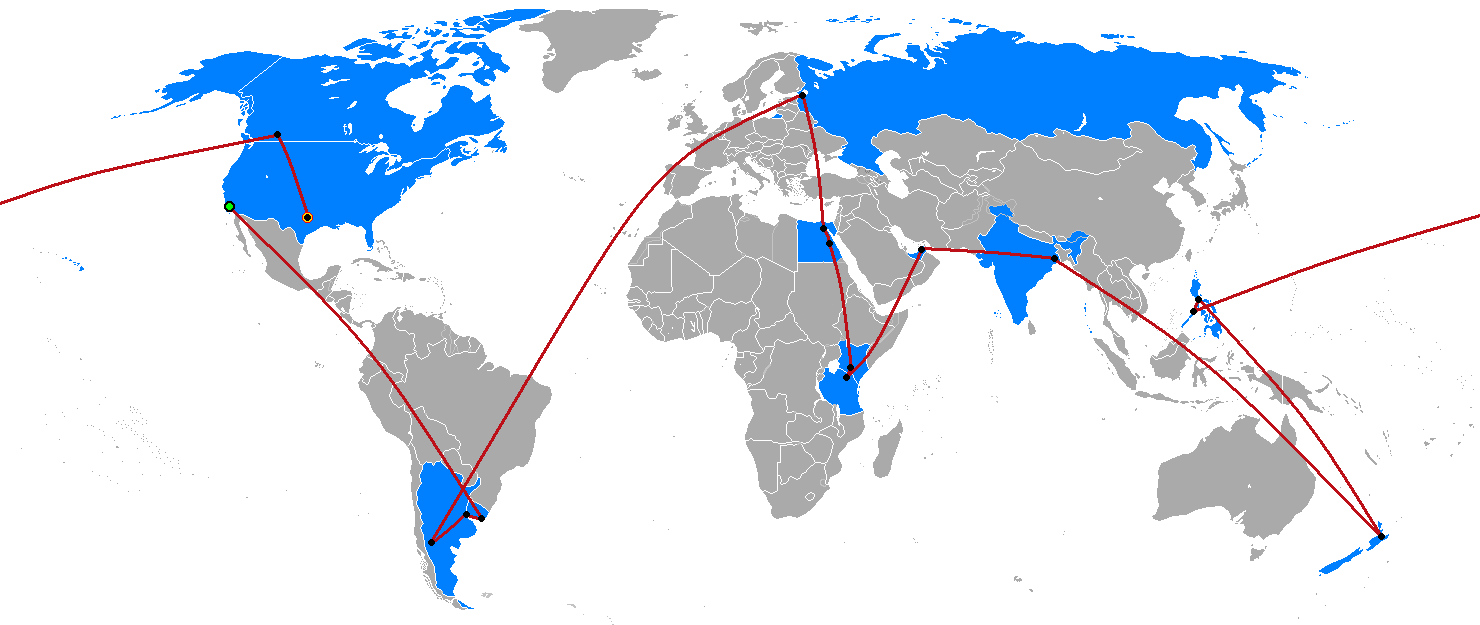
The route of The Amazing Race 5.

Destinations	Air travel Rail travel Water travel Bus travel Helicopter travel Bicycle travel Gondola travel
Route Markers	Detour Roadblock Fast Forward Yield Pit Stop

=== Leg 1 (United States → Uruguay) ===
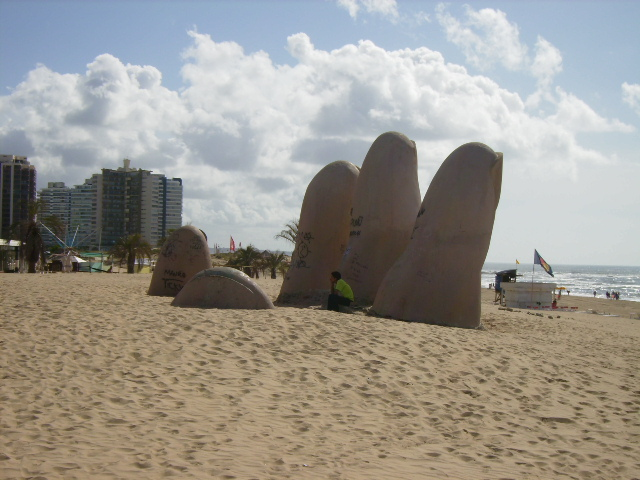
After arriving in Punta del Este, Uruguay, teams visited The Hand to look for their clue.

- Episode 1: "Clearly, I'm More Intelligent than You" (July 6, 2004)
- Prize: A vacation to Hawaii (awarded to Alison and Donny)
- Eliminated: Dennis and Erika

Locations

- Santa Monica, California (Santa Monica Pier) (Starting Line)
- Los Angeles → Montevideo, Uruguay
- Ciudad de la Costa → Punta del Este
- Punta del Este (The Hand)
- Punta del Este → Gorriti Island
- Gorriti Island → Punta del Este (Dock)
- Maldonado (José Francisco González Meat Warehouse)
- Maldonado (La Rosada Carniceria)
- Punta del Este (Conrad Hotel)
- Punta Ballena (Casapueblo)

Episode summary

- Teams set off from the Santa Monica Pier with instructions to fly to Montevideo, Uruguay. Once there, teams had to travel by bus to Punta del Este and find their next clue at The Hand (Spanish: La Mano de Punta del Este). Teams had to travel by boat to Gorriti Island to find their next clue, which instructed them to search for tickets hidden on trees for one of three departure times the next morning.
- After returning to the mainland the next day, teams had to search the dock for their next clue, which instructed them to travel to the José Francisco González warehouse in Maldonado, where they found their next clue. From the meat warehouse, teams had to carry a 55-pound (25 kg) slab of meat to a butcher at La Rosada Carniceria in order to receive their next clue. Teams then had to travel to the Conrad Hotel to find their next clue.
- This season's first Detour was a choice between Zips and Chips. In Zips, teams had to go to the roof of the Conrad Hotel, pull themselves across a zipline above the ground, and then take a second zipline 18 stories down to the hotel pool in order to retrieve their next clue. In Chips, teams had to play roulette in the hotel casino with 20 chips and received their next clue only if they won a game. If teams lost all of their chips, they had to do Zips.
- After the Detour, teams had to check in at the Pit Stop: Casapueblo in Punta Ballena.

=== Leg 2 (Uruguay → Argentina) ===
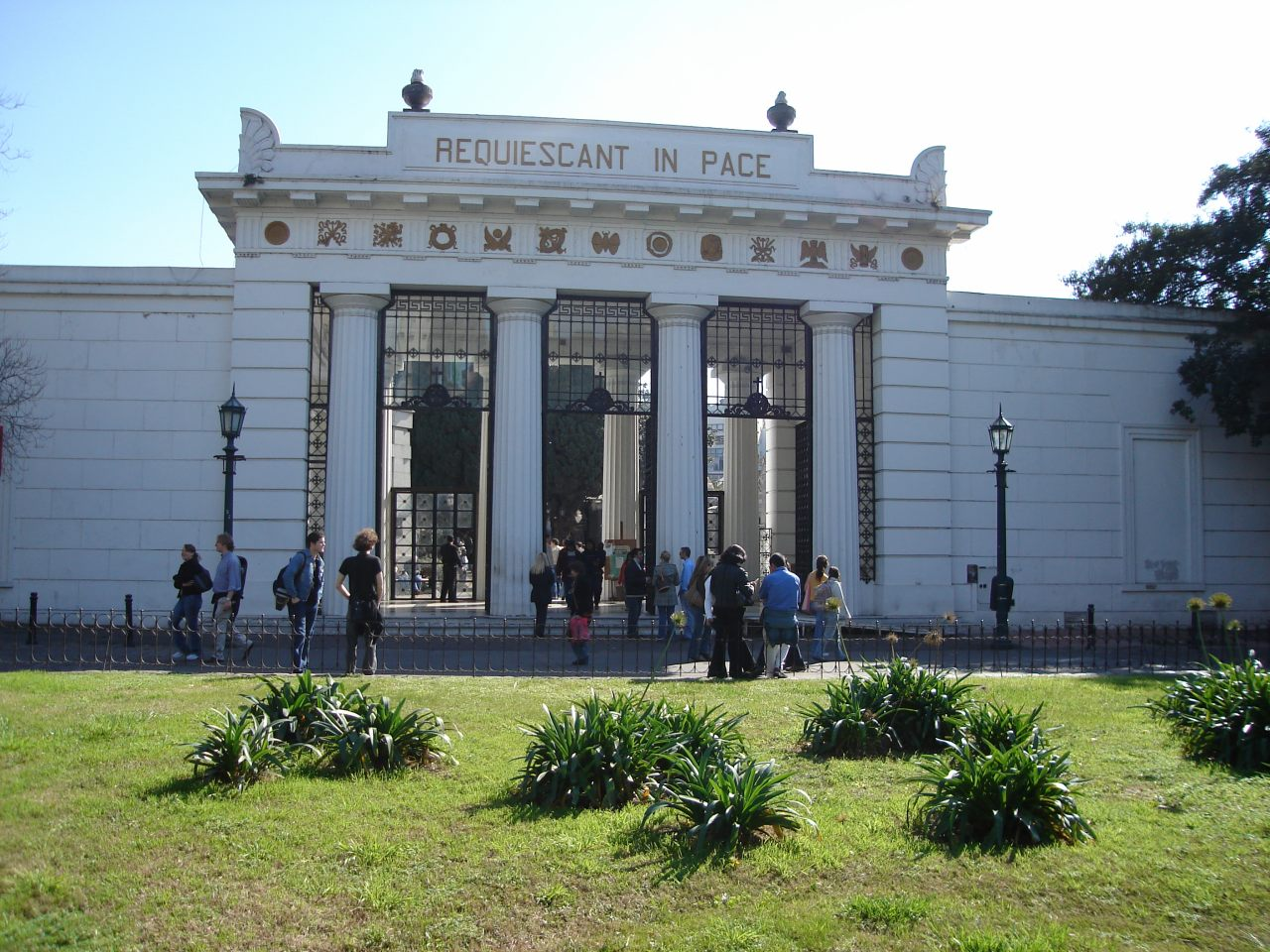
After arriving in Buenos Aires, teams visited the grave of Evita Perón at La Recoleta Cemetery.

- Episode 2: "It Turned Ugly Just Now" (July 13, 2004)
- Eliminated: Alison and Donny

Locations

- Punta Ballena (Casapueblo)
- Montevideo (Shake Mega Disco)
- Colonia del Sacramento → Buenos Aires, Argentina
- Buenos Aires (La Recoleta Cemetery)
- Buenos Aires (La Recoleta Cemetery & Plaza de las Naciones Unidas – Floralis Genérica or Teatro Lola Membrives)
- San Antonio de Areco (La Estancia La Invernada)
- San Antonio de Areco (La Porteña)

Episode summary

- At the start of this leg, teams had to travel to Shake Mega Disco in Montevideo, where they had to find a foam-filled plastic globe on the dance floor that they had to rip open in order to retrieve the clue inside. Teams were then instructed to travel by ferry to Buenos Aires, Argentina. Once there, teams had to find the grave of former Argentine First Lady Evita Perón, which they had to figure out was at La Recoleta Cemetery, to find their next clue.
- This leg's Detour was a choice between Perro and Tango. In Perro, teams had to walk eight dogs on a one-mile (1.6 km) course while using a provided map to navigate past a series of three checkpoints to the Floralis Genérica in order to receive their next clue. In Tango, teams had to travel to the Teatro Lola Membrives. Teams were given a photo of a tango dancer and had find the dancer who matched their photo in order to receive their next clue. If the teams gave the photo to the wrong dancer, they had to get a new picture and try again.
- After the Detour, teams had to travel by taxi or bus to La Estancia La Invernada in San Antonio de Areco to find their next clue.
- In this season's first Roadblock, one team member had to enter a corral and remove a bandana from the neck of one of the calves in order to receive their next clue.
- After the Roadblock, teams had to travel by horse-drawn carriage to the Pit Stop at La Porteña.

=== Leg 3 (Argentina) ===
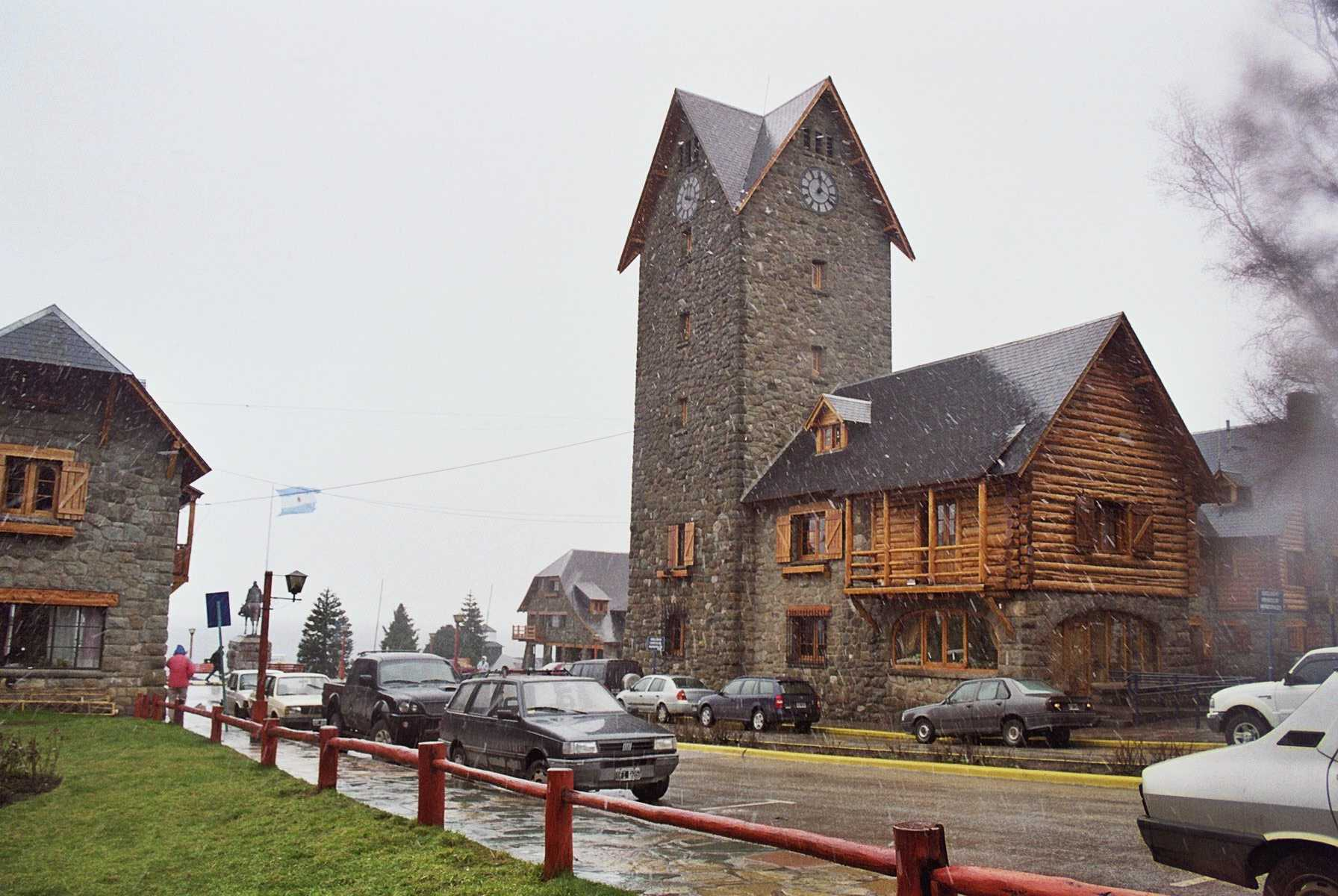
After arriving in San Carlos de Bariloche, teams traveled to the Civic Center, where the mayor handed them their next clue.

- Episode 3: "I Got Electrocuted" (July 20, 2004)
- Eliminated: Jim and Marsha

Locations

- San Antonio de Areco (La Porteña)
- Buenos Aires → San Carlos de Bariloche
- San Carlos de Bariloche (Centro Cívico)
- San Carlos de Bariloche (Del Turista Chocolate Factory)
- Villa Cerro Catedral (Villa Catedral → Cerro Catedral)
- Río Negro (Bahia Lopez)

Episode summary

- At the start of this leg, teams were instructed to fly to San Carlos de Bariloche in Argentina's Patagonia region. Once there, teams had to drive to the Civic Center and find the mayor, who had their next clue. Teams then had to find their next clue at the Del Turista Chocolate Factory.
- In this leg's Roadblock, one team member had to bite through 11,000 chocolates until they found one of 20 with a white center in order to receive their next clue.
- After the Roadblock, teams had to drive to Villa Catedral and then take a gondola up Cerro Catedral in order to find their next clue.
- This leg's Detour was a choice between Smooth Sailing and Rough Riding. In Smooth Sailing, both team members had to paraglide in tandem with an instructor down to the base of the mountain in order to receive their next clue. In Rough Riding, teams would have had to ride a mountain bike down the mountain in order to receive their next clue. All teams chose Smooth Sailing.
- After the Detour, teams had to check in at the Pit Stop: Bahia Lopez in Río Negro.

=== Leg 4 (Argentina → Russia) ===
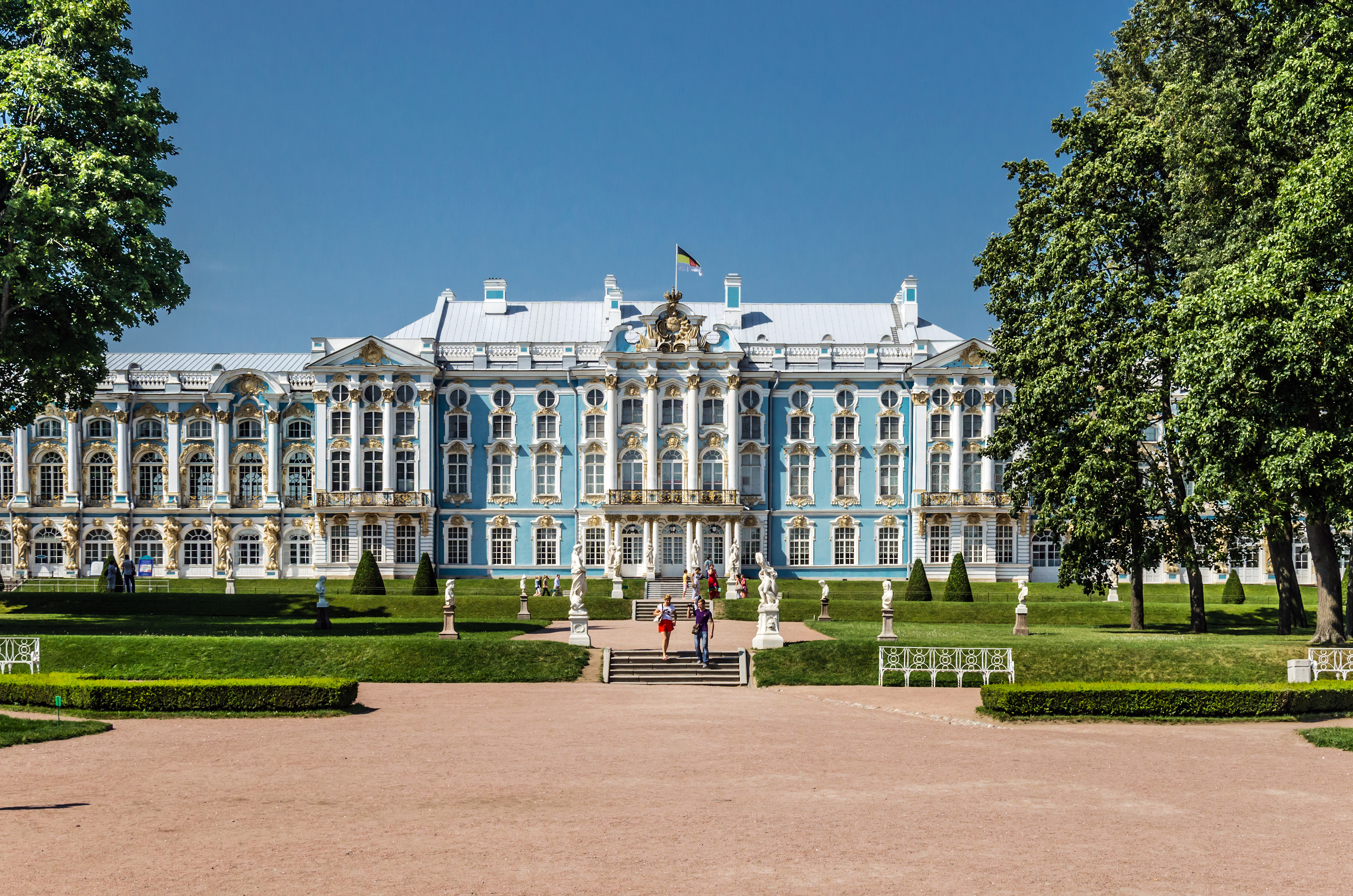
Teams ended this leg in Russia at Catherine's Palace outside Saint Petersburg.

- Episode 4: "Who Says Pageant Girls Don't Eat?" (July 27, 2004)
- Eliminated: Bob and Joyce

Locations

- Río Negro (Bahia Lopez)
- San Carlos de Bariloche → Buenos Aires
- Buenos Aires → Saint Petersburg, Russia
- Saint Petersburg (Battleship Aurora)
- Saint Petersburg (SKA Hockey Rink or Anichkov Palace)
- Saint Petersburg (Senate Square – Bronze Horseman)
- Pushkin (Old Tower Restaurant)
- Pushkin (Catherine's Palace)

Episode summary

- At the start of this leg, teams were instructed to travel by bus back to Buenos Aires, and then to fly to Saint Petersburg, Russia. Once there, teams traveled to the battleship Aurora in order to find their next clue.
- This leg's Detour was a choice between Block 5 Shots and Drink 1 Shot. In Block 5 Shots, teams had to travel to the SKA hockey rink, don ice hockey gear, and block five shots by professional hockey players in front of the goal in order to receive their next clue. In Drink 1 Shot, teams had to travel to Anichkov Palace, where they had to balance a shot glass of vodka on the blade of a saber and drink the vodka without dropping the glass in order to receive their next clue.
- After the Detour, teams had to find their next clue at the Bronze Horseman (Russian: Медный всадник) statue at Senate Square. Teams then had to travel to Old Tower Restaurant in Pushkin, where they found their next clue.
- In this leg's Roadblock, one team member had to eat one kilogram (2.2 lb) of caviar in order to receive their next clue.
- After the Roadblock, teams rode in a horse-drawn carriage to the Pit Stop at Catherine's Palace.

=== Leg 5 (Russia → Egypt) ===
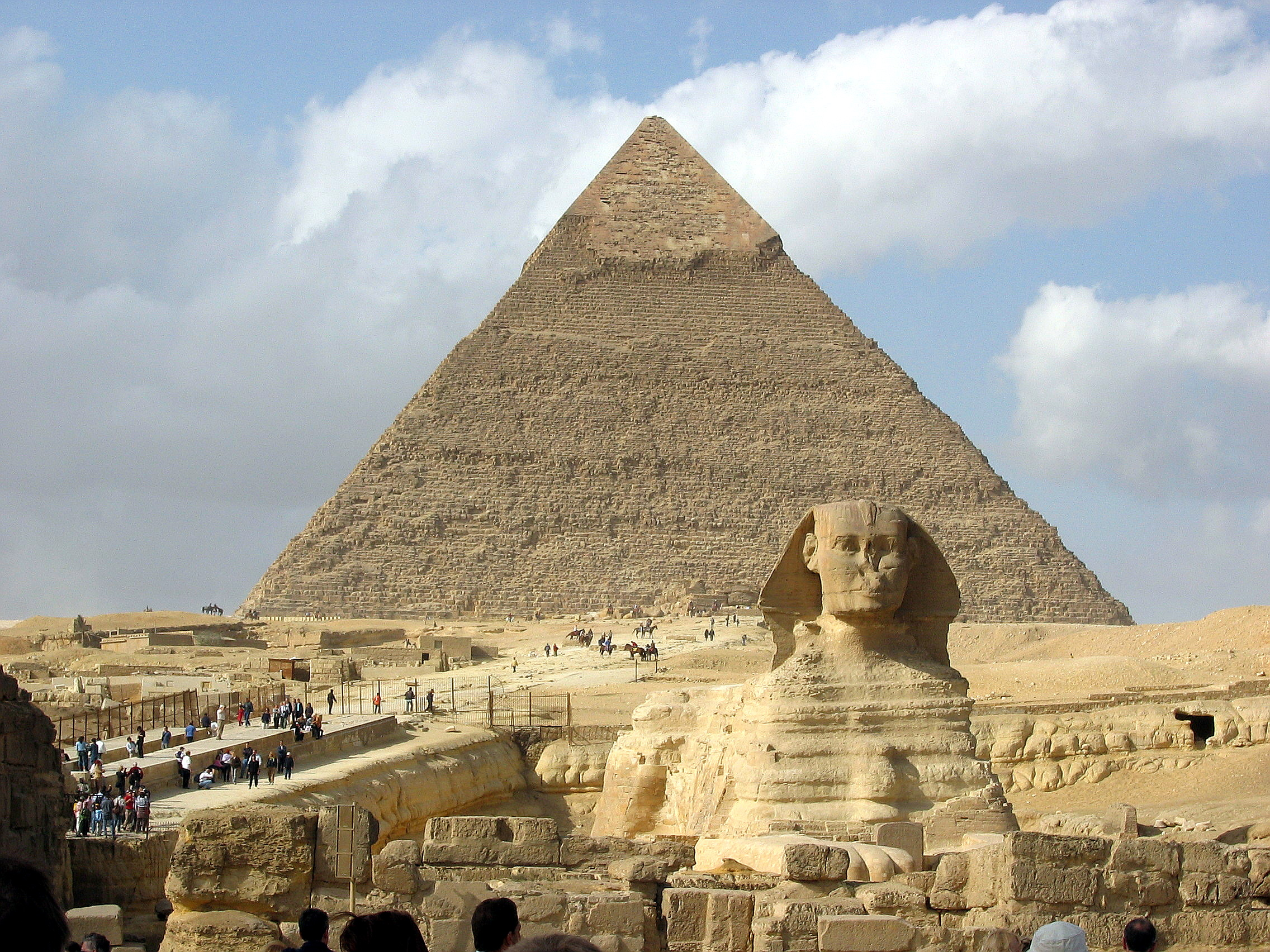
In Cairo, teams visited the famous Giza pyramid complex, including the Sphinx, which was the Pit Stop for this leg.

- Episode 5: "Are You Good at Puzzles?" (August 3, 2004)

Locations

- Pushkin (Catherine's Palace)
- Pushkin → Saint Petersburg
- Saint Petersburg (Hermitage Museum)
- Saint Petersburg → Cairo, Egypt
- Cairo (Tower of Cairo)
- Giza (Pharaonic Village → Qorsaya Island)
- Giza (Giza Pyramid Complex – Osiris Shaft)
- Giza (Pyramid of Khafre)
- Giza (Great Sphinx of Giza)

Episode summary

- At the start of this leg, teams had to return by train to Saint Petersburg and then travel to the Hermitage Museum. There, teams had to find Rembrandt's The Return of the Prodigal Son, where they received their next clue from a curator, which instructed teams to fly to Cairo, Egypt. Once there, teams found their next clue at the Tower of Cairo.
- In this season's first Fast Forward, one team had to go to the Pharaonic Village and find a marked sarcophagus that they had to carry through the village, across the Nile River on a ferry, and to a temple on Qorsaya Island. Colin and Christie won the Fast Forward.
- Teams who did not attempt the Fast Forward had to travel to the Osiris Shaft in order to find their next clue.
- In this leg's Roadblock, one team member had to descend into the depths of the Osiris Shaft. There, they retrieved a satchel of puzzle pieces, which they had to carry back up to the surface and present to an Egyptologist in order to receive their next clue.
- After the Roadblock, teams had to assemble the puzzle pieces on top of the marked area of a map in order to figure out their next destination: the base of the Pyramid of Khafre.
- This leg's Detour was a choice between Rock & Roll and Hump & Ride. In Rock & Roll, teams had to use round logs to move a sled carrying two rocks weighing approximately 600 pounds (270 kg) across an area the length of a football field in order to receive their next clue. In Hump & Ride, teams had to pick a pair of horses to lead camels laden with carpets one mile (1.6 km) to a merchant in order to receive their next clue.
- After the Detour, teams had to check in at the Pit Stop: the Great Sphinx of Giza.

Additional note

- This was a non-elimination leg.

=== Leg 6 (Egypt) ===
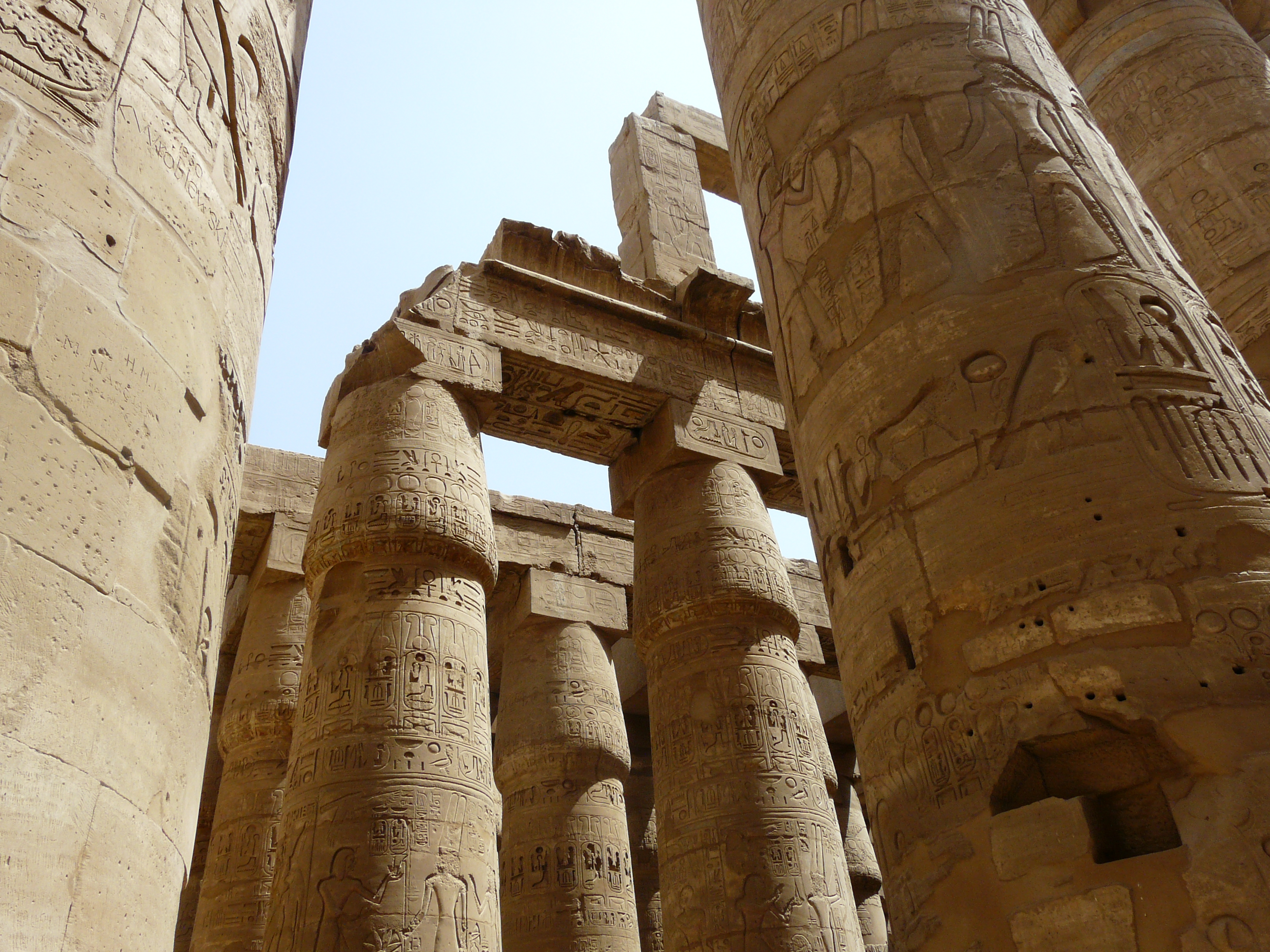
After arriving in the ancient city of Luxor, teams visited the Karnak Temple Complex, where they found their next clue.

- Episode 6: "Why Can't We Get a Camel?" (August 10, 2004)
- Prize: A vacation to Mexico (awarded to Colin and Christie)
- Quit: Marshall and Lance

Locations

- Giza (Great Sphinx of Giza)
- Giza (Great Pyramid)
- Cairo → Luxor
- Luxor (Karnak)
- Luxor (Nile River – Banana Island or Pigeon Farm)
- Luxor (Habu Temple)
- Luxor → Crocodile Island

Episode summary

- At the start of this leg, teams had to descend through a narrow shaft into the Creation Room inside the Great Pyramid in order to find their next clue, which instructed them to fly to Luxor. Once there, teams traveled to the Karnak Temple Complex, where they found their next clue.
- This leg's Detour was a choice between Herd It and Haul It. In both tasks, teams had to travel on a traditional carriage known as a kalesh. In Herd It, teams had to travel to Banana Island and load ten goats onto a sailboat and deliver them to a shepherd on the other side of the Nile River in order to receive their next clue. In Haul It, teams traveled to Pigeon Farm, where they had to use an ancient device to lift water from the Nile to fill an urn. Teams then had to transport the urn by donkey to a farmhouse and fill a cistern in order to receive their next clue.
- After the Detour, teams had to travel to Habu Temple in order to find their next clue.
- In this leg's Roadblock, one team member had to use archeological tools to dig in the sand until they unearthed a scarab to receive their next clue, which directed them to the Pit Stop: Crocodile Island, along the Nile River.

Additional notes

- Teams were instructed to take a charter flight to Luxor, but they could take a commercial flight if they could find one that would arrive in Luxor earlier.
- Phil came out to the Roadblock site after being informed that Marshall and Lance wanted to quit The Amazing Race, noting that it was the first time that any team had quit the race, and the first time that Phil had to come meet a team on the race course and not at the Pit Stop. After Marshall and Lance confirmed that they wanted to quit on account of Marshall's injured knees, Phil informed them that the other teams had already checked into the Pit Stop, and they would have been eliminated anyway.

=== Leg 7 (Egypt → Kenya → Tanzania) ===
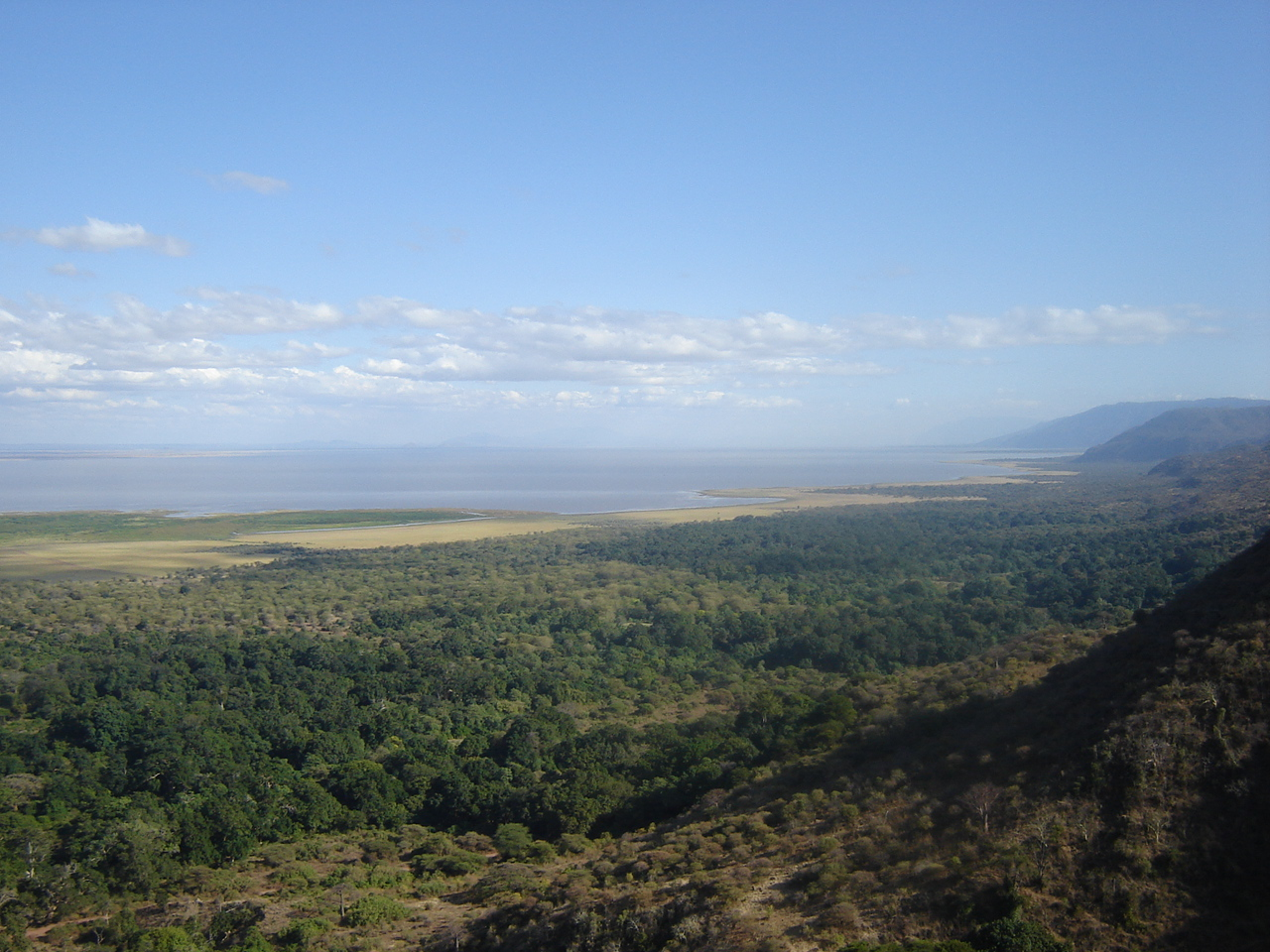
Teams ended this leg at the lookout over Lake Manyara in Tanzania.

- Episode 7: "Are You Sure This is Safe?" (August 17, 2004)
- Prize: A vacation to Latin America (awarded to Chip and Kim)
- Eliminated: Charla and Mirna

Locations

- Luxor (Crocodile Island)
- Luxor → Nairobi, Kenya
- Nairobi (Jomo Kenyatta International Airport – Z. Boskovic Air Charters)
- Nairobi → Kilimanjaro, Tanzania (Kilimanjaro International Airport)
- Kilimanjaro → Mto wa Mbu
- Kibaoni (Kavishe Hotel)
- Lake Manyara National Park (Lake Manyara Lookout)

Episode summary

- At the start of this leg, teams were instructed to return to Cairo and then fly to Nairobi, Kenya. Once there, teams had to search the airport for Z. Boskovic Air Charters and sign up for one of three charter flights to a mystery destination (Kilimanjaro, Tanzania). Once there, teams were instructed to travel by bus to Mto wa Mbu.
- This leg's Detour was a choice between Buzzing and Busy. In Buzzing, teams would have had to travel by bicycle to a local honey farm, where they would have had to put on beekeeper suits and harvest two kilograms (4.4 lb) of honey from African hives in order to receive their next clue. In Busy, teams had to find Katongo Furniture, where they had to load two chairs onto a bicycle-driven cart. When they delivered the chairs to a specific address, they received a receipt, which they had to return to the shopkeeper in order to receive their clue. All teams chose Busy.
- After the Detour, teams had to travel to the Kavishe Hotel to find their next clue.
- In this leg's Roadblock, one team member had to cook and eat one ostrich egg in order to receive their next clue.
- After the Roadblock, teams had to travel to Lake Manyara National Park and ride a zipline across a gorge before they could check in at the nearby Pit Stop.

=== Leg 8 (Tanzania → United Arab Emirates) ===
Teams visited the Burj Al Arab in Dubai.

- Episode 8: "I'm Going to Jail" (August 24, 2004)
- Prize: A vacation to the Caribbean (awarded to Colin and Christie)

Locations

- Lake Manyara National Park (Lake Manyara Lookout)
- Kilimanjaro → Dubai, United Arab Emirates
- Dubai (Burj Al Arab)
- Dubai (Bur Dubai → Dubai Creek – Abdul Rahman's Dhow)
- Margham (Dubai Desert Conservation Reserve – Margham Dunes)
- Margham (Dubai Desert Conservation Reserve – Desert Oasis)

Episode summary

- At the start of this leg, teams were instructed to fly to Dubai in the United Arab Emirates. Once there, teams found their next clue on the helipad of the Burj Al Arab, which directed them to a dhow on Dubai Creek, where the owner gave them their next clue.
- This leg's Detour was a choice between Off Plane and Off Road. In Off Plane, teams had to travel to the Al Quwain Aero Club and tandem skydive with an instructor to a landing site in the Margham Dunes. When teams successfully landed, they received their next clue. Each plane could only carry one team and planes departed 45 minutes apart. In Off Road, teams had to travel directly to the Margham Dunes, where they had to drive a truck over a six-mile (9.7 km) course through the desert ending at the skydiving landing site. If teams got stuck in the sand, they had to radio for help and wait to be extricated.
- After the Detour, teams had to ride a camel and use a GPS navigation device to guide them to the Pit Stop.

Additional note

- This was a non-elimination leg.

=== Leg 9 (United Arab Emirates → India) ===
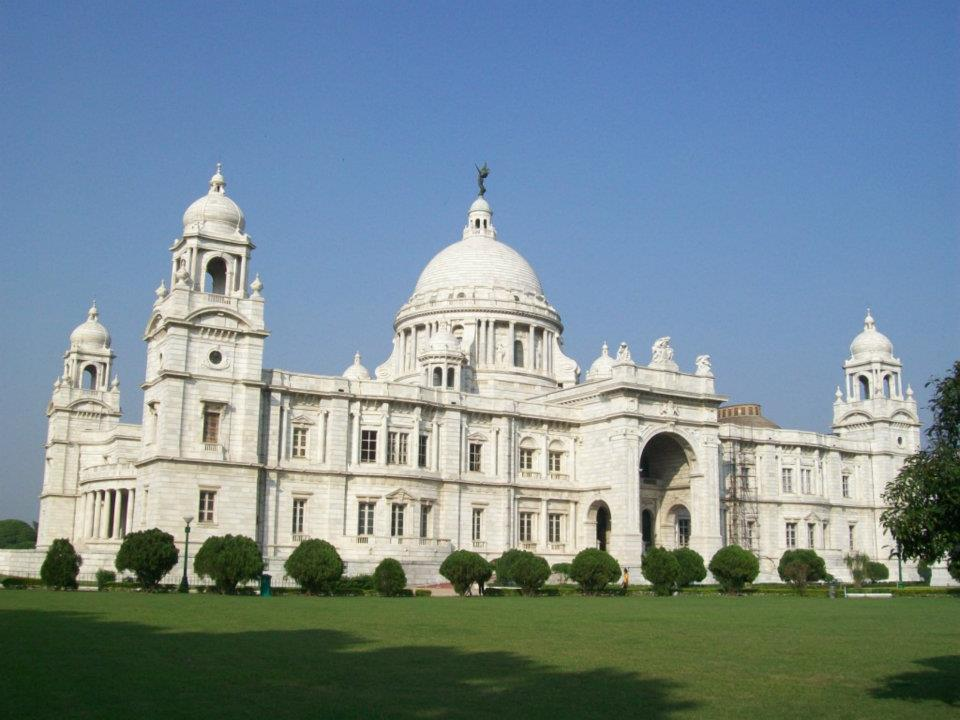
Teams finished the leg in Kolkata at the Victoria Memorial.

- Episode 9: "If You're Going to Whine, Just Shut Up!" (August 31, 2004)
- Prize: A vacation to Mexico (awarded to Colin and Christie)

Locations

- Margham (Dubai Desert Conservation Reserve – Desert Oasis)
- Dubai (Wild Wadi Water Park – Jumeirah Sceirah)
- Dubai → Kolkata, India
- Kolkata (Shaheed Minar)
- Baranagar (Kripamayee Kali Temple)
- Garia (Globe Brick Factory)
- Garia → Kolkata (Sealdah railway station)
- Kolkata (Lansdowne Road)
- Kolkata (Victoria Memorial)

Episode summary

- At the start of this leg, teams drove themselves to Wild Wadi Water Park, where both team members had to ride down the Jumeirah Sceirah in order to receive their next clue. Teams were then instructed to fly to Kolkata, India. Once there, teams found their next clue at the Shaheed Minar, which instructed them to travel to the Globe Brick Factory in order to find their next clue.
- In this season's only other Fast Forward, one team would have had to travel to the Kripamayee Kali Temple, where both team members would have had to have their heads completely shaved in order to win the Fast Forward award. Brandon and Nicole traveled to the temple, but when they discovered what the task entailed, they changed their minds and returned to the Roadblock.
- Teams who did not attempt the Fast Forward had to travel to the Globe Brick Factory in order to find their next clue.
- In this leg's Roadblock, one team member had to use a mold to make 20 mud bricks to the satisfaction of the factory worker in order to receive their next clue.
- After the Roadblock, teams had to travel by train to the Sealdah railway station in Kolkata, where they found their next clue.
- This leg's Detour was a choice between Heavy but Short and Light but Long. In Heavy but Short, teams had to travel to Lansdowne Road and push a taxi 1/2 mile (0.80 km) to a local garage, where they received their next clue. In Light but Long, teams would have had to travel to a flower market, find a particular stall in order to receive a garland, and release it into the Ganges in order to receive their next clue. All teams chose Heavy but Short.
- After the Detour, teams had to check in at the Pit Stop: the Victoria Memorial.

Additional note

- This was a non-elimination leg.

=== Leg 10 (India → New Zealand) ===
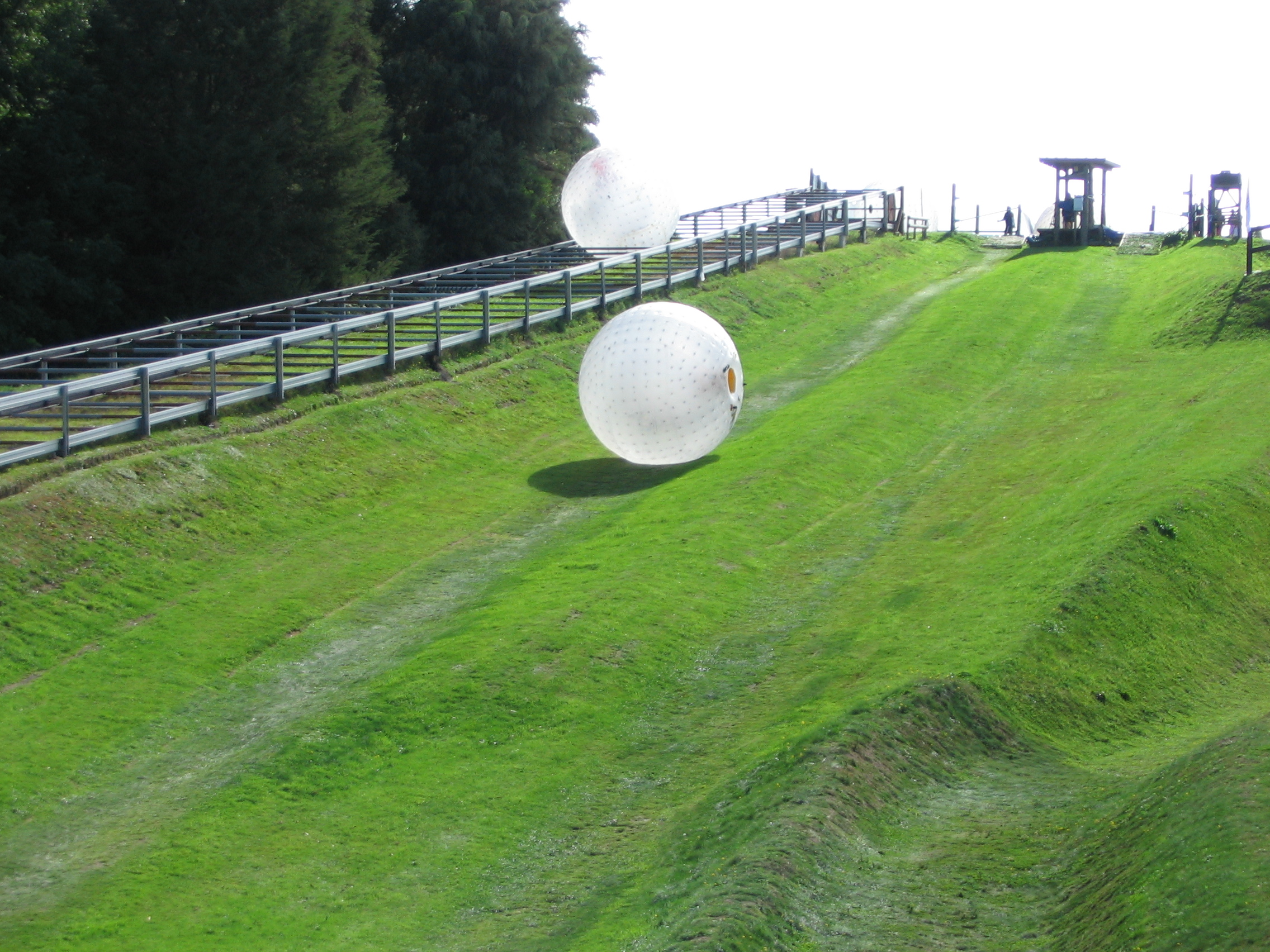
While in New Zealand, one team member went Zorbing down a hill for the Roadblock.

- Episode 10: "If They're Screwing the Helmet to My Head, It Can't Be Good!" (September 7, 2004)
- Prize: A vacation to Europe (awarded to Colin and Christie)
- Eliminated: Kami and Karli

Locations

- Kolkata (Victoria Memorial)
- Kolkata → Auckland, New Zealand
- Rotorua (Rotorua Museum)
- Rotorua (Okere Falls or Hell's Gate)
- Paengaroa (Matapara Farms)

Episode summary

- At the start of this leg, teams were instructed to fly to Auckland, New Zealand. Once there, teams had to drive to Rotorua and find their next clue at the Rotorua Museum.
- This leg's Detour was a choice between Clean and Dirty. In Clean, teams had to drive to Okere Falls and perform an adventure sport called river sledging on the Kaituna River. With the help of two guides, teams had to complete a one-mile (1.6 km) course with only a small board (a sledge) for protection. At the end of the course, the instructor gave them their next clue. In Dirty, teams had to travel to Hell's Gate and search within a bubbling mud pit for their next clue.
- After the Detour, teams had to drive to Matapara Farms in Paengaroa to find their next clue.
- In this leg's Roadblock, one team member had to inflate a Zorb, ride it down a hillside, and then walk it a short distance to cross the finish line at the bottom of the hill. Teams could then run to the Pit Stop.

=== Leg 11 (New Zealand → Philippines) ===
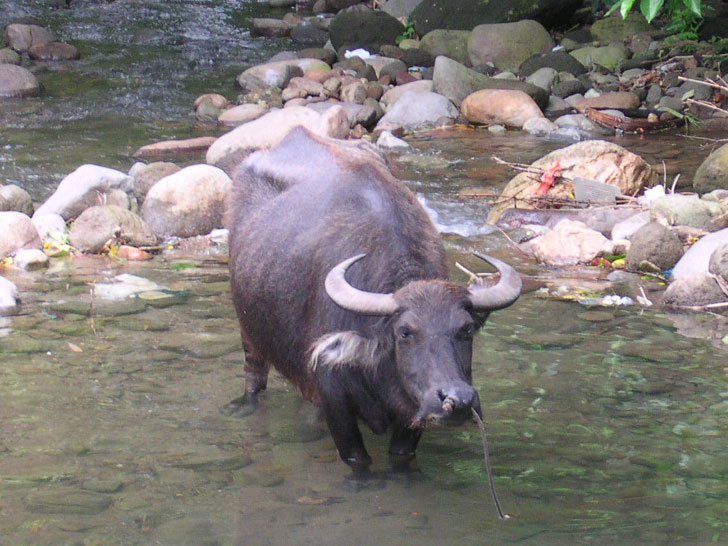
One of the most iconic scenes in the history of The Amazing Race took place in the Philippines, where teams had to work with an ox-drawn plow.

- Episode 11: "It's Okay, Run Them Over!" (September 14, 2004)
- Prize: A vacation to Hawaii (awarded to Chip and Kim)

Locations

- Paengaroa (Matapara Farms)
- Auckland (Westhaven Marina)
- Auckland (Auckland Harbour Bridge)
- Auckland → Manila, Philippines
- Imus (Malagueña Motors)
- Victoria (Field)
- Pasay (Coconut Palace)

Episode summary

- At the start of this leg, teams had to drive to the Westhaven Marina in Auckland, find a yacht called the Hydroflow, and lower their next clue from the yacht's rigging.
- In this leg's Roadblock, one team member had to travel by boat to Auckland Harbour Bridge and climb a ladder to the girders beneath the roadway. From there, they had to walk along the girders to retrieve the clue on the other side, at which point they were then lowered to a waiting boat below.
- Teams were then instructed to fly to Manila, Philippines. Once there, teams had to go to Malagueña Motors. There, teams had to decorate a jeepney with all of the provided items in order to receive their next clue. Teams were then driven to their next destination in the jeepney that they had decorated.
- This leg's Detour was a choice between Plow and Fowl. In Plow, teams had to use an ox-drawn plow to till a muddy field until the plow caught on a buried rope attached to a hidden clue. In Fowl, teams would have had to herd 1,000 ducks from one pen to another in order to receive their next clue. All teams chose Plow.
- After the Detour, teams had to check in at the Pit Stop: the Coconut Palace in Pasay.

Additional notes

- Chip and Kim chose to use the Yield on Colin and Christie.
- At the Detour, Colin had a meltdown trying to direct the ox through the field, leading him to angrily scream, "My ox is broken!" This scene became one of the most memorable and iconic scenes in the history of The Amazing Race.
- The ox-plow task was later revisited in season 25 as a Switchback.
- Luli Arroyo, daughter of the then-Filipino president, Gloria Macapagal Arroyo, appeared as the Pit Stop greeter.
- This was a non-elimination leg.

=== Leg 12 (Philippines) ===
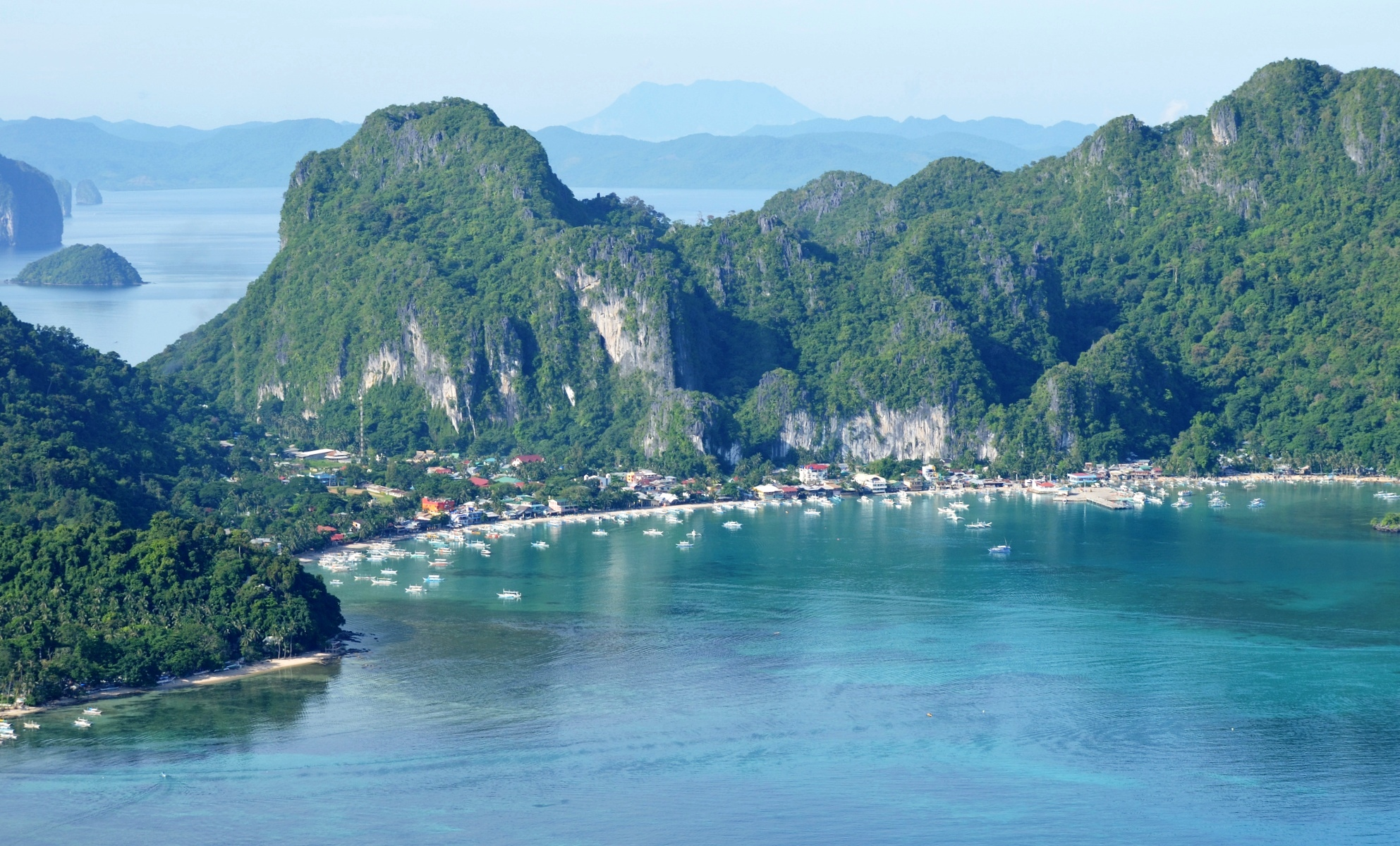
Teams visited the resort town of El Nido on this leg.

- Episode 12: "You've Just Made Me a Millionaire" (September 21, 2004)
- Prize: A vacation to the Caribbean (awarded to Brandon and Nicole)
- Eliminated: Linda and Karen

Locations

- Pasay (Coconut Palace)
- Manila (Luneta Park – José Rizal Monument)
- Pasay (A. Soriano Aviation)
- Manila → El Nido
- El Nido (El Nido Airport → El Nido Pier)
- El Nido (El Nido Pier → Bacuit Bay)
- El Nido (Pangulasian Island)
- El Nido (Lagen Wall)
- El Nido (Lagen Island)

Episode summary

- At the start of this leg, teams had to find their next clue at the José Rizal Monument in Luneta Park, which directed them to A. Soriano Aviation, where teams had to sign up for one of two charter flights to El Nido. Once there, teams took a marked jeepney to El Nido Pier and a marked boat to a buoy, where they found their next clue.
- Teams had to use binoculars to search for the one island of three that was displaying the Philippine flag – (Philippines) – where they would find their next clue. The other two islands displayed flags of other nations and teams could not ask their guide for help. Teams found their next clue on the shore of Pangulasian Island, where they were instructed to put on snorkel gear and search underwater for one of four giant clams, which contained their next clue.
- In this season's final Roadblock, one team member had to climb the 150-foot (46 m) Lagen Wall using an ascender, retrieve their next clue, and then rappel back down.
- After the Roadblock, teams had to paddle a kayak to the Pit Stop on Lagen Island.

=== Leg 13 (Philippines → Canada → United States) ===
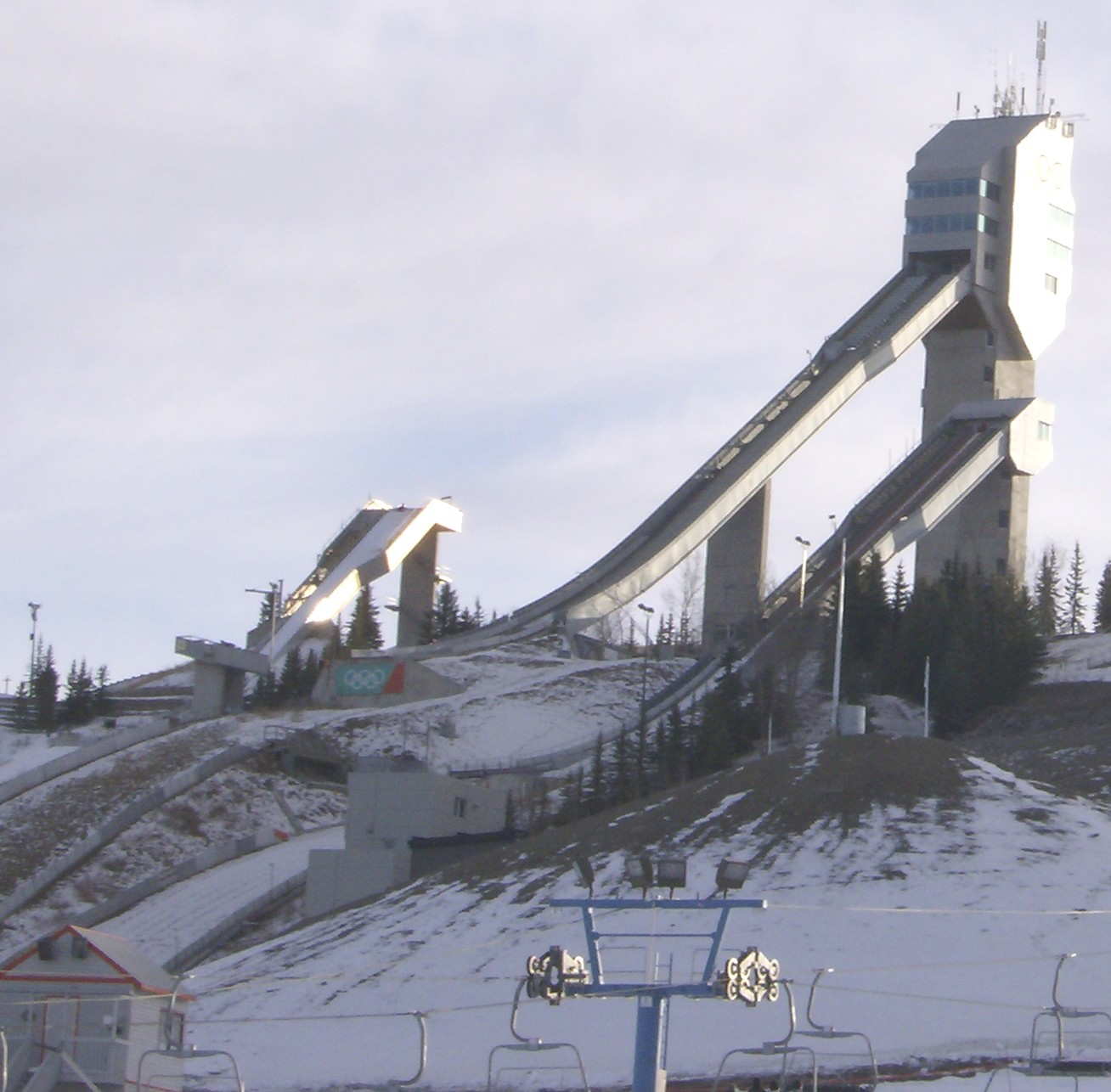
Canada Olympic Park in Calgary, Canada, was the location of this season's final Detour.

- Episode 12: "You've Just Made Me a Millionaire" (September 21, 2004)
- Prize: US$1,000,000
- Winners: Chip and Kim
- Runners-up: Colin and Christie
- Third place: Brandon and Nicole

Locations

- El Nido (Lagen Island)
- El Nido → Calgary, Canada
- Calgary → Banff (Unaired)
- Banff National Park (Sunshine Village – Lookout Mountain)
- Calgary (Canada Olympic Park – Olympic Cauldron)
- Calgary (Canada Olympic Park – Bobsleigh, Luge, and Skeleton Track or Downhill Course)
- Calgary → Dallas, Texas
- Fort Worth (Fort Worth Stockyards – Cowtown Cattlepen Maze)
- Dallas (Trammell Crow Park)

Episode summary

- At the start of this leg, teams were instructed to fly to Calgary, Canada. Teams first had to take a charter flight from El Nido to Manila, and then fly to Calgary. Once there, teams had to travel to Banff National Park and ride the gondola to Lookout Mountain. They then had to hike up a snowy slope to the Continental Divide, where they found their next clue, which directed them to the Olympic Cauldron in Canada Olympic Park.
- This season's final Detour was a choice between Slide and Ride. In Slide, teams had to ride a luge through the Olympic luge course within 34 seconds in order to receive their next clue. In Ride, teams would have had to ride mountain bikes through a snow-covered Olympic slalom ski course within three minutes to receive their next clue. While Brandon and Nicole initially attempted Ride, they eventually switched to Slide.
- After the Detour, teams were instructed to fly to Dallas, Texas. Once there, teams had to go to the Fort Worth Stockyards. There, teams had to enter the giant maze and find a wooden box with their names on it, which contained a picture of the Canada Olympic Park. Using a provided key, they then had to take the picture, find their way out of the maze, and place it on the board. They then retrieved another key that unlocked the glass box on the board, which contained their final clue, which directed them to the finish line: Trammell Crow Park.

Additional notes

- Teams traveled from Calgary to Banff by charter bus. This segment was unaired.
- In this season's final Roadblock, one team member had to build a First Nations teepee outside the Banff Springs Hotel. This task was unaired.
- Legs 12 and 13 aired back-to-back as a special two-hour episode.

== Reception ==
=== Critical response ===
The Amazing Race 5 received positive reviews. Maureen Ryan of the Chicago Tribune called this season a "breakout success". In 2016, this season was ranked 1st out of the first 27 seasons by the Rob Has a Podcast Amazing Race correspondents. Joe Reid of Decider called it "one of its most exciting and dramatically satisfying seasons to date". Kareem Gantt of Screen Rant called it "an otherwise near-perfect season". In 2021, Jane Andrews of Gossip Cop ranked this season as the show's 2nd best season. In 2022, Jason Shomer of Collider ranked this season among the show's top seven seasons. In 2022, Rhenn Taguiam of Game Rant ranked this season as the tenth-best season. In 2024, Taguiam's ranking was updated with this season becoming the fourth-best season.

== Works cited ==
- Castro, Adam-Troy (2006). My Ox Is Broken!. BenBella Books. ISBN 978-1-932100-91-4.
