= San Antonio de Areco Partido =

San Antonio de Areco Partido de San Antonio de Areco
- Department
- Coat of arms

- location of San Antonio de Areco Partido in Buenos Aires Province
- Coordinates: 34°15′S 59°28′W
- Country: Argentina
- Established: October 23, 1730
- Founder: José Ruiz de Arellano
- Seat: San Antonio de Areco

Government
  - Intendant: Francisco Ratto (UCR)

Area
  - Total: 857.59 km^{2} (331.12 sq mi)

Population
  - Total: 21,333
  - Density: 24.876/km^{2} (64.427/sq mi)
- Demonym: Arequero
- Postal Code: B2760
- IFAM: BUE112
- Area Code: 02326
- Patron saint: San Antonio de Padua
- Website: areco.gob.ar

San Antonio de Areco is a partido (county) in the north of Buenos Aires Province, Argentina.

The partido has an area of 852 square kilometres (329 sq mi), and a population of 21,333 (2001 census [INDEC]). It is 113 km (70 mi) from Buenos Aires city, and 175 km (109 mi) from La Plata, and its cabecera or capital is the city of San Antonio de Areco.

== Districts (localidades) ==
- San Antonio de Areco (capital, or cabecera)
- Villa Lía
- Vagues
- Duggan
