= Pablo Rojas Paz =

Argentine writer (1896–1956)

Pablo Rojas Paz (June 26, 1896 - October 1, 1956) was an Argentine writer born in Tucumán. He published essays, poetry, short stories, novels and biographies. For his short story collection El patio de la noche (Night's Playground) he was awarded with the National Prize of Literature, in 1940.

Along with fellow writers Jorge Luis Borges, Alfredo Brandán Caraffa and Ricardo Güiraldes, he founded the Proa magazine, in 1924.

== Selected works ==
- Paisajes y meditaciones (1924) (essays)
- La metáfora y el mundo (1926) (essays)
- Arlequín (1927) (short stories)
- El perfil de nuestra expresión (1929) (essays)
- Hombres grises, montañas azules (1930) (novel)
- Hasta aquí nomás (1936) (novel)
- El patio de la noche (1940) (short stories)
- Alberdi, el ciudadano de la soledad (1940) (non-fiction)
- Biografía de Buenos Aires (1943) (non-fiction)
- Cada cual y su mundo (1944) (essays)
- El arpa remendada (1944) (short stories)
- Campo argentino (1944) (short stories)
- Raíces al cielo (1945) (novel)
- Hombre y momentos de la diplomacia (1946) (short stories)
- Los cocheros de San Blas (1950) (novel)
- Echeverría, pastor de soledades (1952) (non-fiction)
- Mármoles bajo la lluvia (1954) (novel)
- El canto en la llanura (1955) (essays)
- Simón Bolívar (1955) (non-fiction)
- Lo pánico y lo cósmico (1957) (essays)
