= Vagues =

- Town
- Location within Buenos Aires Province
- Coordinates: 34°17′54″S 59°26′42″W
- Country: Argentina
- Province: Buenos Aires
- Partidos: San Antonio de Areco
- Elevation: 37 m (121 ft)
- Time zone: UTC−3 (ART)
- CPA Base: B 2764
- Climate: Dfc

Vagues is a town located in the San Antonio de Areco Partido in the province of Buenos Aires, Argentina. The town has a population of around 100 people.

== Geography ==
Vagues is located 134 km (83 mi) from the city of Buenos Aires.

== History ==
The town was named after Don José Vagués, who fought in multiple wars during the colonial period. A railway station was constructed in the town in 1884, and service to the town began a decade later on the Ferrocarril Central Argentino, which led to rapid growth. Rail service ended in 1992. The station is now a museum.
