= The Venerable Ones =

- Directed by: Manuel Antín
- Written by: Manuel Antín
- Produced by: Jorge Alberto Garber
- Starring: Lautaro Murúa
- Cinematography: Ricardo Aronovich
- Edited by: José Serra
- Release date: 1962
- Running time: 85 minutes
- Country: Argentina
- Language: Spanish

The Venerable Ones (Spanish: Los venerables todos) is a 1962 Argentine film written and directed by Manuel Antín. It was entered into the 1963 Cannes Film Festival.

== Cast ==
- Lautaro Murúa
- Fernanda Mistral
- Walter Vidarte
- Maurice Jouvet
- Raúl Parini
- Beto Gianola
