= Duggan, Buenos Aires =

Duggan
- Town
- Location within Buenos Aires Province
- Coordinates: 34°13′S 59°38′W
- Country: Argentina
- Province: Buenos Aires
- Partidos: San Antonio de Areco
- Elevation: 43 m (141 ft)

Population (2001 Census)
  - Total: 573
- Time zone: UTC−3 (ART)
- CPA Base: B 2764
- Climate: Dfc

Duggan is a town located in the southern portion of the San Antonio de Areco Partido in the province of Buenos Aires, Argentina.

== Geography ==
Duggan is located 128 km (80 mi) from the city of Buenos Aires.

== History ==
A church, the San José Chapel, was constructed in the town in 1929.

== Population ==
According to INDEC, which collects population data for the country, the town had a population of 573 people as of the 2001 census.
