= Intimidad de los parques =

1965 film

- Directed by: Manuel Antín
- Written by: Julio Cortázar (short story), Manuel Antín, Raimundo Calcagno
- Release date: 1965
- Running time: 65 minute
- Country: Argentina
- Language: Spanish

Intimidad de los parques is a 1965 Argentine film directed by Manuel Antín. Like Antín's film Circe, it is based on a short story by Antín's compatriot Julio Cortázar. Cortázar was bitterly disappointed in the film and expressed his sentiments in a pair of letters to Antín written in March and April 1965.

== Cast ==
- Dora Baret
- Ricardo Blume
- Francisco Rabal
