= Charla Baklayan Faddoul =

Reality television personality

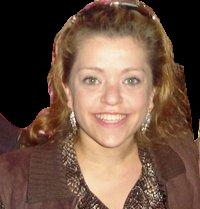
- Baklayan Faddoul in 2010
- Born: Charla Baklayan; July 23, 1976 (age 50); Aleppo, Syria
- Education: Towson University
- Occupation: Reality television personality
- Television: The Amazing Race 5 The Amazing Race All-Stars
- Height: 4 ft 0 in (1.22 m)
- Spouse: David Faddoul
- Children: 1

Charla Baklayan Faddoul (born July 23, 1976) is an Armenian-American reality television personality who appeared on The Amazing Race 5 and The Amazing Race: All-Stars television shows. Charla was born with achondroplasia, the most common form of dwarfism, and is 4' (1.22 m) tall. Her partner on The Amazing Race was her cousin Mirna Hindoyan.

== Early life and career ==
Charla Baklayan was born on July 23, 1976, in Aleppo, Syria to Armenian parents, Garbis and Rosine Baklayan. Her family then immigrated to the United States in 1978. Charla is a graduate of Dulaney High School and Towson University with a degree in Business Management.

== The Amazing Race ==
=== The Amazing Race 5 ===
On the audition tape for The Amazing Race, Charla lifted weights and even carried her teammate on her shoulders to prove her physical strength. During the actual show, Charla carried a 55-pound side of beef, blocked five slap shots by a professional hockey player, ate one kilogram (2.2 lb) of caviar, and ate a portion of an ostrich egg which was the equivalent of two dozen chicken eggs. At the time, Little People of America spokesman Dan Okenfuss said that "What Charla is doing on the show is great, introducing little people to the mainstream world, doing an activity average-sized people are doing."

In January 2004, Faddoul competed on the fifth season of the CBS adventure reality show The Amazing Race with her cousin, Mirna Hindoyan. The two were eliminated in the seventh leg of the race, finishing in 6th place.

=== The Amazing Race 5 finishes ===
- A red placement with a dagger (†) indicates that Charla and Mirna were eliminated.

Roadblocks performed by Faddoul are bolded

Episode	Leg	Destination(s)	Detour choice (underlined)	Roadblock performance	Placement	Notes
1	1	United States → Uruguay	Zips/Chips	No roadblock	5th of 11	
2	2	Uruguay → Argentina	Perro/Tango	Mirna	2nd of 10	
3	3	Argentina	Smooth sailing/Rough riding	**Charla**	2nd of 9	
4	4	Argentina → Russia	Block 5 shots/Drink 1 shot	**Charla**	4th of 8	
5	5	Russia → Egypt	Rock & roll/Hump & ride	**Charla**	2nd of 7	
6	6	Egypt	Herd it/Haul it	Mirna	5th of 7	
7	7	Egypt → Kenya → Tanzania	Buzzing/Busy	**Charla**	6th of 6†	

== The Amazing Race: All-Stars ==
Charla & Mirna competed against ten other teams from previous seasons for a second chance at winning $1 million. This time, Charla helped a cowboy lasso, tie down, and groom a wild horse, ate two feet of kielbasa sausage, donned a suit of armor to lead a horse a half-mile, climbed up an 11-story bamboo scaffold and sky jumped 233 meters (764 feet) from the observation deck of the Macau Tower.

== Other TV appearances ==
On the first episode of MADtv: Season 10, Charla and her cousin Mirna appeared in a skit called "The Amazing Presidential Race". Connie Chung (portrayed by Bobby Lee) narrated the Amazing Race parody featuring a cross-country race between presidential nominees: Bush & Cheney, Kerry & Edwards and Charla & Mirna. Charla & Mirna's presidential teammate Ralph Nader (played by Ike Barinholtz) was "eliminated" from the race when Charla ran over him with a golf cart.

On the "Valerie Demands Dignity" episode of The Comeback, Charla receives her own reality show called "The Littlest Assistant" and is made the aide to a one-time sitcom star played by Lisa Kudrow.

Battle of the Network Reality Stars was a revised version of the Battle of the Network Stars television program. Charla & Mirna competed against men and women from sixteen reality TV shows including Richard Hatch, Evan Marriott from Joe Millionaire, and Brittany Brower from America's Next Top Model, Cycle 4.

Celebrity Poker Showdown: Tournament 6, Game 1 featured reality television all-stars playing for charity. Charla played for the American University of Armenia against Omarosa Manigault-Stallworth from The Apprentice, Andrew Firestone of The Bachelor, Trishelle Cannatella of The Real World: Las Vegas, and Jonny Fairplay of Survivor: Micronesia.

== Personal life ==
Faddoul is married to David Faddoul.
