= Punishment to the Traitor =

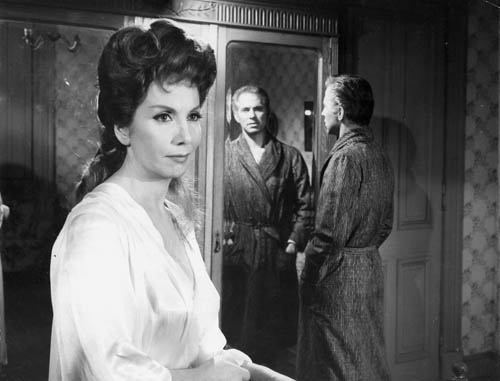
- Eva Dongé and Jorge Barreiro in Punishment for the Traitor - an Argentine film
- Directed by: Manuel Antín
- Written by: Manuel Antin; Andrés Lizarraga; Augusto Roa Bastos (short story)
- Starring: Sergio Renán; Marcela López Rey; Jorge Barreiro
- Cinematography: Julio C. Lavera
- Edited by: Jacinto Cascales
- Music by: Adolfo Morpurgo
- Production company: Producciones Manuel Antin
- Release date: 1966
- Running time: 70 minutes
- Country: Argentina
- Language: Spanish

Punishment to the Traitor (Spanish:Castigo al traidor) is a 1966 Argentine drama film directed by Manuel Antín and starring Sergio Renán, Marcela López Rey and Jorge Barreiro.

== Cast ==
- Sergio Renán
- Marcela López Rey
- Jorge Barreiro
- Eva Donge
- Miguel Ligero
- Aldo Mayo
- Enrique Thibaut

== Bibliography ==
- Helene C. Weldt-Basson. Postmodernism's Role in Latin American Literature: The Life and Work of Augusto Roa Bastos. Springer, 2010.
