= Villa Lía =

- Town
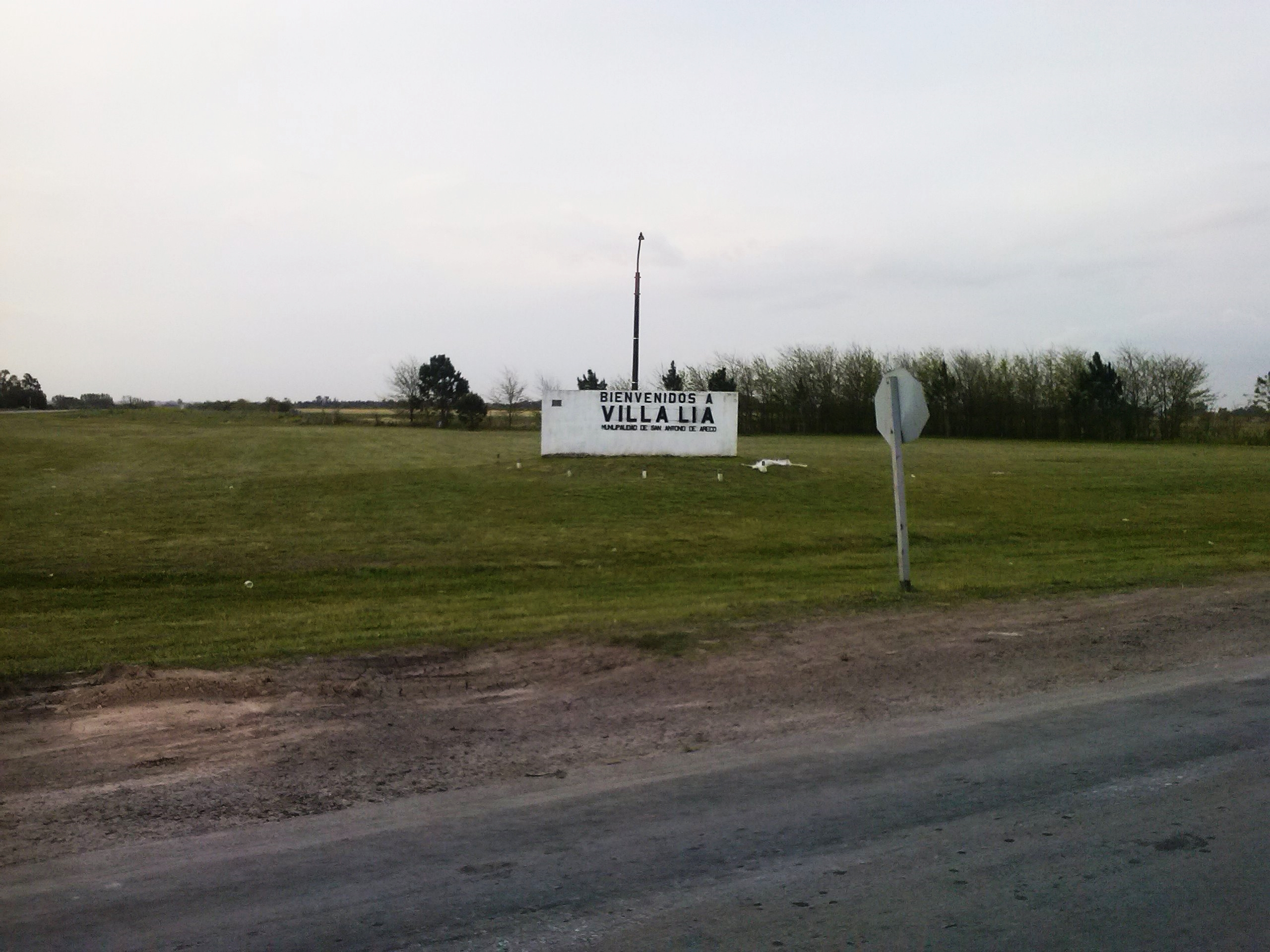
- Entrance to the town

- Location within Buenos Aires Province
- Coordinates: 34°07′S 59°26′W
- Country: Argentina
- Province: Buenos Aires
- Partidos: San Antonio de Areco
- Elevation: 37 m (121 ft)

Population (2001 Census)
  - Total: 962
- Time zone: UTC−3 (ART)
- CPA Base: B 2761
- Climate: Dfc

Villa Lía is a town located in the San Antonio de Areco Partido in the province of Buenos Aires, Argentina.

== Geography ==
Villa Lía is located 73 km (45 mi) from the city of Pilar.

== History ==
The Ferrocarril Cordoba Central constructed a railway station in what is now Villa Lía in 1909. Villa Lía itself was founded in 1920, following a petition by the owner of the land that would become the town. The community was primarily settled by immigrants. A church, the San José Chapel, was constructed in 1929. By the 1950s, the town was home to multiple warehouses.

== Population ==
According to INDEC, which collects population data for the country, the town had a population of 962 people as of the 2001 census.
