= Juan José Güiraldes =

Argentine writer, Air Force man, president of Aerolíneas Argentinas

Air Commodore Juan Jose Guiraldes (January 17, 1917 – September 18, 2003) was an Argentine writer, pilot, news reporter, thinker and airline company president. He was, for a short period during the 1950's, the president of Argentina's flag airline carrier, Aerolíneas Argentinas.

== Biography ==
Güiraldes was the grandson of Manuel Güiraldes, who was once mayor of Buenos Aires, and of Dolores Goñi, and the son of José Antonio Güiraldes Goñi and Elsa Videla Dorma Duportal. He was born in Buenos Aires but is mostly connected by historians to the San Antonio de Areco area.

His uncle was the famed writer, Ricardo Güiraldes.

In 1936, Güiraldes graduated from Argentina's military college at age 19. At the age of 22, in 1939, he was one of the founding members of Argentine airline company, Lineas Aereas Del Estado (LADE). Gŭiraldes later graduated from one of the Royal Air Force colleges in Great Britain.

Güiraldes married Ernestina Holmberg Lanusse. Güiraldes was also the president of the Confederacion Gaucha, a group which organized honoring ceremonies to visiting heads of state in Argentina. In that position, he was able to meet such dignitaries as the then Prince Charles of the United Kingdom.

=== Aerolíneas Argentinas ===
Late during the 1950s, Gũiraldes became the president of Argentina's flag carrier; Aerolíneas Argentinas. He was a busy president when with the airline, seeking to improve the then young air company's economical situation. However, he only lasted a bit over one year at this position. Despite Aerolíneas Argentinas' position as the South American country's flag carrier, it competed for routes during Gūiraldes' tenure with private companies, most notably one led by brigadier Juan Fabri.

Notably, as president of Aerolíneas Argentinas, Gūiraldes was able to convince the then Argentine president, Arturo Frondizi, to buy six Comet jet airplanes for the airline.

=== Book ===
Once retired both as an airline businessman and Air Force pilot, Gūirales published one book, named "Los Gauchos".

== Honors ==
The city of San Antonio de Areco decided, soon after Gūiraldes' death in 2003, to honor him by naming a local park after him.

== See also ==
- List of Argentines
