= Ricardo Güiraldes =

Argentine novelist and poet (1886–1927)

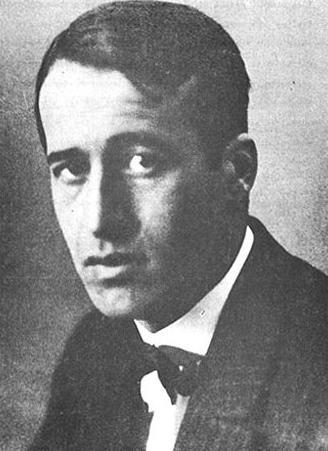
Ricardo Güiraldes (c.1906)

Ricardo Güiraldes (13 February 1886 – 8 October 1927) was an Argentine novelist and poet, one of the most significant Argentine writers of his era, particularly known for his 1926 novel Don Segundo Sombra, set amongst the gauchos.

== Life ==
Güiraldes was born in Buenos Aires, the second son of a wealthy family of the old landowning aristocracy. His mother was Dolores Goñi, descendant of Ruiz de Arellano, who founded the village of San Antonio de Areco in 1730. Manuel Güiraldes, his father, later intendente (governmentally appointed mayor) of Buenos Aires, was a cultured, educated man, interested in art. Ricardo inherited that predilection; in his youth he sketched rural scenes and painted in oils.

When Güiraldes was one year old, he travelled with his family to Europe, living for four years in Paris near the Rue Saint-Claude. By the age of six, he spoke not only Spanish but French and German. Indeed, French was his first language, and French-language literature would leave a strong mark on his literary style and tastes.

Güiraldes's childhood and youth were divided between the family ranch, La Porteña in San Antonio de Areco, and Buenos Aires. In San Antonio he came into contact with the world of the gauchos, which would figure prominently in his novels Raucho and Don Segundo Sombra; there, too, he met Segundo Ramírez, upon whom he based the title character of the latter work. He loved the country life, but suffered from asthma that sometimes limited his own physical activity, though he generally presented an image of physical vigor.

He was educated by several female teachers and, later, by a Mexican engineer, Lorenzo Ceballos, who recognized and encouraged his literary ambitions. He studied in various institutes and completed his bachillerato at the age of 16. Güiraldes was not a brilliant student; at the Colegio Lacordaire, the Vertiz Institute and the Instituto Libre de Segunda Enseñanza, he studied both architecture and law, but never practiced either one. He did make several attempts at business, all unsuccessful. He traveled to Europe in 1910 in the company of his friend Roberto Leviller, then travelled with another friend, his future brother-in-law Adán Deihl, with whom he visited Italy, Greece, Constantinople, Egypt, Japan, China, Russia, India, Ceylon, and Germany before settling in Paris, where (after his father decided he had had enough of paying the costs of his son's idleness) he stayed with the sculptor Alberto Lagos (to whom he later dedicated Xaimaca), and where he decided to become a writer.

Despite that decision, Güiraldes threw himself into the French capital's social whirl, practically abandoning his literary ambitions. But one day he unpacked some draft stories he had written about rural Argentina and set to work; these would eventually become his Cuentos de muerte y de sangre ("Stories of death and of blood").

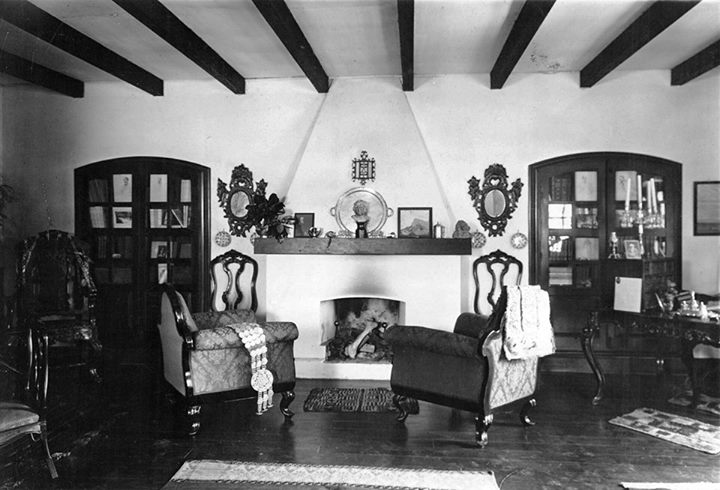
A room of the Güiraldes' house in San Antonio de Areco, currently a gaucho museum.

He read the stories to friends, who encouraged him to publish them. Even the early drafts already showed a distinct, individual style.

Finally truly committed to literature, he returned to Buenos Aires in 1912, becoming part of the circle of Alejandro Bustillo. On October 13, 1913, he married Adelina del Carril, also from one of the city's leading families, whom he had first met in 1905. In 1913–1914, he published several stories in the magazine Caras y Caretas; in 1915, these and others were published as Cuentos de muerte y de sangre; earlier that year he had published a book of poetry, El cencerro de cristal. He was encouraged in his writing by his wife and by Leopoldo Lugones, but when these early works did not meet with a receptive public, Güiraldes withdrew them from circulation, gathered up the unsold copies, and threw them into a well. His wife managed to rescue some; these surviving, water-damaged copies are now prized by book collectors.

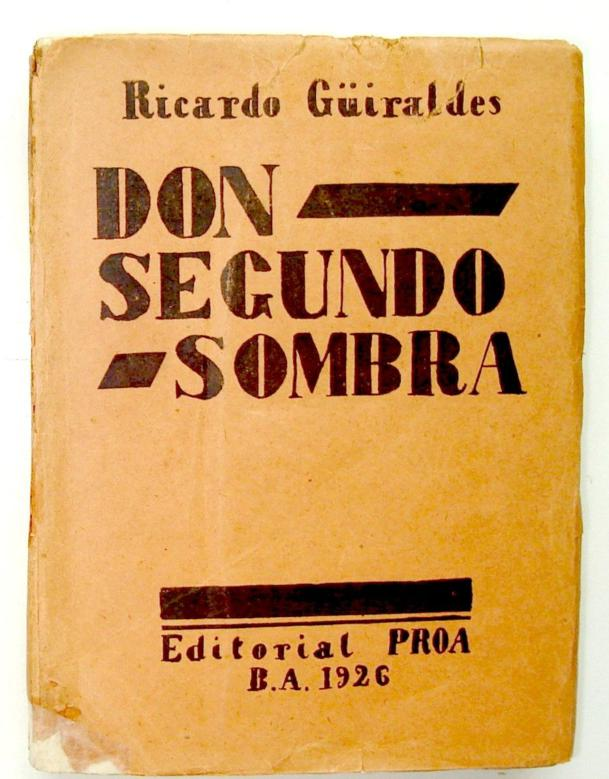
The first edition of Don Segundo Sombra (1926).

At the end of 1916, the couple traveled to the Pacific Ocean, to Cuba, and to Jamaica, where he wrote a "theatrical caprice" called El reloj ("The clock", never published). These travels would eventually lead to his 1923 novel Xaimaca, but long before that, in 1917, came his first novel Raucho, followed in 1918 by a short novel Un idilio de estación ("A Season's Idyll") in Horacio Quiroga's magazine El cuento ilustrado; this would eventually be revised and published as a well-received book in 1922, with the new title Rosaura.

In 1919, with his wife, Güiraldes again traveled to Europe. In Paris he established contact with many French writers and frequented literary salons and bookstores; there, too, he began Don Segundo Sombra. He has been described as particularly influenced by his friend Valery Larbaud, but Güiraldes's English-language translator Harriet de Onís believes that influence to have been overstated. Güiraldes returned to Argentina, then went back to Europe in 1922, where besides returning to Paris he passed some time in Port de Pollença, Mallorca, where he rented a house.

In this period he underwent an intellectual and spiritual change. He became interested in theosophy and Eastern philosophy, seeking spiritual peace; this is strongly reflected in his late poetry.

At the same time, Güiraldes's writing became more accepted in his native Buenos Aires, where he became a supporter of new avant-garde writers; he was something of an elder and teacher to the Florida group. In 1924, along with Alfredo Brandán Caraffa (1898–1978), Jorge Luis Borges, and Pablo Rojas Paz he founded the short-lived magazine Proa, which was not particularly successful in its home city but met with a better reception elsewhere in Latin America. Güiraldes also co-founded the Frente Ứnico, opposed to pompierismo (the use of dry or pompous academic language in writing), and collaborated in the publication of the magazine Martín Fierro.

After closing down the magazine, Güiraldes focused on finishing Don Segundo Sombra, which he completed in March 1926.

In 1927, intending to head back to India because of his increasing interest in Hinduism, Güiraldes traveled once more to France. He went first to Arcachon, but it developed that he was sick with Hodgkin's disease. He was brought to Paris by ambulance, was met there by his wife, and died in the house of his friend, the painter Alfredo González Garaño (1886–1969). Güiraldes's body was brought back to Buenos Aires and finally entombed in San Antonio de Areco.

His nephew was the president of Aerolíneas Argentinas, Juan José Güiraldes.

== Works ==
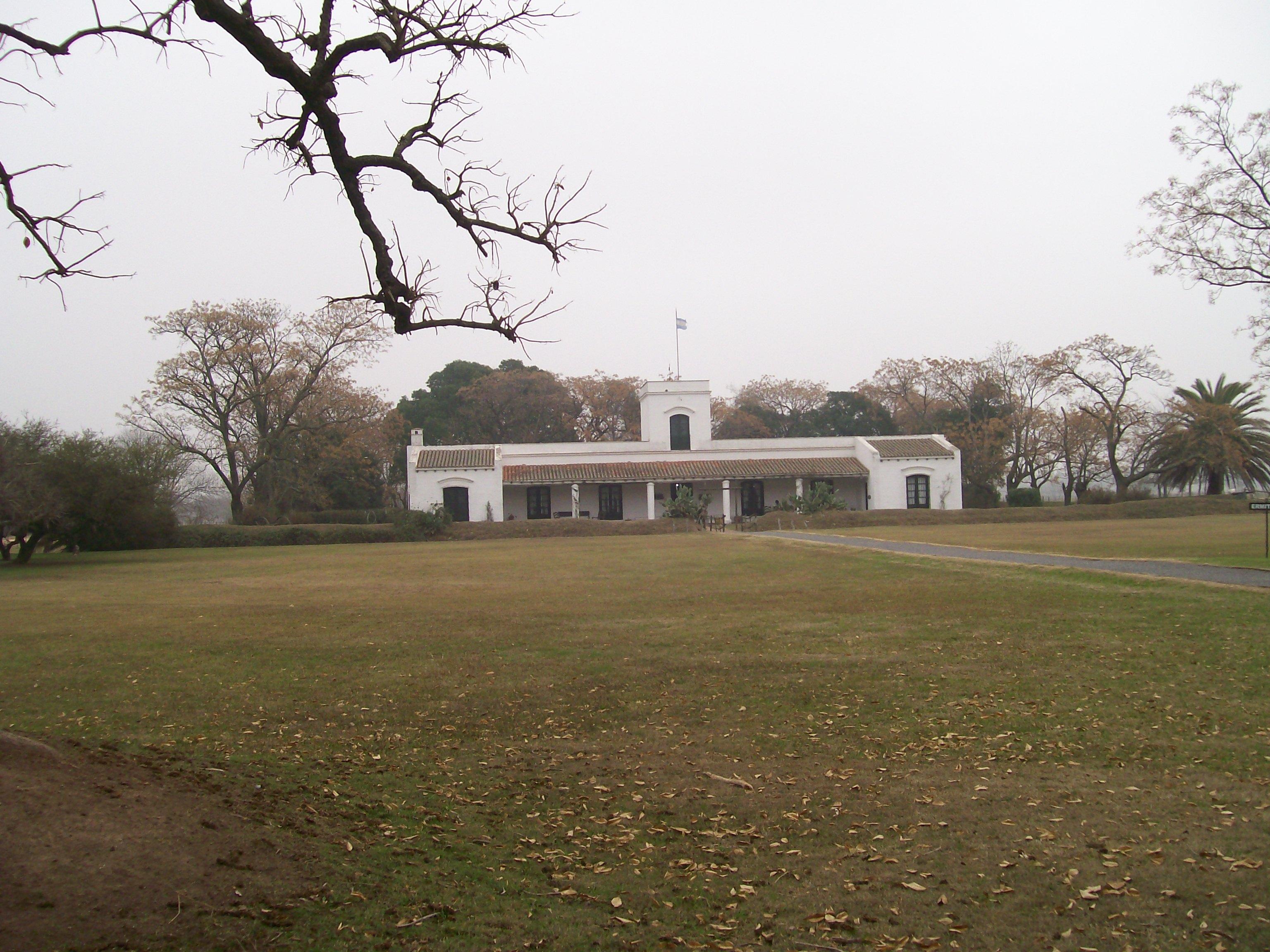
The home of Alfredo González Garaño, now the Güiraldes Museum, in 2008

Each year links to its corresponding "[year] in literature" or "[year] in poetry" article:

- 1915: El cencerro de cristal (poetry)
- 1915: Cuentos de muerte y sangre (short stories)
- Aventuras grotescas (short stories)
- Trilogía cristiana (short stories)
- 1917: Raucho (novel)
- 1917: Un idilio de estación, later revised as Rosaura (1922), published in Rosaura y siete cuentos. Short novel.
- 1923: Xaimaca (fictionalized travel story).
- 1926: Don Segundo Sombra (novel)
- 1928: Poemas místicos (posthumously published, poems)
- 1928: Poemas solitarios (posthumously published poems)
- 1929: Seis relatos (posthumously published short stories)
- 1932: El sendero (posthumously published)
- 1936: El libro bravo (posthumously published poems)
- 1954: Pampa (posthumously published)
- 1952: El pájaro blanco (poem)
