= Manuel Antín =

Argentine film director and screenwriter (1926–2024)

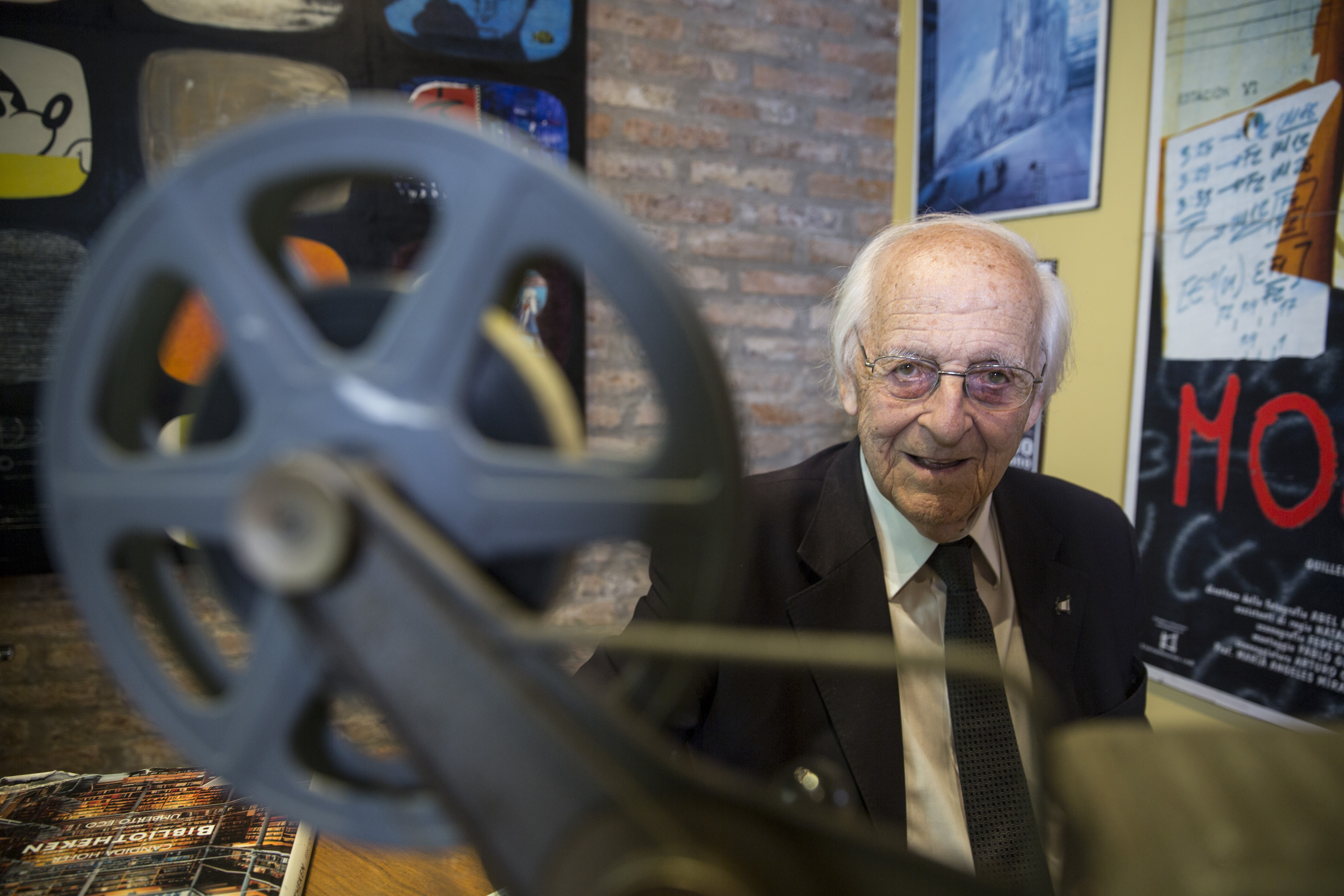
- Antín in 2019
- Born: February 27, 1926; Las Palmas, Chaco, Argentina
- Died: September 5, 2024 (aged 98)
- Occupations: Film director, screenwriter
- Notable work: La cifra impar, Circe, Don Segundo Sombra
- Awards: Golden Palm nominations at Cannes Film Festival, Golden Bear nomination at Berlin International Film Festival

Manuel Antín (February 27, 1926 – September 5, 2024) was an Argentine film director and screenwriter.

== Life and career ==
Manuel Antín was born in Las Palmas, Chaco Province, in 1926. He first wrote for Argentine television in 1956 and made his directorial debut in 1962 with his first film: La cifra impar (Odd Number), based on a story by Julio Cortázar, (Cartas de mamá). The film The Venerable Ones earned him a Golden Palm nomination at the Cannes Film Festival, and his Circe (1964), a Golden Bear nomination at the 14th Berlin International Film Festival. Perhaps his best-known film, the bucolic Don Segundo Sombra (1969), earned him a second Golden Palm nomination at Cannes.

In 1983, he was designated as director of the Instituto Nacional de Cine in the government of Raúl Alfonsín.

In 1991, he founded the Universidad del Cine, an institution devoted to film teaching and production.

In 2023, the University of Buenos Aires gave him the title of DR. Honoris Causa.

Antín died on September 5, 2024, at the age of 98.

== Filmography ==
- La Invitación (1982)
- Allá lejos y hace tiempo (Far Away and Long Ago) (1978)
- La Sartén por el mango (In the Driver's Seat) (1972)
- Juan Manuel de Rosas (1972)
- Don Segundo Sombra (1969)
- Castigo al traidor (Punishment to the Traitor) (1966)
- Psique y sexo (segment "La Estrella del desierto") (1965)
- Intimidad de los parques (1965)
- Circe (1964)
- La Cifra impar (Odd Number) (1962)
- Los Venerables todos (The Venerable Ones) (1962)

== Bibliography ==
- OUBIÑA, DAVID (1994). Los directores del cine argentino: Manuel Antin. Centro Editor de América Latina. ISBN 978-950-12-0715-6
- SÁNDEZ, MARIANA (2010). El cine de Manuel. Un recorrido sobre la obra de Manuel Antin. Capital intelectual. ISBN 978-987-614-243-4
- ANTIN, MANUEL y BURMAN, DANIEL (2016). Diálogos de cine. Antin-Burman. Ediciones Treintayseis. ISBN 978-987-45601-8-6
- FERNÁNDEZ, MARIÁNGELES y SABANÉS, DIEGO (2026). Manuel Antin, escritor de imágenes. Cortázar, Borges, Marechal y la generación que cambió el cine argentino. EUDEBA. ISBN 978-950-23-3622-0
