= San Antonio de Areco =

City in Buenos Aires Province, Argentina

- City
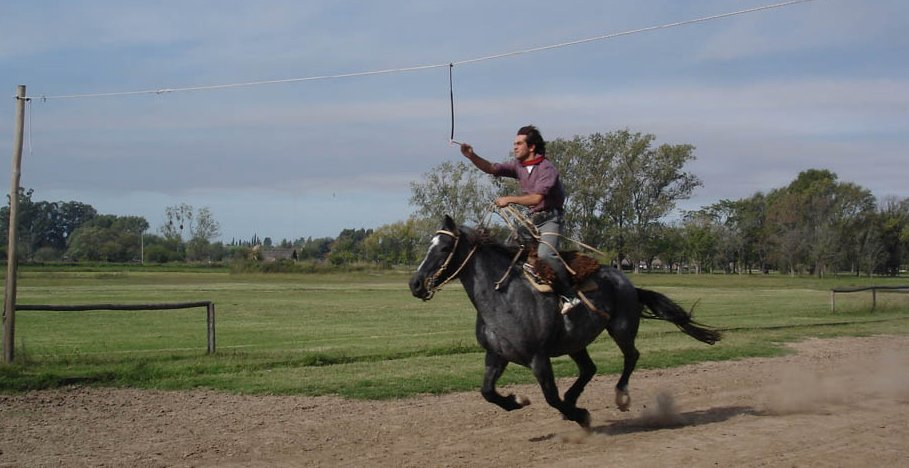
- A modern-day gaucho takes a stab at Carrera de sortija (ring-spearing contest)

- Coat of arms

- Location in Argentina San Antonio de Areco (Buenos Aires Province)
- Coordinates: 34°15′S 59°28′W
- Country: Argentina
- Province: Buenos Aires
- Partido: San Antonio de Areco
- Founded: October 23, 1730
- Elevation: 26 m (85 ft)

Population (2010 census)
  - Total: 23,114
- CPA Base: B 2760
- Area code: +54 2326

San Antonio de Areco is a city in northern Buenos Aires Province, Argentina, and administrative seat of the partido of San Antonio de Areco. It is located on the Areco River 113 km (70 mi) away from Buenos Aires city, the country's capital.

San Antonio de Areco was founded in 1730, under the protection of a chapel inaugurated by José Ruiz de Arellano. It has been declared city of historic national interest by the Argentine Government and is recognized for being the homeland of Don Segundo Sombra, the immortal character of the novel written by Ricardo Güiraldes. The city is the home of the Museo Gauchesco Ricardo Güiraldes. Each year in November, the city holds the Día de la Tradición (Tradition Day) gaucho celebration. Since 2001, San Antonio de Areco is sister city of Laredo, Texas in the United States.

== Geographical features ==
The city has 23,114 inhabitants (INDEC, 2010), against 17,764 inhabitants registered in the previous census (INDEC, 2001).

San Antonio de Areco is located in the north east region of Buenos Aires province.

The climate is humid subtropical.

== Notable people ==
- Juan José Güiraldes Ricardo Güiraldes' nephew and one time president of Aerolíneas Argentinas
