= Theatre of Argentina =

Buenos Aires is one of the world's capitals of theatre. The Teatro Colón is a national landmark for opera and classical performances; built at the end of the 19th century, its acoustics are considered the best in the world, and has undergone a major refurbishment in order to preserve its outstanding sound characteristics, the French-romantic style, the Golden Room (a minor auditorium targeted to Chamber Music performances), and the museum at the entrance. With its theatre scene of national and international caliber, Corrientes Avenue is synonymous with the art. It is thought of as the street that never sleeps, and sometimes referred to as the Broadway of Buenos Aires. Many careers in acting, music, and film have begun in its many theaters. The Teatro General San Martín is one of the most prestigious, along Corrientes Avenue, and the Teatro Nacional Cervantes functions as the national stage theater of Argentina. The Teatro Argentino de La Plata, El Círculo in Rosario, Independencia in Mendoza, and Libertador in Córdoba are also prominent. Griselda Gambaro, Copi, Roberto Cossa, Marco Denevi, Carlos Gorostiza, Alberto Vaccarezza and Mauricio Kartun are a few of the more prominent Argentine playwrights. Julio Bocca, Jorge Donn, José Neglia, and Norma Fontenla are some of the great ballet dancers of the modern era.

== History ==
The history of Argentine theatre goes back to the sixteenth and seventeenth centuries, with public performances put on by Jesuits or missionaries in attempts to convert the local Indigenous population to Christianity. These performances were irregular until 1747. In 1757, the first outdoor theatre was built, though it only lasted until 1761.

The first viceroy, Juan José de Vértiz y Salcedo, created the colony's first theatre, La Ranchería, in 1783 with the help of an actor named Francisco Velarde, who had proposed the idea initially and acted as the theatre's manager. The construction of it faced backlash from the church, to which Vértiz compromised by establishing that every staged play had to be approved by them first.

In this stage, in 1786, a tragedy entitled Siripo had its premiere. Siripo is now a lost work (only the second act is conserved), and can be considered the first Argentine stage play, because it was written by Buenos Aires poet Manuel José de Lavardén, it was premiered in Buenos Aires, and its plot was inspired by an historical episode of the early colonization of the Río de la Plata Basin: the destruction of Sancti Spiritu colony by aboriginals in 1529. La Ranchería theatre operated until its destruction in a fire in 1792. The second theatre stage in Buenos Aires was Teatro Coliseo, opened in 1804 during the term of Viceroy Rafael de Sobremonte. It was the nation's longest-continuously operating stage.

The musical creator of the Argentine National Anthem, Blas Parera, earned fame as a theatre score writer during the early 19th century. The genre suffered during the regime of Juan Manuel de Rosas, though it flourished alongside the economy later in the century. The national government gave Argentine theatre its initial impulse with the establishment of the Colón Theatre, in 1857, which hosted classical and operatic, as well as stage performances. Antonio Petalardo's successful 1871 gambit on the opening of the Teatro Opera, inspired others to fund the growing art in Argentina.

The 1874 murder of Juan Moreira, a persecuted troubadour, provided dramatists with a new hero. Possessing all the elements of tragedy, the anecdote inspired Eduardo Gutiérrez's 1884 play Juan Moreira, and the work made the gaucho. Gaucho's appeared frequently on the Argentine stage in subsequent years. Spanish literature and influence began to overtake the gaucho, following the 1897 relocation to Argentina of Spanish theatre producer María Guerrero, and her company, who popularized professional stage theatre in the country. Making the Teatro Odeón a nerve centre for the medium, her evolved stagecraft led to the creation of the national stage, the Cervantes Theatre, in 1921.

In the late 1800s, Spanish zarzuela was influential in the region, so much so that Buenos Aires eventually became the Latin American capital for zarzuela. This eventually led to the creation of a new Argentine form, known as zarzuela criolla.

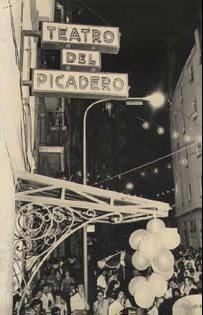
The "Open Theatre".

The wave of European Immigration in Argentina created a need for a cultural shift in theatre, partially tied to the growth of the middle class. This immigration boom also influenced the growth of a form of theatre known as sainete criollo, which focused on the European-immigrant experience with class and culture.

This need for cultural growth in the form of theatre was addressed by Florencio Sánchez, a pioneer in professional theatre locally and in Uruguay. Local colour became the primary inspiration for Roberto Arlt, Gregorio de Laferrère, Armando Discépolo, Antonio Cunill Cabanellas, and Roberto Payró during the 1920s and 1930s, while also helping amateur theatre revive locally. The Teatro Independiente movement created a counterweight to professional theatre by wanting to reintroduce grotesque subject matter back into plays. The movement lasted between 1950 and 1955, and inspired a new generation of young dramatists such as Copi, Agustín Cuzzani, Osvaldo Dragún, and Carlos Gorostiza.

Gorostiza and other self-trained dramatists also popularized Realism in the Argentine theatre after 1950, a genre advanced by Ricardo Halac, Roberto Cossa, and among others. Griselda Gambaro and Eduardo Pavlovsky popularized the theatre of the absurd in Argentina after 1960, a genre that found local variant in the grotesque works of Julio Mauricio and Roberto Cossa, whose La Nona became an iconic character in the Argentine theatre in 1977.

Argentina's National Reorganization Process posed the greatest challenge to the development of local theatre since the Rosas era of the mid-19th century. Numerous actors, playwrights and technicians emigrated after 1976, though the pressures on artists were loosen around 1980. Seizing the opportunity, playwright Osvaldo Dragún marshalled colleagues to restore an abandoned sparkplug factory in order to organize the Teatro Abierto or Open Theatre movement which, between 1981 and 1985, sought to defy censorship and the erasure of theatre under the military dictatorship.

The theatre thrived before and after the 1983 return to democracy. Established playwrights and directors such as Norman Briski, Roberto Cossa, Lito Cruz, Carlos Gorostiza, Pacho O'Donnell, and Pepe Soriano, and younger dramatists such as Luis Agostoni, Carlos María Alsina, Eduardo Rovner, and Rafael Spregelburd. Works by these and other local authors, as well as local productions of international works, are among the over 80 theatre works presented every weekend in Buenos Aires, alone. The stage also plays host to well-known comedy acts, such as those of satirist Enrique Pinti, female impersonator Antonio Gasalla, storyteller Luis Landriscina, and the musical comedy troupe, Les Luthiers.

== Argentine Yiddish Theater ==
Jacob Ben-Ami as Hamlet in Teatro Soleil. Buenos Aires.1930s. Foto: Courtesy of Prof Dr. Susana Skura.
