= Honorio Siccardi =

Argentine composer, pianist, and teacher (1897–1963)

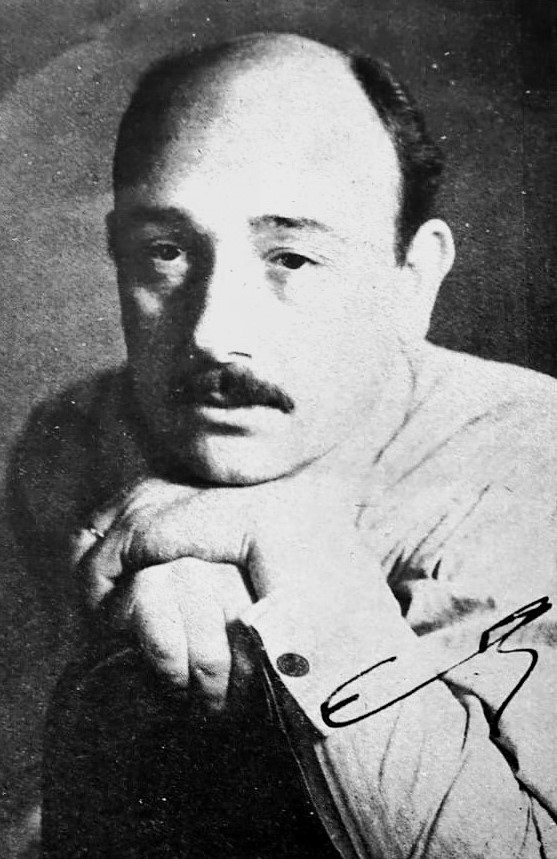
- Siccardi, c. 1940
- Born: 13 September 1897; Buenos Aires, Argentina
- Died: 10 September 1963 (aged 65); Buenos Aires, Argentina
- Occupations: Composer; pianist; music educator; choir director; musicologist
- Years active: 1910s–1963
- Musical career
- Formerly of: Grupo renovación (1931–1944)

Honorio Siccardi (13 September 1897 – 10 September 1963) was an Argentine composer, pianist, and teacher. He was associated with the Buenos Aires–based Grupo renovación (1929–1944), a circle linked to the International Society for Contemporary Music (ISCM).

His works include compositions for piano, voice, chamber ensembles, orchestra, and opera. Scholarship describes his musical language as combining neoclassical traits with modernist procedures, including occasional use of twelve-tone techniques, and employing wide chromaticism that has been interpreted as a form of "virtual atonality". In part of his catalogue, he also drew on topics derived from Argentine popular and folk music.

== Life and education ==
Siccardi began his musical training in Lomas de Zamora with Elena M. de Nóbrega and later studied in Buenos Aires at the Liceo Musical Beruti with Pablo Beruti, receiving teaching diplomas in piano (1914) and harmony (1914), and with Ernesto Drangosch, receiving a higher piano diploma (1916). Among the teachers acknowledged in Argentine sources as part of his formation are Felipe Boero and Gilardo Gilardi; Siccardi also dedicated his book Actividades musicales argentinas (1955) "A mis maestros".

Between 1920 and 1923, he pursued advanced studies in Italy at the Regio Conservatorio di Musica "Arrigo Boito" in Parma, completing the Corso principale di Composizione and receiving the Diploma di Licenza Normale (1923) with highest distinctions. During this period, he developed a close connection with Italian composer Gian Francesco Malipiero and also studied conducting (Zuelli), music history (Guido Gasparini), dramatic literature (Tonelli) and organ (Ferrari Trecate). An extensive correspondence between Siccardi and Malipiero is preserved in the Fondo Gian Francesco Malipiero at the Fondazione Giorgio Cini (Venice), and related materials are also held in the Siccardi family archive in Dolores (Buenos Aires Province).

== Career ==
After returning to Argentina, Siccardi combined teaching and performance activity. In 1916, in the city of Dolores, he co-founded the Conservatorio Wagner with the violinist Luis Roig, where he taught and appeared in concerts as accompanist and soloist. He worked as a music teacher in the Colegio Nacional and the Escuela Normal of Dolores, and taught piano, singing, harmony, history, and composition privately and in conservatories (including institutions associated with the names Wagner, Jacobo Ficher, and Honorio Siccardi). His students cited in published sources include the composer Washington Castro, the composer and pianist Manolo Juárez, the guitarist Abel Fleury, and the composer Hilda Dianda.

He founded sixteen choirs between 1924 and 1946, created one of the country's early music libraries (1926) at the Colegio Nacional of Dolores, and established a music seminar (1936) at the Escuela Normal of Dolores. In parallel, he developed sustained literary and musicological work, using historical and theoretical topics in lecture-concerts and publishing in newspapers and specialized journals.

In 1931, he joined the Grupo renovación and served as its secretary from 1937 until the group dissolved in 1944. The group promoted contemporary Argentine music through critical discussion, public concerts, publication initiatives, and international projection, and in 1932, became the Argentine section of the ISCM.

== Music ==
According to Ana María Otero's catalogue (1993), Siccardi's output comprises more than 200 works across chamber, orchestral, choral, and vocal-orchestral genres, as well as ballet and opera. Early works include the String Quartet No. 1 (1922). The string quartet occupied a central place in his production: he composed seven quartets, the last dedicated to the quartet of Carlos Pessina (1955) and noted in Otero's catalogue for timbral exploration, including harmonics and extended string techniques. His chamber catalogue also includes duos, trios and mixed ensembles (including wind groups) and works involving voice.

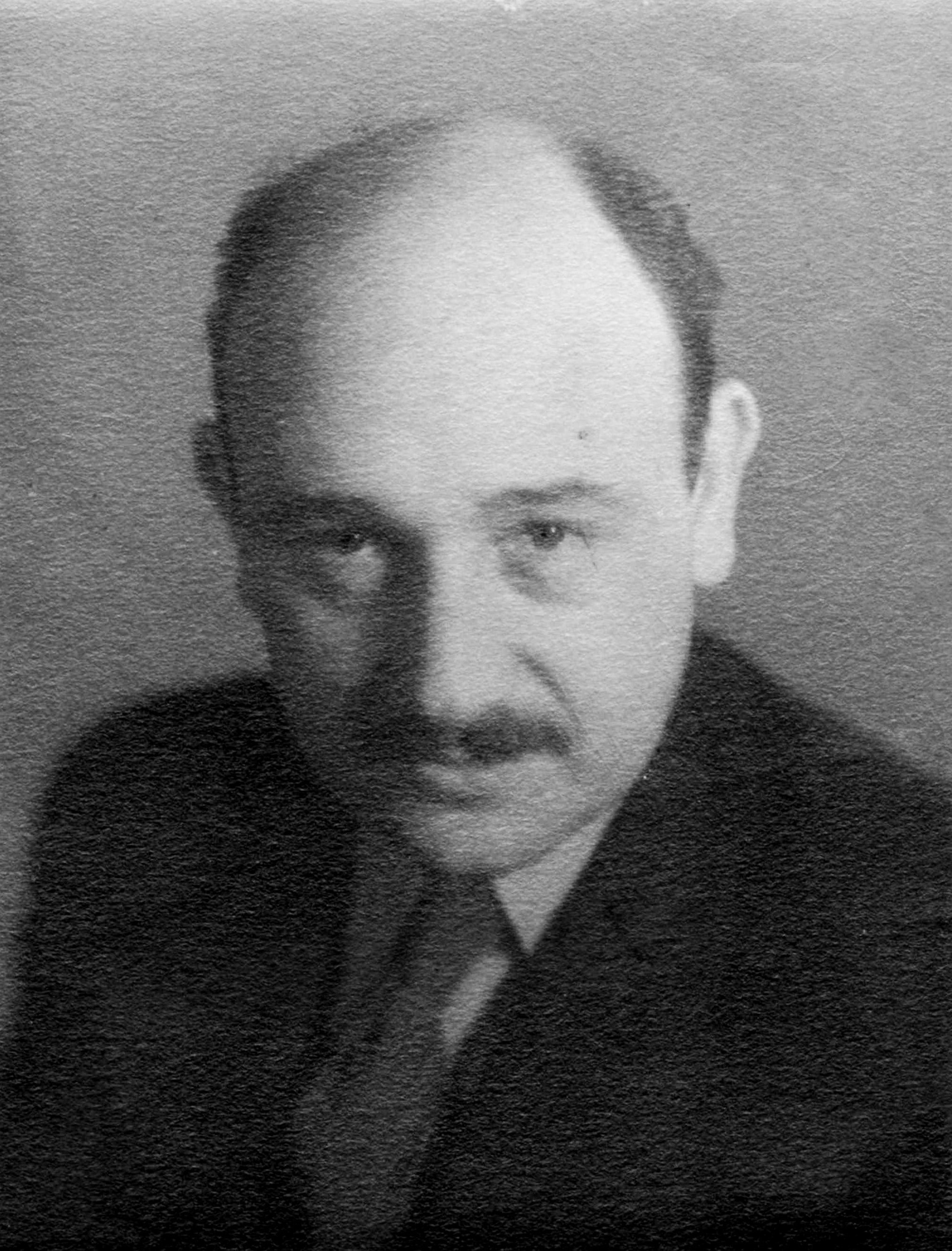
Siccardi in the Lomas de Zamora studio, c. 1940

In the vocal-orchestral domain, works documented in the catalogue include Las nueve musas (1953), on a text by Francisco de Quevedo y Villegas, and Sogno verace (1951) for choir and orchestra, incorporating rhythmic recitation in jitanjáfora. Vocal music constitutes a substantial portion of his oeuvre, ranging from songs for voice and piano to choral works and pieces with instrumental or orchestral accompaniment; in a number of cases, sources indicate that Siccardi prepared Italian versions of Spanish-language poems for publication or performance.

Among his orchestral works, Otero's catalogue highlights the Second Argentine Suite (1945), a three-movement work (Reflejos (La Laguna de Chascomús), Añoranzas del Tata Viejo, and Jineteada) that incorporates six guitars into the orchestral forces. He also composed a Symphony (1950), described in secondary coverage as notable for expansive instrumentation including the full saxophone family, extended flute and clarinet families and an enlarged percussion section; one movement incorporates the traditional theme "Décima de Pavón".

Siccardi cultivated concertante genres as well. Sources cited in the Spanish-language biography summarize five concertos featuring solo instruments (piano, violin, guitar, bandoneon, and two pianos). His Violin Concerto (1942) received a mention of honor from the Edwin A. Fleisher Collection (Philadelphia). In addition, his ballet output includes Títeres (ballet de cámara) and Buenos Aires; documentation in the archive is reported to preserve notes on staging and lighting for Buenos Aires, including "lighting plans" coordinated with musical parameters.

In 1937, Siccardi composed and published songs on texts by Amado Villar, which are listed in Otero's catalogue as receiving an ISCM award in connection with the 1939 festival (Warsaw/Kraków).

== Touring activity ==
Between 1927 and 1963, Siccardi developed a sustained touring project he called the Gira pro Difusión de la Música Argentina, and later, the Gira Mundial pro Difusión de la Música Argentina. The Spanish-language biography summarizes the project as comprising more than 200 concerts and visiting around seventy cities in Argentina, Chile, Brazil, Uruguay, Paraguay, Spain, Italy, and France; programs included works by Argentine composers (such as Julián Aguirre, Constantino Gaito, Alberto Ginastera, Luis Gianneo, Floro Ugarte, and Alberto Williams) alongside Siccardi's own music and selections from the European concert tradition.

Documentation studied by Ana María Otero reconstructs the tours as a long-term cultural initiative that combined piano performance with spoken lectures and educational commentary, and in some instances collaborations with soloists, choirs and chamber ensembles. In this model, Siccardi acted as a performer and as a mediator between composers, audiences and cultural institutions, leaving extensive organizational and correspondence records that help document the continuity and scope of the project.

== Archive and legacy ==
The Archivo Histórico Musical "Honorio Siccardi" is a family-held collection in Dolores (Buenos Aires Province) preserving manuscripts, printed scores, programs, press clippings, photographs, and sound materials related to Siccardi's activity and touring project. According to press coverage, the collection began to be assembled by Siccardi in 1917 through systematic preservation of scores, programs, correspondence, and other documents tied to his artistic and pedagogical activity. In 2024, the Municipality of Dolores declared the archive to be of municipal and cultural interest (Resolution No. 36/24).

== Awards and distinctions ==
Siccardi received awards and distinctions in Argentina and abroad. Otero's catalogue and related sources list recognition for Títeres (Municipality of Buenos Aires, 1936) and a mention of honor for the Violin Concerto (Edwin A. Fleisher Collection, Philadelphia). Municipal music prizes are documented in Ana María Mondolo's study of awards granted by the City of Buenos Aires. His songs on texts by Amado Villar are also listed as awarded by the ISCM in connection with the 1939 festival (Warsaw/Kraków).

== Selected writings ==
Sources on Siccardi list publications including:

- Síntesis de instrumentación (with Jacobo Ficher), 1942
- Doménico Scarlatti a través de sus sonatas, 1945
- La música en la Divina Comedia, 1953
- Reseña de las Actividades Musicales en la República Argentina, 1955

== Works catalogues ==
A detailed list of works is available through:

- Chronological list of compositions at Wikipedia (in Spanish)
- IMSLP: List of works by Honorio Siccardi
