= The Story of the Man Who Turned into a Dog =

Play written by Osvaldo Dragún

The Story of the Man Who Turned into a Dog (Historia del hombre que se convirtió en perro) is a short play written by Osvaldo Dragún as part of his Historias para ser contadas (Stories to be Told), a series of short plays. It is the third short play in the series. The original production premiered with the independent theatre group Teatro Popular Fray Mocho in 1957. The Story of the Man Who Turned into a Dog, as well as the other Historias can be classified into many genres of theatre, including Theatre of the Absurd, Metatheatre and Magic realism.

== Characters ==
- Actor #1 - The Man
- Actor #2 - portrays characters of the boss and society
- Actor #3 - portrays characters of the boss and society
- Actress - The wife
- Harper - Dog

== Synopsis ==
Four actors introduce the story by explaining how they learned of the story of the man who turned into a dog, and then explain that they will demonstrate and play this story out for the audience. Actor #1 portrays the Man Who Turned into a Dog, Actors #2 and #3 portray the boss and the people he must work for, and Actress portrays his wife. The Man is in need of a job but is told by Actors 2 and 3 that he can only be given a job if someone else dies, retires or is fired. After a watchman's dog dies following 25 years of service, the Man reluctantly agrees to become the new watchdog. He must live in the doghouse and eat dog food for the pay of 1 dollar a day, even though it drives him and his wife apart. Gradually, the man assumes dog-like behavior and is consistently denied other job opportunities that open up. After moving out to live in an apartment with other women so she can afford rent, his wife announces that she is pregnant and she is afraid her baby will be born a dog. The Man has an outburst and runs away, fully assuming the role of a dog. By the end of the play, Actor 1 can only bark and is no longer able to shift between man and dog.

== Themes and Dragún's social critique ==
- Anti-capitalism
- Theatre of the Oppressed
- Dehumanization
- The importance of spoken language
  The contrast between human speech and the barking required of the man in his job as a watchdog could hardly be more stark, and at the end of the story he has entirely lost the ability to speak. The devaluation of language itself is not overly produced in Dragún's work, for the linguistic patterns remain largely coherent. Nevertheless, the use of language as a mechanism of both deceit and understanding is in keeping with the basic suspiciousness toward language's surface appearance that characterizes the absurd.

Other prominent themes in Dragún's work and the Historias para ser contadas series include: "the criticism of censorship, repression and internal exile."

== Writing style ==
Osvaldo Dragún was known for bringing the Epic theatre of Brecht to Latin America, and combining modern Argentine theatre technique with classical themes. Much of his work features "narrative foregrounding," which "forces the audience to observe the narrative process." Characteristics of Dragún's plays that are separate from Brecht include emphasis on the absurd, character underdevelopment and a combination of both narrative and presentational style writing.

Historias was described by Dragún as "studies in the grotesque," and therefore focused heavily on the dehumanization process which he called "animalizacion." Historia de hombre que se convirtio en perro is unique in comparison to the style of the other Historia's because of its emphasis on the devaluation of language, a common theme in Theatre of the Absurd. It also follows the narrative foregrounding technique more than other Historias, like "Historia de como nuestro amigo Panchito Gonzalez se sintio responsible de la epidemia de peste bubonica en Africa del Sur," which does not have the actors narrate or recreate the story at all.

The characters in The Story of the Man Who Turned into a Dog play multiple roles and are not fully developed, making the audience focus on the situations of the characters rather than the characters themselves.

== Production history ==
- Originated by Teatro Popular Fray Mocho in 1957 as a part of the Stories to be Told series with an adaptation introducing characters from Commedia dell'arte written by Osvaldo Dragún himself.
- Presented by Talento Bilingüe de Houston, a Chicano theatre company at the 1976 ATA Convention.
- Presented by Artists and Resources Inc. in 1987.
- Presented by The Latino Arts Theater in 2006.

== Context ==
=== Osvaldo Dragún ===
Dragún was born on May 7, 1929, in Entre Ríos Province of Argentina to a Jewish family. His father was a horse tamer, who lost his job following an economic crash. This event severely impacted the family, forcing the family to move to Buenos Aires and inspiring Dragún to draw heavy influence from this while writing Historia de hombre que se convirtio en perro. Dragún is also known for his writing for film and television, as a result of his project "Teatro Abierto" that took place during a period of military repression. He died in June 1999 as one of Argentina's prominent playwrights, having won two Casa de las Américas Prizes for his writing and contribution to the theatre.

Most of Dragún's plays focus on the life of a lower or middle social class, often criticizing a capitalist society that represses them.

=== Argentine Teatro independiente movement ===
Osvaldo Dragún was particularly involved in the Argentine Teatro independiente (independent theatre) movement, a predecessor to Argentine Open Theatre in the 1980s. Argentine Teatro independiente began in the 1930s with the establishment of Teatro del Pueblo, founded by the poet Leónidas Barletta. When the movement began, it drew heavy influence from the European avant-garde movement, as apparent in Dragún's heavily Brechtian writing style. In addition to avant-garde style and technique, the Teatro independiente movement also encouraged the use of the 'system' of Konstantin Stanislavski.

The goal of Argentine Teatro independiente was to provide a platform to engage with theatre written by the best authors in Argentina. It counteracted the popular commercial and national theaters, and often criticized capitalism and commercialism. The values and aesthetic of the movement were incredibly strong because most companies shared designers, playwrights, directors and actors. Because of its fringe-like values, many of the theatre companies were housed in basements, lofts and other non-conventional spaces. Of the most prominent independent theatre companies were Teatro del Pueblo, La Mascara, Nuevo Teatro and Fray Mocho, the theatre company where Historia del hombre que se convirtió en perro premiered.

Teatro independiente had great influence on the theatre of its surrounding countries, including Peru, Chile, Bolivia, and Uruguay. By 1956, the movement had died out, following the collapse of the Juan Perón political regime.
