= Gorostiza =

Gorostiza is a Basque surname meaning 'place of hollies' or 'abundance of hollies' (Ilex aquifolium) .

== People ==
- José Gorostiza (1901–1973), Mexican poet, educator, and diplomat
- Celestino Gorostiza (1904–1967), Mexican playwright and dramatist
- Guillermo Gorostiza (1909–1966), Spanish footballer
- Carlos Gorostiza (1920–2016), Argentine playwright, theatre director and novelist
- Anndrew Blythe Daguio Gorostiza (born 2003), Filipina actress, model, and recording artist
- Ismael Gorostiza, Spanish architect
