= Jorge Rivera López =

Argentinian actor (1930–2024)

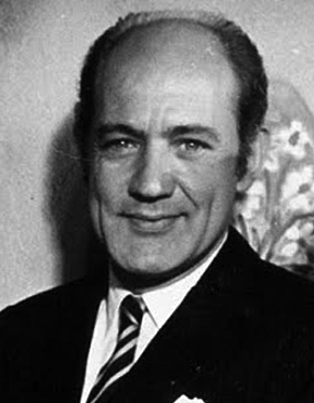
- Rivera López in 1974
- Born: 19 March 1930; Buenos Aires, Argentina
- Died: 5 September 2024 (aged 94)
- Occupation: Actor
- Years active: 1958–2024
- Spouse: María Elina Rúas (?–2016)
- Children: 2

Jorge Rivera López (19 March 1930 – 5 September 2024) was an Argentine television and film actor.

== Life and career ==
Jorge Rivera López was born on 19 March 1930. During the 1980s military dictatorship, López, along with Luis Brandoni, Roberto Cossa, Osvaldo Dragún, and Pepe Soriano, accompanied by Nobel Peace Prize winner (1980) Adolfo Esquivel and writer Ernesto Sábato, formed a group called Teatro Abierto (Open Theater) in an attempt to reinvent independent theater separated from government propaganda and approval. Despite threats, they opened with the declaration that they were against dictatorship and government intervention in the arts. On the opening night, Rivera López read the “Declaration of the Principles” claiming for all the participants their right to freedom of opinion and expression. Three works per day were presented for a full week in the Tabaris Theatre, to an estimated audience of 25,000. The movement continued to perform, despite government disapproval, until the return to democracy and, for several years afterwards, presented works critical of the abuses of the dictatorship. Rivera López died on 5 September 2024, at the age of 90.

== Works ==
=== Theater ===
- ¡Ay Carmela! (1989)

=== Film ===
- Pobres habrá siempre (1958) – Eduardo Sandoval
- Tres veces Ana (1961)
- Los jóvenes viejos (1962)
- Los inconstantes (1963)
- Pajarito Gómez -una vida feliz- (1965)
- Gente conmigo (1965)
- Extraña invasión (1965)
- ¡Ufa con el sexo! (inédita) (1968)
- Turismo de carretera (1968)
- La fiaca (1969)
- Kuma Ching (1969) – Sansón
- Todos los pecados del mundo (1972)
- La malavida (1973) – Simón Linsky
- La Patagonia rebelde (1974) – Edward Mathews
- La Mary (1974) – Ariel
- Triángulo de cuatro (1975)
- Más allá del sol (1975)
- La Hora de María y el pájaro de oro (1975)
- Difunta Correa (1975)
- Proceso a la infamia (1978) – Senador Santana
- Visión de un asesino (no estrenada comercialmente) (1981)
- Made in Argentina (1987)
- Negra medianoche, inédita, (1990)
- Of Love and Shadows (1994)
- De amor y de sombra (1995) – Professor Leal
- Veredicto final, (1996)
- Momentos robados, (1997)
- Cómplices (1998) – Fernando
- Apariencias (2000) – Esteban Ortiz
- Claim (2002) – Juan Pasaron
- El borde del tiempo (2004) – Vincente
- Incorregibles, (2007)

=== Television ===
- Historia de jóvenes (Series TV), 1959
- El ABC del amor (episode "Noche terrible") (1967) – Ricardo
- Esta noche... miedo (Series TV), 1970
- La única noche (Series TV), 1985
- La elegida (Agustín-Series TV), 1992
- Micaela (Antonio-Series TV), 1992
- Chiquititas (Ramiro Morán-Series TV), 1995
- La mujer del presidente (Series TV), 1999
- Don Juan y Su Bella Dama (Francisco-Series TV), 2008
- El elegido (Tomás-Series TV), 2011
