= Lito Cruz =

Argentine stage director and actor

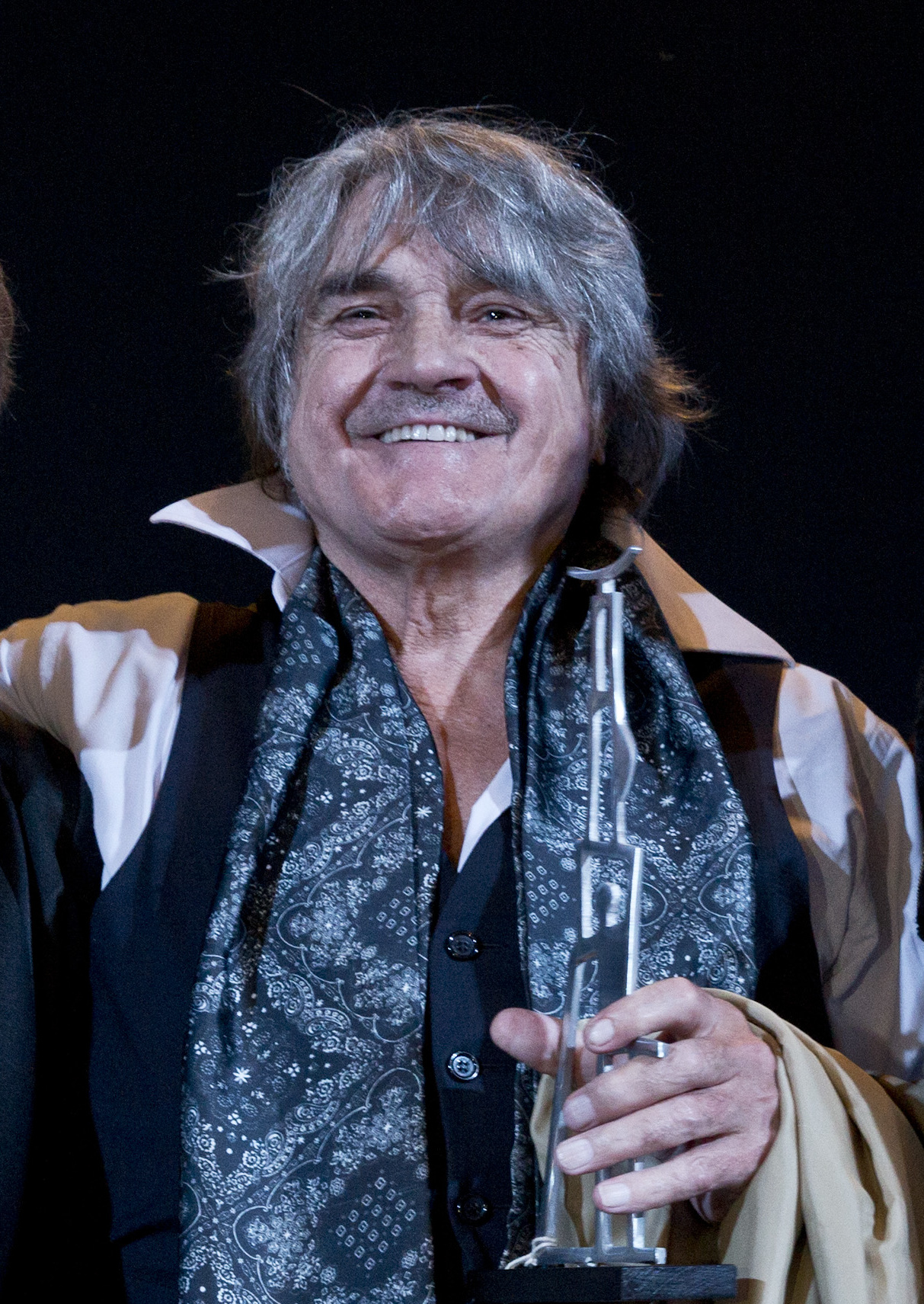
- Born: Oscar Alberto Cruz; May 14, 1941; Berisso, Argentina
- Died: December 19, 2017 (aged 76); Buenos Aires, Argentina
- Education: University of Buenos Aires; University Theatre Institute of Chile
- Occupations: Argentine cinema and theatre actor, director, and playwright
- Awards: Martín Fierro Awards (2011, 2014)
- Website: www.litocruz.com.ar

Lito Cruz (May 14, 1941 – December 19, 2017) was a prominent Argentine stage director and motion picture actor.

== Life and work ==
Lito was born Oscar Alberto Cruz in the working-class La Plata suburb of Berisso in 1941, and began performing in local theatres at the age of 15. Graduating from a La Plata secondary school, he continued to pursue his calling in La Plata's growing independent theatre scene.

Enrolling at the University of Buenos Aires School of Architecture and Urbanism in 1961, he made time for performances throughout his studies. Following his 1964 graduation, he enrolled at the prestigious University Theatre Institute of Chile (ITUCH) and returned to Buenos Aires in 1968. He was cast by Argentine playwright Roberto Cossa in a short film adaptation of his Los taitas ("The Uncles") and the following year, co-founded the Experimental Theatre Team of Buenos Aires (ETEBA) with Augusto Fernándes. ETEBA produced an adaptation of Henrik Ibsen's Peer Gynt, La leyenda de Pedro, which was well received and earned Cruz international esteem following its tour through festivals at Nancy, Berlin and Florence. ETEBA was invited to perform their El sapo y la serpiente ("The Toad and the Serpent") at the Munich Olympics in 1972.

Cruz was Professor of Acting at the National Drama Conservatory between 1972 and 1975, where he directed Peter Handke's The Ward Wants to be Warden among other avant-garde works. This experience earned him a U.S. Department of State scholarship to attend Lee Strasberg's prestigious Actors Studio in New York and a fellowship with the Gulbenkian Foundation of Portugal to attend the University of Porto's Drama School. Returning to Buenos Aires, he continued to direct his experimental theatre school, which became one of Argentina's most coveted drama schools. His production of Eduardo Pavlovsky's politically charged El Señor Galíndez led to the bombing of the Payró Theatre by the fascist commando group, the Argentine Anticommunist Alliance.

Having been given a number of supporting film roles since his appearance in Los taitas, Cruz was cast as the happy-go-lucky ghost of an assassinated stockyards worker in Fernando Solanas' Sur (1987), a chronicle of the lives of a working-class southside borough in Buenos Aires during Argentina's brutal last dictatorship. He devoted himself to his drama school, however, accepting only brief supporting roles in film until, in 1996, he was cast in Mario Levin's Sotto voce ("Whispers") as Walensky, a gruff southside bar owner embroiled in intrigue.

Lito Cruz increased his prominence as an advocate for theatre in Argentina during the 1990s, which had been the victim of intimidation during the 1970s and financial woes, since. He was named director of the Argentine Actors' Association and "Action for Culture, Theatre and Visual Arts," a leading advocacy group for its field in Argentina. This work led to his appointment as National Theatres Director in 1995, a position he leveraged to help have Congress pass the "National Theatre Law" in 1998. The bill helped protect struggling stages against demolition and guaranteed annual subsidies for the art.

Lito Cruz continued his work as head of the drama school that now bears his name, while having accepted more starring roles in film. Some of the most notable have been that of a retired military officer guarding a family secret in Fito Páez's Vidas privadas (a 2001 drama that helped secure Mexican star Gael García Bernal's prominence in cinema) and as an aging intellectual facing a crossroads in life in Mario Sábato's India Pravile (2003), among others. He continues his work as an advocate for his art in government, as well, as Director of the Province of Buenos Aires Comedy and the Coliseo Podestá Theatre in La Plata.

Cruz created and produced Sueños de milongueros in 2009, a musical written in homage to authors Jorge Luis Borges and Alejandro Dolina, and cartoonist/satirist Roberto Fontanarrosa.

== Death ==
Cruz died due to a heart attack on December 19, 2017, at his home in Barrio Norte, Buenos Aires.

== Awards ==
- Martín Fierro Awards

2011. Best Supporting Actor, El elegido
2014. Best Supporting Actor, Solamente vos
