= Los afincaos =

Los Afincaos
- Directed by: Leónidas Barletta
- Written by: Enzo Aloisi; Bernardo González Arrilli
- Produced by: Leónidas Barletta
- Starring: José Álvarez; Catalina Asta
- Cinematography: Mario Pagés
- Edited by: Ulrico Stern
- Music by: Jacobo Ficher
- Distributed by: Teatro del Pueblo
- Release date: 28 October 1941
- Running time: 95 minutes
- Country: Argentina
- Language: Spanish

Los Afincaos (English language: Sons of the Earth) is a 1941 Argentine western melodrama film of the Golden Age of Argentine cinema, directed by Leónidas Barletta and written by Enzo Aloisi.

== Overview ==
Los Afincaos (Sons of the Earth) was the first film ever produced by the major Argentine film company Teatro del Pueblo. Set in the Northern hills, the story concerns a pair of Indian brothers, leaders of their local tribe. The older of the brothers falls in love with a young school teacher, but rather than go through the courtship proceedings, he kidnaps and rapes the unfortunate girl. When she dies from grief, the younger brother avenges her death by killing his sibling. The acting and staging of Los Afincaos reveal a great deal about the lack of experience at such an early stage in Argentine feature film history.

== Cast ==
- José Álvarez
- Catalina Asta
- Remo Asta
- Juan Carlos Bettini
- Celia Eresky
- Juan Eresky
- Rosa Eresky
- Mari Galimberti
- Mario Genovesi
- Josefa Goldar
- Fernando Guerra
- Oscar Gutiérrez
- Roberto Leydet
- Emilio Lommi
- Mecha Martínez
- Olga Mosin
- Pascual Nacarati
- José Petriz
- Nélida Piuselli
- Marister Uslenghi
- José Veneziani

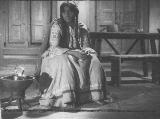
Catalina Asta (pictured) is kidnapped and held hostage by a jealous brother

== Release ==
The film premiered on 28 October 1941 in Buenos Aires.
