= Grupo renovación =

Argentine composers' association (1929–1944)

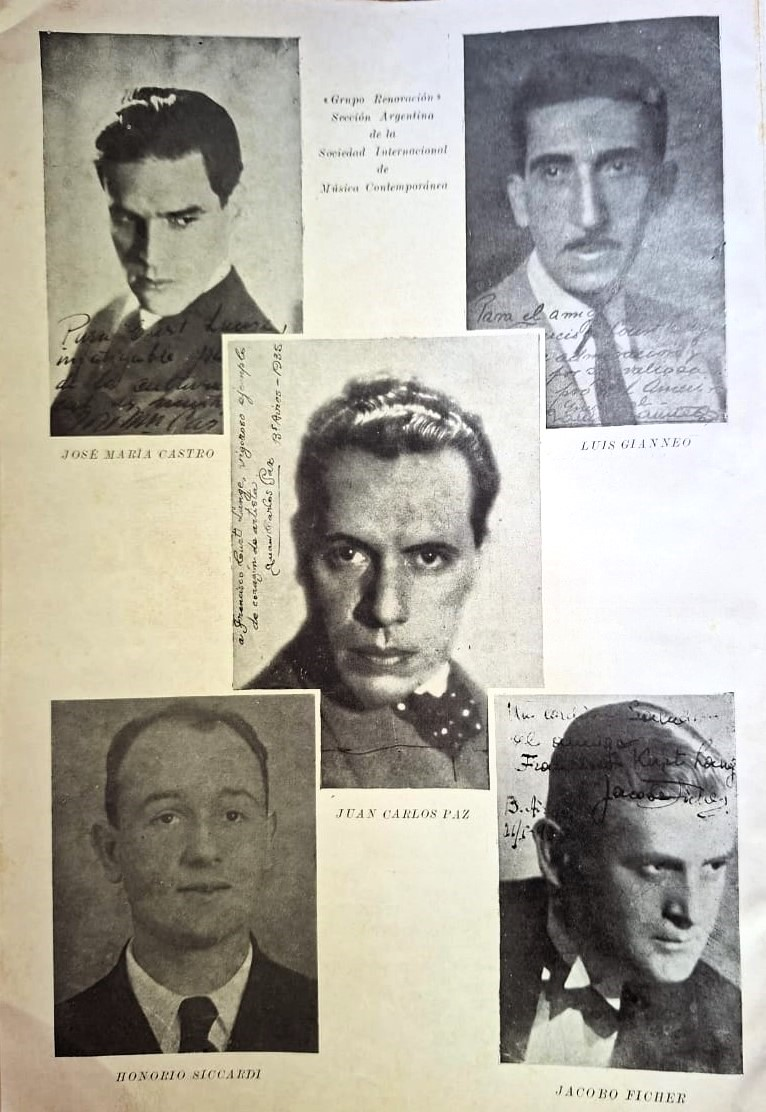
Portraits of members of Grupo Renovación (Argentine section of the ISCM), published in the Boletín Latino-Americano de Música, vol. I, year I (1935).

The Grupo Renovación was an Argentine composers' association founded in 1929 to promote modern music.

The Grupo Renovación was founded on 22 October 1929. The aims of the group were "to discuss compositions of its members; to perform and to publish their best works; to arrange performances of native music abroad; and to discuss publicly the general subject of music, with the intention of contribution to the progress of musical culture". The founding members were the older two Castro brothers (José María and Juan José), Gilardo Gilardi, Juan Carlos Paz, and Jacobo Ficher, a naturalized Russian. The third Castro brother, Washington, joined at some later date. In 1932, Juan José Castro and Gilardi left the group and Honorio Siccardi and Luis Gianneo joined. Gianneo remained until 1944. In 1936 Paz left the group to found his own series of concerts, Conciertos de la Nueva Música. Siccardi then replaced him as secretary of the group.. Alfredo Pinto was briefly a member of the group in 1935. The organization eventually joined the International Society for Contemporary Music (ISCM) and became the Argentine section of the society.

According to the group’s founding manifesto (21 September 1929), Grupo Renovación was established with the following objectives:

- to encourage the artistic improvement of each member through critical knowledge and examination of their works;
- to promote the dissemination and public performance of these works;
- to publish the compositions of its affiliates;
- to extend abroad the diffusion of the group’s musical production;
- to give special attention to the country’s general musical output and facilitate its recognition through available means;
- to foster public discussion on artistic matters, insofar as this may contribute to the development and consolidation of musical culture.

The Grupo renovación presented concerts in the large hall of the Teatro del Pueblo in Buenos Aires, which was managed by a cooperative theatrical company specializing in modern drama. They provided the hall at the lowest possible cost, enabling the group to keep the price of admission to just half a peso. In the mid-1940s, the Grupo renovación gave as many as fifteen concerts a year, in a season lasting through the winter from March to November.
