= Carlos Gorostiza =

Argentine author and playwright (1920–2016)

Carlos Gorostiza Rodríguez
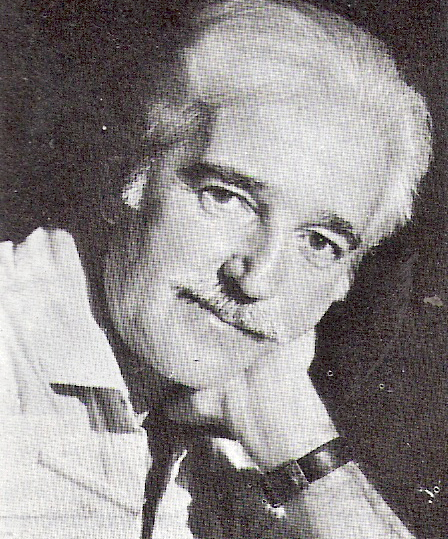
- Born: June 7, 1920; Buenos Aires, Argentina
- Died: July 19, 2016 (aged 96); Buenos Aires, Argentina
- Occupations: Playwright, theatre director, novelist
- Writing career
- Years active: 1943–2016

Carlos Gorostiza Rodríguez (Spanish pronunciation: [ˈkaɾlos ɣoɾosˈtisa roˈðɾiɣes]; June 7, 1920 – July 19, 2016) was an Argentine playwright, theatre director, and novelist. His seminal work El puente debuted in 1949 and he garnered numerous awards for his proceeding works. He later was Secretary of Culture between 1983-86.

== Early life ==
Carlos Gorostiza Rodríguez was born to Basque Argentine parents in the upscale Buenos Aires borough of Palermo. He and an older brother enjoyed a happy early childhood until, in 1926, their father, Fermín Gorostiza (among the first Argentines to receive a pilot's licence) abandoned the family.

His mother took up employment with a clothing designer, and her two sons, who entered the labour force as children, gradually recovered from the setback. In 1931, she remarried and had a daughter, María Esther, who went on to become a moderately successful actress under the pseudonym Analía Gadé.

== Career ==
Gorostiza's Spanish-born stepfather, a playwright, introduced Carlos to the theatre. In 1943, he debuted his first work, a puppet show, La clave encantada (The enchanted key). The show's success allowed him to open a puppet theatre, La Estrella Grande. He began frequenting the Máscara Theatre, where he began a successful run as Creon in their productions of the classic Greek tragedy, Antigone. Encouraged by friends, he presented his first play at the Máscara Theatre in 1949, El puente (The Bridge).

Capturing the tension between different social classes in Buenos Aires, the realist El puente drew partly on his own childhood experiences with his mother's fallen social status and secured his reputation in Buenos Aires. Produced in a professional version by director Armando Discépolo at the prestigious Argentine Theatre, El puente was adapted into a film version, which Gorostiza directed in 1950.

Following El puente's success, Gorostiza returned to theatre direction, though without the draw of spectators he had earlier enjoyed. Turning to work as a publicist for an ad agency whose chief customer was a laundry soap maker, his fame returned somewhat as a screenwriter for Julio Saraceni's drama Marta Ferrari (1954) and when his play El pan de la locura (The bread of madness) was produced at Buenos Aires' famed Cervantes Theatre to acclaim in 1958. The tragedy won him the coveted Municipal Prize, an award that earned him an invitation to the Central University of Venezuela Drama School in 1960, where he taught and co-wrote Los Caobos (The mahogany trees) with Juana Sujo. Returning to Argentina in 1964, he continued his academic experience as professor of drama at the University of Buenos Aires. In 1966, he writes and stages the play The neighbors, based on the Kitty Genovese murder from the perspective of the inactive spectators of the near buildings.

Devoting himself mostly to teaching, Gorostiza produced only two new plays in the next decade. A novel published early in 1976 (Los cuartos oscuros – The voting booths) yielded him a National Grand Prize for Literature. This, his first novel, coincided with the military coup that would usher in the most brutal Argentine dictatorship of the 20th century; shortly thereafter, Gorostiza lost his tenure at the University of Buenos Aires. Cautious but undeterred, Gorostiza published a second novel, Los hermanos queridos (Dear brothers), in 1978. A subtle criticism of the era's climate of fear, it earned him another Municipal Grand Prize and National Grand Prize.

A certain loosening of censorship in 1980 led his fellow playwright Osvaldo Dragún to form a partnership with Gorostiza, writer Roberto Cossa, actor Pepe Soriano and others in an Argentine Open Theatre in the hope of encouraging a further return of the freedom of expression whose absence had led so many other cultural figures to leave Argentina since 1975. Converting a shuttered spark plug factory in the Balvanera district of Buenos Aires to the Picadero Theatre, they premiered a festival of their collective new works (including Gorostiza's El acompañamiento – The entourage) to acclaim on July 28, 1981. This success was marred by the theatre's fire bombing a week later, still an "unsolved mystery" (the Picadero reopened in 2001).

The return to democracy imminently following the Falklands War and economic collapse at the hand of the dictators' economists, Gorostiza produced Killing Time and A Fire to Put Out in 1982, plays which earned him an Argentores Prize.

== Foray into politics ==
Elections called for October 1983 drew Gorostiza to a progressive UCR candidate, Raúl Alfonsín. Facing a close contest with Peronist candidate Ítalo Lúder and with elections but three months away, the UCR nominee was given a simple slogan by the former publicist: the alliterative Ahora, Alfonsín! Facing a harried timetable and with his candidate unable to break out in the polls, Gorostiza was struck by President Reynaldo Bignone's snide dismissal of the historic elections as a "democratic way out," whereby he created ads appealing for votes for "more than a democratic way out...a way into life." Alfonsín won the 1983 election by a surprising 12-point margin, carrying majorities in Lower House of Congress.

Appointed Secretary of Culture by President Alfonsín upon taking office on December 10, he rescinded the National Film Rating Entity and devoted his time to the post, helping encourage a strong recovery in the theatre and cinema of Argentina amid continuing economic malaise and budgetary scarcity. Frustrated by the post's limitations, he resigned amicably in 1986. He was replaced by Marcos Aguinis.

== Later work ==
Gorostiza returned to writing, publishing a novella, collaborating on an acclaimed 1989 documentary of the Open Theatre and penning a nostalgic look at his brief time with his barnstorming natural father, Aeroplanos, which won him another Argentores Prize. Turning increasingly to the past, his sentimental 1994 play Rear Patio and 1999 historical novel Vuelan las Palomas (Pigeons fly) were less-well received, though Gorostiza retained his loyal following. His existentialist 2001 novel Good People was followed in 2004 by another tale of his own childhood curiosity, The Masked Marauder. Gorostiza debuted his long-awaited El alma de papá (Dad's soul) in 2008. Starring Open Theatre colleague Jorge Rivera López in the title role, it continues Gorostiza's distinction as the dean of Argentine realist playwrights.

His works continued to be shown into his 90s, with four in rotation on the Buenos Aires theatre circuit in 2015. He died at the age of 96 in Buenos Aires on 19 July 2016. A vigil was held in the Teatro Nacional Cervantes.

== Plays ==
- La clave encantada, 1943
- El puente, 1949
- El pan de la locura, 1958
- Vivir aquí, teatro, 1964
- Los prójimos, 1966
- ¿A qué jugamos? 1968
- El lugar, 1970
- Los hermanos queridos, 1978
- El acompañamiento, 1981
- Matar el tiempo, 1982
- Hay que apagar el fuego, 1982
- Aeroplanos, 1990

== Novels ==
- “Los Cuartos Oscuros” – 1976
- “Cuerpos Presentes” - 1981
- “El Basural”- 1988
- “La buena gente” - 2001
- “La tierra inquieta” - 2008
