= Hilda Dianda =

Argentinian composer and musicologist (1925–2014)

- Born: Hilda Fanny Dianda; 13 April 1925; Córdoba, Argentina
- Died: 7 August 2014 (aged 89); Buenos Aires, Argentina
- Occupations: Composer, musicologist, music educator, conductor

Hilda Fanny Dianda (13 April 1925 – 7 August 2014) was an Argentinian composer, musicologist, music educator and conductor.

== Early life ==
Hilda Dianda was born in Córdoba, Argentina on 13 April 1925. She began her musical studies in Buenos Aires from 1942 to 1950 under Honorio Siccardi. She was awarded a fellowship, and began studying conducting under Hermann Scherchen in Venice from 1949 to 1950. She later moved to France where she was influenced by the "Musical Research Group" (GRMC) of French radio, directed by Pierre Schaeffer. She was invited into a phonology research position with Radio Audizioni Italiane (RAI) along with John Cage, Henri Pousseur, Dieter Schönbach, and André Boucourechliev, where she also began to study electronic music in the Studio di Fonologia, Milan. These studies earned her a fellowship and a Medal of Cultural Merit from the Kranichstein Music Institute. From 1960 to 1962 she participated in the International Courses of New Music in Darmstadt, Germany.

== Career ==
In 1966 she worked in the Electronic Music Lab at the California State University, Northridge in the United States. From 1967 to 1971 she returned to Argentina as a professor of composition, orchestration, technical, and orchestral conducting at the School of Arts of the Universidad Nacional de Córdoba, Argentina after which she moved to Germany until 1976. She toured Latin America and Europe as a conductor. As a musicologist, Dianda published professional articles on contemporary music in a number of journals and magazines as well as her book La Música Argentina de Hoy in 1966. After a seven year break from composing, Dianda wrote The Requiem in 1984 dedicated to "our dead" and utilizing ancient Latin texts.

== Death ==
Dianda died in Buenos Aires on 7 August 2014, at the age of 89.

== Honors and awards ==
- 1964 Medal of Cultural Merit, Italy
- 1980 Caballero en la Orden de las Palmas Académicas, France
- Official Recognition by Fundatión Alicia Moreau de Justo, Argentina

== Works ==
Dianda composed for orchestra, chamber ensemble and electronic production. Selected works include:

Title	Date	Instrumentation
Obertura para titeres	1948	Orchestra
Tarde, La	1949	Voice and piano
Musica para arcos	1951	String orchestra
Trio	1953	Flute, oboe, and bassoon
Three sonatas	1956	Piano
Dos Estudios en Oposición	1959	Tape
Estructuras I-III	1960	Cello and piano
Diedros	1962	Flute
Canciones	1962	Soprano, guitar, vibraphone, and percussion
Rituales	1962	Voice, percussion or piano and percussion
Núcleos	1963	Orchestra
Qt III	1963	Strings
Percusión 11	1963	11 percussion
Resonancias-1	1964	5 horns
Ludus-1	1965	Cello and orchestra
A-7	1966	Cello and magnetic tape
Resonancias 5	1966-68	Choruses
Ludus 2	1968	Chamber orchestra
Divertimento	1969-70	6 percussion
Impromptu	1970	String Orchestra
Canto	1972	Chamber Orchestra
Celebraciones	1974	Cello and Percussion
Oda	1974	2 trumpet, 3 trombone, and 3 percussion
Después el Silencio	1976	Tape
Requiem	1984	Chorus and orchestra
Encantamientos	1984	Tape
Trío	1985	Clarinet, Cello, and Piano
Cadencias	1985	Woodwinds and percussion
Cadencias 2	1986	Violin and piano
Cántico	1988	Chorus and chamber orchestra
Va Conc.	1988	Orchestra
Paisaje	1992	Chamber orchestra
Mitos	1993	Percussion and Strings
Rituales	1994	Marimba
