= Marta Lambertini =

Argentine composer (1937–2019)

Marta Lambertini (13 November 1937 – 25 March 2019) was an Argentine composer.

== Biography ==
She was born in San Isidro, Buenos Aires, and studied at the Universidad Catolica Argentina with Roberto Caamano, Luis Gianneo and Gerardo Gandini, graduating in 1972. She continued her studies in electroacoustic music in Buenos Aires, at the Centro de Investigationes de la Ciudad with Francisco Kröpfl, Gerardo Gandini, José Maranzano and Gabriel Brncic.

After completing her studies, Lambertini taught music at the Conservatorio Nacional Superior de Música and the National University of La Plata, before taking a position as dean of the Faculty of Music Arts and Sciences of the Catholic University of Argentina.

She received several prizes, including the 1st Prize in the National Music Award, the City of Buenos Aires Music Prize, Career Prize APA in 1972 and 1975, and the Konex Award (1999). She served as a jury member in international composition competitions in Brazil and Argentina. She is the author of the book "Gerardo Gandini, music fiction". She was nominated for Opera Theatres of the World for her opera "Cinderella", and for the Clarín Award as the most important figure in classical music in Argentina. Her output includes diverse instrumental and vocal genres. Her operas "Alice in Wonderland" (1989), "S.M.R. Bach" (1990), "Hildegard" (2002), "Cinderella" (2006) and multiple symphonic and chamber works are worth mentioning.

== Works ==
Selected works include:

- Quasares for string quartet, 1971
- Galileo descubre las cuatro lunas de Jupiter, for orchestra, 1984
- Alice in Wonderland (Alice Through the Looking-Glass), opera, 1989
- ¡Oh, Eternidad...! Ossia S.M.R. Bach, opera, 1990
- Última filmación de los anillos de Saturno, for four clarinets, 1991
- Hildegard (Mujeres), opera, 2002
- ¡Cenicientaaa..! (Cinderella), opera, 2008
- Humpty Dumpty for solo clarinet, 2009
