= Grandma (1979 film) =

- DVD film poster
- Spanish: La Nona
- Directed by: Héctor Olivera
- Screenplay by: Roberto Cossa; Héctor Olivera
- Based on: La nona by Roberto Cossa
- Produced by: Fernando Ayala
- Starring: Pepe Soriano; Juan Carlos Altavista; Osvaldo Terranova; Fernando Iglesias 'Tacholas'
- Cinematography: Victor Hugo Caula
- Edited by: Carlos Piaggio
- Music by: Oscar Cardozo Campo
- Production company: Aries Cinematográfica Argentina
- Distributed by: Aries Cinematográfica Argentina
- Release date: May 10, 1979
- Running time: 90 minutes
- Country: Argentina
- Language: Spanish

Grandma (Spanish: La Nona) is a 1979 Argentine comedy drama film directed by Héctor Olivera and starring Pepe Soriano, Juan Carlos Altavista and Osvaldo Terranova.

== Synopsis ==
A poor Argentine family of Italian origin lives with their grandmother Carmen, known by all as "La Nona" (grandma in Italian). Despite her advanced age, La Nona eats nonstop, while the family struggles with the bills and feeding at the same time. La Nona brings the family to the edge of ruin, whose members begin to look for the most diverse ways to earn money and eventually get rid of the old woman.

== Cast ==
- Pepe Soriano as Carmen Racazzi, la Nona
- Juan Carlos Altavista as Chicho Spadone
- Osvaldo Terranova as Carmelo Spadone
- Eva Franco as Anyula Spadone
- Nya Quesada as María Spadone
- Graciela Alfano as Marta "Martita" Spadone
- Guillermo Battaglia as Don Francisco
- Nelly Tesolín as Severe Nun
- Oscar Nuñez as Luque
- Pedro Martínez as Vicente
- Vicente La Russa as Poroto
- Amanda Beitia as Friendly Nun
- Aldo Bigatti as Candy store owner
- Tacholas as Old man in asylum
- Horacio O'Connor as Anthropologist
- Coco Fossati as Street vendor
- Marta Roldán as Mother Superior
- Max Berliner as Old man 2º
- Cayetano Biondo as Old man 3º
- Roberto Dairiens as Grocer
- Emilio Vidal as Baker
- Tony Middleton as Doctor
- Alfredo Quesada as Radiologist
- Gustavo Segal as Fishmonger
- Anita Bobazo as Old lady 1º
- Remedios Climent as Old lady 2º
- Pablo Nápoli as Police officer
- Héctor Ugazio as Old man 4º
- Horacio Guisado as Ophthalmologist
- Walter Korwell as Doorman at the Museum
- Raquel Oquendo as Old lady 3º
- Aurora Peris as Old lady 4º
- Miguel Angel Martinez as Cook at the asylum
- Mario Kohut as Old man 5º
- Fernando Ayala as Justice of the peace
- Eduardo Santibanez as Fishmonger 2º
- Roberto Tarsitani as Pimp

== BBC Version ==
A made for TV version was produced in 1991 for the BBC Network, starring comic Les Dawson, as part of the Performance series.

=== BBC Cast ===
- Les Dawson
- Liz Smith
- Jim Broadbent
- Timothy Spall
- Sue Brown
- Jane Horrocks
- Maurice Denham
