= Pepe Soriano =

Argentine actor, director and playwright (1929–2023)

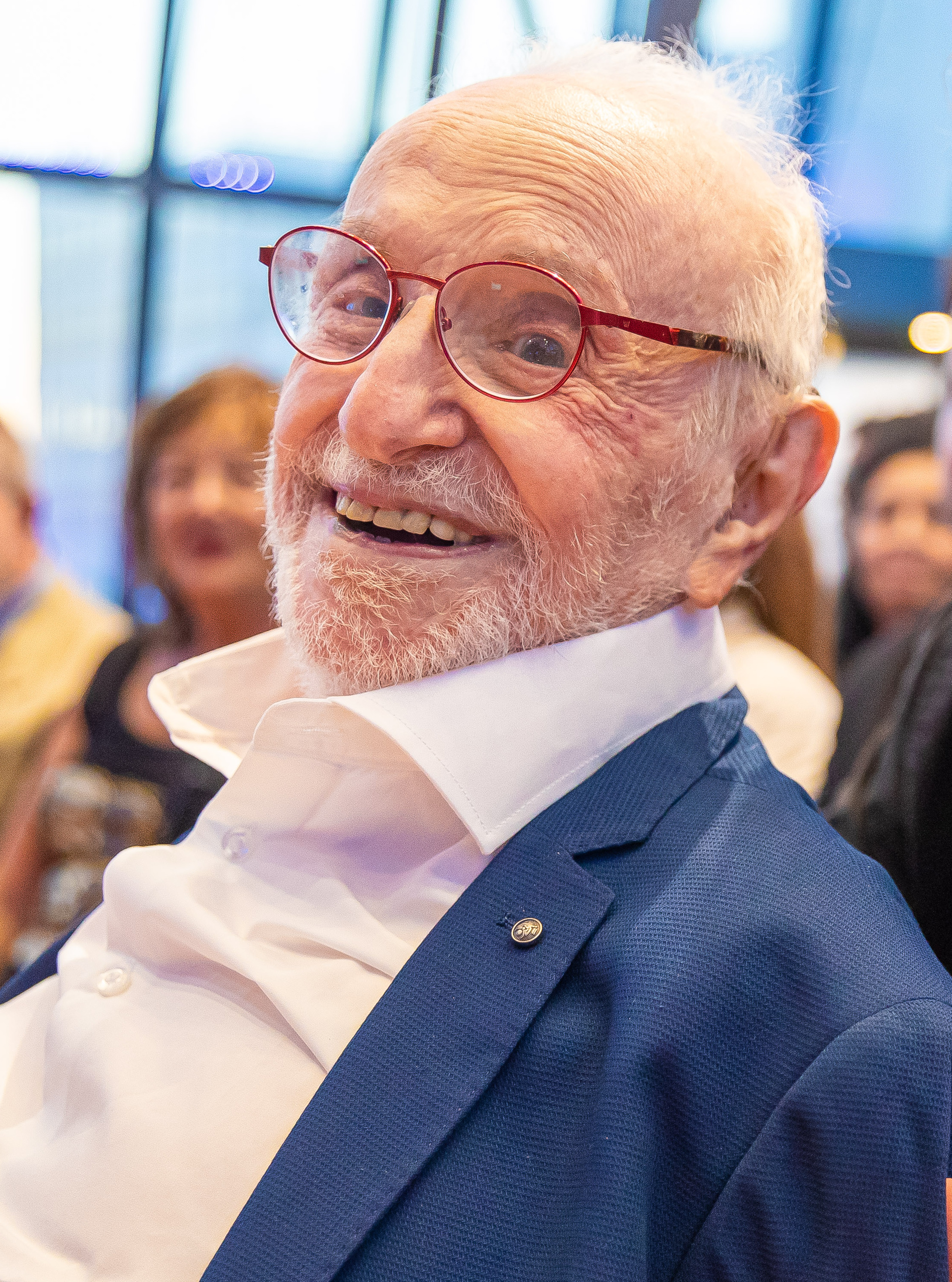
- Soriano in 2023
- Born: José Carlos Soriano; 25 September 1929; Buenos Aires, Argentina
- Died: 13 September 2023 (aged 93); Buenos Aires, Argentina
- Other name: Pepe Soriano
- Education: University of Buenos Aires
- Occupations: Actor; Director; playwright
- Years active: 1953–2011

José Carlos "Pepe" Soriano (25 September 1929 – 13 September 2023) was an Argentine actor, director, and playwright.

== Early life ==
Soriano was born and raised in Buenos Aires, Argentina. Enrolling at the University of Buenos Aires Law School, he entered one of the university's theatre groups and, leaving law school to devote himself to the theatre, he produced his first work, El chaleco encantado ("The Enchanted Sweater") in 1950, among four other works he completed and staged while in school. Soriano debuted professionally in a production of A Midsummernight's Dream at the Colón Theatre, in 1953.

Debuting in television in 1954, Soriano starred in leading roles in Argentine premieres of Paddy Chayefsky's The Tenth Man, Marcel Achard's Voulez-vous jouer avec moi? ("Would You Like to Play with Me?"), Eugene O'Neill's Ah, Wilderness! and Carlos Gorostiza's adaptation of Ryūnosuke Akutagawa's Rashomon. These performances earned Soriano the "Martin Fierro" and "Cóndor del Plata" Prizes in 1964. Having accepted occasional supporting roles in Argentine cinema, he was cast as the lead in Juan José Jusid's production of Roberto Cossa's tragedy, Eeny, Meeny, Miny, Mo (Tute Cabrero) (1968) and in Raúl de la Torre's character study, Juan Lamaglia y Sra. ("Mr. and Mrs. Juan Lamaglia", 1970).

== Career ==
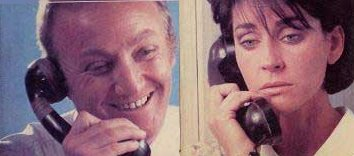
Opposite Julia von Grolman in Mr. and Mrs. Juan Lamaglia (1970).

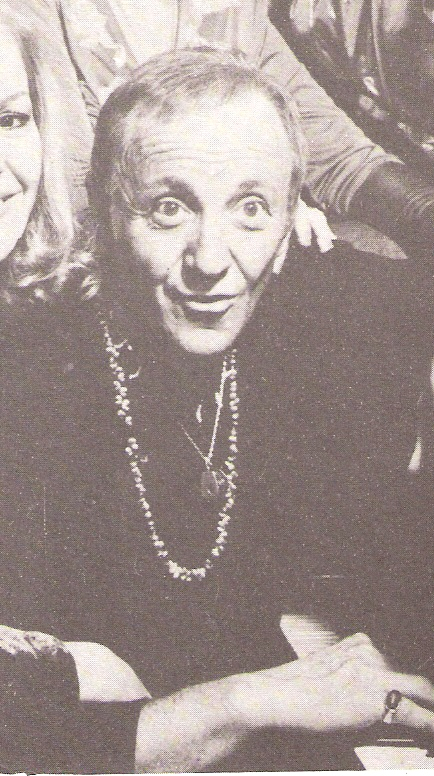
Soriano and friends, 1980.

Soriano appeared in a number of historical dramas during the turbulent 1970s. Given the title role in David Viñas' play, Lisandro (1971), he received plaudits for his portrayal of Senator Lisandro de la Torre, a fiery muck-raker remembered for his opposition to the excessive influence landowners exercised over conservative governments in the 1930s. Following a return to democracy in 1973, Soriano was cast as Schultz, a German anarchist works as a ranch hand, in Osvaldo Bayer's La Patagonia rebelde ("Rebellion in Patagonia", 1974). The portrayal of the brutal repression of a 1922 sheep ranch workers' strike was made with the assistance of the progressive new Governor of Santa Cruz Province, Jorge Cepernic, and resulted in serious problems for both Cepernic and many of those involved in the film - including Soriano, who left for Spain in 1977.

Anxious to improve their tarnished international image, the new military regime enlisted the relatively moderate General Roberto Viola to persuade exiled artists to return, which some, including Soriano, did. He was cast in the title role by Director Héctor Olivera's film version of Roberto Cossa's grotesque play, La nona ("Granma", 1979). The slow pace of liberalization in the dictatorship's policy towards the arts pushed artists led by playwrights Osvaldo Dragún and Carlos Gorostiza to create an Argentine Open Theatre movement in 1980, to which Soriano was one of the first and best-known adherents. Their maiden festival, 28 July 1981, was a success marred by the fire bombing of their Picadero Theatre a week later (an unsolved mystery to this day).

A return to democracy in 1983 allowed Argentine artists to create works critical of the climate of abuses prevalent during the preceding dictatorship and Soriano was cast as the lead in Mercedes Frutos' 1984 film version of Adolfo Bioy Casares' Otra esperanza ("Another Hope"), a horror-fantasy narrative set in a factory where energy is generated from human bodies - a timely metaphor for much of the repression that had targeted industrial workers. Soriano reprised his role of Senator Lisandro de la Torre in Juan José Jusid's Asesinato en el senado de la nación ("An Assassination in the Senate", 1984), a historical drama on the 1935 attempted murder of the reformist senator.

Soriano worked in the theatre less in subsequent years, continuing to accept leading roles in film and on Argentine television. He also starred in Spanish television and was featured for months in Farmacia de guardia ("Night Pharmacy"), among the highest-rated Spanish comedies of the 1990s. His grandfatherly appeal was in demand for Argentine period pieces such as Raúl de la Torre's Funes, un gran amor ("Funes, a Great Love", 1993) and Héctor Olivera's Una sombra ya pronto serás ("A Shadow, You Shall Soon Be", 1994). A similarly bucolic backdrop set the stage for his role as a dying idealist in Diego Arsuaga's El último tren ("The Last Train", 2002), an Uruguayan film indicting unpatriotic business deals. Soriano has also turned to his Jewish roots in theatre works such as Jeff Baron's Visiting Mr. Green, where he teaches an unsympathetic parole officer a lesson in kinship and in cinema such as in the Chilean film, El brindis ("The Toast", 2007), where a Jewish-Chilean patriarch struggles to bring his disparate family closer.

Pepe Soriano died in Buenos Aires on 13 September 2023, at the age of 93.
