= Teatro del Pueblo =

Theatre in Buenos Aires, Argentina

Coordinates: 34.6044°S 58.3798°W

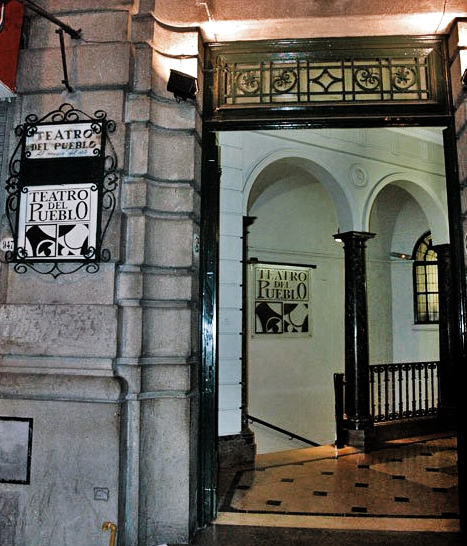
Entrance Hall to the Teatro del Pueblo

The Teatro del Pueblo ("People's Theatre") is the first independent theatre of Latin America, founded in 1930 by playwright Leónidas Barletta in Buenos Aires, Argentina.

== History ==
In 1930, only two months after the Coup d'État against President Hipólito Yrigoyen, which would mark the beginning of the Infamous Decade, a group of left-wing artists decided to create the first independent theatre of Argentina and Latin America.

The project was headed by Leónidas Barletta, who considered that the theatre was not only artistically relevant, but also a tool to resist Fascism. The theatre rapidly became a social space that united actors, writers and painters that were against the dictatorship.

Barletta was inspired by the work of Romain Rolland, whose idea of the new theatre would be centered around workers and common men, different from the Bourgoise men, who attended other theatres less focused in social themes.

The most prominent author who premiered his plays in the Teatro del Pueblo was Roberto Arlt, most famous in Argentina for his novel Los siete locos (The seven madmen). He premiered many plays in the theatre, among them his most famous Trescientos millones (Three Hundred Million) and Saverio, el cruel (Saverio, the cruel one).

In 1975, Barletta died and the Teatro del Pueblo closed its doors. In 1987, a group of actors and directors related to the Open Theatre Movement opened the Theatre again and changed its name to Teatro de la Campana (Theatre of the Bell), as an homage to Barletta, because he used to announce that a play was about to start by ringing a bell.

In 1994 the Theatre was closed again and in 1995 a coop bought the building and donated it to the Playwrights Foundation Carlos Somigliana (SOMI). The building was renovated and the theatre was reinaugurated in 1996, with its original name.

in 2011, the theatre was awarded by the Konex Foundation for its contribution to Argentine Theatre.

== See also ==
- Roberto Arlt
- Florida Group
- Socialism in Argentina
- Theatre of Argentina
