= Jacobo Ficher =

Russian-born Argentine composer (1896–1978)

Jacobo Ficher (Russian: Яков (Хакобо) Фишер, romanized: Yakov (Khakobo) Fisher; 15 January 1896 – 9 September 1978) was a Russian-born Argentine composer, violinist, conductor, and music educator.

== Life ==
Ficher was born in Odessa, in the Russian Empire, to Alexander Ficher, a trombonist in the Odessa Philharmonic Orchestra, and his wife Iente Mirl (Elena) Gotz. He began to study the violin at the age of five, but his lessons were interrupted when his mother died. In 1903 he was able to resume his violin studies with Pyotr Stolyarsky, and later with M. T. Hait. From 1912 to 1917 he was enrolled at the Saint Petersburg Conservatory, where he continued his violin studies with Sergei Korguyev and Leopold Auer. His other teachers included Vasily Kalafati, Maximilian Steinberg, Nikolai Tcherepnin, and Nikolay Sokolov.

On 3 June (Gregorian 16 June) 1920 he married Ana Aronberg, then a piano student at the Odessa Conservatory. The Revolution of 1917 was followed by deteriorating conditions in Odessa and so, in order to escape famine and persecution, the family—including his father with his second wife, his youngest brother Rachmiel (who was a cellist) and a sister-in-law—fled the city, traveling at first to Poland. In 1923 they moved to Argentina, arriving on 10 February, and eventually became citizens of that country. Jacobo and Ana had two children: a son, Miguel, born on 24 June 1923, shortly after their arrival in Buenos Aires, and a daughter, Myra, born 7 February 1928. Ana Aronberg Ficher died on 27 July 1976.

Ficher settled in Buenos Aires, where he was one of the founders in 1929 of the Grupo renovación. Later, in 1947, he was also among the founders of the Argentinian Composers' League.

As an educator, his career began with an appointment in 1943 as professor of Harmony at the Asociación General de Músicos de la Argentina. In 1956 he gained a position teaching composition at the National University of La Plata, where he eventually became professor, and in 1958 he became Professor of Composition at Buenos Aires National Conservatory and Musical Advisor to the Fondo Nacional de las Artes. In 1966 he was appointed Professor of Composition at Buenos Aires Conservatorio Municipal Manuel de Falla, and 1968 he became Professor of Instrumentation at the Teatro Colón's Conservatorio e Instituto. His notable pupils include Emilio Kauderer, Marcelo Koc, Ana Rugeles, Alejandro Viñao, and Ezequiel Viñao.

== Musical style ==
Over the course of a long and prolific career, Ficher employed a variety of styles and techniques, including neoromanticism, neoclassicism, polytonality, twelve-tone technique, serialism, and free atonality, without ever restricting himself to a single methodology. His Jewish heritage is reflected especially in his early works, though the Second Symphony, written in 1933, also uses emotional and rhapsodic Hebrew thematic material, in reaction to news of the Nazi campaign against the Jews in Europe. This aspect also appears in some later works, especially the cantata Kadish, op. 112 (1969), while the Russian tradition is plain in the two Anton Chekhov operas. French Impressionism and the influence of Paul Hindemith are present in the music from the 1920s and 30s, and as late as the slow movement of the Piano Sonata No. 1 of 1941, which is also reminiscent of Charles Koechlin and Darius Milhaud. Later, he turned to Argentine nationalism, stimulated by gauchesco literature in the overture Don Segundo Sombra (1954) (after the novel by Ricardo Güiraldes), popular urban music in Tangos y milongas for piano (1948–59), rural folk music in Tres danzas populares, and historical themes in the Seventh Symphony, commemorating the Argentine Independence Revolution.

== Honours ==
According to one source, Ficher's Heroic Poem, op. 7, won first prize in a 1928 contest sponsored by the Leningrad Philharmonic Orchestra. More recent research, however, reveals that no first prize was awarded, but his work shared the second prize with Dmitri Shostakovich. He won the Municipality of Buenos Aires Prize three times, first in 1929 for his First String Quartet, then in 1931 for Sulamita, poema de amor, for orchestra, and finally in 1941, for his First Piano Sonata. His Second String Quartet was awarded a Coolidge Prize of $500 in 1937, at the Festival de Música de Cámara Panamericana in Mexico City, and his Third Symphony won first prize of the National Culture Committee in Buenos Aires in 1940. In 1969 Ficher was elected to the National Fine Arts Academy of Argentina.

Other prizes include:

- 1929 the Asociación del Profesorado Orquestal Prize for Obertura patética, op. 11
- 1932 the Asociación del Profesorado Orquestal Prize for Tres bocetos sinfónicos inspirados en el Talmud, op. 17
- 1936 second prize in a contest sponsored by the Idelssohn Association of Johannesburg, South Africa for La rosa muerta, poema para coro mixto y piano, op. 34
- 1942 the E.A. Fleisher Collection Prize for his Violin Concerto, op. 46
- 1952 the Asociación Wagneriana Carlos López-Buchardo Prize for his Fourth String Quartet
- 1957 (September) Second Prize at the Festival Interamericano de Música, Montevideo, for his Saxophone Quartet
- 1960 Grand Prize "Sesquicentenario de la Revolución de Mayo" for his Symphony No. 7, Epopeya de mayo, op. 92
- 1961 (November) Argentinean Mozarteum Prize (Academia Nacional de Bellas Artes) for his Piano Quintet

== Compositions ==
Listed by opus number.

- op. 1: Songs without Words (5), for piano (1917, rev. 1949)
- op. 2: Two-part Inventions (4), for piano (1922, rev. 1949)
- op. 3: Grave e presto, for violin solo (1923, rev. 1951)
- op. 4: Preludes (5), for piano (1924, rev. 1951)
- op. 5: Suite No. 1, on popular Jewish themes, for orchestra (1924, rev. 1966)
- op. 6: Suite No. 2, for orchestra (1926)
- op. 7: Poema heroico, for orchestra (1927, rev. 1934)
- op. 8: Sulamita, tone poem (inspired by the novel of Alejandro Kuprin) (1927, rev. 1960)
- op. 9: String Quartet no. 1 (1927, rev. 1947)
- op. 10: Dos poemas de El jardinero de R. Tagore (text: poems 16 and 42 by Rabindranath Tagore), for chamber orchestra (1928)
- op. 11: Obertura patética (1928, rev. as Exodus, 1960)
- op. 12: Dos piezas hebreas, for violin and piano (1928)
- op. 13, no. 1: Canto elegíaco, for cello and piano (1928)
- op. 14: Tres coros a capella (text: Rafael Alberti), for four-voice mixed choir (1928–54)
- op. 15: Sonata no. 1, for violin and piano (1929, rev. 1960)
- op. 16: Suite en estilo antiguo, for flute, oboe, clarinet, bassoon, horn, and trumpet (1930)
- op. 17: Tres bocetos sinfónicos inspirados en el Talmud (1930)
- op. 18: Sonata, for flute, viola, and piano (1931)
- op. 19: Pieces (3), for piano (1932)
- op. 20: Symphony no. 1 (Chamber Symphony) (1932)
- op. 21: Sonatina, for saxophone, trumpet, and piano (1932) [there is also Sapho (tango), for piano, op. 21, pub. Buenos Aires: Ortlli Hermanos, no date]
- op. 22: Variations on a Jewish Popular Theme (1932)
- op. 23: Preludes (3), for piano (1932)
- op. 24: Symphony no. 2 (1933)
- op. 25: Colombina de hoy (Today's Columbian, ballet in 1 act, scenario from N. Evreinov), for two pianos (1933)
- op. 26: Los invitados (The Guests, scenario from B. Romanoff, ballet in 1 act), for orchestra and two pianos (1933)
- op. 27: Dos canciones (text: Gabriela Mistral), for soprano or tenor and piano (rev. 1969)
- op. 28: Cantos de amor de Jehuda Ha-Levy (7), for voice and piano (1934)
- op. 29: Pieces (4), for piano (1934)
- op. 30: Trio, for violin, cello, and piano (1935)
- op. 31: Prelude and Fugue, for piano (1935)
- op. 32, no. 1: Sonata, for flute and piano (1935)
- op. 32, no. 2: Sonata, for clarinet and piano (1937)
- op. 32, no. 3: Sonata, for oboe and piano (1940)
- op. 32, no. 4: Sonata, for bassoon and piano (1970)
- op. 33: Ocho poemas (text: César Tiempo), for voice and piano (1935)
- op. 34: La rosa muerta (The Dead Rose), for mixed choir and piano (1936)
- op. 35: String Quartet no. 2 (1936)
- op. 36: Symphony no. 3 (1938–40)
- op. 37: Tres estampas, first series, for piano (1938)
- op. 38: Seis fábulas, first series, for piano (1938–40)
- op. 39: Cinco piezas infantiles, for piano (1940)
- op. 40: Melchor (ballet in 3 acts, scenario from César Tiempo), for chorus and 14 strings (1938–39)
- op. 41: El organillero (Leónidas Barletta), for bass and orchestra (1940–50)
- op. 42: Tres estampas, second series, for piano (1941)
- op. 43: Tres danzas en estilo popular argentino, for piano (1941)
- op. 44: Sonata no. 1, for piano (1941)
- op. 45: Las siete canciones de Amado Villar, for voice and piano (1941)
- op. 46: Concerto, for violin and orchestra (1942)
- op. 47: Golondrina (ballet in 3 acts, scenario from Leónidas Barletta), for orchestra (1942)
- op. 48: Sonata, for cello and piano (1943)
- op. 49: Sonata no. 2, for piano (1943)
- op. 50: String Quartet no. 3 (1943)
- op. 51: Gaucho, suite from the film score, for chamber orchestra (1944)
- op. 52: Psalm CXIX and "Pulvis eris et pulvis reverteris" (text: Leónidas Barletta), for tenor, female choir, and piano, or organ, or chamber orchestra (1944)
- op. 53: Concerto no. 1, for piano and orchestra (1945)
- op. 54: Preludio, coral y fuga, for piano or for chamber orchestra (1945)
- op. 55: Sonata, for harp (1945)
- op. 56: Sonata no. 2, for violin and piano (1945)
- op. 57: Tres sonetos de Leónidas Barletta, for low voice and piano
- op. 58: Sonetos (3) (Leónidas Barletta), for voice and piano (1946)
- op. 59a: Seis fábulas, second series, for piano (1946, arr. chamber orchestra, op. 59b, 1951)
- op. 60: Symphony no. 4 (1946)
- op. 61: Serenata, for string orchestra (1947)
- op. 62: Introducción y movimiento perpetuo, for violin and piano (1947)
- op. 63: Symphony no. 5 "Asi habló Isaías" (1947)
- op. 64: Tres danzas hebreas, for two pianos (1947)
- op. 65: Pieces (3), for violin and piano or orchestra (1948)
- op. 66: Danzas americanas (6), for piano (1948, revised 1959 as Seis tangos y milongas)
- op. 67: Hamlet, four symphonic movements for orchestra (1948)
- op. 68, no. 1: Sonata, for flute and clarinet (1949)
- op. 68, no. 2: Sonata, for flute, oboe, and bassoon (1950)
- op. 68, no. 3: Sonata a cuatro, for flute, oboe, clarinet, and bassoon (1950)
- op. 69: Salmo de alegría, cantata (text: Rafael Alberti), for solo voices, choir, and orchestra (1949)
- op. 69b: Overture, for the cantata Salmo de alegría, for orchestra (1948)
- op. 70: Two Poems of Longfellow, for voice and piano (1949)
- op. 71: Sonata no. 3, for piano (1950)
- op. 72: Sonata no. 4, for piano (1950)
- op. 73: String Quartet no. 4 (1952)
- op. 74: Tres décimas (text: Manuel F. Rugeles), for voice and piano (1952)
- op. 75: El oso (The Bear, chamber opera, 1 act, text after Anton Chekhov, in Spanish and Russian) (1952)
- op. 76: Pieces (3), for viola and piano (1953)
- op. 77: Canciones del Paraná (6) (Rafael Alberti), for voice and piano (1953)
- op. 78: Suite no. 3, for chamber orchestra (1953)
- op. 79: Baladas del Paraná (4) (texe: Rafael Alberti), for voice and piano (1953)
- op. 80: Sonata, for viola and piano (1953)
- op. 81: Concerto no. 2, for piano and orchestra (1954)
- op. 82: Don Segundo Sombra, overture for orchestra (1954)
- op. 83: Dos coros a capella (text: Francisco L. Bernardez, Nalé Roxlo), for mixed choir (1955)
- op. 84: Pedido de mano (The Proposal, chamber opera, 1 act, text after Anton Chekhov, in Spanish and Russian) (1955–56)
- op. 85: Concerto, for harp and chamber orchestra (1955)
- op. 86: Symphony no. 6 (1956)
- op. 87: Sonata no. 5, for piano (1956)
- op. 88: Rhapsody, for choir and saxophone quartet (1956)
- op. 89: Quartet, for soprano, alto, tenor, and baritone saxophones (1957, also transcribed for flute, oboe, clarinet, and bassoon, or for string quartet)
- op. 90: Oda a la libertad (text: José Isaacson), for narrator and orchestra (1957)
- op. 91: Mi Aldea (Manuel Felipe Rugeles), cantata for soprano, alto, tenor, and chamber orchestra (1958)
- op. 92: Symphony no. 7 "Epopeya de mayo" (May Epic, 1958–59)
- op. 93: Sonata no. 3, for violin and piano (1959)
- op. 94: Cinco sonetos de Shakespeare (text trans.: Manuel Mujica-Lainez), for voice and orchestra
- op. 95: Variations and Fugue on a Theme of Mozart, for orchestra (1961)
- op. 96: Quintet, for piano and string quartet (1961)
- op. 97: Sonata no. 6, for piano (1961)
- op. 98: Obertura festiva, for orchestra (1962)
- op. 99: Toccata, for piano (1963)
- op. 100: Cinco poemas, for voice and piano (1963)
- op. 101: Sonata no. 7, for piano (1964)
- op. 102: Cinco sonetos de amor (text: Manuel Felipe Rugeles), for voice and piano (1964)
- op. 103: Concerto no. 3, for piano and orchestra (1964)
- op. 104: Cuatro sonetos de amor (text: Manuel Felipe Rugeles), for mixed choir (1964)
- op. 105: Symphony no. 8 (1965)
- op. 106: Poema, for two pianos (1966)
- op. 107: Concerto, for flute and chamber orchestra (1968)
- op. 108: Wind Quintet (1969)
- op. 109: Tres poemas, for soprano or tenor and piano (1969)
- op. 110: Tres canciones, for soprano or tenor and piano (1969)
- op. 111: Prelude, Siciliana, and Fugue, for two pianos (1969)
- op. 112: Kadish, cantata (text: Arminda Ralesky), for soprano, alto, tenor, and bass soloists, chorus, and orchestra (1969)
- op. 113: Cinco retratos, for piano (1970)
- op. 114: Tres coros a cappella (text: Alfonsina Storni), for mixed choir (1970)
- op. 115: Sonata no. 8, for piano (1971)
- op. 116: Tre pezzi, for brass and percussion (1971)
- op. 117: Tres canciones, for soprano or tenor and piano (1971)
- op. 118: Introduzione ed allegro, for flute, oboe, bassoon, piano, violin, and viola (1971)
- op. 119: Preludes (4), for piano (1971)
- op. 120: Tres coros a cappella, for mixed choir (1971)
- op. 121: Capriccio Argentina, for orchestra (1972)
- op. 122: Sonata no. 9, for piano (1972)
- op. 123: Symphony no. 9 (1973)
- op. 124: Cinco sonetos (text: Cordoba Iturburu), for soprano or tenor and piano (1973)
- op. 125: Cuatro coros a capella, for mixed choir (1973)
- op. 126: Tres canciones, for soprano and piano (1973)
- op. 127: Cuatro piezas para cuatro solistas, for flute, oboe, clarinet, and bassoon (1974)
- op. 128: Concerto, for cello and orchestra (1974)
- op. 129: Pieces (3), for piano (1975)
- op. 130: Obertura dramática, for orchestra (1975)
- op. 131: Symphony no. 10 (text: Jorge Luis Borges), for 2 solo voices, choir, and orchestra (1976–77)
- op. 132: Cuatro poemas, for [?voice and piano] (text: Arminda Ralesky) (1977)

Works without opus number:

- Los afincaos, film score (1941)
- ¡Gaucho!, film score (1942)
- Ponchos azules, film score (1942)
- Polka, for piano (1948)
- Cría de caballos de carrera, documentary film score (1953)
- Algodón, documentary film score (undated)
- Primavera sin nieve, documentary film score (undated)
- El murciélago, for voice and piano (text: Alfonso Ferrari-Amores) (undated)

== Discography ==
- South American Chamber Music. (Includes Ficher's "Palabras a mamá", op. 33, no. 2, from Ocho poemas de César Tiempo, for voice and piano, and works by Fernandez, Broqua, Mignone, Pedrell, Santa Cruz, Sas, Uribe-Holguin, and Villa-Lobos). Olga Averino, soprano; Alfredo St. Malo, violin; Fritz Magg, cello; Nicolas Slonimsky, piano. 78 RPM recording, 4 sound discs: analog, 78 rpm, 12 in. Columbia Masterworks M 437 (70714-D; 70715-D; 70716-D; 70717-D) [Bridgeport, Conn.?]: Columbia, 1941. Reissued with additional material, as History Making Premieres. LP recording 1 sound disc: analog, 33 1/3 rpm, stereo, 12 in. Orion ORS 7150; ORD 7150. Los Angeles: Orion, 1972.
- Obras para Violin Solo de Compositores Argentinos/Works for Solo Violin by Argentine Composers Vol. II. (Includes Ficher's Grave y presto, op. 3, and works by Giacobbe, Camps, Graetzer, Abras, Roel, and Bruno-Videla.) Alejandro Drago, violin. CD recording, 1 sound disc: digital, 4 3/4 in. Tradition TR070427. [Buenos Aires]: Tradition, 2007.
- Musica Orquestal desde la Cancilleria Argentina / Orchestral Music from the Argentine Foreign Office (1955). Buenos Aires Philharmonic Orchestra. Documentae Historicae Argentinae. Serie Histórica: Archive Performances. Serie de Bicentenario 1810–2010. (Includes Ficher's Suite from El Gaucho, op. 51, and works by Alberto Ginastera, Washington Castro, and others.) 2-CD set, 2 sound discs: digital, 4 3/4 in. Tradition. [Buenos Aires]: Tradition, 2010.
