= Luis Gianneo =

Argentine musician (1897–1968)

Luis Gianneo (9 January 1897 – 15 August 1968) was an Argentine composer, pianist and conductor. As music educator, he was the teacher of composers Ariel Ramirez, Juan Carlos Zorzi, Marta Lambertini, Virtú Maragno, Pedro Ignacio Calderón and Rodolfo Arizaga, among others. Founder of Orquesta Juvenil de Radio Nacional and co-founder of Symphonic Orchestra of Tucumán.

Gianneo is acknowledged as a leading Argentine composer and one of the most influential members of the Grupo renovación, which he joined in 1931. He composed nearly 100 works including every genre except opera. His earliest compositions exhibit the influence of indigenous culture and landscape of northwest Argentina; after joining the Grupo renovación, he adopted a neoclassical approach; in 1960 he traveled to Europe, where he met Goffredo Petrassi and Luigi Dallapiccola, who brought his attention to the post-war avant-gardists and prompted him to incorporate a dissonant atonal language and free use of serialism in his late works.

== Homage ==
To commemorate the 50th anniversary of his death, with two concerts in the Salón Dorado of the Teatro Colón, on 4 August and on 25 August 2018 respectively, the Cuarteto Gianneo performed the world live premiere of his complete works for string quartet, including the four strings quartets, Three Creole Pieces, and Four Incaicos Songs.

== Works ==
- Suite (1933)
- El Tarco en Flor (1930)
- Pampeanas
- Turay-Turay (1927)
- Tres piezas criollas for string quartet (1936)
- Cuarteto Criollo No. 1 for strings (1936)
- Obertura para una Comedia Infantil, (1937)
- Sonatina, (1938)
- Cinco pequeñas piezas, (1938)
- Concertino-Serenata (1938)
- Sonata No. 2 for piano (1943)
- Concierto Aymará for violin and orchestra, (1942)
- Cuarteto Criollo No. 2 (1948) for strings
- Improvisación, (1948)
- Variaciones sobre un tema de tango
- String Quartet No. 3 (1952)
- Piano Sonata No. 3, (1957)
- Seis Bagatelas, (1957–1959)
- String Quartet No. 4 (1963)
- Antífona, symphony
- Agnus Dei, cantata
- Poema de la Saeta
- Obertura del Sesquicentenario
