= Argentine Open Theatre =

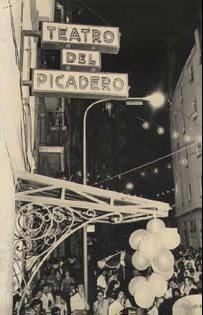
Spectators line up at the Picadero Theatre for the premiere of the Argentine Open Theatre

The Argentine Open Theatre was an independent theatre movement in Buenos Aires, Argentina.

== Overview ==
=== Origins ===
The theatre in Argentina had developed alongside the nation's emergence as a modern economy in the late 19th and early 20th centuries. Independent and experimental theatre, however, had long endured in the shadows of commercial productions (for which Buenos Aires' Corrientes Avenue became particularly well known). Many of the playwrights prominent in this movement were also politically opinionated, and their plays' left-leaning subtext were frowned upon by powerful figures in the Argentine military and the publishing sector, alike. Increasing repression became a serious threat to artistic freedom in the years shortly before and during the country's last dictatorship.

=== Opportunity and peril ===
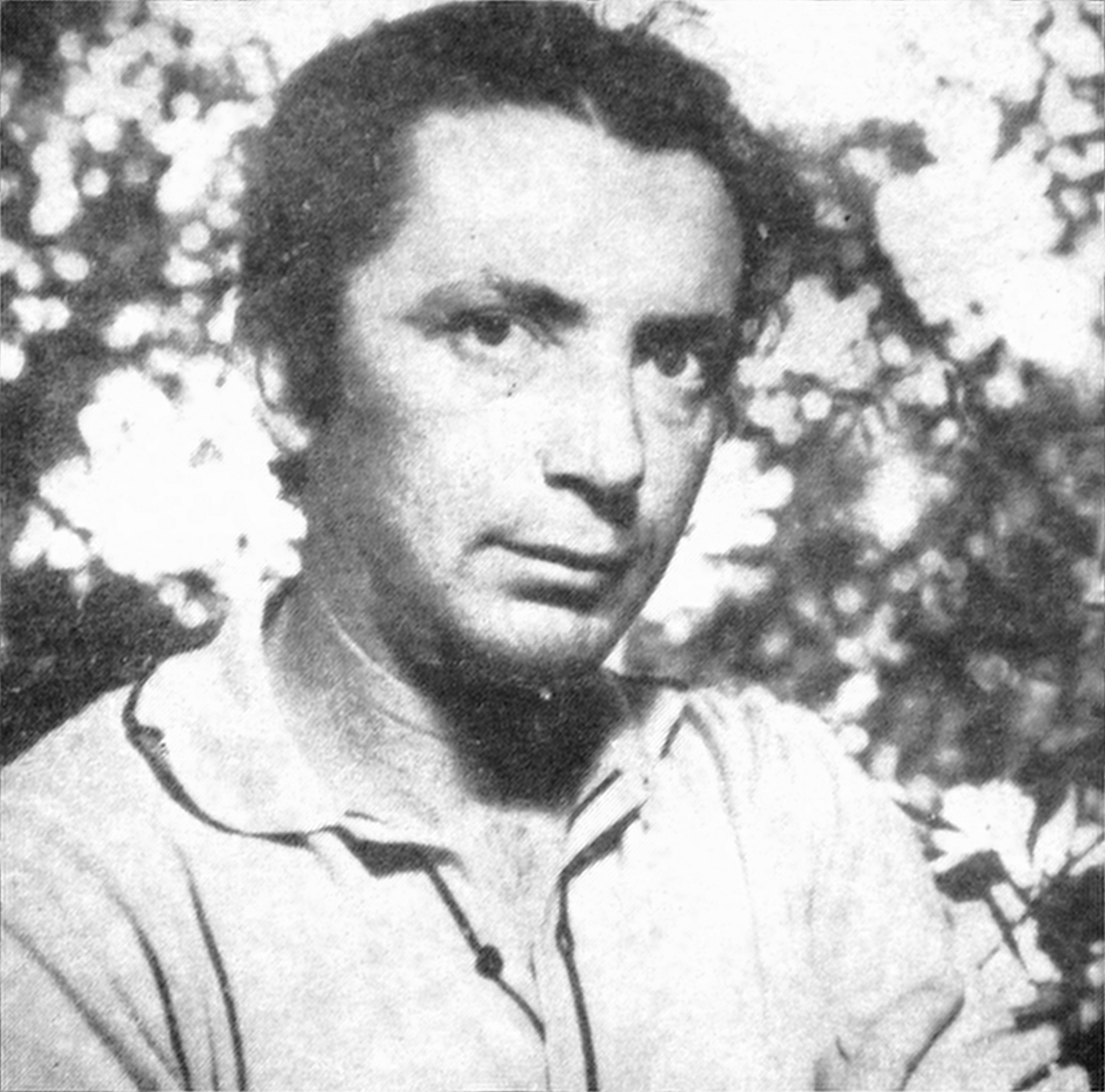
Playwright Osvaldo Dragún devised the Open Theatre as a vehicle for legal resistance to the day's repressive climate.

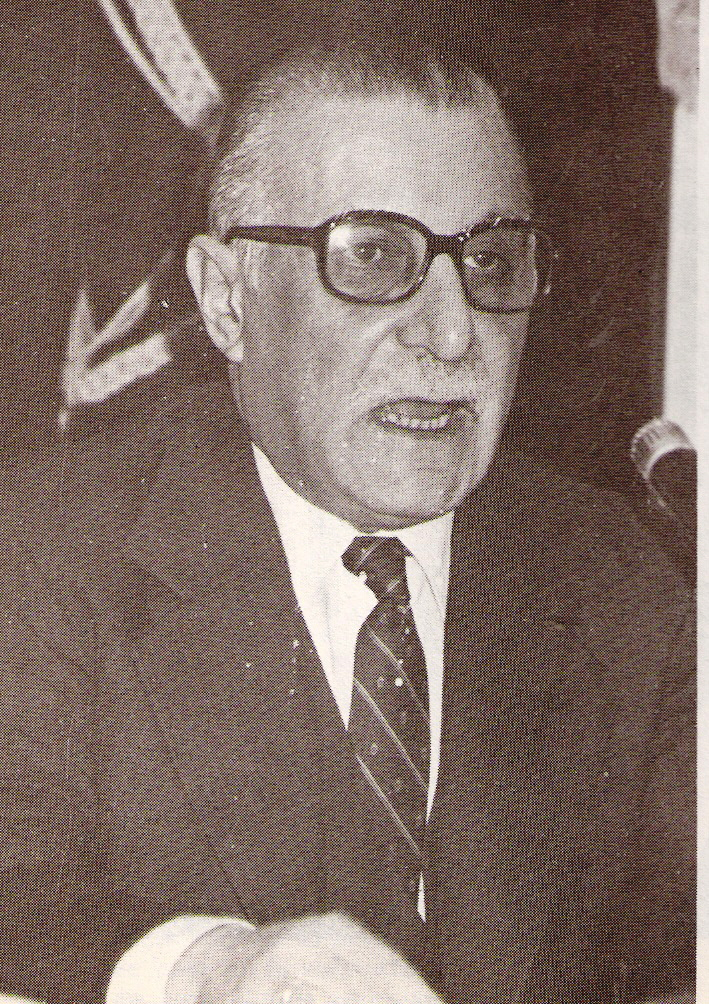
Dictator Roberto Viola allowed the festival, believing it could help counter international criticism of military rule.

Intimidation and pressure were eased somewhat in 1980, however, with the support of the relatively moderate Army Chief, General Roberto Viola. Playwright Osvaldo Dragún seized the opportunity to organize a new theatre movement, calling on fellow playwrights Roberto Cossa and Carlos Gorostiza, as well as renowned theatre actors Luis Brandoni, Jorge Rivera López and Pepe Soriano. They purchased a shuttered sparkplug factory on Santos Discépolo Way (a pedestrianized backstreet in the crowded Balvanera district of Buenos Aires) into the "Picadero Theatre." Honored by the presence and support of Nobel laureate Adolfo Pérez Esquivel and writer Ernesto Sábato, the group announced, in a May 12, 1981, press conference, the establishment of the Teatro Abierto Argentino - the "Argentine Open Theatre." Sensitive both to the repressive climate and to the sharp economic crisis, playwright Carlos Somigliana penned the Open Theatre's mission statement, declaring that:

Being the theatre the cultural and social phenomenon that it is, we shall strive to recover the public at large with productions of great quality and modestly priced tickets.

They premiered their first festival on July 28, 1981, featuring Cossa's Gris de ausencia (Pale of Absence), Dragún's Mi obelisco y yo (My Obelisk and Me), and Gorostiza's El acompañamiento (The Entourage) among the evening's repertoire. During an August 6 performance, however, three fire bombs were set off in the theatre, casting doubts on the company's viability (the incident remains one of Argentina's best-known "unsolved mysteries"). Sixteen prominent Buenos Aires theatres offered them their stages, however, and the Open Theatre relocated to the larger Tabaris Theatre, a Corrientes Avenue landmark known for its revue. The Open Theatre reopened two days later and its 1981 season ran until September 21, featuring 21 directors, over 150 cast and crew, and bringing together some 25,000 spectators. Organizer Osvaldo Dragún declared that "today the open theatre belongs to the entire nation."

=== Winning back the streets ===
The ongoing economic collapse and replacement of President Viola for the hard-line General Leopoldo Galtieri led the company to plan the 1982 season with more precautions. Playwrights were invited to submit works well in advance, and the repertoire was expanded to include works of experimental theatre. Playwright Ricardo Monti contributed to the effort by publishing the "Open Theatre Magazine," a quarterly publication. The magazine provided a forum for potential participants as much as it prudently kept authorities abreast of its developments. Other fund-raising efforts included a coffee-table book, Teatro Abierto 1981, which sold 8,000 copies. None of the participants accepted compensation beyond covering their personal expenses related to the event, and any surplus profits were returned to the struggling company's fund.

The Open Theatre's 1982 season, whose slogan was "winning back the streets," opened in late September with Dragún's Al violador (To the Rapist); Eugenio Griffero's provocative look at gay life in Argentina, Príncipe azul (Blue Prince); and Somigliana's daring criticism of the military, Oficial primero ("Commissioned Officer"), among other works from 30 other directors. Controversy ensued, however, when a number of well-known directors' works were passed over, notably Pacho O'Donnell's; negative national sentiment on the heels of the disastrous Falklands War helped further dampen interest in the season, which closed in November.

The 1983 season was produced in the Margarita Xirgu Theatre amid Argentina's imminent return to democracy, and its featured plays were more politically daring than those of the two previous seasons. Dragún's Hoy se comen al flaco (Today They'll Take the Skinny Guy) headlined the opening night on September 24. Banned by the dictatorship, murgas were included in the season as theatrical works. The carnival-like marches often paraded out of the theatre house, and included banned left-wing themes. Other works included odes to tragedies in Chile and Nicaragua. The season concluded with a murga marching against censorship, and the burning of an effigy of censorship itself ("La Censurona").

=== The theatre strikes back ===
El teatrazo ("The Attack of the Theatre") as the slogan of the 1984 season was thought of by its organizers as way to "share our opinion in the context of liberty." The return of democracy, however, also helped deprive the festival of its status as the leading forum for artistic defiance of a repressive regime; indeed, one of the Open Theatre's leading figures, Carlos Gorostiza, had been appointed Secretary of Culture by newly elected President Raúl Alfonsín. Following the failure of the 1984 season, much of which was cancelled, the company dedicated its 1985 season to young playwrights. That season featured works from throughout Latin America and, opening on September 21, it was more successful than its predecessor; but a sixth season was cancelled, leaving the Open Theatre a place in Argentine history as "a modest popular resistance and, among the cultural ones, the most visible."
