= Roberto Cossa =

Argentine playwright and theatre director (1934–2024)

Roberto M. Cossa
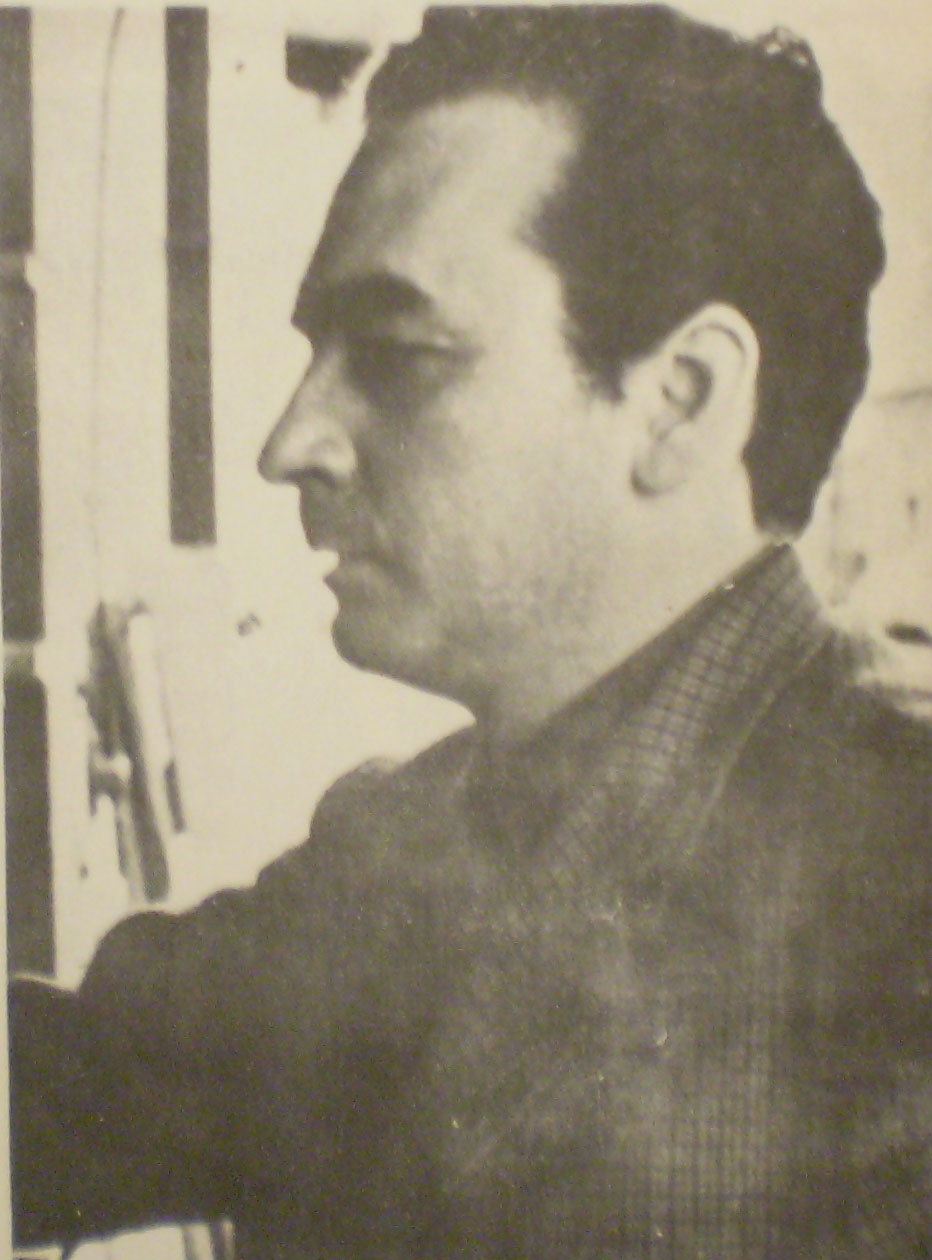
- Cossa in 1968
- Born: 30 November 1934; Buenos Aires, Argentina
- Died: 6 June 2024 (aged 89)
- Occupations: Playwright, theatre director
- Known for: La nona; The Deal (film); Funny Dirty Little War; Yepeto

Roberto M. Cossa (30 November 1934 – 6 June 2024) was an Argentine playwright and theatre director.

== Life and work ==
Roberto Cossa was born in Buenos Aires, Argentina, and raised in the quiet residential borough of Villa del Parque. He first acted in the theatre at the age of 17 and, in 1957, he and friends founded the San Isidro Independent Theatre. An admirer of Fidel Castro, he worked secretly as a local correspondent for Cuba's state-owned press agency, Prensa Latina, between 1960 and 1970. Cossa produced his first play, Nuestro fín de semana ("Our Weekend") in 1964. The Neo-realist work earned him many Argentinian drama prizes. Contributing to the cultural sections of mainstream Argentine newsdailies such as Clarín, La Opinión and La Nación between 1971 and 1976, Cossa avoided direct political references in his work. One exception to this was his play El avión negro ("The Black Plane", 1970), a commentary on exiled populist leader Juan Perón's 1964 attempt to return to Argentina.

Following a fallow creative period, Cossa premiered La nona ("Grandma") in 1977. His most successful play, La nona represented a turn towards the grotesque in which the protagonist, a hundred-year-old Italian Argentine grandmother, burdens her working-class family with her senile dementia and ravenous appetite. La nona, is still revived in Buenos Aires and elsewhere and was adapted into a film version in 1979.

The climate of repression that prevailed in Argentina during its last dictatorship eased somewhat in 1980 as General Jorge Videla prepared to transfer power to General Roberto Viola, an advocate for increased, if limited, artistic freedom. Playwright Osvaldo Dragún seized the opportunity to organize an Teatro Abierto ("Open Theatre") movement, calling on Cossa and fellow playwrights Luis Brandoni, Jorge Rivera López and Pepe Soriano, as well as receiving support from prominent intellectuals such as Nobel Peace Prize laureate Adolfo Pérez Esquivel and writer Ernesto Sábato. Refurbishing a former Buenos Aires sparkplug factory into the Picadero Theatre, they premiered their first festival on 28 July 1981, featuring Cossa's Gris de ausencia ("Pale of Absence") among the evening's repertoire. During an 6 August performance, however, three fire bombs were set off in the theatre, forcing the Open Theatre to relocate (The Picadero was reopened in 2001).

Cossa's successful adaptation of La nona into a film encouraged him to provide screenplays for his play El arreglo ("The Deal") and No habrá más penas ni olvido ("Dirty Little War") in 1983. Both were indictments of the problems of corruption and revenge in Argentine society. His theatre works became more prolific following democratic elections in 1983 and included Ya nadie recuerda a Frederic Chopin ("No One Remembers F.C."), a study in frustrating exile, De pies y manos ("On Hands and Feet"), a realist look into the effect of the dictatorship on one family, and Los compadritos ("The Poseurs"), a controversial review of the events surrounding the 1939 sinking of the Graf Spee.

Cossa, in 1987, premiered what would become his most successful work since La nona, Yepeto ("Gepetto"). A character study, it sets an aging drama professor in a love triangle with two students, one a young woman leading a charmed life with whom he becomes infatuated and the other an impetuous young man whom the teacher feels he must rescue from himself, despite his jealousy for the unabashed youth. The tension made Yepeto a hit in Argentine theatres and, starring Ulises Dumont, it ran for about 5,000 performances in the 1990s before its 1999 film release.

Conferred the National Theatre Prize Argentina and the Public and Critics Prize of Spain, Cossa was appointed President of the General Society of Argentine Authors in 2007.

== Death ==
Costa died on 6 June 2024, at the age of 89.

== Plays ==
- Nuestro fin de semana (1964)
- Los días de Julián Bisbal (1966)
- La ñata contra el libro (1966)
- La pata de la sota (1967)
- El avión negro (1970)
- El tío loco (1974)
- La Nona (1976)
- No hay que llorar (1979)
- El viejo criado (1979)
- Gris de ausencia (1981)
- Tute Cabrero (1981)
- Ya nadie recuerda a Frédéric Chopin (1982)
- El viento se los llevó (1983)
- De pies y manos (1984)
- Los compadritos (1985)
- Yepeto (1986)
- El sur y después (1986)
- Angelito (1991)
- Lejos de aquí (1993)
- Viejos conocidos (1994)
- Los años difíciles (1997)
- Pingüinos (2001)
- Historia de varieté (2002)
- Definitivamente adiós (2003)
- De cirujas, putas y suicidas (2005)
