= Osvaldo Dragún =

Argentine Dramatist (1929-1999)

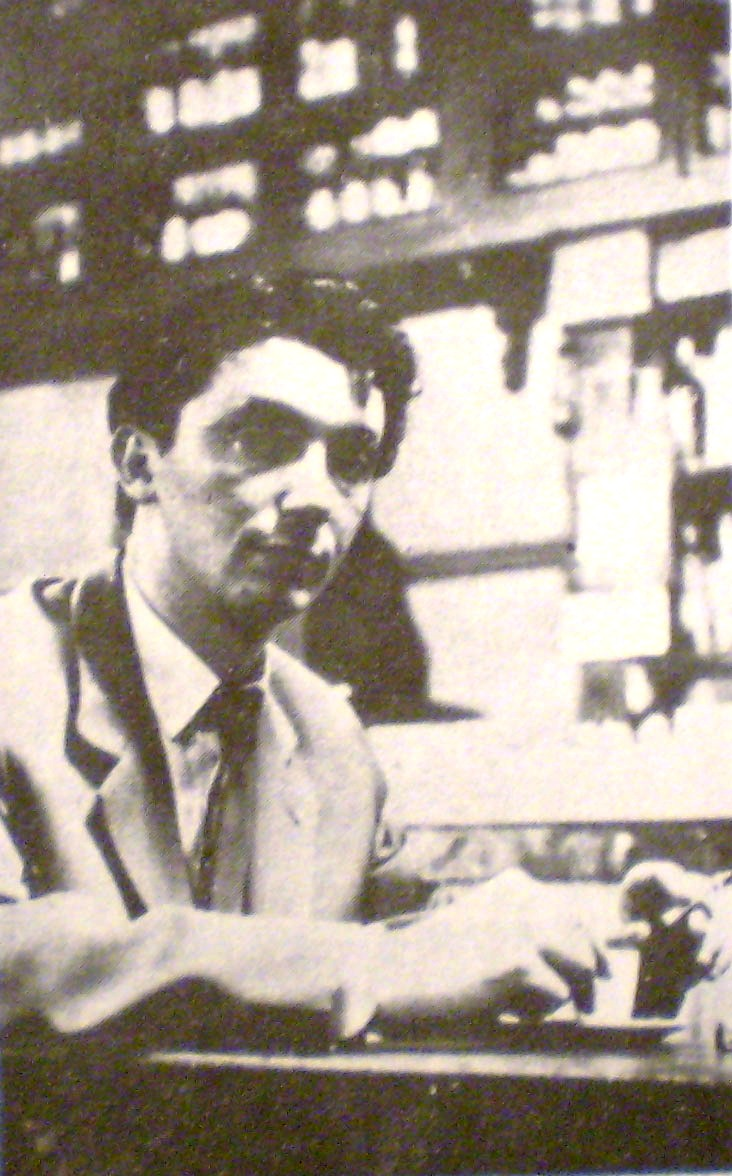
Osvaldo "Chacho" Dragún

Osvaldo Dragún (May 7, 1929 Entre Ríos, Argentina –June 14, 1999 Buenos Aires, Argentina) was a prominent Argentine playwright and the director of Cervantes Theater.

== Life and work ==
Osvaldo Dragún was born in Colonia Berro, a Jewish agricultural settlement, near San Salvador in Entre Ríos Province, Argentina. After his father's linseed farm suffered from recurrent locust problems, the family left the settlement for Buenos Aires. Dragún left his university studies in 1953 to pursue his calling in the theatre. Joining the Fray Mocho Theatre in 1956, he premiered his first work, La peste viene de Melos (The Plague from Melos). The politically charged play, on the 1954 coup d'état against Guatemalan President Jacobo Árbenz, drew also from the playwright's own childhood memories of his father's struggles with locusts.

He continued to write controversial works for the Fray Mocho, including Historias para ser contadas (Tales to be Told), a series of short plays including Historia del hombre que se convirtió en perro (The Story of the Man Who Turned into a Dog), Tupac Amaru and Milagro en el mercado viejo (Miracle at the Old Market), for which he received the Casa de las Américas Prize in 1962. His 1966 play, Heroica de Buenos Aires received the same distinction. That June, however, one of Argentine independent theatre's most powerful opponents, General Juan Carlos Onganía, took power in a quiet coup. Dragún's stays abroad, which had begun in 1961, became more frequent, directing plays in several other Latin American countries and in the United States. He continued to write politically themed plays, however, notably Historias con cárcel (Stories and Jail). He helped establish the Campana Comedy Theatre in 1969 and, six years later, premiered El Jardín del Infierno ("The Garden of Hell") there.

By then, independent Argentine theatre was limited not only by the boom in commercial theatre productions; but also by a climate of repression. Threats to artistic freedom during the country's last dictatorship were eased somewhat in 1980 with the support of the relatively moderate Army Chief, General Roberto Viola. Dragún then premiered his ¿Y por casa cómo andamos? (How're We Doing at Home?), a commentary on unhappy, paternalistic households and their effects on culture. The slowly improving climate of freedoms also led Dragún to form a partnership with fellow playwrights Carlos Gorostiza and Roberto Cossa, as well as with numerous actors, to form an "Argentine Open Theatre", by which they hoped to encourage a return of the freedom of expression whose absence had led so many other cultural figures to leave Argentina since 1975. Converting a shuttered spark plug factory in the Balvanera district of Buenos Aires to the "Picadero Theatre," they premiered a festival of their collective new works (including Dragún's Mi obelisco y yo - "My Obelisk and Me") to acclaim on July 28, 1981. This success was marred by the theatre's fire bombing a week later, still an "unsolved mystery."

The setback did not shutter the Open Theatre, however, which reopened in Corrientes Avenue's famed Tabaris Theatre (well-known locally for its revue). The Open Theatre's 1982 season, whose slogan was "winning back the streets," featured Dragún's Al violador (To the Rapist). The play was one in a trilogy that included Al perdedor (To the loser) - a semi-biographical look at ill-fated boxer José María Gatica - and Al vencedor (To the Victor). Following the Open Theatre's final season, in 1985, he wrote Arriba, corazón (Take Heart). The 1987 play was a success, and in 1988 Dragún established the Theatre School of Latin America and the Caribbean in Havana (where he lived for a time), and reopened the Popular Theatre in Buenos Aires, in 1989.

Dragún relocated to Mexico City; but returned in 1996 to accept the prestigious post of Director of the Cervantes National Theatre. He helped revive the struggling Cervantes by organizing "theatre marathons" and the Ibero-American Theatre Encounters, which highlighted troupes from the Argentine hinterland and from other countries in the region, respectively. The director of the Cervantes was enjoying a night out with his wife at the Gran Splendid Cinema (today the El Ateneo Grand Splendid bookstore) on June 14, 1999, when he lost his life to heart failure at age 70.

The outspoken Osvaldo Dragún was often out of favor among his colleagues, about which he once said:

I've always lived on islands. Cuba is an island, and the Fray Mocho Theatre was, too. My hope is that one day, these islands will be the continent of creativity and magic.
