= Harto the Borges =

- Poster Release
- Directed by: Eduardo Montes-Bradley
- Written by: Eduardo Montes-Bradley
- Produced by: Contrakultura Films
- Starring: Jorge Luis Borges, Ariel Dorfman, Christian Ferrer, Martin Caparros, Osvaldo Bayer, Franco Lucentini, Horacio Gonzalez, Paolo Collo
- Narrated by: Eduardo Montes-Bradley
- Cinematography: Eduardo Montes-Bradley
- Edited by: Eduardo Montes-Bradley and Eduardo López
- Distributed by: Heritage Film Project, Alexander Street Press, Kanopy
- Release date: September 2000
- Running time: 80 minutes
- Country: Argentina
- Languages: Spanish and Italian
- Budget: U$S 120,000

Harto the Borges is a documentary film by Eduardo Montes-Bradley. Harto the Borges explores the narcissistic side of Jorge Luis Borges, the author of El Aleph, his frequent and often criticized comments to the press, his distinctive and gentle ironies. Harto The Borges had a theatrical release in Buenos Aires in September 2000, and was well received by the critics. Since then has been frequently exhibited at forums, campuses, and film festivals. On October 4, 2011, Harto the Borges was presented at the University of Salamanca, and made available to the general audience in Argentina through the On Line version of Revista Cultura Ñ, (Diario Clarin) in Buenos Aires. The film was released alongside an article in which the director views the film ten years after its premier at the Cine Cosmos. The film is currently available on Vimeo. Harto the Borges was presented at the Festival Internacional del Nuevo Cine Latinoamericano, Havana, Cuba, 2000 and nominated for Premio Cóndor de Plata.

== Synopsis ==
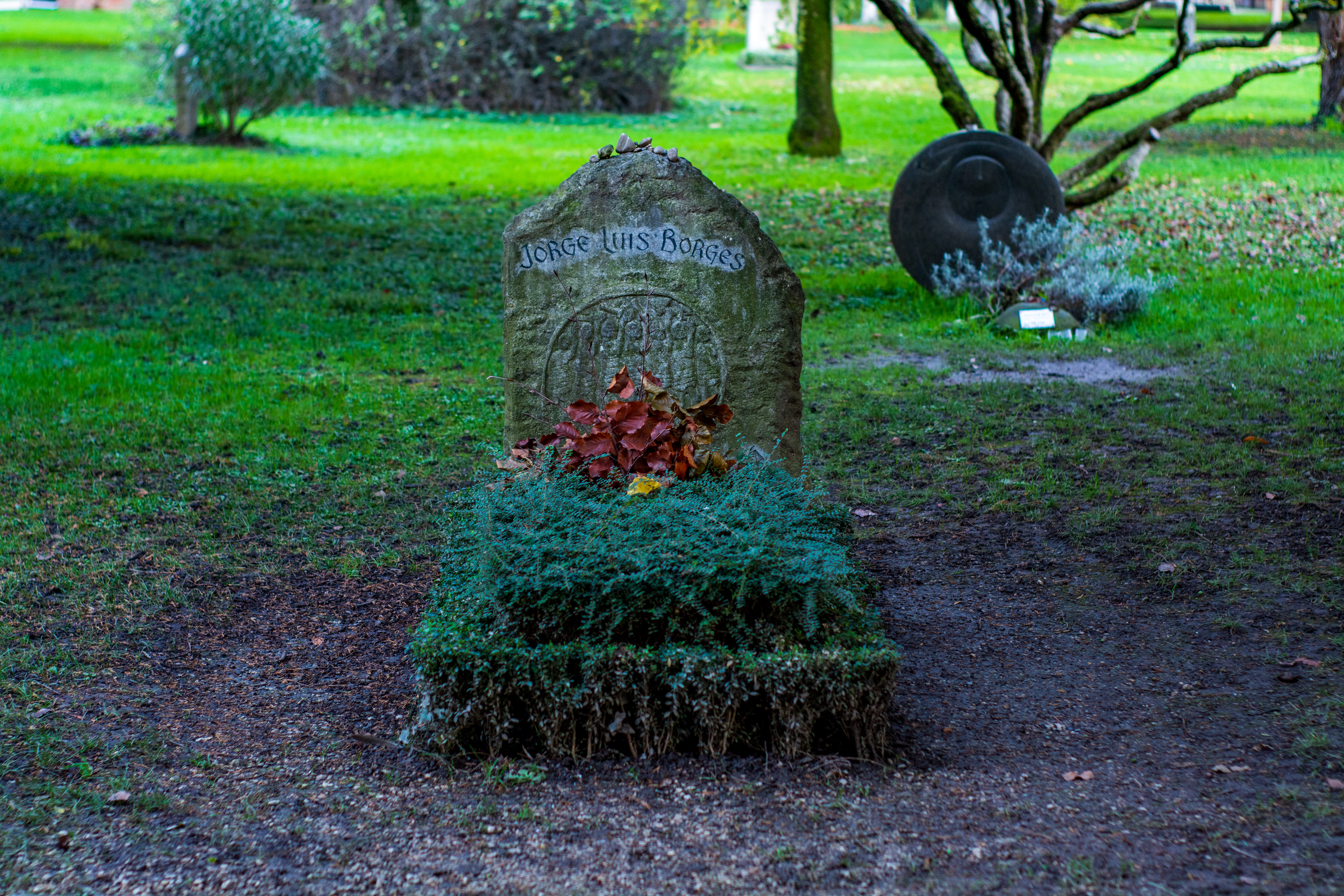
Borges's tombstone in Geneva

Borges emerges as a counterpoint to the interviewees, some of which evoke scandal and most of which cut through stereotypes and presuppositions surrounding this key figure. The title of the film is a direct reference to the poem "Borges and I", slightly modified to pay a tribute to the writer's billings. The strategy employed by Montes-Bradley when it comes to Borges, a writer of whom almost everything has been said, consists on giving the word to the writer himself and to a select group of intellectuals who dwell on the margins of the Argentine cultural aparatik. Montes-Bradley, however, does not exhibit Borges like a painting to be admired but rather as a counterpoint to the observations of others. We are neither the hapless witnesses of another saccharine celebration of Jorge Luis Borges, nor are we forced to endure another fashionable defrocking of an idol. The Borges that emerges from the interaction of the testimonies in this documentary surges from the heat of the debate, from the strong opinions, some certainly scandalous, most politically incorrect. On the tenth anniversary of its theatrical release, Montes-Bradley writes an opinion column on Diario Clarín with considerations about the film in retrospective.

=== Review and quotes ===
"El documental de Eduardo Montes Bradley Harto de Borges, con variados testimonios y material de archivo, aporta una mirada crítica sobre la veneración al escritor. Sin embargo, en su afán desmitificador agiganta su fantasma."

"Harto the Borges grabs and holds the audience from the beginning with a strong documentary style. Montes-Bradley owns a nervous and inquisitive camera with multiple suggestive angles to explore the other side of Borges" | La Nación, , Buenos Aires, September 19, 2000.

"In Harto the Borges Montes-Bradley crafts a documentary as intelligent and provocative as the subject it portraits"| Clarín, "De ideas y paradojas"., Buenos Aires, October 14, 2000.

== Billing block ==
Harto the Borges was made possible with a grant from the National Institute of Cinema and Audiovisual Arts. Produced by Iruña Films (Argentina). Producer: Soledad Liendo. Associate Producer Sara Kaplan. Direct Sound: Jadur Mantecón. Soundmix: Mario Fachinsky and Gaspar Schever. Animation scenes designed by Vicky Biagiola and Liliana Romero. Lab: DuArt (New York), Continental Film (Miami), and Videocolor (Buenos Aires). Offline BIN CINE. Color by Gustavo Gorzanczany. Masterization: Accord Productions, Miami. Final credits thank the University of Virginia, University of Notre Dame, University of Texas at Austin, Instituto Español de Cooperación, Universidad de Salamanca, Gianni Mina, and others. Directed and edited by Eduardo Montes-Bradley.

== Interviews and locations ==
A number of interviews were filmed in Super 16mm, and digital DV using cameras Aaton, and Sony VX1000. Interviews were conducted by Montes-Bradley on location in Buenos Aires with Jorge Luis Borges, Ariel Dorfman, Horacio Gonzalez, Christian Ferrer, Martín Caparrós, and Alejandro Horowicz; Berlin: Osvaldo Bayer; Turin: Franco Lucentini and Paolo Collo; Montevideo: Luis Sepúlveda. Other locations: Geneva, Paris.

== Awards and honors ==
- Official Selection. 12e Rencontres Cinémas d'Amerique Latine. Toulouse, Mars 2000.
