= Julian Bond: Reflections from the Frontlines of the Civil Rights Movement =

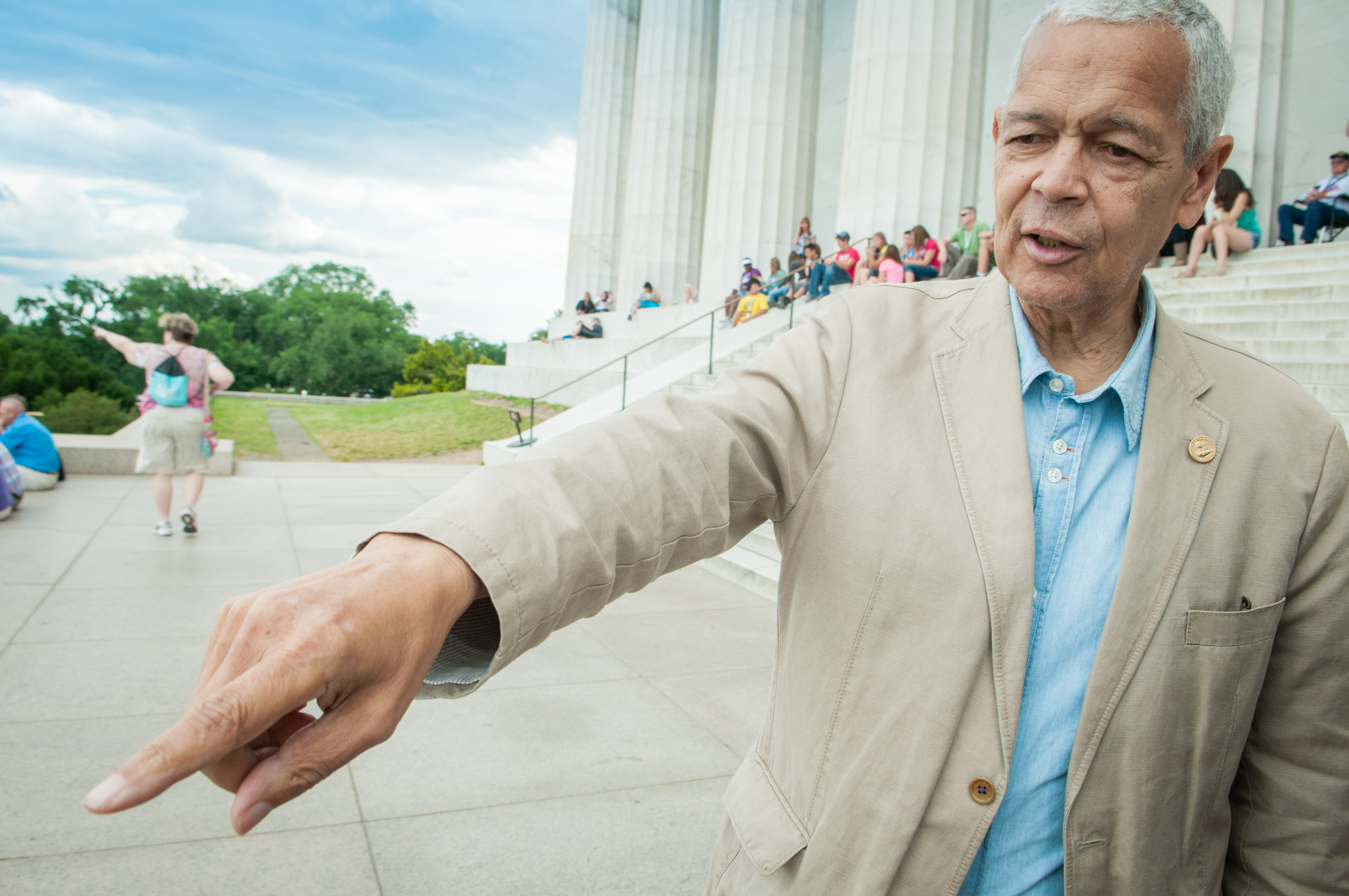
- Julian Bond by Eduardo Montes-Bradley
- Directed by: Eduardo Montes-Bradley
- Written by: Eduardo Montes-Bradley
- Produced by: Heritage Film Project
- Starring: Julian Bond
- Music by: Various
- Distributed by: Kanopy Streaming, Alexander Street Press, Filmakers Library
- Release date: October 2012
- Running time: 30 minutes
- Country: United States
- Language: English

Julian Bond: Reflections from the Frontlines of the Civil Rights Movement is a documentary film by Eduardo Montes-Bradley for Heritage Film Project, a portrait of social activist and former Georgia legislator Julian Bond.

In the film Bond approaches the Civil Rights Movement from a personal perspective. "Bond's father was the first African-American president of Pennsylvania's Lincoln University, and the family hosted black luminaries in education and the arts, but Bond recalls growing up in the era of "separate but equal" laws". Julian Bond premiered at the Virginia Film Festival on November 4, 2012.

== Synopsis ==
The film is built around an in-depth interview with Julian Bond conducted by the director at the Sixth & I Synagogue. Portions of his last class's faculty in the History Department at the University of Virginia are also included. The Key interview is bolstered by a barrage of photographs and archival footage taken from multiple archival sources. These images help define and illustrate the historical context, from the American Civil War to the 2008 US presidential election and the inauguration of President Barack Obama.

Through interviews and archival images and footage, the film documents Julian Bond's life and the role he played during the Civil Rights Movement. The first part of the film concentrates on the historical factors that led to the March on Washington on August 28, 1963. These factors are brought to light through the telling of the sagas of Bond's grandfather, James Bond—a man born in slavery who went on to graduate from Berea College and Oberlin College—and Jane Arthur Bond, Julian's great-grandmother. Julian's father, Horace Mann Bond, a one-time president of Lincoln College in Pennsylvania, is also considered. The family-related aspects of the film are carefully illustrated with photos from the Bond family albums that were loaned to the producers.

The second act begins with the March on Washington and Bond's entrance into politics at age 23 and concludes with his manifest opposition to the Vietnam War.

The conclusion begins by showing Bond's formal acceptance as an elected representative in the Georgia House of Representatives, after finally winning a three-year court battle against the legislative body that had originally refused him his seat due to positions he had taken on issues relating to the Vietnam War. This is followed by segments that show Bond's nomination for Vice President of the United States at the 1968 Democratic National Convention; his failed attempt to obtain the nomination for the presidency in 1976; and a succession of events leading to the 2008 presidential election when Barack Obama became the first African American president of the United States.

== Filming locations ==
The principal interviews with Bond used in the film were conducted at Sixth & I Synagogue in Washington D.C., and at the University of Virginia in Charlottesville. Additional filming was done at the Lincoln Memorial in Washington, D.C.

== Release ==
Julian Bond first screened at the Virginia Film Festival on November 4, 2012, at the Nau Auditorium, on grounds at the University of Virginia, followed by screening the following year as part of "A Living Legend: The University of Virginia Honors Julian Bond". It has since screened at multiple film festivals and events, including a 2014 Black History Month screening at the Jefferson-Madison Regional Library. Two years later it was shown at the British Academy as part of a retrospective "Civil Rights Documentary Cinema and the 1960s : Transatlantic Conversations on History, Race and Rights". The film was registered with the U.S. Copyright Office in 2025."U.S. Copyright Public Catalog record: Julian Bond: Reflections from the Civil Rights Movement". U.S. Copyright Office Public Catalog. Library of Congress.

== Reception ==
According to Giles Morris of the C-Ville Weekly, the gems of the film are the "off-guard moments" when Julian Bond relates to Montes-Bradley how Jim Crow was perceived by a child (himself) in the first half of the 1950s. Patricia Ann Owens of the School Library Journal was also favorable, noting that Julian Bond was classroom friendly and powerful.

=== Awards ===
- Best Documentary at the 4th Annual Baltimore International Black Film Festival (2017, won)In 2017 the film screened at the 4th Annual Baltimore International Black Film Festival, where it received an award for Best Documentary.

== See also ==
- Civil rights movement in popular culture
- List of black films of the 2010s
