= Heritage Film Project =

Coordinates: 38°01′48″N 78°28′44″W

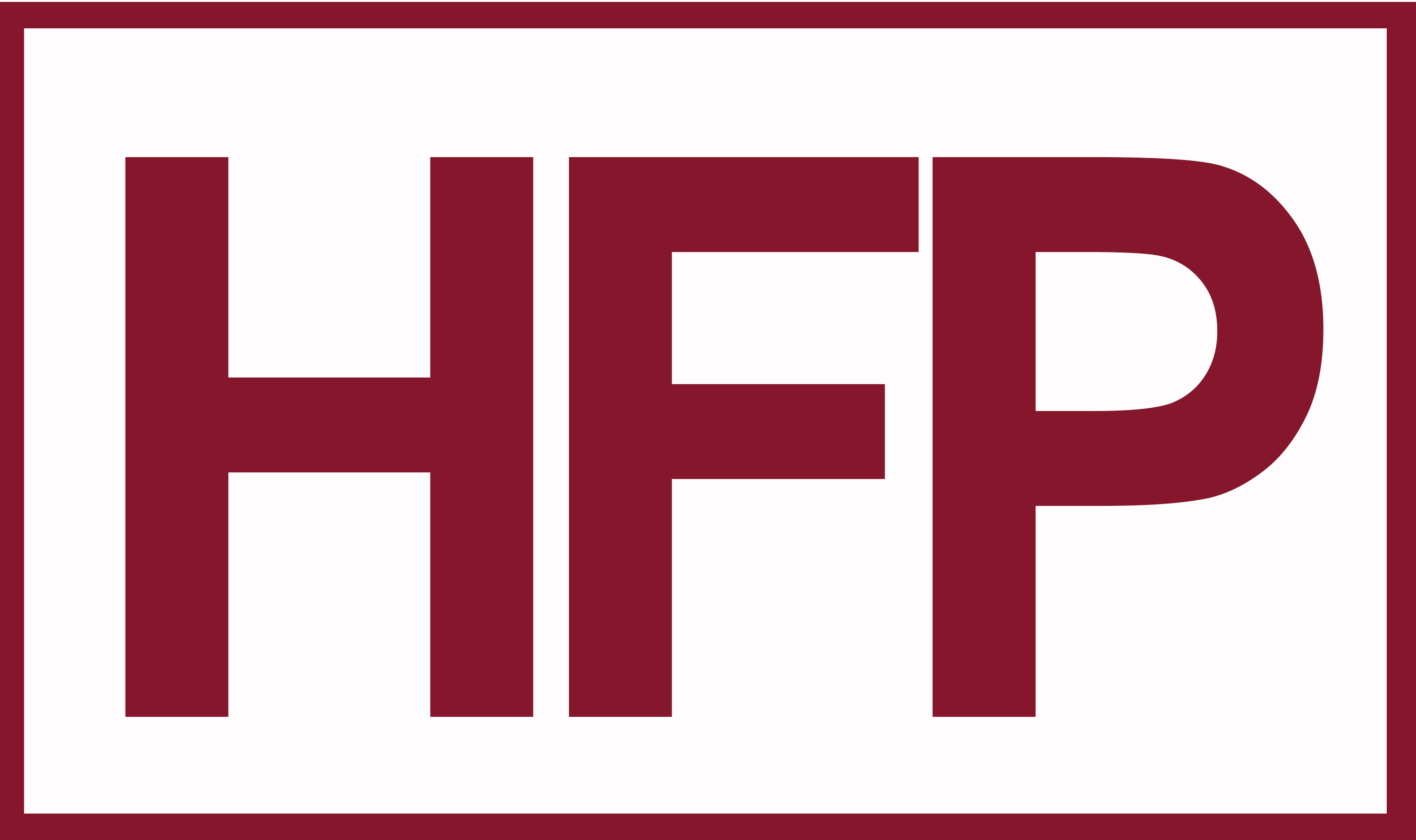
- Industry: Film production and distribution
- Predecessor: Patagonia Film Group; Verbum; Contrakultura Films
- Founded: 18 December 2008; 17 years ago
- Founder: Eduardo Montes-Bradley and Soledad Liendo
- Headquarters: Charlottesville, New York City
- Area served: Worldwide
- Key people: Eduardo Montes-Bradley, Soledad Liendo
- Products: Documentary Films
- Website: heritagefilmproject.com

Heritage Film Project is a film-production and distribution studio established in Charlottesville. It was founded by Eduardo Montes-Bradley and Soledad Liendo.

Heritage Film Project produces documentaries on the arts, science and the humanities with the philanthropic support of the Documentary Film Fund and institutional support of the University of Virginia, National Trust for Historic Preservation, James Madison's Montpelier, UCLA and Columbus Citizens Foundation, and others. Recent films include Daniel Chester French: American Sculptor, The Other Madisons Julian Bond: Reflections from the Frontlines of the Civil Rights Movement, Rita Dove: An American Poet, and White: A Season in the Life of John Borden Evans.

Their lineup of documentary films includes The University of Virginia Collection, Biographies, and The Latin American Collection. Heritage Film Project documentaries are mainly distributed through Kanopy, and Alexander Street Press, also available from "Filmakers Library", Vimeo on Demand, and Amazon. Heritage Film Project also produces documentaries and photographic work on demand for organizations such as James Madison's Montpelier, UNESCO and a select number of individuals.

== University of Virginia collection ==
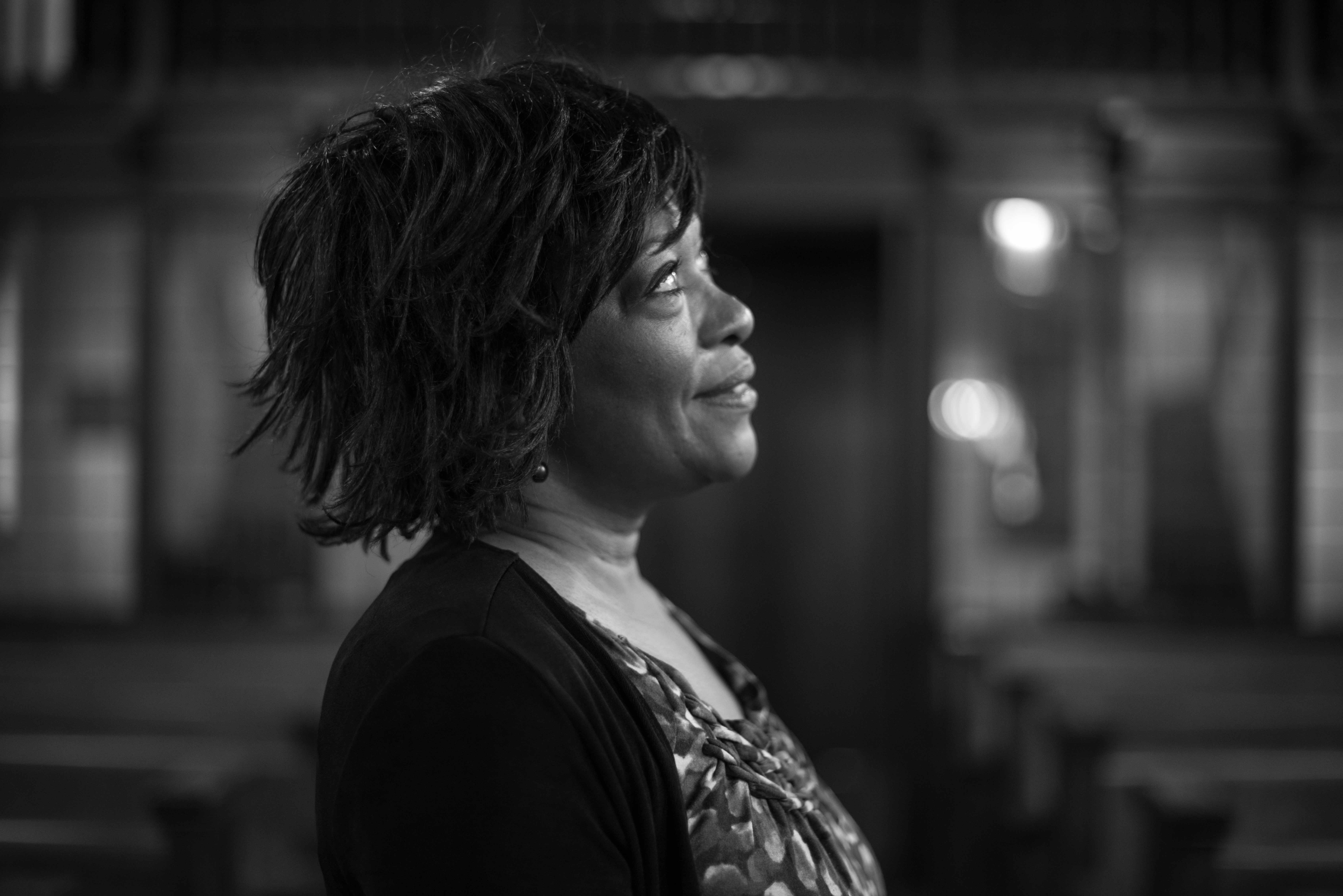
Rita Dove

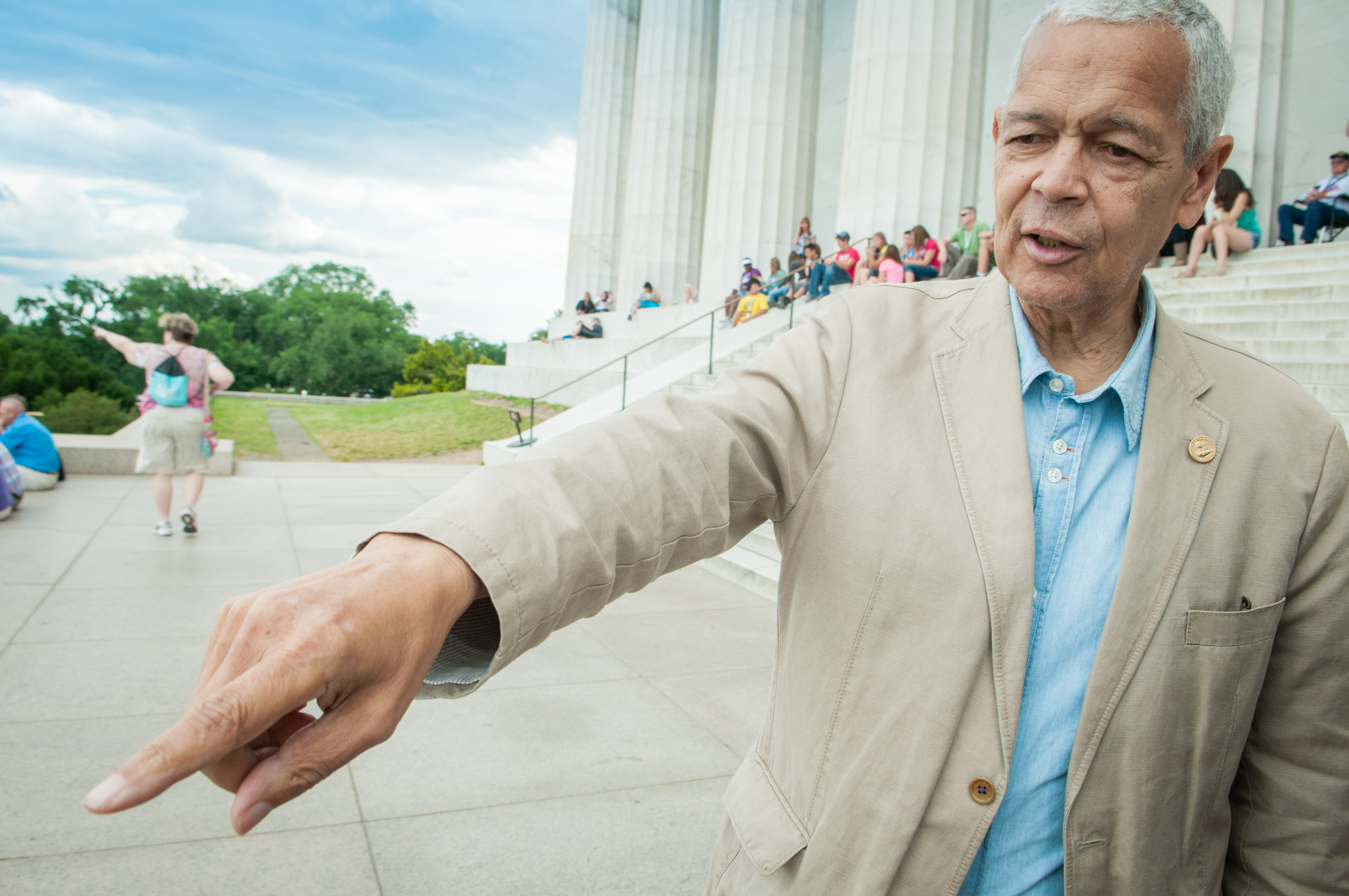
Julian Bond

Heritage Film Project has produced films and a photographic archive on the lives of research and faculty members at the University of Virginia. These films have enjoyed a variety of distribution channels, and the images produced have been included in the permanent collection of the Claude Moore Health Science Library and other archive resources. The collection of films includes interviews with, Teresa A. Sullivan, Jared Loewenstein, Julian Bond, Larry Sabato, Raul Baragiola, Rita Dove, and others. Many of the biographical sketches resulting from these interviews have premiered on PBS affiliates such as WHTJ, are available throughout social media, while public performance rights are licensed through Alexander Street Press. In 2015, in association with the School of Education and Human Development (formerly the Curry School of Education), and the Brown College, Heritage Film Project was awarded a grant in the amount of $85,000.00 to produce Monroe Hill, a one-hour documentary on the life of James Monroe during the period in which he occupied his first farm in Albemarle County.

=== Selected titles ===
Films
Year	Title	Notes
2026	The Art of Joy Brown	The Journey of a world renown ceramist and sculptor, from Wakayama, Japan to Kent Connecticut.
2025	The Piccirilli Factor	On the Italian family of sculptors who revolutionize public art in America. Distributed by Kanopy Streaming.
2022	Daniel Chester French	Biographical Essay on the American Sculptor. Distributed by Kanopy Streaming.
2022	Black Fiddlers	From plantation life to emancipation. Distributed by Kanopy Streaming.
2021	Alice Parker	Best Documentary, Mistic Film Festival 2021 Distributed by Kanopy Streaming.
2021	Buscando a Tabernero	Premiered at the 34th Mar del Plata International Film Festival.
2020	The Other Madisons	The African American descendants of President Madison at Montpelier, VA. Distributed by Kanopy Streaming.
2020	A Soldier's Dream	An American pacifist at the Battle of the Bulge Distributed by Kanopy Streaming.
2019	White: A Season in the Life of John Borden Evans	
2019	Unearthed and Understood	
2019	Norman Kloker	Produced in Association with Rotary Club Charlottesville, Virginia.
2017	The Gillenwater Story	Life of Jay Y. Gillenwater.
2015	Lankes: Yankee Printmaker in Virginia	Produced with the support of the University of Richmond. Distributed by Kanopy Streaming.
2014	Monroe Hill	Produced with the support of the Jeffers Trust at the University of Virginia. Distributed by Kanopy Streaming.
2014	Baragiola	Portrait of Raul Baragiola. Produced with the support of the University of Virginia.
2013	Rita Dove	Distributed by Kanopy Streaming.
2013	Carola Saavedra	Premiere October 9, 2013, Frankfurt International Book Fair. Shot in Berlin and Rio de Janeiro.
2012	Adriana Lisboa	PBS (WHTJ / WCVE Virginia; Rocky Mountain PBS). Italian premiere Festivaletteratura, Mantua, September 5, 2014. Heritage Film Project + Writers Made in Brazil. Brazilian Ministry of External Relations.
2012	Julian Bond	Presented at The British Academy. Distributed by Kanopy Streaming.
2010–2017	The Faculty	Series of biographical documentaries. 30 episodes. Produced in association with the University of Virginia.
2010	Andres Waissman	WPBT Channel 2 (PBS), November 23, 2010. Theatrical premiere at MALBA.
2010	Humberto Calzada	Theatrical premiere January 7, 2010, Tower Theatre. WPBT Channel 2 (PBS). Distributed by Kanopy Streaming.
2010	Children of the Forest	United States Holocaust Museum. Distributed by Alexander Street Press. Distributed by Kanopy Streaming.
2010	Loewenstein	Curator of the Jorge Luis Borges Collection, University of Virginia Library.
2008	Evita: The Documentary	Distributed by Kanopy Streaming.
2008	The Harp of Iwo Jima	Library of Congress / Veterans Heritage Project. United States Holocaust Museum. Distributed by Alexander Street Press and Kanopy.
2007	El gran simulador	
2006	Che: Rise and Fall	Distributed by Kanopy Streaming.
2005	Samba on your Feet	60 min. Rio International Film Festival, 2005. Distributed by Kanopy Streaming.
2005	Pérez Celis	INCAA. Filmed in Little Haiti.

=== External links ===
- Official Website
- IMDB
- School of Medicine Home Page
- UVA - Department of Urology YouTube Channel
- Vimeo Album of films produced by UVA - Department of Urology on Research and Clinical Faculty
- / Facebook Official Site
