= Evita (2008 film) =

- Directed by: Eduardo Montes-Bradley
- Written by: Eduardo Montes-Bradley
- Produced by: Heritage Film Project
- Narrated by: Taylor Johnson
- Edited by: Eduardo Montes-Bradley
- Music by: Various
- Distributed by: Kanopy, Alexander Street Press
- Release date: April 6, 2008
- Running time: 60 minutes
- Country: United States
- Language: English
- Budget: $110.000

Evita is a documentary about Eva Duarte. The film was written and directed by Eduardo Montes-Bradley. Conformed in its entirety with previously unseen historical footage and documents, the documentary reconstructs the life of former Argentine first lady from a neutral perspective.

The film starts with an examination of Evita Duarte's origins, her relationship with her parents (particularly her father) and siblings. Evita approaches intimate aspects of Duarte's early childhood and adolescence, leading to her resolving to flee her home in the countryside for the capital city of Buenos Aires. The latter segments of the film are highlighted by interviews with former teachers from her elementary schooling in Junin. The film reminds the audience of the domestic and international context from which Evita Duarte emerged, enhancing the viewer's understanding of the facts. The second act of the film concludes with her funeral in Buenos Aires. The third act exposes the macabre plot to have Evita Peron's corpse disappear, looking at the curious series of events leading to the exchange of corpses between the Peronist youth and the military regime.

Evita premiered in the US on WCVE Richmond-PBS, and WHTJ Charlottesville-PBS on July 12, 2012. Evita has been included in courses on Political Science and History. Most recently, the documentary was listed 11 in the “Top 25 Political Documentaries That Shed Light On Latin America’s Reality"

== Film festivals ==
Evita was screened at the Virginia Film Festival, in Charlottesville, on November 4, 2011.
