= Luis Sepúlveda =

Chilean writer (1949–2020)

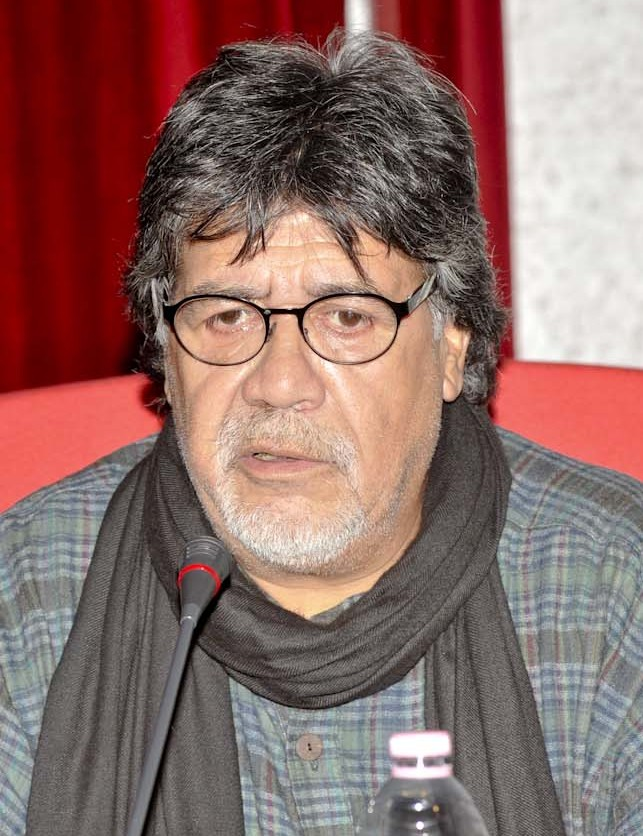
- Sepúlveda in 2014
- Born: October 4, 1949; Ovalle, Limarí Province, Chile
- Died: April 16, 2020 (aged 70); Oviedo, Asturias, Spain
- Education: University of Chile
- Occupations: Writer, journalist

Luis Sepúlveda Calfucura (Spanish pronunciation: [ˈlwis seˈpulβeða kalfuˈkuɾa]; October 4, 1949 – April 16, 2020) was a Chilean writer and journalist. A communist militant and fervent opponent of Augusto Pinochet's regime, he was imprisoned and tortured by the military dictatorship during the 1970s. Sepúlveda authored numerous poetry books and short stories; in addition to Spanish, his mother tongue, he also spoke English, the language in which he wrote his first novel, El viejo que leía novelas de amor (The Old Man Who Read Love Stories).

== Biography ==
Luis Sepúlveda was born in Ovalle, Limarí Province, Chile in 1949. His father, José Sepúlveda, was a militant of the Chilean Communist Party; and his mother, Irma Calfucura, was a nurse of Mapuche descent. After High School in Santiago, he studied theatre production at the National University of Chile.

He joined the Communist Party when he was 12 years old, and expelled from it in 1968.

Luis Sepúlveda was politically active first as a leader of the student movement and in the Salvador Allende administration in the department of cultural affairs where he was in charge of a series of cheap editions of classics for the general public. He also acted as a mediator between the government and Chilean companies.

After the Chilean coup of 1973 which brought to power General Augusto Pinochet he was jailed for two-and-a-half years and then obtained a conditional release through the efforts of the German branch of Amnesty International and was kept under house arrest.

He managed to escape and went underground for nearly a year. With the help of a friend who was head of the Alliance française in Valparaíso he set up a drama group that became the first cultural focus of resistance. He was rearrested and given a life sentence (later reduced to twenty-eight years) for treason and subversion.

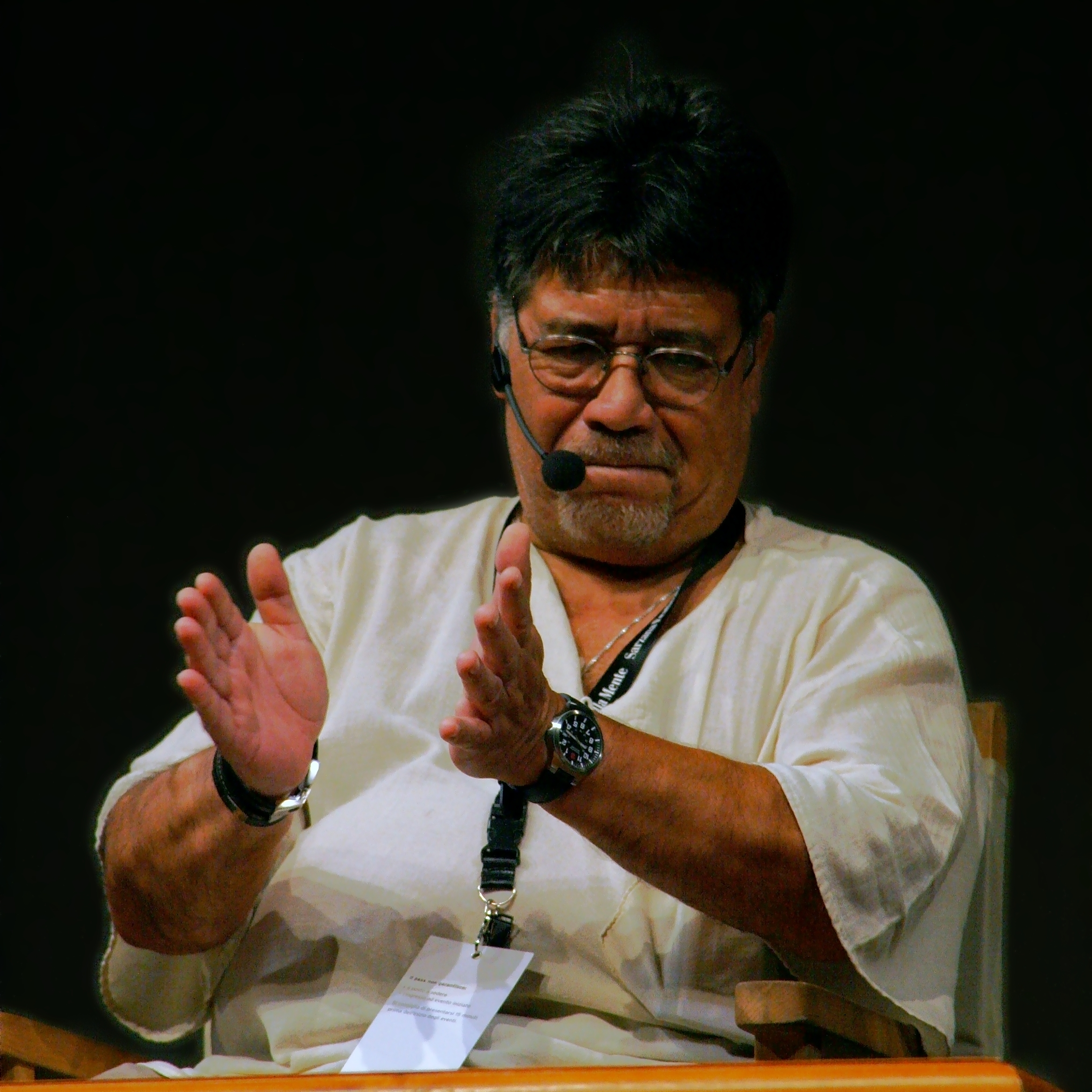
Luis Sepúlveda in 2009

The German section of Amnesty International intervened again and his prison sentence was commuted to eight years of exile, and in 1977 he left Chile to fly to Sweden where he was supposed to teach Spanish literature. At the first stopover in Buenos Aires he escaped and managed to enter Uruguay. Because the political situations in both Argentina and Uruguay were similar to those in his home country, Sepúlveda went to São Paulo in Brazil and then to Paraguay. He had to leave again because of the local regime and finally settled in Quito in Ecuador guest of his friend Jorge Enrique Adoum. He directed the Alliance Française theatre, founded a theatrical company and took part in a UNESCO expedition to assess the impact of colonization on the Shuar people.

During the expedition he shared the life of the Shuars for seven months and came to an understanding of Latin America as a multicultural and multilingual continent where the Marxism he was taught was not applicable to a rural population that was dependent on its surrounding natural environment. He worked in close contact with organizations of the Indigenous people and drafted the first literacy teaching plan for the Imbabura peasants' federation, in the Andes.

In 1979, he joined the Simón Bolívar International Brigade which was fighting in Nicaragua and after the victory of the revolution he started working as a journalist and one year later he left for Europe.

He went to Hamburg in Germany because of his admiration of German literature (he learned the language in prison) especially the romantics such as Novalis and Friedrich Hölderlin and worked there as journalist traveling widely in Latin America and Africa.

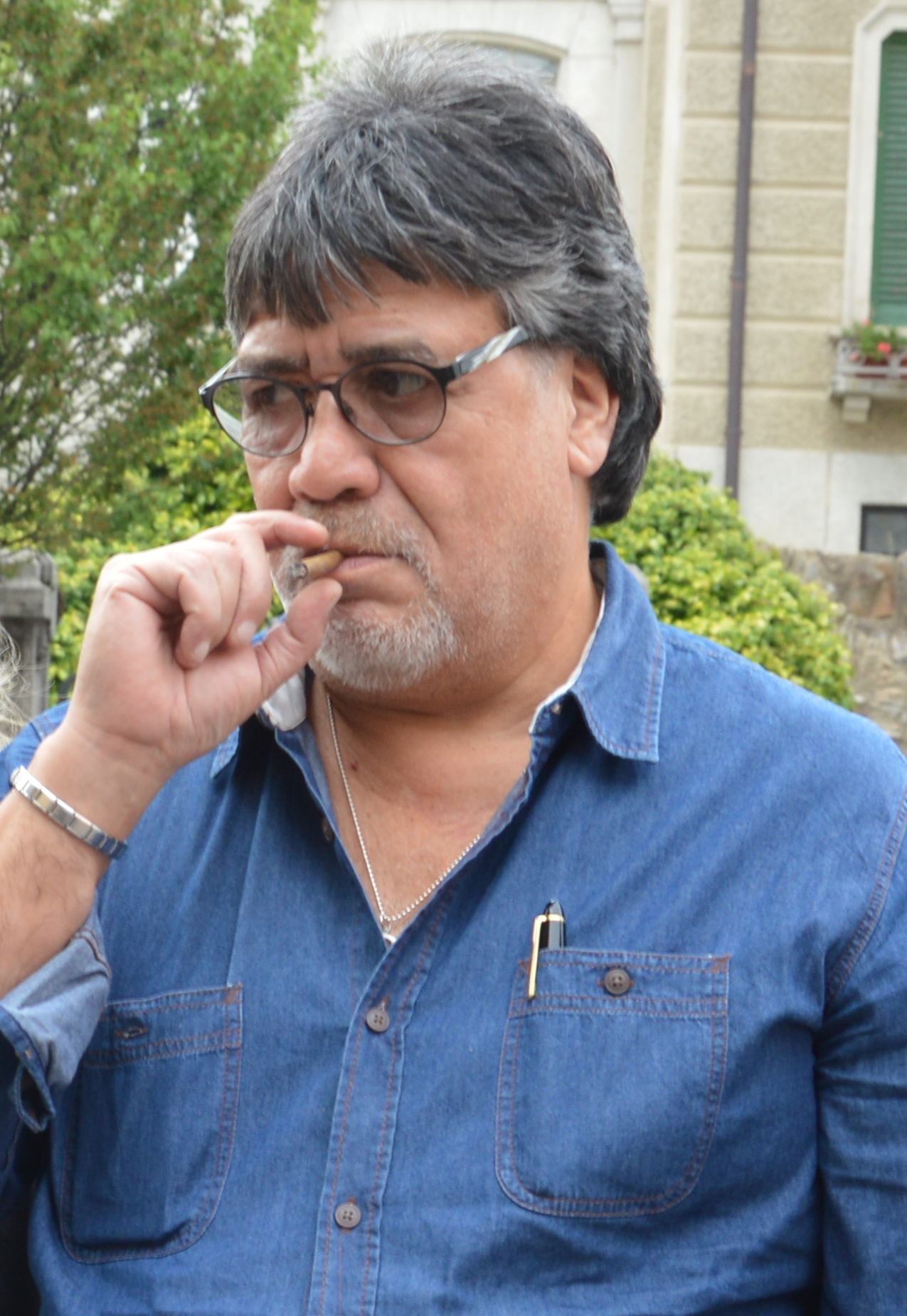
Sepúlveda in Italy, 2013

In 1982, he came in contact with Greenpeace and worked until 1987 as a crew member on one of their ships. He later acted as coordinator between various branches of the organization. His environmental activism then continued after he left Greenpeace. For example, he was a strong advocate for environmental protection in his beloved Patagonia, the subject of some of his most popular works.

In 1988 he won the Tigre Juan Award for his novel Un viejo que leía novelas de amor, and in 2009 he won the Premio Primavera de Novela for his novel La sombra de lo que fuimos. He wrote novels, children's books, and travel guides. He was also a film writer and director.

On March 1, 2020, after returning from a conference in Portugal, he was confirmed as the first man in the Asturias region of Spain to be infected by COVID-19. By March 11, it was reported that Sepúlveda was in critical condition, that he was in an induced coma with assisted breathing due to multiple organ failure in an Oviedo hospital. He died on April 16 due to the virus.

Sepúlveda had six children, one girl and five boys, three of them born during his time in Hamburg. At the time of his death, he was married to the Chilean poet Carmen Yáñez; they had married in 1968, separated in 1971, resumed their life together in 1997 and remarried in 2004. She has written a book about their life together, Un amore fuori dal tempo – La mia vita con Lucho.

== Critical reception ==
Sepúlveda's work has received particular attention for its contributions to discussions of environmental issues in Latin America. Laura Barbas-Rhoden contends that The Old Man Who Read Love Stories critiques environmentally destructive neocolonial modernization schemes. Scott M. DeVries asserts that several moments in The Old Man Who Read Love Stories "articulate an environmentalist ideology from the perspective of the Spanish American novela de la selva." Jonathan Tittler compares the environmental ethics and narrative structure of The Old Man Who Read Love Stories with Mario Vargas Llosa's The Storyteller. Juan Gabriel Araya Grandón describes Sepúlveda's 1994 novel Mundo del fin del mundo (World at the End of the World) as an eco-narrative based on a critical discourse that addresses the fundamental tension between environmentalist and extractivist forces. Adrian Taylor Kane argues that The Old Man Who Read Love Stories and World at the End of the World undermine the Eurocentric notion of modernity proffered by Domingo Faustino Sarmiento in his 1845 treatise Civilización y barbarie o vida de Juan Facundo Quiroga by ironically inverting Sarmiento's concept of civilization and barbarism.

== Books ==
- Crónica de Pedro Nadie (1969; English title: Chronicle of Pedro Nobody)
- Los miedos, las vidas, las muertes y otras alucinaciones (1986; Fear, Life, Death, and other Hallucinations)
- Cuaderno de viaje (1987; Travel Log)
- Mundo del Fin del Mundo (1989; The World at the End of the World)
- Un viejo que leía novelas de amor (1989; The Old Man Who Read Love Stories)
- La frontera extraviada (1994; The Lost Frontier)
- Nombre de torero (1994; The Name of a Bullfighter)
- Al andar se hace el camino se hace el camino al andar (1995; Patagonia Express)
- Historia de una gaviota y del gato que le enseñó a volar (1996; The Story of a Seagull and the Cat Who Taught Her to Fly, 2003)
- Historias marginales (2000)
- Hot line (2002)
- La locura de Pinochet y otros artículos (2002)
- Cuaderno de viaje
- Diario de un killer sentimental seguido de Yacaré
- Komplot: Primera parte de una antología irresponsable
- Los peores cuentos de los hermanos Grim (with Mario Delgado Aparaín, 2004)
- Patagonia Express (2004)
- La sombra de lo que fuimos (2009; The Shadow of What We Were, 2010)

== Filmography ==
- Vivir a los 17, 1986 director and writer
- Lucky and Zorba, 1998 writer
- Tierra del fuego, 2000 screenplay
- The Old Man Who Read Love Stories, 2001 writer
- Nowhere, 2002 director and writer
- Corazón verde, 2002 writer

== Documentaries ==
- Eduardo Montes-Bradley (1999). Harto The Borges (Feature Documentary). U.S.: Patagonia Film Group, U.S.
