= Searching-4 Tabernero =

2020 documentary film by Eduardo Montes-Bradley

- Spanish: Buscando a Tabernero
- Directed by: Eduardo Montes-Bradley
- Written by: Eduardo Montes-Bradley
- Produced by: Henry Weinschenk, Eduardo Montes-Bradley, Soledad Liendo, Rodolfo Durán
- Narrated by: Eduardo Montes-Bradley
- Edited by: Eduardo Montes-Bradley
- Music by: Eduardo Montes-Bradley, Gabriel Bajarlía
- Production companies: Heritage Film Project, Soy Cine
- Distributed by: Heritage Film Project
- Release date: November 26, 2020 (Argentina)
- Running time: 72 minutes
- Countries: Argentina; United States
- Languages: Spanish; German; English

Searching-4 Taberno (Spanish: Buscando a Tabernero) is a 2020 Argentine-American documentary film directed by Eduardo Montes-Bradley and produced by Heritage Film Project.

The film traces the origins of German cinematographer Peter Paul Weinschenk before he arrived in Buenos Aires in October 1937 after four years as a cameraman in Madrid and Barcelona. Once in Argentina, Weinschenk enjoyed great success under the pseudo-name Pablo Tabernero. Tabernero is a literal translation from German of Weinschenk.

Searching-4 Taberno premiered at the 34th annual Mar del Plata International Film Festival, on November 26, 2020.

== Synopsis ==
Peter Weinschenk (1910-1996) was a distinguished director of photography better known as Pablo Tabernero. Shortly before his death in 1996, he began writing an unfinished biography titled "Scenes in the Life of a Wandering Jew." This evocative title inspired filmmaker Montes-Bradley to embark on a journey retracing Weinschenk's remarkable path—from Berlin during the Weimar Republic, to Barcelona amid the Spanish Civil War, and finally to Argentina during the era of Evita and Juan Perón, where he adopted the artistic name Tabernero. What begins as research evolves into an obsession for Montes-Bradley, a quest that ultimately leads to New York, where Weinschenk spent his final years.

== Development ==
Searching-4 Tabernero was filmed in Berlin, Trouville-sur-Mer, Barcelona, Madrid, New York, Charlottesville, Buenos Aires, and Mendoza.

== Reception ==
La Nación and Caligari both reviewed the movie favorably, the former calling it a tribute to Weinschenk. Ámbito also gave Searching-4 Tabernero a favorable review, stating that the movie left them wanting to know more.
