= Smuggler's Gold =

Smuggler's Gold may refer to:

- Smuggler's Gold (film), 1951 American adventure film directed by William Berke
- Smuggler's Gold, the fourth book in the Merovingen Nights series by C. J. Cherryh
