= Daniel Chester French: American Sculptor =

- Directed by: Eduardo Montes-Bradley
- Starring: Adrian Benepe; Harold Holzer; Thayer Tolles; Michele Bogart; Richard Guy Wilson
- Cinematography: Eduardo Montes-Bradley
- Production company: Heritage Film Project
- Release date: May 26, 2022
- Running time: 60 minutes

Daniel Chester French: American Sculptor is a 2022 documentary film by Eduardo Montes-Bradley about Daniel Chester French, a leading American sculptor best known for his rendering of the seated President Abraham Lincoln at the Lincoln Memorial in Washington, D.C. Produced by Heritage Film Project with the support of the National Trust for Historic Preservation and Chesterwood. Significant support for this film came from the Morris and Alma Schapiro Fund.

== Synopsis ==
Daniel Chester French: American Sculptor is written and directed by filmmaker Eduardo Montes-Bradley. The film follows the sculptor from childhood on a farm in New Hampshire to a place of prominence amongst the leading artists of his generation in New York.

Daniel Chester French: American Sculptor recognizes for the first time the contributions of the Piccirilli Brothers to all but two works created by Daniel Chester French in marble and stone. Other aspects of Daniel Chester French included in this documentary are Chesterwood, the sculptor's home studio from 1896 to 1931, the Alexander Hamilton U.S. Custom House, Alma Mater, John Boyle O'Reilly Memorial, Standing Lincoln at the Nebraska State Capitol, The Spirit of Life, and the Marquis de Lafayette in Prospect Park, Brooklyn.

=== Plot ===
Daniel Chester French: American Sculptor pays attention to the artist's relationship with Ralph Waldo Emerson in Concord, and to French's The Minute Man, a first commission for a monument created in 1874 to commemorate the centenary of U.S. independence. Following the installation of French's first monument, the director explores French's connection to Thomas Ball in Florence and his early achievements upon his return to the United States, among which the statue of the seated Abraham Lincoln standing inside the Lincoln Memorial stands above all previous works as a universal symbol of American democracy.

== Availability == Alexander Street

== Cast ==
- Harold Holzer
- Daniel Preston
- Michael Richman
- Thayer Tolles
- Richard Guy Wilson
- Michael Richman
- Michele Bogart
- Adrian Benepe
- William Sherman
- Eve Kahn
- David Dearinger
- Judith Shea

== Year of release ==
Daniel Chester French: American Sculptor premiered on May 26, 2022, at the Mahaiwe Performing Arts Center in Great Barrington, Massachusetts.
