= Chesterwood (Massachusetts) =

Historic house in Massachusetts, United States

- U.S. National Register of Historic Places
- U.S. National Historic Landmark District
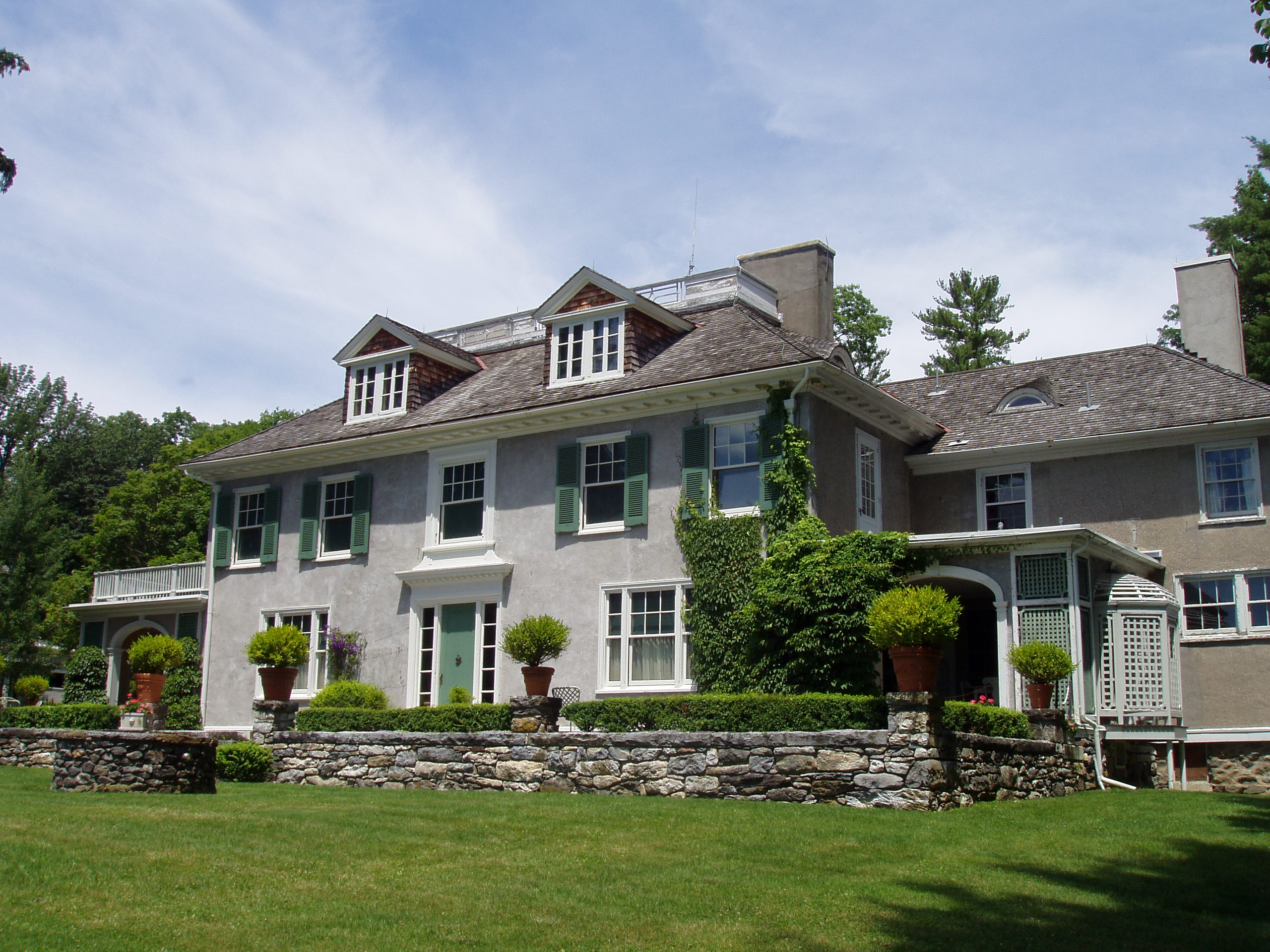
- Chesterwood

- Location within Massachusetts Location within the United States
- Nearest city: Stockbridge, Massachusetts
- Coordinates: 42.2851°N 73.3523°W
- Area: 129 acres (52 ha)
- Built: 1896
- Architect: Henry Bacon, Daniel Chester French
- Architectural style: Colonial Revival
- NRHP reference No.: 66000652

Significant dates
- Added to NRHP: October 15, 1966
- Designated NHLD: December 21, 1965

Chesterwood was the summer estate and studio of American sculptor Daniel Chester French (1850–1931) located at 4 Williamsville Road in Stockbridge, Massachusetts. Most of French's originally 150-acre (61 ha) estate is now owned by the National Trust for Historic Preservation, which operates the property as a museum and sculpture garden. The property was designated a National Historic Landmark in 1965 in recognition of French's importance in American sculpture.

== History ==
In 1896 Daniel Chester French purchased the 150-acre (61 ha) farm of Marshall Warner in Stockbridge, Massachusetts, to house a summer estate and studio space. At this time, French had already achieved national notice, primarily for his bronze The Minute Man statue, commissioned in 1873 and placed at the Old North Bridge in Concord, Massachusetts, in 1875. Following his purchase of the farm, French had a studio built on the property, to a design by his friend Henry Bacon, near the c. 1820 farmhouse. This space would become French's primary studio space for the rest of his working career, even though he divided his time between Stockbridge and New York City.

In 1901 French hired Bacon to design a replacement for the farmhouse, the Georgian Revival structure now standing on the estate. His fame as a sculptor was cemented when he was chosen to provide the massive statue of Abraham Lincoln which stands in the Lincoln Memorial in Washington, DC. Although the final carving of this massive work was not done at Chesterwood, French did his preliminary design work here, which included the construction of a 6-foot (1.8 m) scale model.

After French's death in 1931, Chesterwood passed to his daughter, Margaret French Cresson. She formed the Daniel Chester French Foundation to manage 79 acres (32 ha) of the property, including the main house and studio, while retaining the rest of the property for herself. Following a brief period of ownership by The Trustees of Reservations, the 79-acre parcel was acquired by the National Trust for Historic Preservation. The National Trust was bequested another 50 acres (20 ha) of the estate by Cresson.

It was declared a National Historic Landmark in 1965, and listed on the National Register of Historic Places the following year. It is open for tours from late May through mid-October; admission is charged.

== Description ==
The estate covers 129 acres (52.2 ha) of forest and field in the Taconic Mountains, in the heart of the cultural region of the Berkshires. Most of the estate's buildings are clustered on the north side of Williamsville Road, including the house, studio, a 19th-century barn which has been adapted as a museum gallery and visitor center, and other small outbuildings. On the south side of the road are a c. 1860 farmhouse, adapted for use as a caretaker's residence, and a smaller studio space built by French to escape the sometimes busy atmosphere in the main studio. A path meanders through the woods to the north, which was supposedly used by French, and which is now seasonally decorated with sculpture by currently-active artists.

The main block of the studio is essentially a cube 30 feet (9.1 m) on each side, and enormous doors 30 feet (9.1 m) high on the west side. It has a peaked ceiling, with a skylight on the north-facing roof section. A terraced area to the south includes a porch covered by a flat roof supported by Doric columns, and there is a large reception room on the north side where French would entertain clients and friends. This room opens to the east onto a garden with a fountain designed by Henry Bacon. To the west of the studio block is a small chamber from which waste materials from the studio can be dumped to the basement via a chute.

The house is 2 1/2-story Georgian Revival structure. Like the studio, it is finished in a stucco that has been mixed with marble chips to give it texture. It has a hip roof which is topped by a low balustrade, and which is pierced by gable dormers on the front and rear elevations. Open porches are found on both side elevations, and the south-facing front has a broad terrace, providing fine views of the Taconic Mountains. The most notable interior room is French's study, which includes woodwork taken from the Warner farmhouse, and replicating the "best" parlor of his family's homestead in Chester, New Hampshire.

The studio, barn and other gallery spaces include sculptural studies for a number of his works, most notably:

- The Minute Man (1875), Old North Bridge, Concord, Massachusetts
- Equestrian statue of George Washington (1900), Paris
- Four Continents (1906), United States Customs House, New York City
- Samuel F. Dupont Memorial (1921), the fountain at Dupont Circle, Washington, D.C.
- Abraham Lincoln (1922) in the Lincoln Memorial, Washington, D.C.
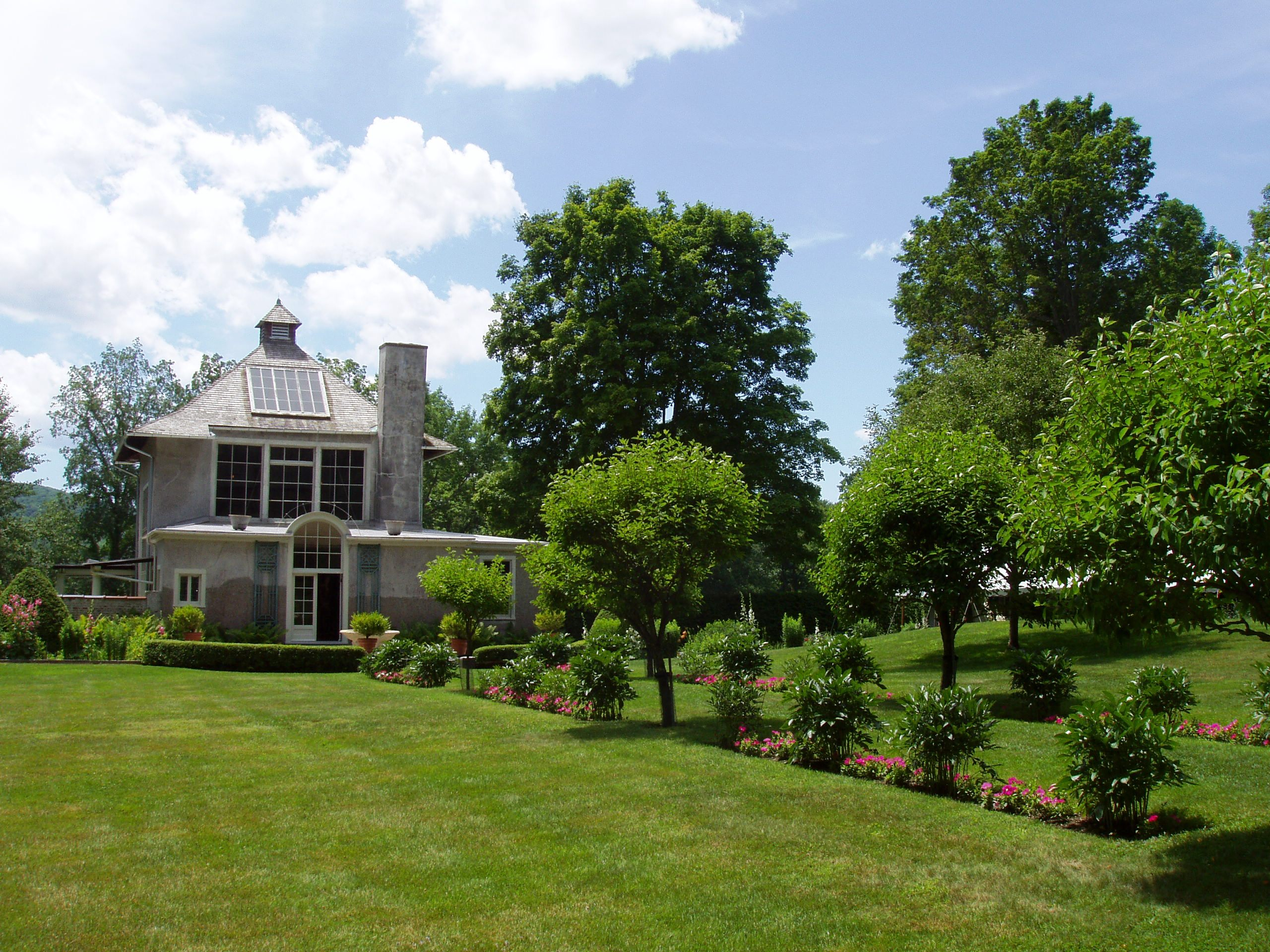
Studio and garden

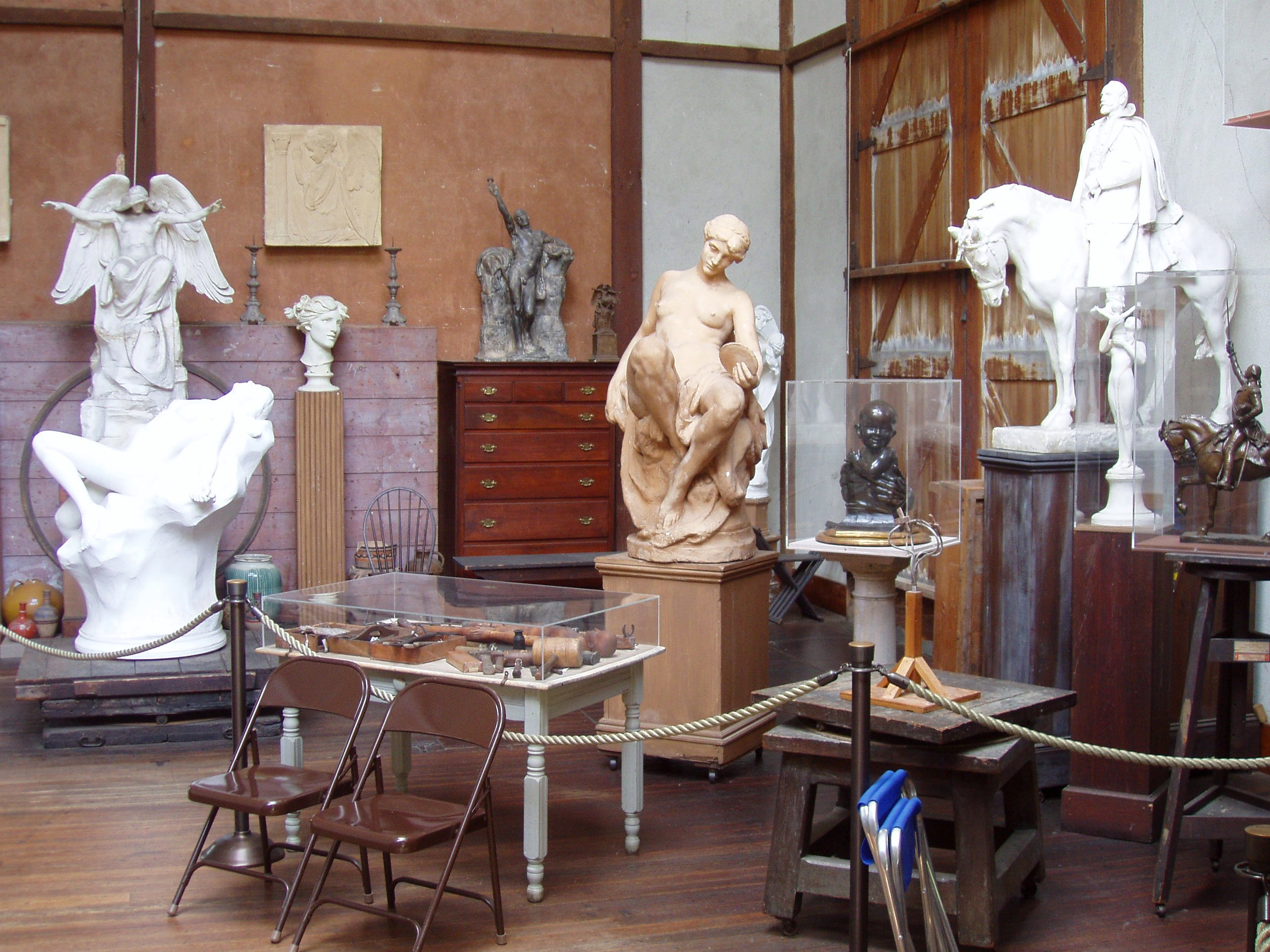
Studio interior

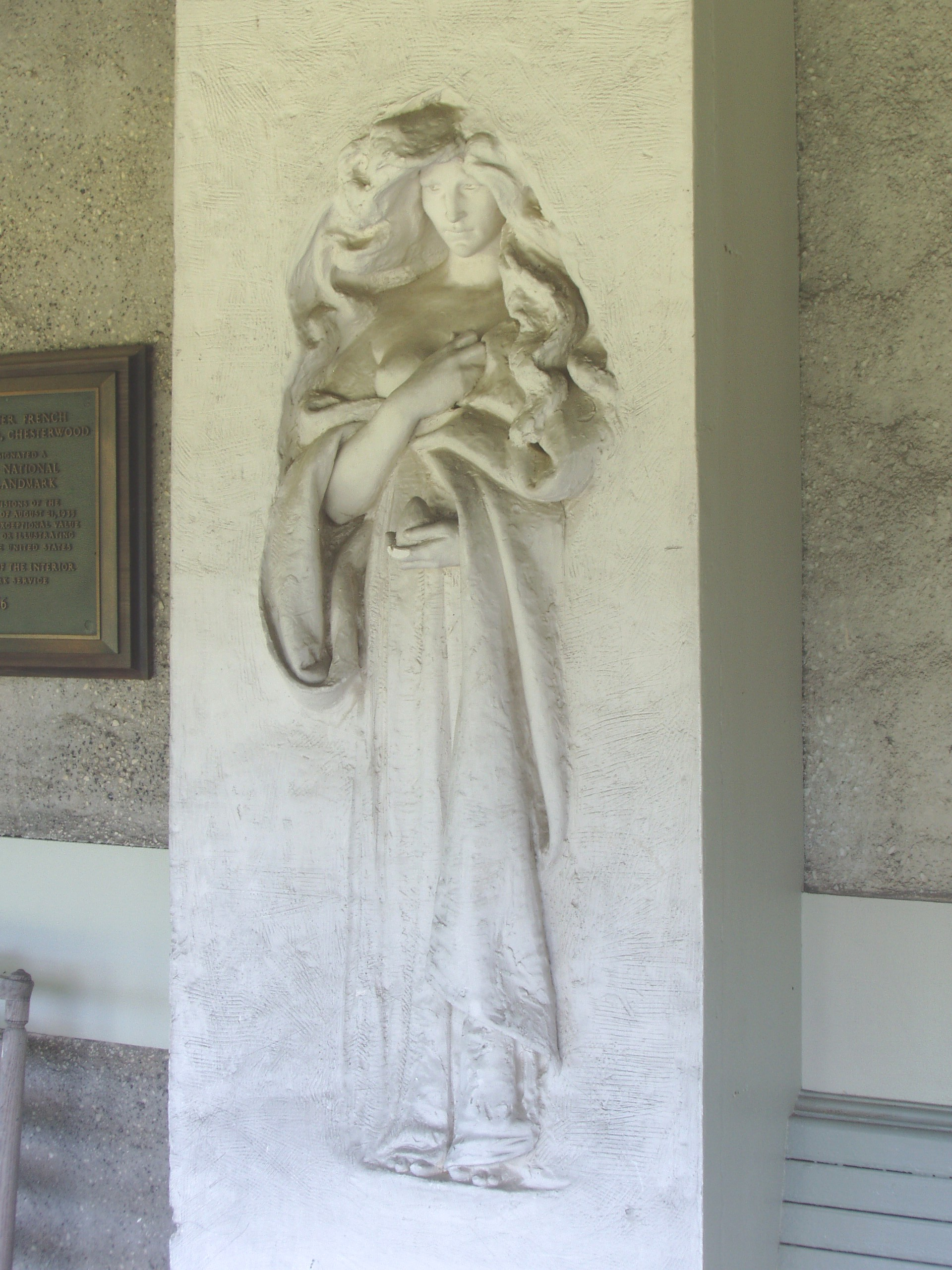
Studio detail

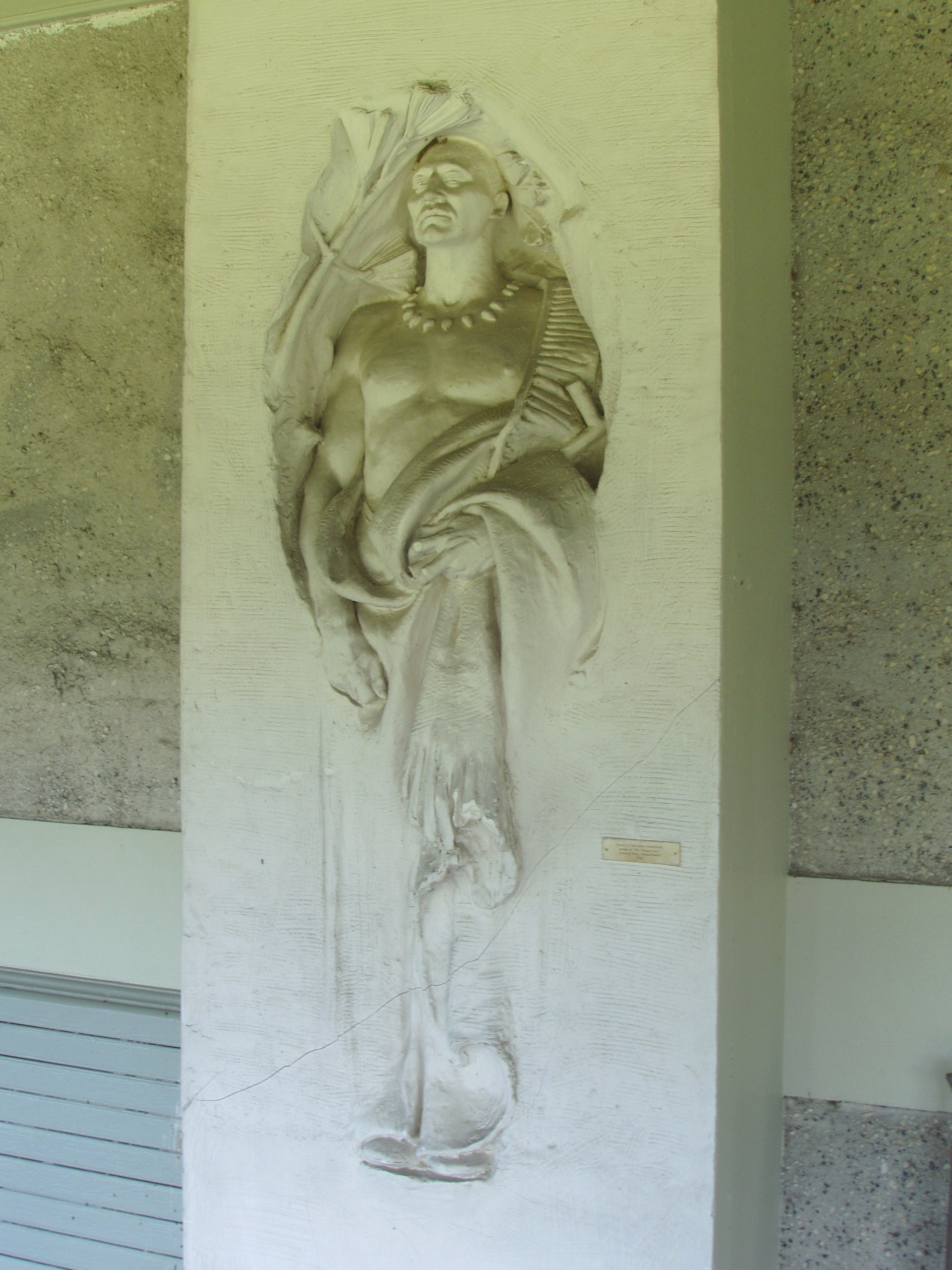
Studio detail

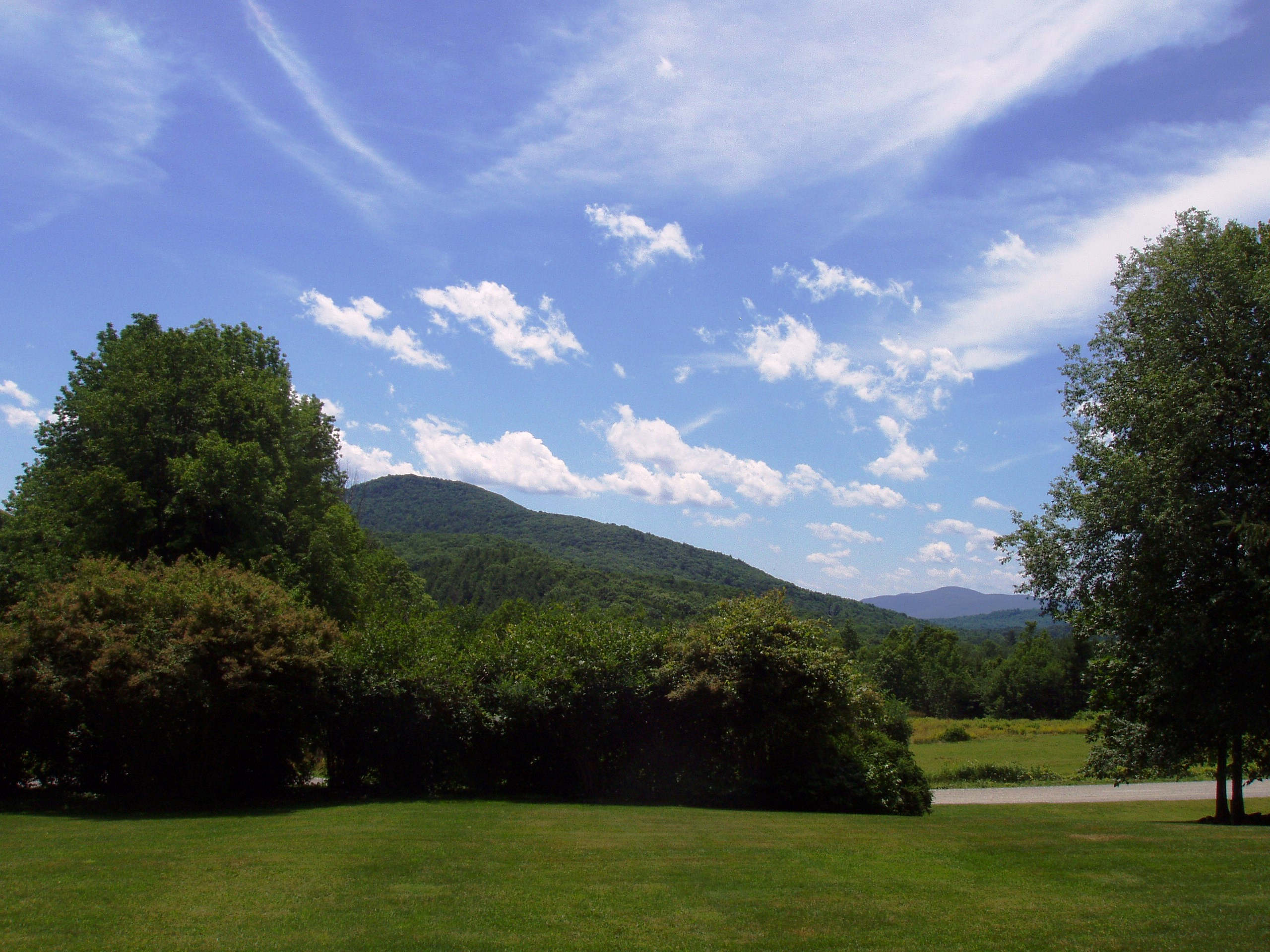
View from house

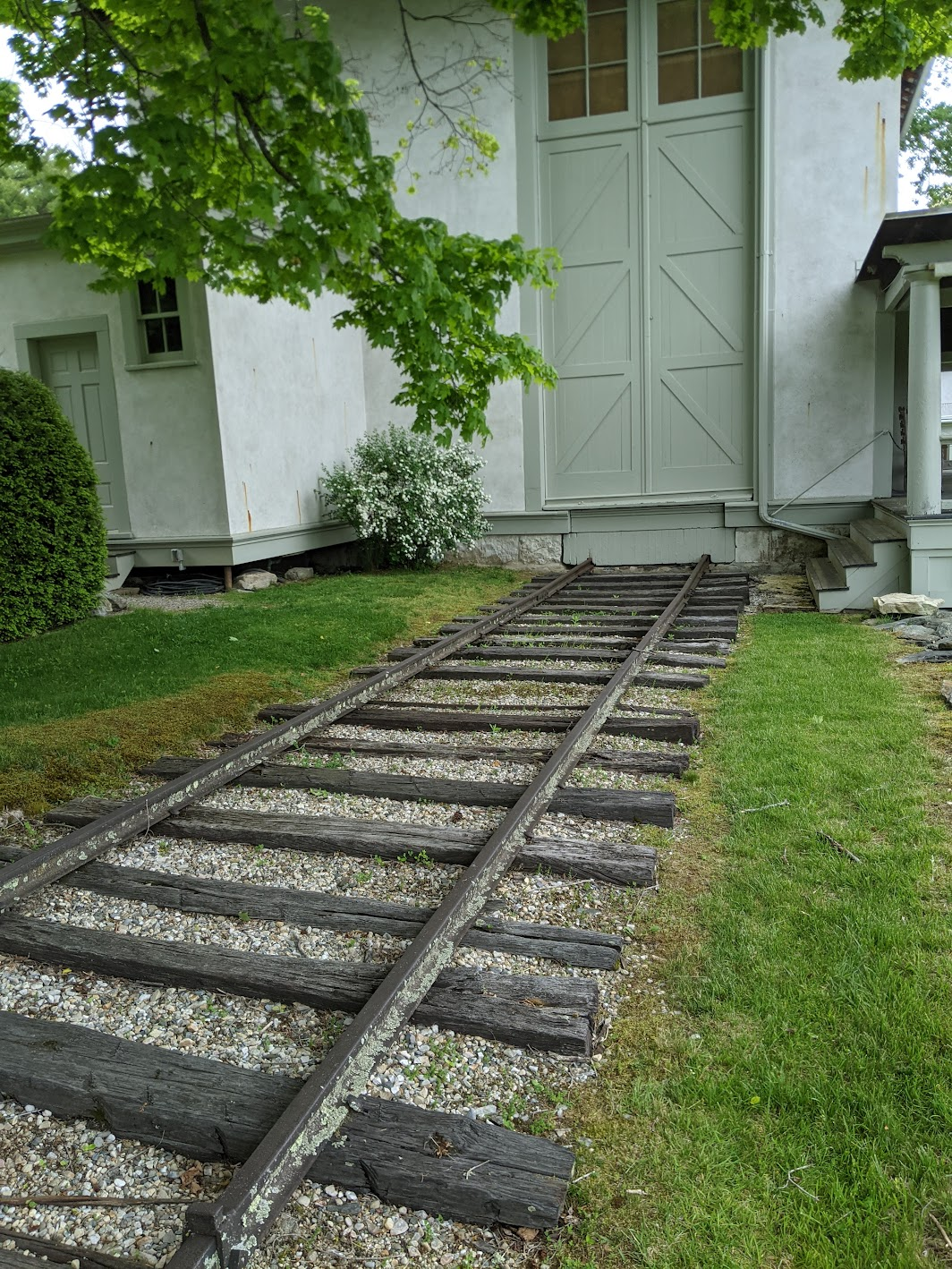
French had tracks installed outside his studio so he could see how his sculptures looked in daylight

== See also ==
- Daniel Chester French: American Sculptor, documentary film by Eduardo Montes-Bradley
- List of National Historic Landmarks in Massachusetts
- List of single-artist museums
- National Register of Historic Places listings in Berkshire County, Massachusetts
- Naumkeag
- The Mount (Lenox, Massachusetts)
- Ventfort Hall Mansion and Gilded Age Museum
