= Héctor Tizón =

Argentine novelist (1930-2012)

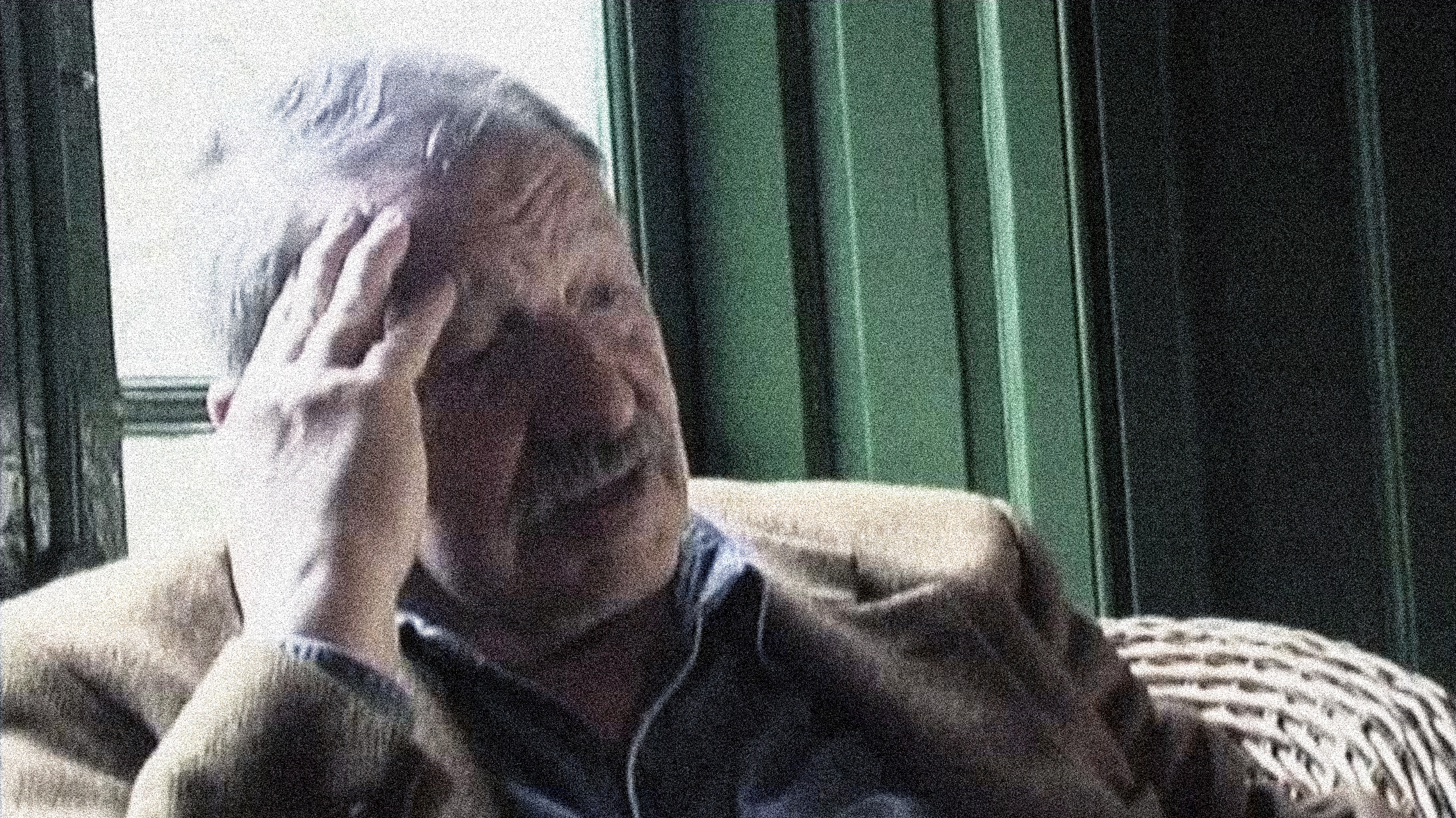
- Born: 30 February 1930; Jujuy, Argentina
- Died: 30 July 2012 (aged 81); Jujuy, Argentina
- Occupations: Writer, translator, diplomat
- Relatives: Konex Award
- Writing career
- Language: Spanish
- Notable works: Fuego en Casabindo; Al costado de los rieles

Héctor Tizón (21 October 1929 – 30 July 2012) was an Argentine writer and diplomat. He lived and worked from the ancestral home of his parents in Yala, a small rural town some 40 miles (64 km) north of San Salvador de Jujuy. Tizón served as the cultural attaché in the Argentine Embassy in Mexico, and was forced into exile to Cercedilla in the Sierra de Guadarrama, west of Madrid, shortly after the military coup of 24 March 1976. Upon his return to Argentina, he settled back in Jujuy where he died on 30 July 2012. He won the Diamond Konex Award in 2004 as one of the most preeminent writers in Argentina.

== Bibliography ==
- A un costado de los rieles (1960)
- Fuego en Casabindo (1969)
- El cantar del profeta y el bandido (1972)
- El jactancioso y la bella (1972)
- Sota de bastos, caballo de espadas (1975)
- El traidor venerado (1978)
- La casa y el viento (1984)
- Recuento (1984)
- El viaje (1988)
- El hombre que llegó a un pueblo (1988)
- El gallo blanco (1992)
- Luz de las crueles provincias (1995)
- La mujer de Strasser (1997)
- Tierra de frontera (1998)
- Obra completa (1998)
- Extraño y pálido fulgor (1999)
- El viejo soldado (2002)
- La belleza del mundo (2004)
- No es posible callar (2004)
- Cuentos completos (2006)
- El resplandor de la hoguera (2008)
- Memorial de la Puna

== External References ==
- Le Mot Just, a documentary film by Eduardo Montes-Bradley
