= The Entertainment Herald =

- April–May 1986 issue
- Associate Editor: Claudia Camps
- Staff writers: Ariel Gomes, Raúl Pérez Arias, Alejandro Chionetti, Marta Santelli, Ricardo Ragendorfer
- Categories: Film Industry
- Frequency: Monthly
- Circulation: 7,000
- Publisher: Eduardo Montes-Bradley, Nelson Montes-Bradley
- First issue: September 1985
- Final issue: October 1986
- Company: The Entertainment Herald
- Country: United States
- Based in: Hollywood, California
- Language: English, Spanish
- OCLC: 801242780

The Entertainment Herald was a bilingual trade publication serving film producers in the United States, and UK, reaching distributors in Spain and Latin America. The first issue appeared in September 1985, the last in October 1986.

== History ==
The Entertainment Herald was founded in 1985 during a worldwide period of expansion of the Home Video markets. The magazine supported itself with advertising revenues. Its editorial offices were located at 6331 Hollywood Blv., Suite 1102, Los Angeles, California. The unique design that characterized The Entertainment Herald is credited to graphic Designer Oscar "Negro" Díaz

== Editorial content ==
The Entertainment Herald featured an array of articles, chronicles, charts, reviews, festival summaries, special reports, as well as interviews to celebrities, producers, directors and distributors such as Jon Voight, Christian Halsey-Solomon, Menahem Golan, Andrew Vajna, Paul Mazursky, Michael Dudikoff, David Brown, Manuel Antin, Krzystof Zanussi, and María Conchita Alonso.

== Staff ==
Eduardo Montes-Bradley and Nelson Montes-Bradley (Publishers), Claudia Camps (Associate Producer), Oscar “Negro” Diaz (Art Director), Sergio Navarro (Production Coordinator). Ariel Gomes, 46-48 Rue Victor Hugo, 93500, Pantin, France (Paris Bureau), Contributors: Eduardo Montes-Bradley, Ariel Gomes, Raúl Pérez Arias, Alejandro Chionetti, Marta Santelli, Ricardo Ragendorfer.

== Distribution ==
The Entertainment Herald was mailed by subscription to television and cable station programmers and heads of acquisitions, Home Video distributors, and a growing number of video stores in Latin America. TEH was also distributed at MIFED (Mercato internazionale del film e del documentario), Cannes Film Festival, MIP TV, American Film Market, Rio Film Festival and had occasional presence at selected Consumer Electronic Shows in New York and Las Vegas.

== Advertising content ==
- The Cannon Group. Los Angeles, California
- Condor Group, A Division of Heron Communications, Inc. Fresno, California
- American Film Marketing Association. Los Angeles, California
- Video Chile S.A. Chile
- Empresa Cinematográfica Lubisar S.A. Perú
- Skouras Pictures. Los Angeles, California
- Pelican Video. Canoga Park, California
- Shapiro Entertainment Worldwide Distribution. Studio City, California
- New World Pictures. Los Angeles, California.
- Tauro Video. Argentina
- Azteca Films, Inc. Hollywood, California
- Madera Cinevideo, Inc. Madera, California
- Arista Films. Encino, California.
- Trans World Entertainment. Middlesex, England
- Magnum Video Tape. Burbank CA
- Profono Internacional Inc., Argentina
- Video Mago, Los Angeles, California
- Dennis Davidson Associates, Ltd. London, England
- Melody Records, Argentina
- Discos CBS International, Mexico
- Inter Pictures Home Entertainment, Corp. New York
- Goldfarb Distributors, Inc. Los Angeles, California
- World Video Marketing, Inc. Beverly Hills, California
- Videoco S.A. Buenos Aires
- South West Record Distributor. San Antonio Texas
- Acuario Distribution, Co. NJ
- San Sebastian International Film Festival. San Sebastian, Spain
- Australian Film Office. Los Angeles, California
- Star Media Sales, Inc. Los Angeles, California
- Latin Home Entertainment, Los Angeles, California
- West Coast Video, Los Angeles, California
- Esmeralda Video Editora EVE. Argentina
- Exhivideo, S.A. Argentina
- Carolco Pictures. Berverly Hills, California
- Clahuen S.A. Argentina
- Cinea Producciones S.A. Argentina
- Noran S.R.L. Argentina
- Hardcore Films & Video. Argentina
- WEA Discos S.R.L. Argentina
- A&M Discos Latino, USA
- Producciones Dawi S.A. Argentina
- Paris Video Home S.A. Argentina
- Ohanian Producciones. Argentina
- Argentina Video Film. Argentina
- Producers International. Van Nuys, California
- Midem. Paris, France.
- Euramco International, Inc. Beverly Hills, California
- Caribe Comunicaciones S.A. Argentina
- Interteve S.R.L. Argentina
- Video Laser Producciones S.R.L. Argentina
- Atlas Home Video Entertainment, Inc. Los Angeles, California
- Producciones Video Home S.R.L. Argentina
- GHB Films S.R.L. Argentina
