= Smuggler's Gold (film) =

1951 film directed by William A. Berke

- Directed by: William Berke
- Written by: Daniel B. Ullman; Al Martin
- Produced by: Milton Feldman
- Starring: Cameron Mitchell; Amanda Blake; Carl Benton Reid
- Cinematography: Allen G. Siegler
- Edited by: Al Clark
- Music by: Mischa Bakaleinikoff
- Production company: Columbia Pictures
- Distributed by: Columbia Pictures
- Release date: May 5, 1951
- Running time: 64 minutes
- Country: United States
- Language: English

Smuggler's Gold is a 1951 American adventure film directed by William Berke and starring Cameron Mitchell, Amanda Blake and Carl Benton Reid.

== Cast ==
- Cameron Mitchell as Mike Sloan
- Amanda Blake as Susan Hodges
- Carl Benton Reid as 'Pop' Hodges
- Peter M. Thompson as Chief Frank Warren
- William 'Bill' Phillips as Chet Blake
- William Forrest as Arthur Rayburn
- Robert B. Williams as Hank Peters
- Harlan Warde as George Brewster
- Paul Campbell as Ensign Davis
- Al Hill as Walt

== Bibliography ==
- Langman, Larry. A Guide to American Crime Films of the Forties and Fifties. Greenwood Press, 1995.
