= Black Fiddlers =

- Directed by: Eduardo Montes-Bradley
- Produced by: Soledad Liendo
- Starring: Rhiannon Giddens; Marshal Wyatt; Kip Lornell; Earl White; David Roberts
- Cinematography: Eduardo Montes-Bradley
- Production company: Heritage Film Project
- Release date: November 2, 2022
- Running time: 60 minutes

Black Fiddlers is an American documentary film released in 2022 exploring the legacy of violin players of African descent in shaping American folk music and culture. The film is directed by Eduardo Montes-Bradley and produced by the Heritage Film Project. The documentary aimed to be a comprehensive detailing of the history of African-American music throughout the history of the US.

The documentary features African American fiddlers such as Justin Robinson, Earl White, and Rhiannon Giddens and commentary from local historians and academics.

== Synopsis ==
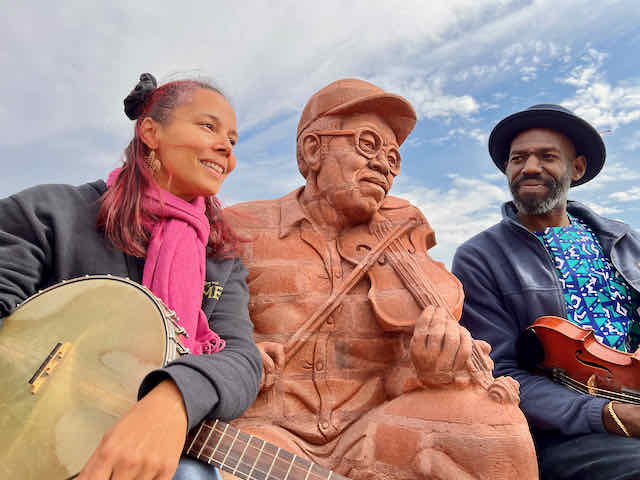
Carolina Chocolate Drops

The films focuses on Joe and Odell Thompson. Performances by Justin Robinson, Earl White, and Rhiannon Giddens are also present.

== Filming Location ==
Filming for the documentary took place in various locations including Harlem, Virginia, both Carolinas, Georgia, Texas, Oregon, and Ohio.
