= Women and Social Movements in the United States, 1600–2000 =

One of the premier collections on the World Wide Web for the teaching of U.S. history, Women and Social Movements in the United States, 1600 to 2000, includes (as of March 2014) 110 document projects with almost 4,350 documents and more than 153,000 pages of additional full-text sources relating to U.S. women's history.

Bi-annual releases (generally March and September) include not only new document projects and full-text sources, but also reviews of It also book, film, and web site. An enhanced search engine offers extensive metadata filters for both document projects and full text sources.

== History ==
=== Origins ===
Women and Social Movements in the United States, 1600 to 2000, began in 1997 with a small grant from the National Endowment for the Humanities. For six years, Kathryn Kish Sklar and her students at SUNY Binghamton developed document projects consisting of 20-30 transcribed documents focused around a historiographic question. Students not only transcribed the primary source documents, but also learned the necessary HTML for the placement of the project on the course web site. Document projects proved an ideal form for combining the internet's spaciousness with the historian's craft of working with primary sources. At the end of the first semester of teaching this senior seminar, Kathryn Sklar was joined by Thomas Dublin, her colleague at SUNY Binghamton, in creating an innovative website for the documentary projects, adding his knowledge of U.S. women's history and his experience with the use of computers in historical research. The first document project went live on a public web site in December 1997.

Women and Social Movements website grew rapidly. In 2001, with a second NEH grant, the editors began a collaboration with eleven faculty from other colleges and universities around the country. By the end of 2002, the website offered 43 documentary projects, authored in part by undergraduate students, which interpreted about 1,000 documents ranging in time from 1775 to 2000. The site attracted about 30,000 viewers a month from more than ninety countries. Yet two aspects of the website were not sustainable: the intensive labor needed to transform student work into authoritative scholarly analysis; and the initial sources of the site's funding.

This combination of success and challenges prompted a reconception of the Women and Social Movements website in the spring of 2002. Convinced that the technology and the format of the website were ideally matched to generate new knowledge in U.S. Women's History, Sklar and Dublin decided to encourage faculty and advanced graduate students to author document projects for the site. That effort proved remarkably successful; the website now includes document projects and archives from a wide range of scholars drawing on their specialized knowledge of women and social movements. Sklar and Dublin established an Editorial Board for the website as well as guidelines for submissions with blind peer review.

=== Alexander Street Press ===
Yet despite this expansion, in the spring of 2002 the site's future seemed uncertain because grant funding was no longer available (the site was no longer experimental), and the editors were unable to locate new sources of funding for the staff of graduate students who maintained the site and made its expansion possible. This funding dilemma was solved when Stephen Rhind-Tutt of Alexander Street Press, approached the editors and suggested that they consider publishing jointly with ASP. The press could fund the website's costs through library subscriptions to the site. In 2003 the editors decided to publish jointly with ASP. This relationship has provided stability for the website and facilitated its expansion.

In March 2004 Women and Social Movements, which now published quarterly, began to include digitized versions of books and pamphlets related to women and social movements in the U.S. Initially these volumes focused on one hundred years of the woman suffrage movement, 1830–1930, including the six volumes of The History of Woman Suffrage (1881–1922) edited by Elizabeth Cady Stanton, Susan B. Anthony, and other leaders of the woman suffrage movement and all the proceedings of the three national conventions of anti-slavery women held in the 1830s and of the Seneca Falls Convention and the National Women's Rights Conventions held between 1848 and 1870. Alexander Street Press has provided detailed indexing and database searching for these and other resources on the site, greatly improving its scholarly utility. A Dictionary of Social Movements and a Chronology of U.S. Women's History, both especially prepared for the website, provide users unique subject access to both document projects and full-text sources on the site. Book reviews and website reviews were also incorporated into each issue.

=== Scholar's Edition ===
In March 2007 Sklar and Dublin began co-publishing with Alexander Street Press a greatly expanded version of the database—the Scholar's Edition of Women and Social Movements. This edition features an online archive of all publications by federal, state, and local commissions on the status of women since 1963. Constituting 90,000 pages of documents collected from over 300 repositories, these commission publications offer a major new set of sources for research on the lives of American women since 1960. In addition, the Scholar's Edition includes the first electronic version of Harvard University Press's five-volume biographical dictionary, Notable American Women (1971–2004), which is fully indexed and searchable.

With Volume 13 (2009) the publication schedule of Women and Social Movements became semi-annual, publishing in the spring (March) and fall (September) due to the larger size of each issue requiring a longer production schedule. Each issue now includes three document projects or document archives—along with book reviews, notes from the archive, teaching tools, and full text sources.

=== International Edition ===
With the assistance of a large advisory board, Sklar and Dublin developed an ambitious plan to create an online archive of women's international activism. The two traveled extensively, and ultimately, materials from over 250 libraries in the US and abroad, were included in a second International database. Women and Social Movements International 1840 to Present, began in 2008, was completed in 2013. consisting of 25 scholarly essays, over 4,600 sources of published and manuscript resources, as well as links to 124 online resources. The database includes the same metadata rich search functions as the U.S. version, but also allows users to create their own playlists of documents, images, and videos.
