= Cortázar sin barba =

2004 Argentinian biography

- Author: Eduardo Montes-Bradley
- Language: Spanish
- Subject: Julio Cortázar
- Genre: Biography
- Publisher: Random House Mondadori
- Publication date: 2005 (Spain)
- Publication place: Spain
- Media type: Hardcover
- Pages: 394
- ISBN: 84-8306-603-3

Cortázar sin barba (Cortázar Without a Beard) is a biography of Argentine writer Julio Cortázar, written by Eduardo Montes-Bradley and first published in 2004 by Editorial Sudamericana in Argentina.

== Bibliography ==
- Montes-Bradley, Eduardo (2005) Cortázar sin barba. Madrid: Random House Mondadori. ISBN 84-8306-603-3.
