= Eduardo Montes-Bradley =

Argentine-American documentarian and photographer

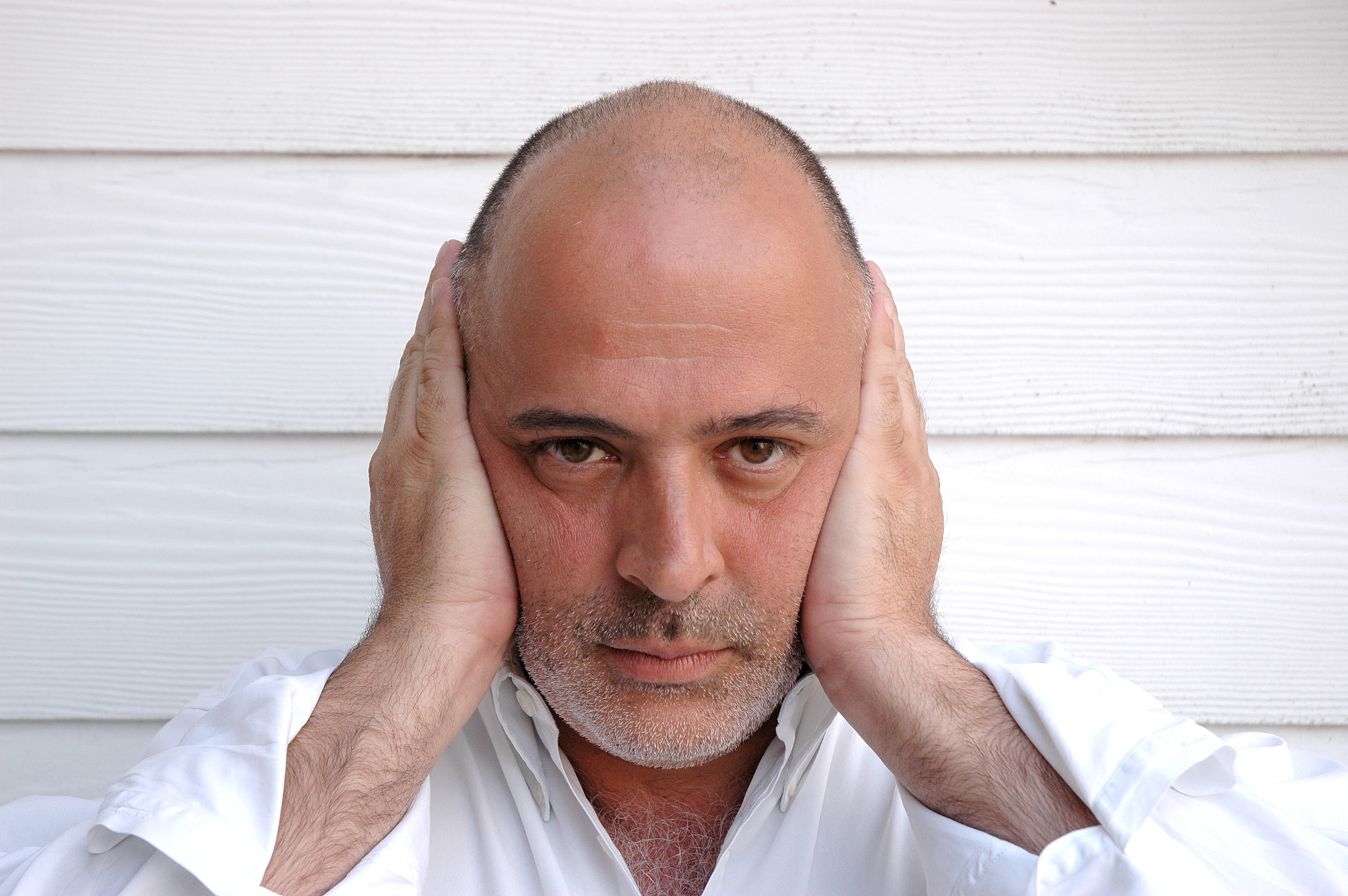
- Born: July 9, 1960 (age 66); Córdoba, Argentina
- Occupation: Documentarian
- Years active: 1979–present
- Notable work: Julian Bond, Rita Dove, Evita
- Spouse: Soledad Liendo
- Relatives: Eduardo Bradley, Enrique Ferrarese
- Website: www.montesbradley.com

Eduardo Montes-Bradley (born July 1960) is a documentary filmmaker born in Córdoba, whose work focuses on biographical, cultural, and historical subjects. He is co-founder of Heritage Film Project and resides in Charlottesville. In addition to his work in film, he is the author of Cortázar sin barba, a literary biography of Julio Cortázar published by Random House Mondadori. His most recent works include The Piccirilli Factor, a film about the Italian-American sculptors, and Black Fiddlers. He is also known for directing Evita (2008), Rita Dove: An American Poet, Harto the Borges, and Daniel Chester French: American Sculptor made possible with the support of the National Trust for Historic Preservation. Among Montes-Bradley's other documentary works is his biographical film on civil rights leader Julian Bond.

== Early life ==
According to USA-Painter, Eduardo Montes-Bradley's background has played a crucial role in shaping his approach to filmmaking. Raised in Buenos Aires, his mother was of Eastern European descent, the daughter of Jewish immigrants who arrived in Argentina during the interwar period. His father, Nelson, was of mixed heritage, descended from Italian, Galician, and New England families who had settled in Buenos Aires in the first half of the 19th century. Nelson was one of the founders of Discos Qualiton, where he worked in 1974 while attending public school. Montes-Bradley's theatrical debut in documentary film was his biographical film on Osvaldo Soriano.

== Career ==
In a 1996 appearance on CNN, hosted by Ismael Cala, Montes-Bradley described his work creating documentary films about underrepresented stories as a continuation of the work his father and his partners at Discos Qualiton were doing by publishing underrepresented works of otherwise well-known European composers and less-known vernacular composers such as Carlos Guastavino and Alberto Ginastera.

In 1986, Montes-Bradley founded The Entertainment Herald, a bilingual magazine based in Los Angeles catering to the film industry. Between 1988 and 1991, he produced and directed two films distributed by TriStar Pictures. In 1995, he produced and directed El Secuestro, his last fiction feature film.

In 1998, with the support of the ministries of culture in Argentina, Mexico, and Brazil, Montes-Bradley founded Contrakultura Films, which produced over 20 feature documentary films on Latin American writers, artists, and cultural traditions. In 2008, he established Heritage Film Project with producer Soledad Liendo. Heritage Film Project has since produced several films with the support of the Documentary Film Fund and others.

== Non-fiction ==
- Life and Music in the Age of George Frederick Bristow (2026) - With Leon Botstein, and Joseph Horowitz. Released on September, 2026 by Alexander Street.
- The Art of Joy Brown (2025) - With Joy Brown and Dave Matthews.
- The Piccirilli Factor (2025) - Released by Kanopy Streaming.
- Daniel Chester French: American Sculptor
- Black Fiddlers
- The Other Madisons
- Alice: At Home With Alice Parker - Documentary about composer Alice Parker and her collaborations with Robert Shaw, Archibald MacLeish, and Eudora Welty. Distributed by Kanopy. Mystic Film Festival, 2021, Grand Jury Award; Bare Bones Festival, 2022. The film was registered with the U.S. Copyright Office in 2025.
- Searching 4-Tabernero (2020) - Biographical essay on Peter Paul Weinschenk (Pablo Tabernero), exploring his Jewish origins in Berlin during the Weimar Republic and his exiles, first in Barcelona working with the militias of Buenaventura Durruti during the Spanish Civil War, and later in Buenos Aires, Argentina.
- A Soldier's Dream
- J.J. Lankes: Yankee Printmaker in Virginia (2019) - Documentary about Julius John Lankes and his collaborations with Robert Frost, Sherwood Anderson, and Roark Bradford. Made in collaboration with Welford Dunaway Taylor and the University of Richmond. Official Selection, Buffalo International Film Festival and Virginia Film Festival.
- The Gillenwater Story (2017) - Life of Jay Y. Gillenwater
- Lisboa (2017) - With Adriana Lisboa Fábregas Gurevitz. The film explores exile and literature. Premiered at Festivaletteratura in Mantua, September 5, 2014. Produced with support from the Brazilian Ministry of External Relations.
- Child of the Forest (2014) - Documentary about Holocaust survivor Yona Bromberg, who recalls her life from Rokitno.
- Saavedra: Between Berlin and a place called Peixoto (2013) - 30-minute documentary exploring the life and literary influences of Brazilian writer Carola Saavedra. Official Selection, Pedra Azul Film Festival, 2019. Produced with a grant from the Brazilian Ministry of External Relations.
- Rita Dove: An American Poet
- White: A Season in the Life of John Borden Evans (2012) - Portrait of contemporary Virginia artist John Borden Evans. 12th International Documentary Festival of Ierapetra; The Film Festival at Little Washington, 2015.
- Julian Bond: Reflections from the Frontlines of the Civil Rights Movement
- Andrés Waissman (2012) - Biographical documentary about contemporary artist Andrés Waissman.
- Leon Rozitchner's Window (2008) - With León Rozitchner.
- El Gran Simulador
- Deliciosas perversiones polimorfas (2007) - Biographical essay on Alberto Laiseca.
- Che: Rise & Fall
- Ismael Viñas: Witness of a Century (2005) - About Ismael Viñas, founder of Movimiento de Liberación Nacional (MALENA).
- Samba on your Feet
- Pérez Celis (2005) - About Pérez Celis.
- From Frankfurt to Humahuaca (2005). (Producer) Biographical-essay on Jorge Lovisolo, a philosopher entrenched in Salta; a disciple of The Frankfurt School. His perspectives on religion and local communities, the thoughts of Walter Benjamin, Herbert Marcuse, and Theodore Adorno. For NOA Producciones. Directed by Norberto Ramírez.
- American Manifesto (2005).
- Humberto Calzada - 30-minute biographical documentary about Humberto Calzada. Music by Gerardo Aguillón and José Angel Navarro. Distributed by Alexander Street Press and Kanopy.
- A Certain Regard
- Crónicas Mexicas (2004) - Documentary following Martín Caparrós and Montes-Bradley on the trail of Hernán Cortés from Veracruz to Tenochtitlan.
- Le Mot Juste (2004) - Biographical documentary about Héctor Tizón.
- Marcos Ribak aka Andrés Rivera (2004). Biographical film about Andres Rivera.
- Yo y el tiempo (2006). (Producer) Biographical-essay on poet-composer Juan José Botelli. For NOA Producciones. Directed by Norberto Ramírez.
- Kopla Vera (2004) - Ethnographic film on Jesús Ramón Vera. Directed by Norberto Ramírez, produced by Eduardo Montes-Bradley.
- Los cuentos del timonel (Tells of a Helmsman) (2002) - Biographical documentary about Osvaldo Bayer. Silver Condor Award, Best Documentary, 2002.
- Cortázar: apuntes para un documental
- Harto The Borges
- Soriano(1999).

== Fiction ==
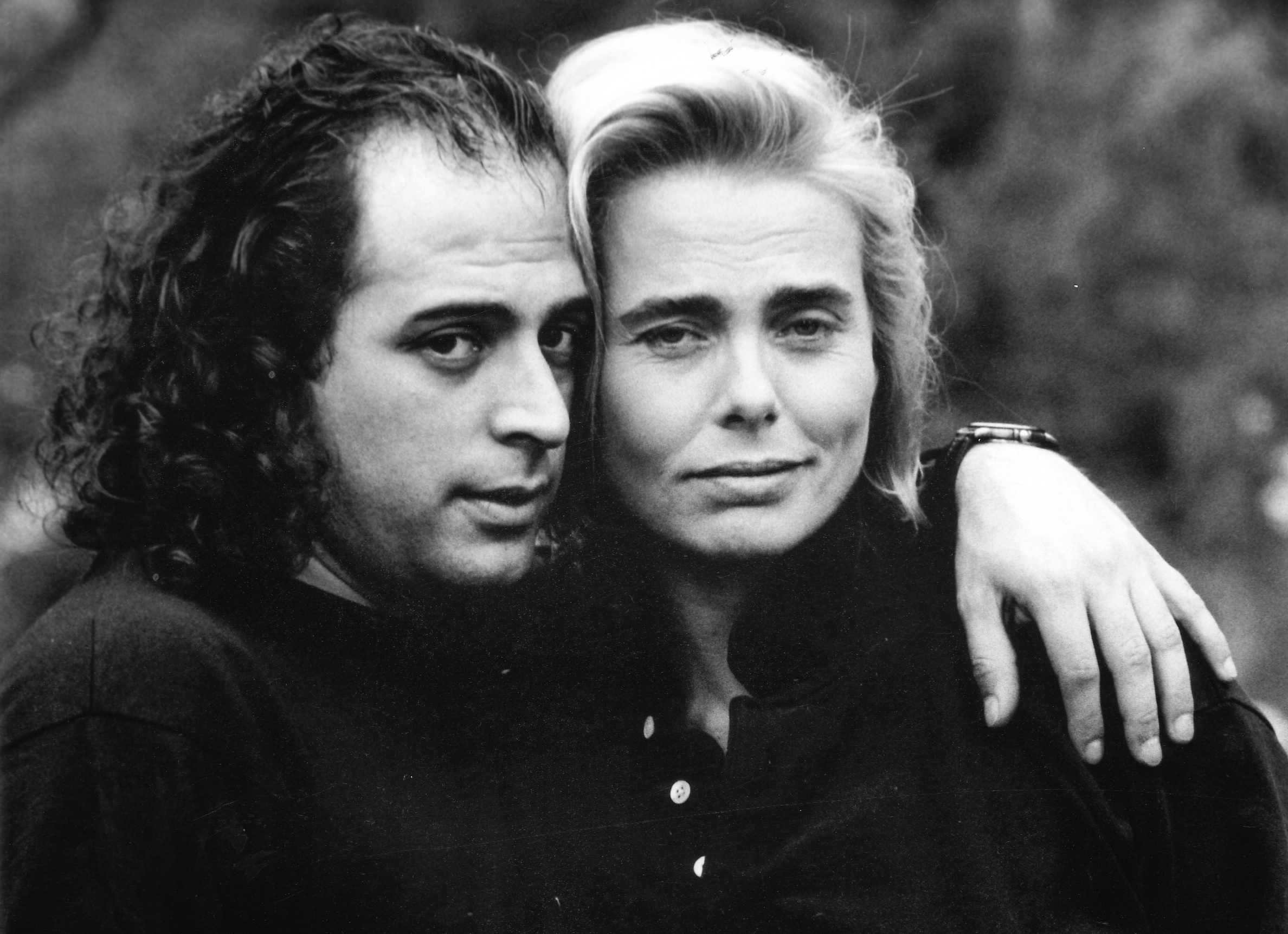
Production still: Margaux Hemingway

- El Sekuestro, 1997. Writer-Director. Parody of the misadventures of a revolutionary cell in South America. Starring Sandra Ballesteros, and Rodolfo Rani.
- Double Obsession, 1992. Writer-Director. TriStar Columbia. Thriller. Starring Margaux Hemingway, Scott Valentine, Jamie Horton, Maryam D'Abo and Frederic Forrest. Edited by John Venzon.
- SmoothTalker, 1990. Writer-Director. TriStar Columbia. Thriller. Starring Peter Crombie, Stuart Whitman, Sidney Lassick, Paul Raci and Burt Ward. Editor Sandra Adair.

== Experimental ==
- Frogments, 2000. Based on 8 mm images captured by Julio Cortázar in India and Africa with voice over by Allen Ginsberg.
- Freedom, 1986. Based on 8 mm images captured by Montes-Bradley in and around Los Angeles, Chicago, and Miami with focus in city homelessness.

== Music videos ==
- Rumbera, by Willy Chirino, Sony Music, Super 16mm 1994. Theatrical premiere at the Festival Internacional del Nuevo Cine Latinoamericano, 1994.
- Guadalajara, by Los Camperos de Nati Cano, Polygram Latino.
- Mujer de Fuego, by Olga Tañon, WEA Latina.
- Vendras Llorando, by Olga Tañon, WEA Latina.
- Amor Equivocado by Fabiana Cantilo, Warner Music.
- Dale Pascual, by Los enanitos verdes, Warner Music Group.

== Bibliography ==
Montes-Bradley, Eduardo (2019). Habeas corpus: Peter Paul Weinschenk, alias Pablo Tabernero. Buenos Aires: Mar del Plata International Film Festival, INCAA. p. 144. Biographical approach to Peter Paul Weinschenk, life and works of Pablo Tabernero, cinematographer of Prisioneros de la tierra directed by Mario Soffici.

Los dedos del huracán. Short story. Children's literature. Included in "De Ola en Ola 3" school textbook for third grade. Group Macmillan. Editorial Estrada S.A., Buenos Aires, Argentina. Illustrated by Eugenia Nobati. pp. 62–67.

Montes-Bradley, Eduardo (2016). El amigo de Filloy: cartas de RE Montes i Bradley a Juan Filloy (1935-1976). Charlottesville, VA. p. 186. ISBN 9781534777682. Correspondence between Juan Filloy and Montes i Bradley.

Montes-Bradley, Eduardo (2012). La resurrección de Ocantos. Los Angeles, CA. p. 62. ISBN 9781449907402. Bio-bibliographical essay on Carlos María Ocantos.

Montes-Bradley, Eduardo (2005). Cortázar sin barba. Madrid: Random House Mondadori. p. 394. ISBN 8483066033. Biography of Julio Cortázar. 1st edition Editorial Sudamericana, Argentina 2004. 3rd edition, Pesódromo 21, 2014.

Montes-Bradley, Eduardo (2000). Água No Terceiro Milênio. Brasília: Bianchi Editores, Ediciones Pilar. p. 318. ISBN 9974663172. Bilingual anthology of short stories. Selection of awarded works at the Literary Award "Agua no Terceiro Milênio". Bilingual Portuguese-Spanish edition. Includes the short story "Das schwerste Gewicht" previously published in Ya se que todo es mentira (1999).

Montes-Bradley, Eduardo (2000). Osvaldo Soriano: Un retrato. Buenos Aires: Grupo Editorial Norma. p. 171. ISBN 9879334353. Also published as Osvaldo Soriano: Un ritratto. Sperling & Kupfer Editori, Milan, Italy, 2001, 164pp. Translated by Gina Maneri. Collection: Continente Desaparecido, directed by Gianni Minà (ISBN 88-200-3201-5). Based on the homonymous documentary by the author.

Montes-Bradley, Eduardo (1999). Ya se que todo es mentira. Buenos Aires: Editorial del Nuevo Extremo. p. 200. ISBN 9509681857. (translated as I Know It's All Lies). Foreword by Osvaldo Bayer.

'Senxo', Selected Poems. Editorial Grupo Archivo de Comunicación, New York City, 1984. Foreword by Armando Tejada Gómez. Out of print.

== Journalism ==
Montes-Bradley contributed to El País, Babelia, Les cinemas de la Amerique Latine by Association Rencontres Cinémas d'Amérique Latine de Toulouse, France; La Jornada, Mexico; the monthly review Latinoamérica e Tutto il Sud dell Mondo, Italy; and in Argentina to the literary magazine Esperando a Godot; the art-magazine Revista Lote, Venado Tuerto, Suplemento Radar published by Página/12, El Amante de cine, Diario Perfil, Revista Ñ Clarín, Critica de Argentina, and La Nación. Montes-Bradley was a frequent collaborator with the literary blog "Nación Apache."

== Photography ==
Montes-Bradley was recognized by the National Council on Public History with the "Outstanding Public History Project Award" as part of the exhibit "The Mere Distinction of Colour" produced by James Madison's Montpelier. His photo-work appeared in The AtlanticThe Washington Post, La Nación, The Independent, Diario Clarín, other newspapers and magazines, as well as "Escenas de la memoria. La Casa Argentina en la voz de sus antiguos residentes", and "Aventura Turnberry Jewish Center 20th Anniversary". His work is partially preserved at the Claude Moore Health Sciences Library, the University of Virginia.

== Awards and honors ==
- Alice: At Home With Alice Parker Mystic Film Festival, 2021, Grand Jury Prize; Virginia Film Festival Official Selection, 2020.
- "Los cuentos del timonel" Best Documentary by the Argentine Film Critics Association.
- A Soldier's Dream Best Documentary, 9th Historical and Military Film Festival, Warsaw;Best Biography, Oniros Film Awards, 2019; Best Feature Documentary, Port Orchard Film Festival, 2019; Official Selection, Western European Film Festival, 2019; Courage Film Festival, Berlin, 2019; San Francisco Veteran's Film Festival, 2018; Flickers' Rhode Island International Film Festival, 2018; Great Western Catskills International Film Festival, 2018.
- The Other Madisons: Official Selection, Mystic Film Festival, 2021; Martha's Vineyard Film Festival; Atlanta Black Pride Film Festival, 2021; Official Selection DC Black Film Festival, 2021; Official Selection Roxbury International Film Festival, 2021. Honorable Mention, Black Truth Film Festival, 2022.
- White: A Season in the Life of John Borden Evans: 4th International Documentary Festival of Ierapetra, Best Documentary; Richmond International Film Festival, Best Documentary; Virginia Film Festival, Official Selection. Best Documentary, Richmond International Film Festival; Best Documentary Film, 6th International Documentary Festival of Ierapetra Awards, 2017.
- Monroe Hill: Jefferson Trust Award
- Julian Bond: Reflections from the Frontlines of the Civil Rights Movement: 4th Annual Baltimore International Black Film Festival, Best Documentary Film.
- Harto The Borges: 12e Rencontres Cinémas d'Amerique Latine, Official Selection, Toulouse, 2000.

== Appearances in other media ==
- Margaux Hemingway, E! True Hollywood Story. USA, 1996.
- Jorge Giannoni. NN, ése soy yo, 2000.
- Derrumbe. Novel by Daniel Guebel. Random House Mondadori, 2012.
- Mis escritores muertos. Novel by Daniel Guebel. Random House Mondadori, 2012.
- Zenitram, film by Luis Barone.
