= Martín Caparrós =

Argentine writer (born 1957)

- Caparrós in 2005
- Born: May 29, 1957 (age 69); Buenos Aires, Argentina
- Occupations: Novelist, journalist, essayist
- Writing career
- Genre: Various

Martín Caparrós (born May 29, 1957) is an Argentine writer, journalist, essayist and social commentator. As an author he is widely known for his detailed and insightful works of fiction and non-fiction. Some of his most notable books include La Voluntad, El Hambre, and El Interior. His books have been translated into numerous languages, earning him widespread acclaim.

== Biography ==
Juventud Peronista He studied at the Colegio Nacional de Buenos Aires. Since 1971, at the age of 14, he was active in student and neighborhood groups of the Peronist Youth, which supported the Argentine Revolutionary Armed Forces (FAR). In February 1974, at 16, he began his career as a journalist at the Montoneros newspaper Noticias, which shared the same political line, whose director was Miguel Bonasso, deputy director Paco Urondo, and editor-in-chief Juan Gelman; the head of the crime section—where Caparrós worked—was Rodolfo Walsh. When the Peronist government closed Noticias in August 1974, he began writing about football in the magazine Goles.

At the end of 1975, disagreeing with the political direction taken by the Juventud Peronista, he left his activism and went into exile in France. Years later he earned a degree in History from the University of Paris and later lived in Madrid until 1983. There he wrote his first novels—No velas a tus muertos, Ansay o los infortunios de la gloria—worked as a translator, and collaborated with the newspaper El País and French magazines and radio stations.

In 1983 he returned to Buenos Aires, where he worked in the cultural section of the newspaper Tiempo Argentino. In 1984, along with Jorge Dorio, he hosted a successful program on Radio Belgrano called Sueños de una noche de Belgrano. He returned to Spain as a correspondent for that station during 1985 and 1986.

In 1987 he participated in the creation of the newspaper Página/12 along with Jorge Lanata, its first director. The following year he co-hosted the television program El monitor argentino with Jorge Dorio on Canal 13 and founded the magazine Babel, which he directed.

Starting in 1991, he began publishing his journalistic stories in the monthly magazine Página/30, where he later became editor-in-chief, under the title Crónicas de fin de siglo. These texts received the King of Spain International Journalism Awards and were published in 1992 in a book, Larga distancia, which is now study material in journalism courses in Spain and Latin America.

During the 90s he published several novels, including one, La Historia, which he still considers his most significant work. He also published, together with Eduardo Anguita, the three volumes of La Voluntad. Una historia de los movimientos revolucionarios en la Argentina. In those years he wrote for various Argentine and Latin American media; in 1998 he was the New York correspondent for Perfil. From 1999 he worked on the program Día D, hosted by Jorge Lanata on América TV.

At that time he was also invited to join as a teacher at the Gabo Foundation, then directed by its creator, Gabriel García Márquez. He has taught numerous workshops there and is part of its Governing Council.

In the 21st century he worked as a consultant for the United Nations Population Fund, a columnist for The New York Times, and a visiting professor at NYU, Cornell University, Pompeu Fabra, Autónoma de Barcelona, and many Latin American universities. Meanwhile, his literary and journalistic production never stopped. In total, he has published some 50 books in about 30 countries. These include notable essays such as Hunger and Ñamérica, and novels like Los living and BUE, all winners of international awards.

On November 16, 2017, he was named an Illustrious Citizen of Buenos Aires. In June 2025, he received an honorary doctorate from the University of Buenos Aires and, shortly after, from the University of Mar del Plata; in November 2025, he received one from the University of Guadalajara, Mexico.

He currently lives in Madrid, Spain, and publishes his columns in the newspaper El País. In 2024, he revealed that he was suffering from Amyotrophic lateral sclerosis (ALS), which he had been suffering from for two years before the announcement.

== Fiction ==
- 1984: Ansay o los infortunios de la gloria
- 1986: No velas a tus muertos
- 1990: El tercer cuerpo
- 1990: La noche anterior
- 1999: La Historia
- 2001: Un día en la vida de Dios
- 2004: Valfierno
- 2008: A quien corresponda
- 2011: Los Living
- 2013: Comí
- 2016: Echeverría
- 2018: Todo por la patria
- 2020: Sinfín
- 2022: Sarmiento
- 2023: Ojos que no ven
- 2024: Vidas de J.M.
- 2024: Antes que Nada
- 2024: Horror de Buenos Aires
- 2024: Los suicidios de Gardel
- 2024: Viva la muerte
- 2025: Bue

== Non-fiction ==
- 1992 – Larga distancia
- 1994 – Dios Mío
- 1995 – La Patria Capicúa
- 1997 – La Voluntad
- 1999 – La guerra moderna
- 2001 – Extinción, últimas imágenes del trabajo en la Argentina.
- 2002 – Bingo!
- 2003 – Amor y anarquía
- 2002 – Qué País, Informe urgente sobre la Argentina que viene.
- 2005 – Boquita, Editorial Planeta, 354 pages.
- 2006 – El Interior.
- 2009 – Una luna.
- 2010 – Contra el cambio.
- 2012 – Argentinismos.
- 2014 – Hunger: The Oldest Problem, Melville House Publishing
- 2016 – Lacronica
- 2018 – Postales
- 2019 – Ahorita
- 2021 – Ñamerica
- 2023 – El mundo entonces. Una historia del presente

== Awards and distinctions ==
- 1992: King of Spain International Journalism Award for Crónicas de fin de siglo
- 2004: Planeta Latin America Award for Valfierno
- 2011: Herralde Novel Prize for Los Living
- 2014: Konex Platinum Award in the category "Chronicles and Testimonies"
- 2016: Extraordinary Cálamo Award for Hunger
- 2016: Tiziano Terzani International Literary Prize for Hunger
- 2016: Caballero Bonald International Essay Prize for Hunger
- 2017: Miguel Delibes National Journalism Award for his articles in El País
- 2017: Maria Moors Cabot Prize (Columbia University - NYC)
- 2017: Illustrious Citizen of the Autonomous City of Buenos Aires
- 2019: Ítaca Award in recognition of his journalistic career (U.A.B. - Barcelona)
- 2022: Special Jury Prize of the Archiletras Language Awards
- 2022: Ortega y Gasset Awards for professional career
- 2023: Roger Caillois Prize
- 2024: Konex Award in the category "Chronicle"
- 2025: Honorary Doctorate (honoris causa) from the University of Buenos Aires
- 2025: Honorary Doctorate (honoris causa) from the University of Mar del Plata.
- 2025: Honorary Doctorate (honoris causa) from the University of Guadalajara, Mexico

== Filmography ==
- Crónicas Mexicas, Contrakultura Films, 2003. Directed by Eduardo Montes-Bradley.
- Cazadores de Utopías. Directed by David Blaustein.
- ¿Quién mató a Mariano Ferreyra?, 2013. Directed by Alejandro Rath and Julián Morcillo.
