= Jorge Giannoni =

Argentine filmmaker

Jorge Gianonni (1939 — 1995) was an independent Argentine filmmaker.

One of the milestones of his career on film was his collaboration in Raymundo Gleyzer’s La tierra quema, shot in Northeastern Brazil; also in Brazil, he collaborated with Glauber Rocha in his Terra em transe (Land in Anguish). Giannoni studied at the Centro Sperimentale di Cinematografia in Rome, and worked next to Federico Fellini in his film Roma. As a RAI correspondent in Paris, Gianonni witnessed the events of May 1968. Within that context he concluded his avant-garde underground film Molotov Party (https://www.youtube.com/watch?v=-8z5ApgROg4, https://www.youtube.com/watch?v=-paargxMVvM, https://www.youtube.com/watch?v=6AzYwHqgIgc). As a member of the Colectivo de Cine del 3 Mundo (CC3M) he co-produced the documentary Palestina, otro Vietnam (Palestine, Another Vietnam). Giannoni also directed the documentary film Las vacas sagradas (Sacred Cows), a film denouncing the economic policies of the strongman General Juan Carlos Onganía, "Sacred Cows" was produced by Instituto Cubano de Cine (ICAIC).

Within a context of great political agitation, Giannoni returned to Argentina in 1974. In Buenos Aires, he created the Instituto de Cine del Tercer Mundo (Third World Film Institute), which was then merged with Raymundo Gleyzer’s Cine de la Base (Cinema of the People). Shortly thereafter the University of Buenos Aires was pressured by the government of Isabel Perón to close the Institute, and he had to leave the country for Peru, and then Cuba, where he resided until his return to Argentina in 1983. Giannoni died in Buenos Aires in 1995.

Director Gabriela Jaime made a documentary of the independent filmmaker, Jorge Giannoni, NN, ese soy yo (Giannoni: No Name, That's Me), in 2000.
