= El Gran Simulador =

The Great Simulator
- El Gran Simulador
- Directed by: Eduardo Montes-Bradley
- Written by: Eduardo Montes-Bradley
- Produced by: Eduardo Montes-Bradley
- Edited by: Emiliano Serra
- Production company: Contrakultura
- Distributed by: EMB Entertainment
- Release date: 2007
- Running time: 75 minutes
- Country: Argentina
- Language: Spanish

El Gran Simulador (released in Uruguay as No a los papelones (No to the papers)) is a 2007 political documentary directed by Argentine-American filmmaker Eduardo Montes-Bradley.

== Critical reception ==
Variety described the film as "ultimately little more than a showcase for its bumptious helmer-star, motormouth Eduardo Montes-Bradley, bidding to be Argentina’s Michael Moore".
