= A Soldier's Dream =

- Directed by: Eduardo Montes-Bradley
- Written by: Eduardo Montes-Bradley
- Produced by: Heritage Film Project
- Starring: Milton Feldman
- Cinematography: Eduardo Montes-Bradley
- Edited by: Eduardo Montes-Bradley
- Distributed by: Heritage Film Project, Kanopy Streaming
- Release date: August 11, 2018
- Running time: 50 minutes
- Country: United States
- Language: English

A Soldier's Dream (also known as A Soldier's Dream: The Milt Feldman Story) is a 2018 American documentary film. The 50-minute documentary tells the story of Milton "Milt" Feldman, a Jewish-American soldier who served as a Private First Class with the 106th Infantry Division during World War II. Private Feldman was captured during the Battle of the Bulge and subsequently held as a prisoner of war at Stalag IV-B.

== Synopsis ==
The documentary follows Milton Feldman through his capture by German forces during the Battle of the Bulge in December 1944 and his imprisonment at a prisoner-of-war camp, through his eventual liberation by Soviet troops. The film also examines Feldman's family background, including his father's immigration from Poland, the hardships of the Great Depression, and the rise of antisemitism that brought Nazi sympathizers to the streets of New York. It features interviews with the then 94-year-old veteran reflecting on his military service and the legacy of World War II.

== Production ==
A Soldier's Dream was written and directed by Eduardo Montes-Bradley and produced by Heritage Film Project in 2018. The documentary drew on a previous interview with Feldman conducted by Seth Bauer. Filming took place at Feldman's residence at Stoneridge Creek in Pleasanton, California, at sites connected to the Battle of the Bulge, and along the road to Stalag IV-B in Germany.

== Release and distribution ==
The documentary premiered on August 11, 2018, at a special screening at Stoneridge Creek in Pleasanton, California. The film was later broadcast on PBS stations.

== Critical reception ==
A Soldier's Dream received multiple festival awards. It won Best Documentary at the International Historical and Military Film Festival in Warsaw. On November 3, 2018, the film screened at the San Francisco Veterans' Film Festival, and on November 4 at the Virginia Film Festival. On November 6, 2018, it was presented at the Rhode Island International Film Festival.

== Subject ==
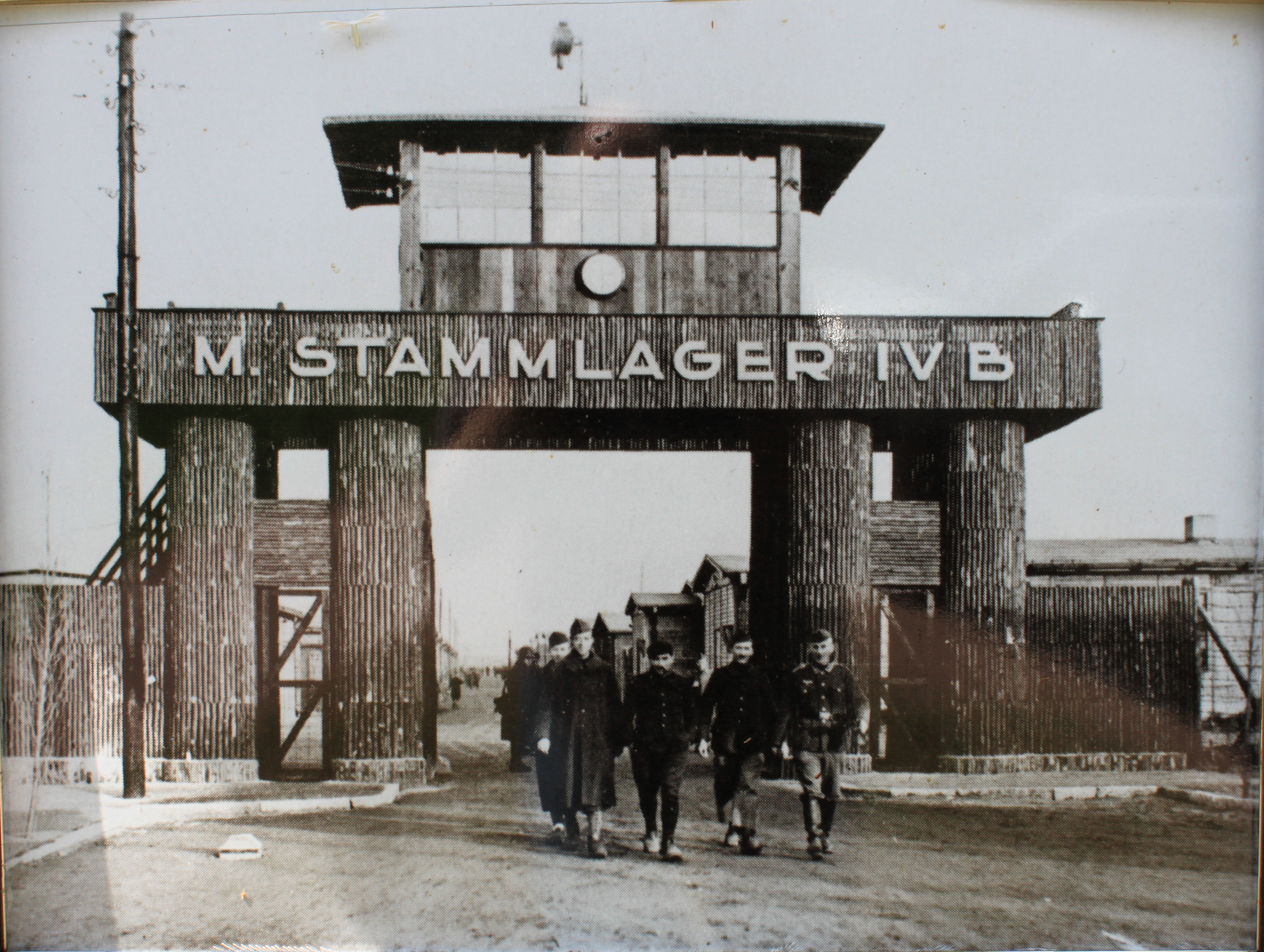
Stalag IV-B

Milton Feldman was a Jewish-American soldier who served with the 106th Infantry Division during World War II. He was captured during the Battle of the Bulge — one of the largest battles fought by American forces during the war — and held as a prisoner of war at Stalag IV-B. In the film's final sequence, Feldman reads "A Soldier's Dream," a poem he wrote in the trenches as German forces advanced. The poem reflects his pacifism and his relief at having survived without having to harm anyone.

== See also ==
- Battle of the Bulge
- 106th Infantry Division (United States)
- Stalag IV-B
- World War II prisoners of war
