= Kanopy =

Streaming service for libraries

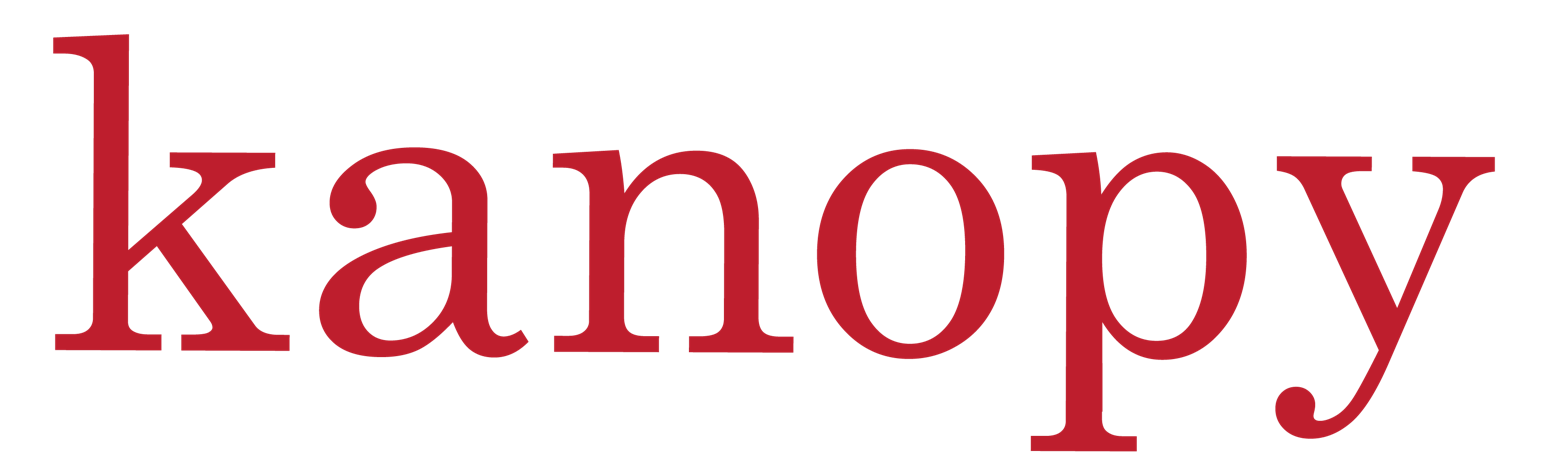
- Type: Subsidiary
- Industry: Video streaming
- Founded: December 25, 2008 in Scarborough, Western Australia
- Founder: Olivia Humphrey
- Headquarters: San Francisco, California, U.S.
- Number of locations: 1
- Area served: Worldwide
- Owner: OverDrive
- Parent: KKR
- Website: www.kanopy.com

Kanopy is an on-demand streaming video platform for public and academic libraries that offers films, TV shows, educational videos and documentaries. The service is free for end users, but libraries pay fees on a pay-per-view model, from which content owners and content creators are paid.

The company was founded in Scarborough, Western Australia, in 2008 and moved its headquarters to San Francisco, California a few years later. It was acquired by OverDrive in 2021.

== History ==
Kanopy was founded on December 25, 2008, at Scarborough, Western Australia, by Olivia Humphrey, an Australian entrepreneur, as an educational tool for colleges and universities. Until 2010, the company functioned only as a DVD distributor, moving into streaming in that year. After attaining considerable success in Australia, New Zealand, Hong Kong and Singapore, it expanded into the UK and US, and soon afterwards moved its headquarters to San Francisco, with Humphrey remaining as CEO.

In November 2019, Kevin Sayar succeeded Humphrey as CEO. On June 9, 2021, OverDrive announced that it had reached a deal to acquire Kanopy. The acquisition was completed on July 15, 2021.

== Services ==
Kanopy provides each participating public library, college and university with a dedicated and customizable website through which members can stream films, TV shows, documentaries and educational videos. The service includes features such as captions, transcripts, clip creation, and playlist creation that allow users to create, edit and share videos.

== Business model ==
Public library patrons, college and university students and faculty are able to watch Kanopy free-of-charge with their institution's library card. Institutions pay for the films their students and faculty watch on a pay-per-view basis. This model used by libraries is referred to as "patron-driven acquisition", where each view (watching a video for 30 seconds or more) will prompt the sale of a license fee for that title. Costs vary per institutional contract, but have been estimated in 2019 for single titles to be $150 for one year, $350 for a three-year license.

Librarians have access to an administrative dashboard which allows them to view user analytics and adjust budgets.

On July 1, 2019, three of the largest public libraries in the United States—the New York Public Library, the Brooklyn Public Library, and the Queens Public Library—discontinued Kanopy, citing unpredictable and unsustainable costs.

== Device support ==
Kanopy can be viewed on a computer, mobile device, or television via a web browser supporting HTML video or the Kanopy app for Amazon Fire tablet and Fire Stick, Android, Apple iOS, Chromecast and Roku.

== See also ==
- Hoopla, a competing service
