= Alexander Street =

Electronic academic database publisher

- Type: Subsidiary
- Industry: Database publishing; audio and video streaming
- Founded: 2000; 26 years ago
- Founder: Stephen Rhind-Tutt, Eileen Lawrence
- Headquarters: Alexandria, Virginia, United States
- Number of locations: Alexandria, Virginia; New York City, New York; Reading, UK; Brisbane, Australia; Shanghai, China
- Number of employees: ≈100
- Parent: Clarivate
- Website: alexanderstreet.com

Alexander Street is an electronic academic database publisher. It was founded in May 2000 in Alexandria, Virginia, by Stephen Rhind-Tutt (President), Janice Cronin (CFO), and Eileen Lawrence (Vice President, Sales and Marketing). As of January 2016, the company had grown to more than 100 employees with offices in the United States, Australia, Brazil, China, and the United Kingdom. In June 2016, it was acquired by ProQuest.

== History ==
The company's first product was North American Women's Letters and Diaries, a collection of 150,000 pages of letters and diaries by women from colonial times through the 1950s.

In 2000, in collaboration with the ARTFL project at the University of Chicago, the company began using semantic indexing techniques in its humanities databases. It created metadata elements for gender, age, and sexual orientation of characters within plays; author nationality, birthplace and death place, as well as where and when an item was written. These elements were then combined with full-text search to allow material to be analyzed in new ways.

In 2003, the company began a major partnership with The Center for the Historical Study of Women and Gender at the State University of New York to publish Women and Social Movements in the United States, 1600–2000. This has subsequently become a leading site for the study of women's history.

In November 2004, Alexander Street acquired the principal assets of Classical International, a London and New York–based publisher of streaming music for libraries. This led to a new range of music publications, including a partnership with the Smithsonian Institution to provide Smithsonian Global Sound for Libraries and African American Song.

In November 2005, Alexander Street acquired the range of religious products produced by Ad Fontes, including The Digital Library of Classic Protestant Texts and The Digital Library of the Catholic Reformation.

In October 2006, the company acquired the assets of University Music Editions, a small microfilm publisher specializing in the publication of scores, journals and other musically oriented publications. These collections were subsequently released as part of Classical Scores Library.

Late in 2006, the company began developing online collections of video. Theatre in Video was published in April 2007 and has been followed by a succession of online streaming video collections. Using techniques such as semantic indexing, initially developed for textual databases, it was an early provider of synchronized, scrolling transcripts that allow the watcher to read ahead. At the 2010 Midsummer American Library Association, the company advertised 9 streaming video collections spanning more than 9,000 individual video titles.

In April 2007, Alexander Street acquired the principal products of HarpWeek, publisher of Harper's Weekly and Lincoln and the Civil War. In June 2009 Alexander Street Press and Arcadia Publishing launched a research website to college local history information from around the United States and Canada.

In September 2010, Alexander Street acquired Microtraining Associates, a specialist producer and distributor of therapy and counseling videos. In 2011, Alexander Street acquired the documentary film distributor Filmmakers Library. In 2012, it acquired the principal assets of Asia Pacific Films. In November 2013, Alexander Street announced the acquisition of Insight Media, a New York–based vendor of DVD and streaming media, bringing the ASP catalog to more than 50,000 academic video titles.

In one of the first and largest independent surveys on streaming video in North American academic libraries by Deg Farrelly (Arizona State University) and Jane Hutchison (William Paterson University), Alexander Street emerged as the leading vendor, used at more than 60% of sites. Insight Media was present at some 10% of sites.

In 2013, the company launched a series of case study databases which combine books, audio, video, reports, pamphlets, and other primary sources. The first two of these were Engineering Case Studies Online, which documented major accidents of the 20th century, and Psychological Experiments Online, which documented seminal experiments on and about humans.

In 2015, the company secured an arrangement with CBS to publish episodes of Sixty Minutes from 1996 to 2014. It also announced open access initiatives in anthropology (The Anthropology Commons) and music (The Open Music Library). The following June, Alexander Street Press was acquired by ProQuest and renamed "Alexander Street – a ProQuest Company."

In February 2022 ProQuest was itself acquired by Clarivate and Alexander Street became a Clarivate company.

== Products ==
As of 2016, the company's principal products are Academic Video Online (50,000 academically oriented video titles), Music Online (a collection of 8.3 Million tracks of music, together with scores, and reference works), over 120 primary source collections offerings across the curriculum, and over 60,000 video titles. These materials are made available using a wide range of business models, including demand driven (Access-to-Own, EBA, PDA), subscriptions, and perpetual licenses.
