= National Route 158 (Argentina) =

Highway in Argentina

National Route 158
- Ruta nacional 158

Route information
- Length: 285 km (177 mi)

Major junctions
- Northeast end: San Francisco
- in San Francisco in Villa María in Río Cuarto
- Southwest end: Río Cuarto

Location
- Country: Argentina

Highway system
- Highways in Argentina

National Route 158 is a highway in Argentina, which is located in the center-east of the province of Córdoba. From the junction with National Route 19 in San Francisco to the junction with National Route 36 in Río Cuarto, it travels 285 kilometres (177 mi).

This road is part of the Mercosur-Chile Corridor, defined by IIRSA as one of the three integration axes in Argentina.

Formerly, this road was Provincial Route 1. By means of an agreement made on 19 October 1976, this route passed into national jurisdiction. In 2012, National Route 19 was built as an extension, which begins at National Route 11 and ends at National Route 158. With the incorporation of the new section, new roads were opened for 118.5 kilometres (73.6 mi).

== Cities ==
The cities and towns this route passes through from northeast to southwest are as follows (towns with fewer than 5,000 inhabitants are in italics).

=== Córdoba Province ===
Travel: 285 km (km 0 to 285).

- San Justo Department: San Francisco (km 0), Monte Redondo (km ), Quebracho Herrado (km ), Colonia Prosperidad (km ), Saturnino María Laspiur (km 46), Las Varas (km 64), Las Varillas (km 78) and Trinchera (km ).
- Río Segundo Department: Pozo del Molle (km 102).
- General San Martín Department: La Playosa (km 116), Arroyo Algodón (km 133), Las Mojarras (km ), Villa María (km 159), Arroyo Cabral (km 175) and Luca (km ).
- Tercero Arriba Department: Dalmacio Vélez Sársfield (km 196) and Las Perdices (km 212).
- Juárez Celman Department: General Deheza (km 223), General Cabrera (km 234) and Carnerillo (km 250).
- Río Cuarto Department: Las Higueras (km 283) and Río Cuarto (km 285)
