= Lilia Lardone =

Argentine writer (1941–2026)

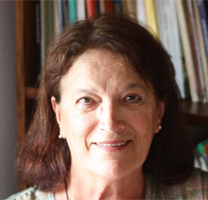
- Lardone in 2012
- Born: Lilia María Lardone; 24 October 1941; Hernando, Córdoba Province, Argentina
- Died: 31 August 2026 (aged 84); Córdoba, Argentina
- Education: National University of Córdoba
- Occupation: Writer

Lilia María Lardone (24 October 1941 – 31 August 2026) was an Argentine writer. Focusing on children's and young adult literature, Lardone did not write professionally until she was in her 50s. Prior to that, she worked for the Department of Culture in Córdoba, where she organized community events and, starting the 1980s, taught writing workshops. Her first novel, Puertas adentro, was published in 1998. She also wrote poetry and non-fiction.

== Early life and education ==
Lardone was born in Hernando, Córdoba, Argentina on 24 October 1941. Raised in Hernando, she moved to the city of Córdoba when she was 14 to train as a teacher. After she qualified, she went on to study modern literature at the National University of Córdoba.

== Career ==
Ladrone did not start writing professionally until she was in her 50s; after completing her schooling, she instead began working for Córdoba's Department of Culture. At the department, she organized theatre performances and poetry reasons and, in the mid 1960s, helped arrange the city's first book fair. In the mid-1980s, she began teaching writing workshops, after which she turned to writing herself.

Her first novel, Puertas adentro, was published in 1998. Told from the perspective of Ottavia, the child of Italian immigrants in the Argentine countryside during the 1950s, the story tells of her life and responsibilities as a woman of that era, and the lives of her four siblings. It was given an honorable mention by the Fondo Nacional de las Artes. Within the next few years she published the children's book Caballero negro, which won the Norma-Fundalectura Latin American Prize in 1999, and the short story collection Papiros, which was listed in the 2003 White Ravens catalog. In these first few books, Ladrone used female protagonists and her writing dealt with political and cultural issues. She continued to write books for children and young adults, including La niña y la gata (2007), La gran persecución (2015), and El nombre de José.

Lardone's novel Esa chica was published in 2006. Set in the 1960s and 1970s, it tells a story about a young woman from the Argentine countryside who wants to move to the city to become an English teacher or professor. However, when staying in a boardinghouse with other girls, she meets, falls in love, and subsequently marries a wealthy man from a higher social class. This marriage places her in conflict with her new mother-in-law and isolates her from her old family and friends from the boarding house who are lower class and hold political views her husband disagrees with. Esa chica was released in 2026 by Editorial Bardos. In 2009, she won the Saúl Taborda literature prize.

Though primarily known as a novelist, Lardone also wrote poetry; in the early 2000s, she wrote Pequeña Ofelia and Diario del río. Released together, Pequeña Ofelia is about a girl whose father died when she was a child, while Diario del río takes the form of a diary, with perspectives alternating between somebody watching a river and the river itself.

She also wrote nonflction; alongside fellow writer María Teresa Andruetto, Ladrone wrote three books on writing workshops: La construcción del taller de escritura, La escritura en el taller, and El taller de escritura creativa: en la escuela, la biblioteca, el club. She and Andrutto also wrote Ribak, Reedson, Rivera. Conversaciones con Andrés Rivera, which contained interviews with the Argentine writer Andrés Rivera. By herself, Lardone wrote 20.25. Quince mujeres hablan de Eva Perón, based on interviews she did with women about their memories of the former first lady.

She served as a member of the Centro de Difusión e Investigación en Literatura Infantil y Juvenil and judged literary competitions. Her students included the writers Federico Falco and Maricel Palomeque.

== Personal life and death ==
Ladrone had two children and multiple grandchildren. She died on 31 August 2026, at the age of 84.

== Bibliography ==
- Puertas adentro (1998)
- Caballero negro (1999)
- Esa chica (2006)
- La niña y la gata (2007)
- La gran persecución (2015)
- El nombre de José
- Los asesinos de la calle Lafinur
- El día de las cosas perdidas
- El olor del cocodrilo
- Los Picucos

=== Short story collections ===
- Papiros (2002)
- Vidas de mentira (2003)

=== Poetry collections ===
- Pequeña Ofelia
- Diario del río

=== Nonfiction ===
- La construcción del taller de escritura. With María Teresa Andruetto
- La escritura en el taller. With María Teresa Andruetto
- El taller de escritura creativa: en la escuela, la biblioteca, el club. With María Teresa Andruetto
- Ribak, Reedson, Rivera. Conversaciones con Andrés Rivera. With María Teresa Andruetto
- 20.25. Quince mujeres hablan de Eva Perón (2012)
