= Lardone =

Notable people with the surname Lardone include:

- Francesco Lardone (1887 – 1980), Italian-born American prelate
- Lilia Lardone (1941– 2026), Argentine author
