= Contrakultura Films =

- Parent company: Iruña Films, SA
- Founded: 2002
- Founder: Eduardo Montes-Bradley
- Distributors: Heritage Film Project, Alexander Street Press
- Genre: Documentary Films
- Country of origin: Argentina
- Location: San Telmo

Contrakultura Films was an imprint of Iruña Films, SA a Buenos Aires, Argentina, film production effort dedicated to producing biographical documentaries on Latin American writers. Production offices were located in San Telmo. Soledad Liendo, Leonardo Hussen and Rodolfo Durán were among the producers. The initiative later expanded to visual artists including Andrés Waissman and Humberto Calzada, and social scientists such as León Rozitchner, Ismael Viñas, Juan Jose Sebreli and Jorge Lovisolo. Contrakultura existed between 2002 and 2006 producing approximately twenty-five documentaries with the support of INCAA, Fondo Nacional de las Artes, and the Ministerio de Cultura de la Nación. The films are owned by the Heritage Film Project and are distributed by Alexander Street Press.

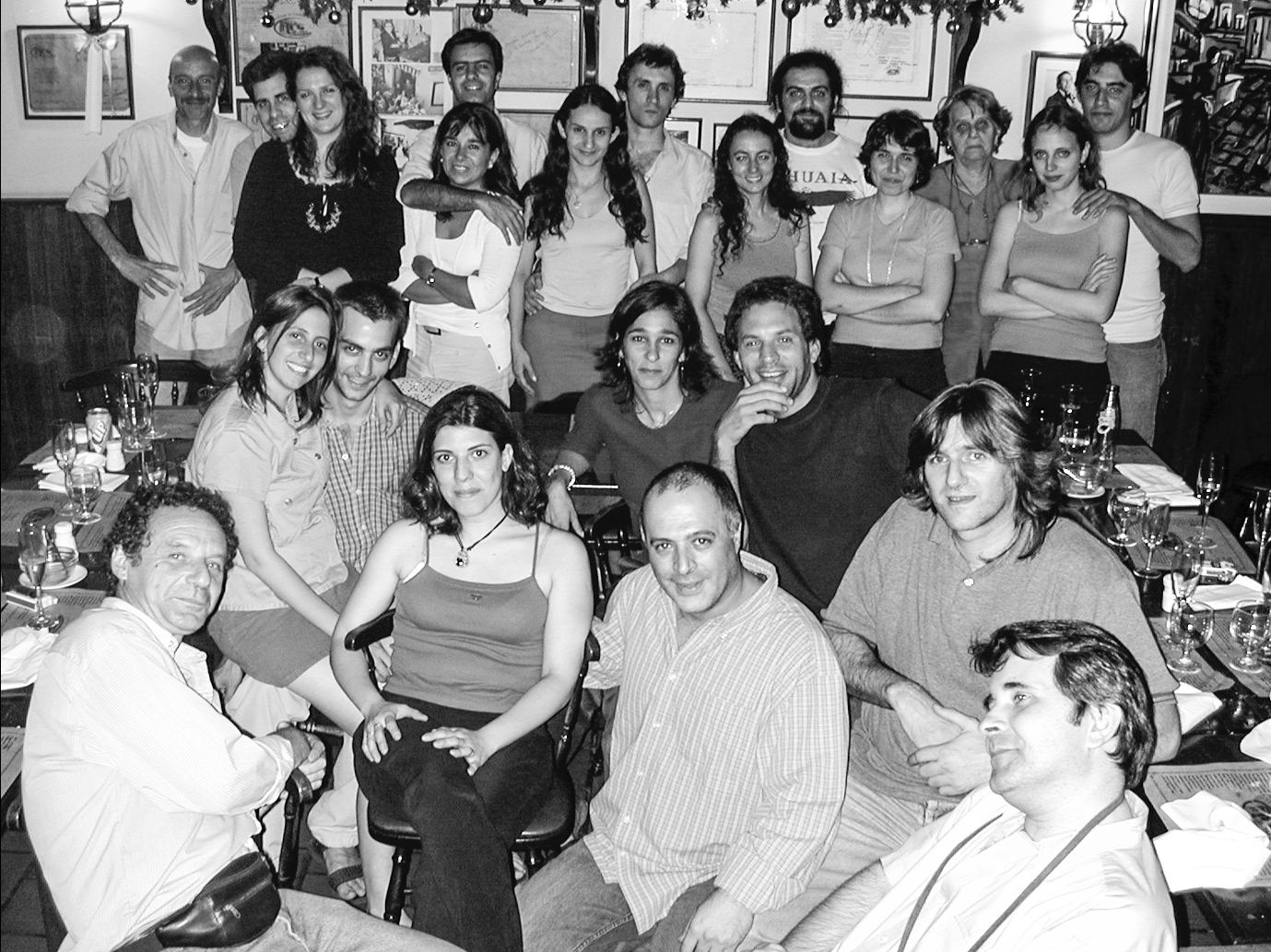
Contrakultura Staff & Crew, 2005

The initial “Contrakultural series" was known as “Perfiles”, and was made of thirteen biographical documentaries. The series was presented at the Biennial Northeast Regional Meeting "Luso-Hispanic Presence in the Changing Cultural Landscape of America", organized by the American Association of Teachers of Spanish and Portuguese at Yale University.

Several of the documentaries on the series Perfiles were directed by Eduardo Montes-Bradley. Some of the original titles are listed under a pseudonym inspired in legendary actresses of the silent era of Mexican Cinema such as Cándida Beltrán, Mimi Derba, Ana Lobos, Emma Padilla, Lupe Velez, Maria Laura del Rio, Ma. Laura Del Rio. The series was initially publicized as directed by thirteen woman-directors by Eduardo Montes-Bradley.

Contrakultura also produced the series known as the NOA Trilogy, films produced by Contrakultura and directed by Norbert “Negro” Ramírez in the Jujuy and Salta provinces, on the Northwestern region of Argentina.

== Perfiles ==
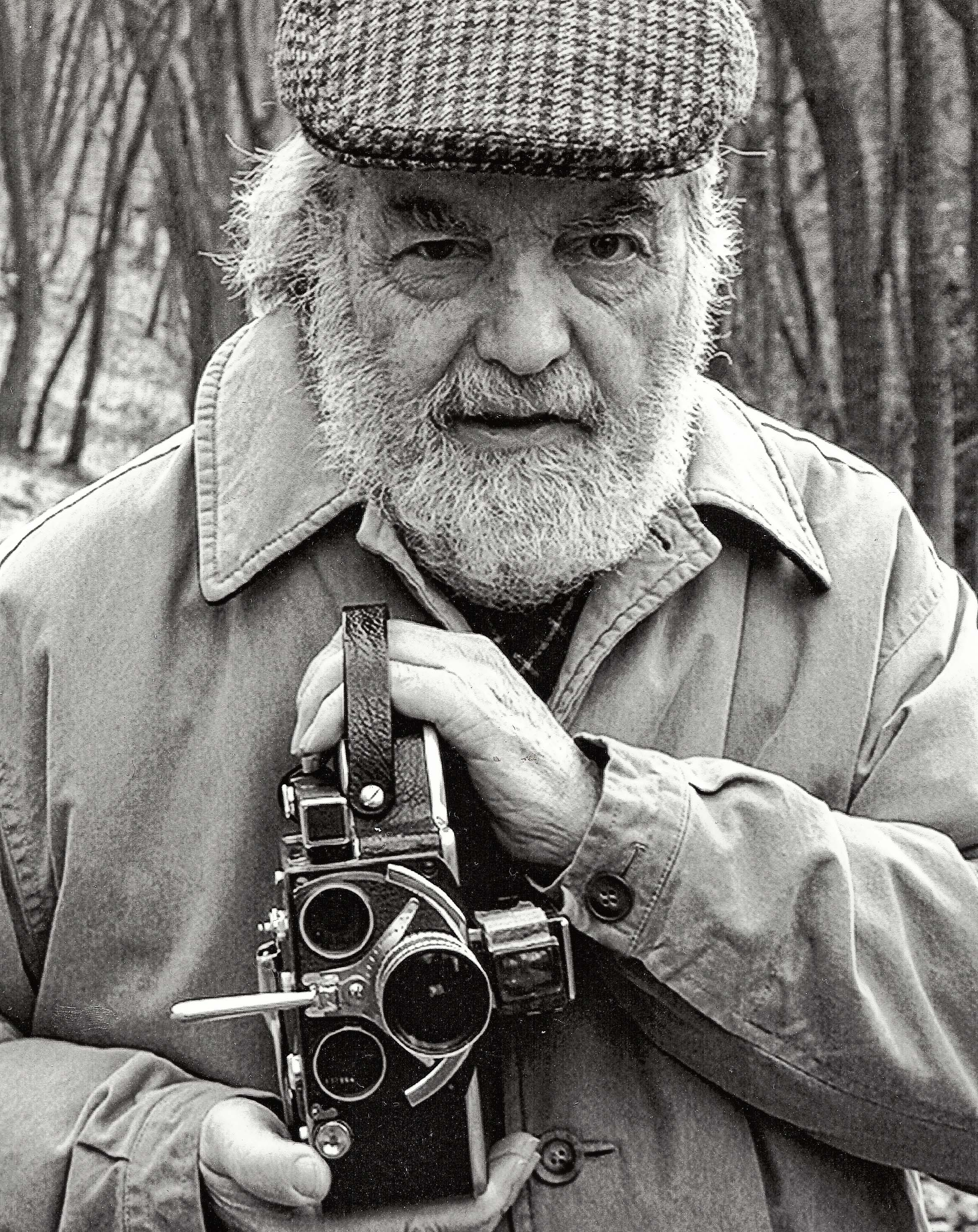
Bayer with 16mm Bolex during the filming of Los cuentos del Timonel.

Excerpt from "Soriano"

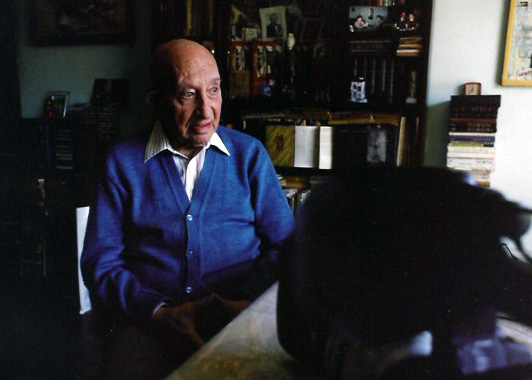
Still from the documentary film "Desandando el tiempo” with Juan Jacobo Bajarlia

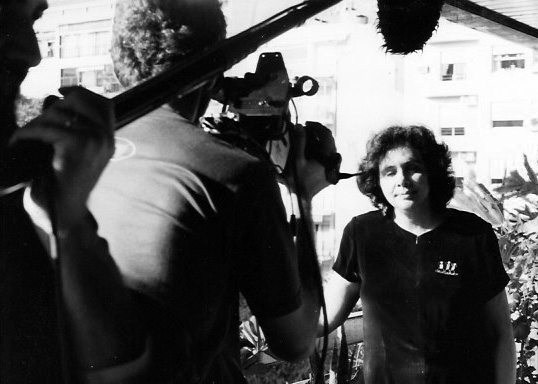
Still from the documentary film “En el nombre del padre” with Ana Maria Shua

Perfiles (Profiles), was a series of thirteen documentaries about Latin American writers produced by Eduardo Montes-Bradley for Contrakultura in Buenos Aires. Previous biographical documentaries by Montes-Bradley include essays on Jorge Luis Borges, Cortazar: Notes for a Documentary, Osvaldo Soriano and Osvaldo Bayer. The series Perfiles was initially made of thirteen tiles of 80 minutes each. The average budget for each of the documentaries was $65,000 of which 25% came as advance distribution fees advance from Patagonia Film Group, LLC, and 75% was subsidized by the Ministry of Culture of Argentina. More titles were eventually added to the original thirteen.

- Una cierta mirada (A Certain Look), 2004. Conversations with Juan José Sebreli. Sebreli recalls his life ass he takes the audience for a ride around timeless Buenos Aires, the architectural and sociopolitical landmarks that define his early childhood, adolescence and the rest of his life. In a way, this doc can be watched as a 20th-century Tour Guide of Buenos Aires, a sketch on Peronism and yet, more. Sebreli's perception of the surroundings, the arts, architecture and the music of the city is a constant throughout the film. Shot in Black and White. Particular emphasis is given to the fundamental changes that took place in the urban transformation of the capital city from single homes in the barrio of Constitución to the apartment buildings that came in response to the population growth. Sebreli also approaches the transition from Art Nouveau to Art Deco, and the architectural evolution of Theaters and Movie Theaters. Another constant reference in the film is to the gay life in Buenos Aires through his lifetime.
- Le mot Juste. Conversations with Héctor Tizón. The documentary, directed by Eduardo Montes-Bradley, follows the writer to Yala, birthplace and home of Héctor Tizón in Jujuy, Argentina. In a series of candid conversations, Tizón evokes his childhood, and the experience of living between two extremely different cultures: the Quechua the cosmogonies of his native homeland, and the Spanish of the conquistadores perpetuated to this day through the characterization of the Argentine national pride. In Le mot Juste Tizón explores the idea of exile in different directions with particular emphasis to the exile of the native peoples of the Puna under the cultural prevalence of the Spanish Culture and Catholic traditions. Tizón also talks in this film about his personal experience in a different exile, the one that forced him to leave Argentina during the military regime of Jorge Rafael Videla.

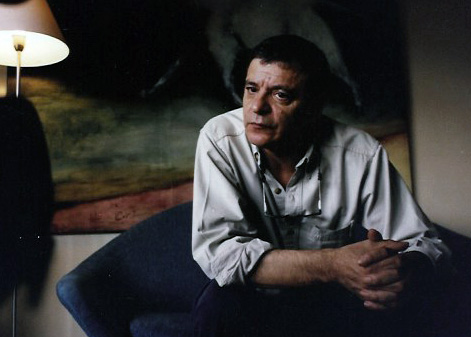
Still from the documentary film “La otra orilla” with Luis Gusman

- La otra orilla (The Opposite Shore) Biographical sketch on psychotherapist Luis Gusmán, member of Revista Sitio and writer-member of the generation of Osvaldo Lamborghini and Germán García. Gusmán is a Konex Award recipient. La otra orilla follows Gusmán from his native Avellaneda, in the peripheral and less privileged southern suburbs of Buenos Aires, to the middle class-hipster Palermo in the capital city. The film includes previously unknown tango recordings of Luis Gusmán's father. The actual interviews with Gusmám were conducted behind the camera by film student Yael Szmulewicz under the supervision of Montes-Bradley, camera by Alejandro Ortiz, Sound by Horacio Almada. DV | 70 min. and 70 min. version.
- Planeta Bizzio, (Planet Bizzio) Documentary on the life and works of Sergio Bizzio, off beat-poet, playwright and novelist. Interview conducted by Nadina Fushimi.
- Deliciosas perversiones polimorfas. An intimate portrait of Alberto Laiseca. Laiseca is a cult literary figure of Buenos Aires better known for his fictional metaphysics. The documentary explores the relationship between Laiseca and his father, a rural family doctor living in Córdoba. References to Edgar A. Poe, William Shakespeare and the imminent arrival of the Antichrist are constant leitmotivs in the film.
- Si yo fuera realmente Libre (If I Were Truly Free). Biographical essay on the life and works of Alan Pauls. Interview conducted by Daniel Guebel.
- Ecce Homo. Biographical essay on the writer, and cultural icon Juan Filloy. The film is based on an interview with Ana da Costa shortly before his death at 106 in the year 2000. Montes-Bradley's film reconstructs the life of Filloy. Contrakultura, 2004. 52 min.
- Las memorias del señor Alzheimer. The protagonist of this film is Jorge "Dipi" Di Paola, a dadaist-eccentric, writer-poet, an unconventional character of the Buenos Aires underground during the 1970s. The film was shot in 2007, shortly before Di Paola's death in Tandil, some 450 kilometers from the capital of Argentina. In the film, Di Paola, recalls the times in which he and his mentor Witold Gombrowicz shared an apartment in Buenos Aires first, and later in Di Paola's home-town of Tandil. Produced by Montes-Bradley, directed by Sergio Belloti.

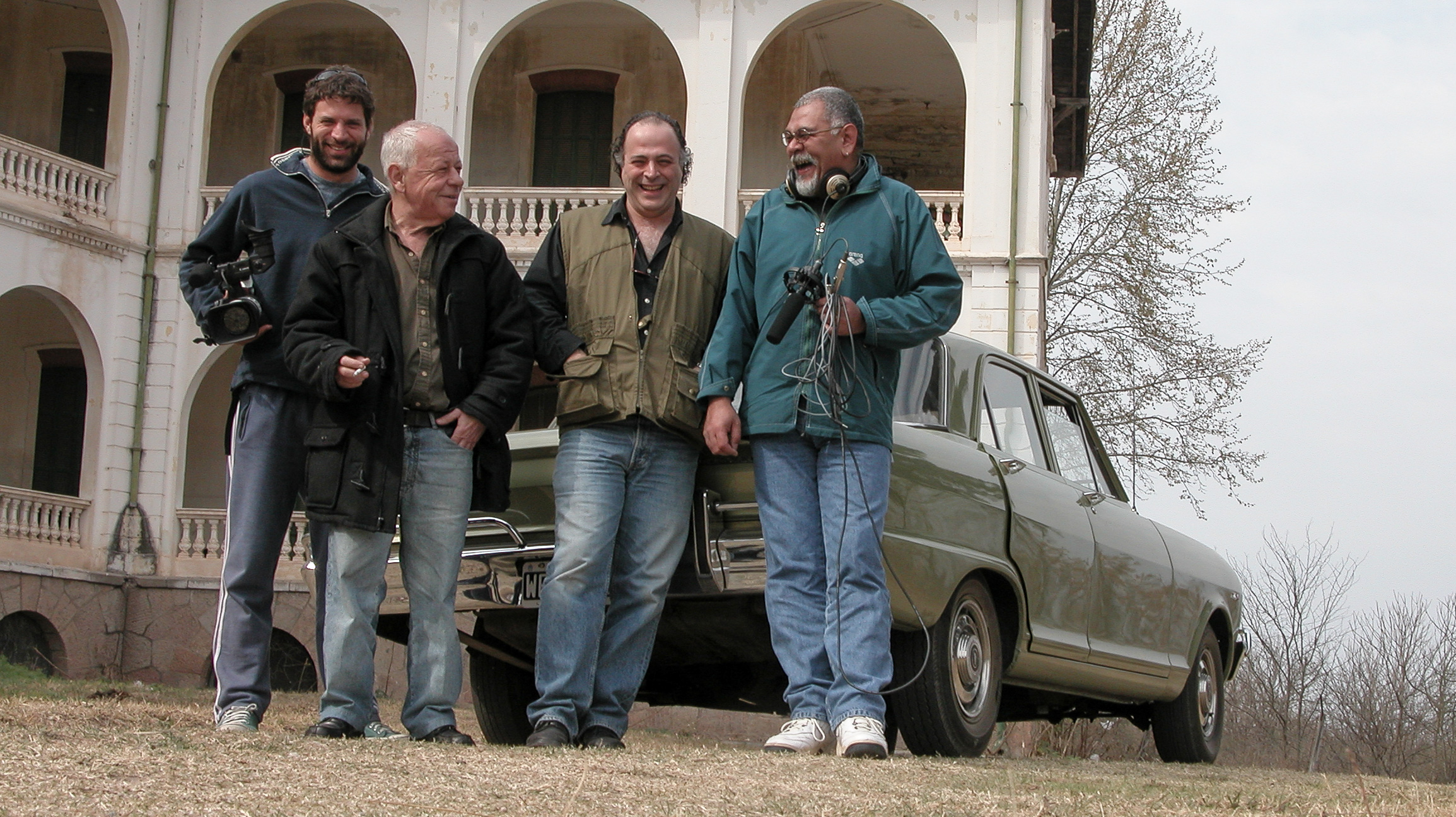
Andres Rivera and crew on the set of "Marcos Ribak a.k.a. Andrés Rivera".

- Marcos Ribak a.k.a. Andrés Rivera. Biographical portrait of Andrés Rivera author of "La revolución es un sueño eterno". The film was primarily shot in Córdoba where the author lived with his second wife Susana Fiorito. The film contributes to shedding light on Polish Jewelry immigration to Argentina, and in the political life of young members of the Communist Party in Buenos Aires during the Peronist regime (1945-1955). Many of the scenes of this film were shot at the legendary Eden Hotel, know to have served as a retreat to the former Nazi officer after the war.
- No matarás (Thou Shall Not Kill). Documentary on Marcelo Birmajer, an irreverent Jewish-Argentine writer, whose political views, largely at odds with the overwhelming "progressive"-minded cultural milieu in Buenos Aires are largely responsible for his continue political isolation. In the film, Birmajer presents himself to the audience as a lost soul somewhere between Buenos Aires and a not so distant Middle East; holding a tight grip on the umbilical cord that his Jewish-mother preserves intact for generations to-come. The film was produced shortly after the terrorist attack to AMIA and the Israel Embassy in Buenos Aires which recently gained renewed attention in the media after the presumed murder of Alberto Nisman. In the film, Birmajer accuses Iran as the primary instigator of the terrorist attacks in Buenos Aires.
- El país de no me acuerdo (Neverland). A biographical sketch on Ivan Grondona. Produced with the support of INCAA, Ministerio de Cultura, National Endowment for the Arts, City of Buenos Aires, Sociedad Argentina de Escritores, and Biblioteca Nacional Filmed scarcely two years before Grondona's passing in Buenos Aires in 2006, the film explores the political life in Argentina through the eyes of this iconic and revered actor-director who first appearance in the screen Immigrants came under the direction of Aldo Fabrizi. The film comes to a severe critique to Peronism, and what Grondona refers to in the film as "moral decay" and the "decomposition of the social fabric in Argentina". Produced by Contrakultura, 2004. Cinematography Alejandro Ortiz, Sound Horacio Almada. Directed by Eduardo Montes-Bradley as Cándida Beltrán. DV | 79 min.
- Saludablemente en pelotas. Biographical sketch on Juan Sasturain, journalist (Pagina/12), and fiction writer better known for his collaboration with comics artist.
- La célula fugitiva (The Fugitive Cell). Biographical sketch on journalist and scriptwriter José Pablo Feinmann. The title translates as "The fugitive cell" and alludes to the protagonist's survival to a cancer diagnosis during the government of Isabel Perón and the Triple A.
- Desandando el tiempo. (Unwinding Time) Biographical sketch of the poet Juan-Jacobo Bajarlía (1914-2005). Produced by Eduardo Montes-Bradley and Directed by Rodolfo Durán as "Valentina Carrasco".
- En el nombre del padre. (In the Name of the Father). Biographical sketch on Ana María Shua.
- Espléndida decadencia. (Splendid Decadence) Biographical sketch on Daniel Guebel.

=== NOA Trilogy ===
Series of three documentary films produced by Montes-Bradley with the support of the Ministry of Culture of Salta, and a grant from the National Institute of Cinema and Audiovisual Arts. The trilogy was directed by Norberto "Negro" Ramírez, a filmmaker born in Catamarca Province, and raised in Buenos Aires. During the dictatorship 1976-1983 Ramirez found refuge in the internal exile in the northwestern provinces of Argentina, a region known as NOA (Noroeste Argentino), also known as Puna, which mainly includes Jujuy and Salta provinces.

- From Frankfurt to Humahuaca. Biographical-essay on Jorge Lovisolo, a philosopher entrenched in the northwestern province of Salta; a disciple of The Frankfurt School, and author of numerous essays. The film deals with Lovisolo's obsessions in a sort of self-imposed exile in Salta; his perspectives on religion and local communities, the thoughts of Walter Benjamin, Herbert Marcuse, Theodore Adorno and others. NOA Productions, 2005.
- Kopla Vera. Biographical-essay on Jesús Ramón Vera, author of numerous verses inspired in the liturgical carnival of Jujuy. NOA Productions, c. 2004.
- Yo y el tiempo, (Time and I). Biographical-essay on poet-composer Juan José Botelli, a native and cultural icon in Salta. "Yo y el tiempo" is the third and last documentary in the NOA trilogy produced by Montes-Bradley, and directed by Norberto "Negro" Ramírez. NOA Productions, c.2006

== Media ==
- Samba on your Feet
- El hombre invisible, (The Invisible Man) The documentary explores the work of early film editors of News Reel in Argentina during the 1940s and through the 1960s.
- La oficina (The Office) A documentary by Blas Eloy Martínez, son of the laureate writer Tomás Eloy Martínez. The film is set in the background of a red-tape Office of Vital Records. Produced by Montes Bradley.
- Dirigido por ... (Directed by) This film explores the creative process of Argentine filmmakers in a series of in-depth interviews intertwined with an extensive archival of films and photography. Includes conversations with Adolfo Aristarain, Academy Award recipient Luis Puenzo, Lucrecia Martel, David José Kohon, Eduardo Montes-Bradley, Anibal DiSalvo, Daniel Burman, Mario Levin, Edmund Valladares, and others.
- Insurgentes. The documentary investigates the connections between the (Revolutionary Left Movement), the (ERP), and (Tupamaros) in the 1970s. The film also focuses on Plan Condor, the multilateral efforts by Argentina, Uruguay, and Brazil to defeat the guerrilla insurgents. The film was produced by Montes-Bradley and directed by Pablo Doudchitzky.
- Low Blows: La Raulito. This documentary follows soccer icon Maria Esher Duffau a.k.a. "La Raulito", the fan-mascot of Boca Juniors and an eccentric folk character in Buenos Aires. La Raulito as Maria Esher Duffau was known, had previously been immortalized in a film by the same name directed by Lautaro Murúa. However, in this documentary the director, a Boca Juniors fan himself, follows the protagonist during the last days of her life. Low Blows: La Raulito premiered at International Film Festival in December 2009. Latin American Selection. Produced by Eduardo Montes-Bradley, directed by Emiliano Serra.
- Negro sobre blanco (Black on White). A biographical film about Margarita Bróndolo negative cutting. Margarita recalls the pioneering times of Argentine cinema days when she was one of the first female film editor in Estudios San Miguel. At the time Bróndolo worked alongside iconic figures of the golden era of a film such as Eva Duarte. The documentary abounds in newsreels, and clips from some of the most celebrated film titles of Argentina. The film was directed by Eduardo López, himself a long time and award-winning editor next to Academy Award Nominee Adolfo Aristarain. Produced by Montes Bradley, edited and directed by Eduardo López.
