= Juan José Sebreli =

Argentine sociologist (1930–2024)

Juan José Pérez Sebreli
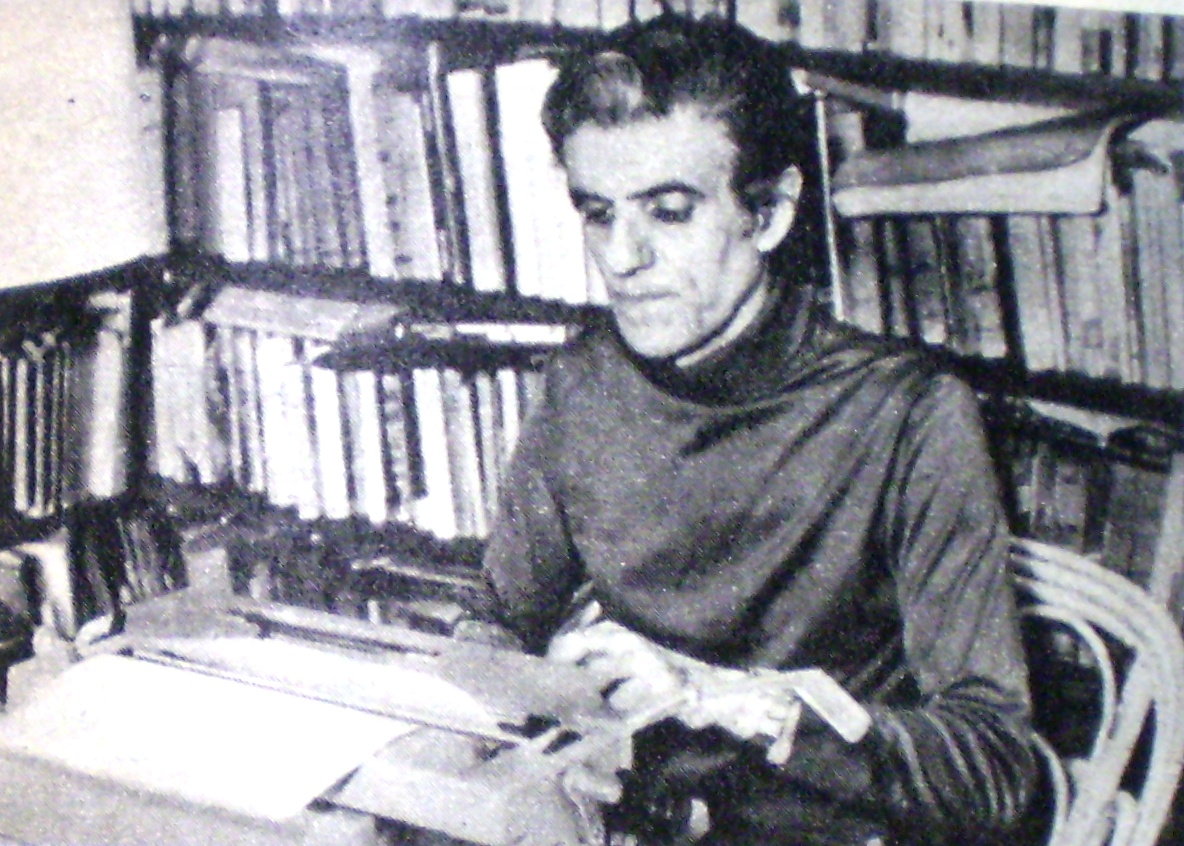
- Sebreli in 1983
- Born: 3 November 1930; Buenos Aires, Argentina
- Died: 1 November 2024 (aged 93); Buenos Aires, Argentina

Education
- Education: University of Buenos Aires

Philosophical work
- Era: 20th-century philosophy 21st-century philosophy
- Region: Western Philosophy
- Main interests: epistemology existentialism literary criticism sociology

Juan José Pérez Sebreli (Spanish: [seˈbɾeli]; 3 November 1930 – 1 November 2024) was an Argentine sociologist, essayist and philosopher. Throughout his intellectual work, he concentrated on the notions of reason, city and everyday life.

== Background ==
Inspired by Gay Power movement, he was co-founder of Frente de Liberación Homosexual ("Gay Liberation Front") along with Manuel Puig and Néstor Perlongher, in the last years of the self-called Argentine Revolution. The organization of the group was an adaptation of the democratic centralist partisan model.
In years that followed the last coup d'état he directed study groups that were called "Universidad de las Sombras" ("University of Shadows"). As suggested by its name, it had a secret status, which was a consequence of the Dirty War, that is, political persecution and forced disappearance carried out by the military government, both being crimes against humanity.
Sebreli is mainly known because of his past collaboration with cultural magazines, such as Contorno and Sur. He was a columnist for La Nación and Perfil newspapers and Ñ magazine. He engaged in several television debates with Hugo Mujica.

Sebreli was hospitalized with COVID-19, on 9 August 2020, at the Hospital Italiano in Buenos Aires. He died in Buenos Aires on 1 November 2024, at the age of 93.

== Work ==
=== Populism ===
In his work, Sebreli was radically critical of populism. His arguments are characterized by a sharp focus on the Argentine heterogeneous experiences of Peronism, a movement he describes as fascist at its core. He criticizes the figure of Juan Domingo Perón, depicting him as an authoritarian and charismatic leader, thus making use of Weberian categories of thought. Sebreli stated that the persistence of Peronism could be understood if one considers that, as a matter of fact, "there are sectors in the Argentine society that have a (pretended) lack of memory and are prone to self-deception". In one of his latest books ("El malestar en la política", 2012), he argued that Kirchnerism is a form of "latinoamerican neopopulism" and "plebiscitary caesarism", for it perfectly contrasts with a democratic republic.

=== Irrationalism ===
Sebreli is quite known for his criticism of 'irrational' theoretical inquiries. His arguments were an effort to corrode the foundations of psychoanalysis, and it is for that reason he labelled such discipline as pseudoscience, following Karl Popper, as it lacks a proper scientific method. He asserted that Schopenhauer is "the true father of modern irrationalism", and that along with Dostoievski and Nietzsche, he contributed to the transformation of philosophy in art, the aestheticization of life and thought.

=== Existentialism ===
Sebreli was a member of the so-called "first Argentine existentialist group" along with Oscar Masotta and Carlos Correas. He introduced Jean-Paul Sartre into the academic milieux of his time. Molded by the Hegelian and Marxist Left, he introduced the political thought of Alexandre Kojève and that of Tran Duc Thao.

== Politics ==
In 2002 he supported Ricardo López Murphy's candidacy to presidency, something he later referred to as "situational." Sebreli identified as social-democrat, "in a European sense," and more recently as a left-liberal.

In the wake of the abortion debate in Argentina, he addressed the subject expressing his pro-choice views at the Congress.

== Documentaries ==
- A Certain Regard. Contrakultura Films, 2004. Directed by Eduardo Montes-Bradley

== Bibliography ==
There are no known translations of Sebreli works to English.

- 1960: Martínez Estrada, una rebelión inútil ("Martínez Estrada, a useless insurrection")
- 1964: Buenos Aires, vida cotidiana y alienación ("Buenos Aires, everyday life and alienation")
- 1966: Eva Perón, aventurera ó militante ("Eva Perón, adventurer or militant")
- 1970: Mar del Plata, el ocio represivo ("Mar de Plata, the repressive leisure")
- 1983: Los deseos imaginarios del peronismo ("The imaginary desires of Peronism")
- 1984: El riesgo del pensar. Ensayos 1950-1984 ("The risk of thinking. Essays 1950-1984")
- 1985: La saga de los Anchorena ("The Anchorena saga")
- 1987: Las señales de la memoria ("The signs of memory")
- 1991: El asedio a la modernidad ("The siege to modernity")
- 1994: El vacilar de las cosas ("Hesitation of things")
- 1997: Escritos sobre escritos, ciudades bajo ciudades ("Writings upon writings, cities below cities")
- 1998: La era del fútbol ("Soccer era")
- 2000: Las aventuras de la vanguardia ("The avant-garde adventures")
- 2002: Crítica de las ideas políticas argentinas ("Critic of the Argentine political ideas")
- 2005: El tiempo de una vida (autobiografía) ("The time of a life. Autobiography")
- 2006: El olvido de la razón. Un recorrido crítico por la filosofía contemporánea ("The oblivion of reason. A critical tour through contemporary philosophy")
- 2008: Comediantes y mártires. Ensayo contra los mitos ("Comedians and martyrs. An essay against myths")
- 2010: Cuadernos ("Notebooks")
- 2012: El malestar de la política ("Politics and Its Discontents", probably a reference to Freud's text of similar name)
- 2016: Dios en el laberinto. Crítica de las religiones ("God in the Labyrinth. Critique of religions").
