= Dalmacio =

Dalmacio is a Spanish and Galician masculine given name, derived from Latin Dalmatius. Notable people with the name include:

- Dalmacio Iglesias García (1879–1933), Spanish Carlist politician, mostly active in Catalonia
- Dalmacio Langarica (1919–1985), Spanish road racing cyclist, and later a directeur sportif
- Dalmacio Mera (born 1970), Argentine lawyer and politician
- Dalmacio de Mur y de Cervelló (died 1456), Spanish prelate of the fifteenth century
- Dalmacio Negro Pavón (1931–2024), Spanish philosopher, academic and author
- Dalmacio Vélez Sarsfield (1800–1875), Argentine lawyer and politician

== See also ==
- Dalmacio Vélez Sarsfield, Argentina, locality in the province of Córdoba in central Argentina
