= Matías Grandis =

Argentine footballer

Personal information
- Full name: Matías Alberto Grandis
- Date of birth: 24 November 1989 (age 36)
- Place of birth: Oliva, Córdoba, Argentina
- Height: 1.80 m (5 ft 11 in)
- Position: Midfielder

Youth career
- Vélez Sarsfield Oliva
- Lanús

Senior career*
Years	Team	Apps	(Gls)
2009–2010	Atlanta	5	(0)
2010	Gimnasia de Jujuy	0	(0)
2011–2012	Naval	69	(8)
2013	Audax Italiano	0	(0)
2013	→ Curicó Unido (loan)	16	(2)
2013	→ Unión La Calera (loan)	9	(0)
2014	Naval	16	(6)
2014–2015	Curicó Unido	35	(3)
2015–2016	Deportes Copiapó	29	(4)
2016–2017	Chaco For Ever	21	(0)
2017	San Marcos	12	(1)
2018	Chaco For Ever	8	(0)
2018–2020	Francavilla	48	(3)
2020–2021	Toma Maglie	–	(–)
2021	Deportes Copiapó	10	(0)
2022	Città Di Casalbordino	–	(–)
2022–2023	Vélez Sarsfield Oliva	6	(0)
2023	Unión Sunchales	25	(0)
- * Club domestic league appearances and goals as of 17 November 2024

Matías Alberto Grandis (born 15 September 1985) is an Argentine professional footballer who plays as a midfielder.

== Career ==
Born in Oliva, Córdoba, Grandis began playing football in the youth systems of Vélez Sarsfield Oliva, Club Atlético Lanús. He started his professional career with Atlanta and next in Chile, playing for Deportes Naval, Curicó Unido, Audax Italiano and Unión La Calera, before returning to Argentina.

In 2018, he joined Italian Serie D side FC Francavilla with his brother Tomás.

In 2021, Grandis returned to Chile and rejoined Deportes Copiapó.

In 2023, Grandis returned to his homeland and joined Unión de Sunchales.

== Personal life ==
His younger brother, Tomás, is also a footballer.
