= Arrascaeta Royal Land Grant (Merced de Arrascaeta) =

1757 land concession in Argentina

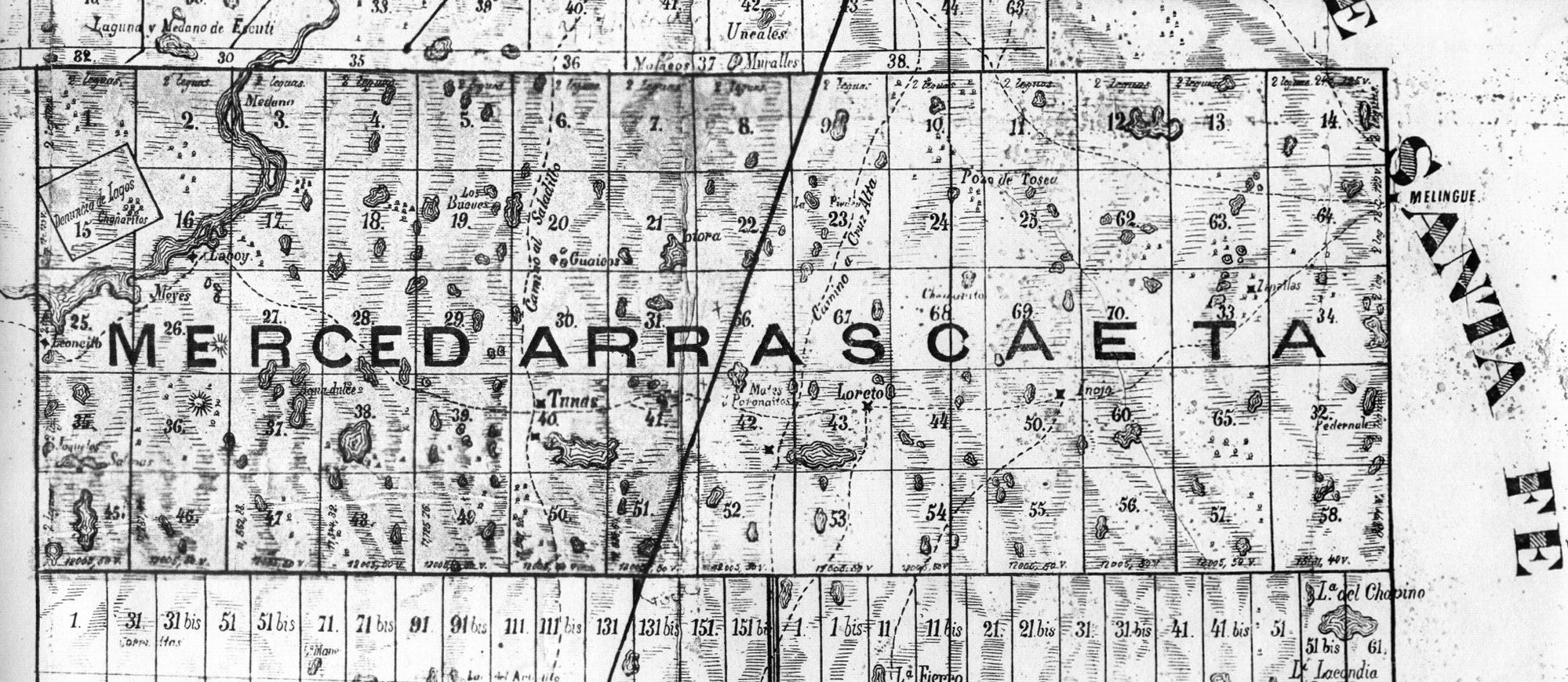
Location of the Arrascaeta land grant on the Baltar–Quesada map (1882)

The Arrascaeta Royal Land Grant (Merced de Arrascaeta) was an extensive land concession granted to Maestre de Campo Miguel Antonio de Arrascaeta and his successors, in recognition of his loyalty and of the services rendered by him and his ancestors to the Spanish Crown, in what are now Argentine territories. The concession was formalized in November 1757 and was posthumously confirmed by royal decree (cédula real) in favor of his wife and children. His descendants settled on the granted territory and inhabited it continuously for at least four generations, until the emergence of the conflict with the province of Santa Fe.

The text of the land grant detailed the scope of the rights conferred upon the beneficiaries (Miguel de Arrascaeta and his successors):

"Accordingly, and by virtue of the aforementioned powers and faculties conferred upon me, I hereby grant to you, Maestre de Campo Don Miguel de Arrascaeta, the said lands mentioned, as and in the manner and with the boundaries contained in said petition, for you and your successors, so that you may establish ranches and settlements thereon, sell them, exchange them, and transfer them as your own property, acquired by your services and those of your ancestors; and in this regard I order and command the loyal justices of this said City that, upon proof that the corresponding royal right of half annuity (media anata), based on the intrinsic value of said lands, has been paid into the royal treasury, they shall place him in possession thereof, and no person of whatever rank or condition may dispossess him of said possession without first hearing him and defeating him by law and due process, it being understood that this is a land grant."

The concession comprised a strategic territory delimited between Laguna de Chaguay (present-day La Carlota, province of Córdoba) and Laguna de Melincué (in the present-day Province of Santa Fe). According to the judicial survey approved in 1864 and upheld in subsequent litigation, its surface area amounted to 287 Castilian leagues, 1,515 cuadras, and 6,262½ square varas.

== The Arrascaeta Land Grant and Respect for Indigenous Property ==
One relevant aspect of the royal land grants issued by the Spanish Crown was the regulatory framework governing their concession, as established under the prevailing Law of the Indies.

According to the Laws of the Indies, the granting of land grants was conditioned upon respect for the territories occupied by Indigenous communities. These regulations provided that concessions could only be made over lands considered vacant or unoccupied, prohibiting the appropriation of lands possessed by Indigenous peoples. In particular, the Compilation of the Laws of the Kingdoms of the Indies of 1680 (Book IV, Title XII) established that Indigenous peoples were to retain their lands, waters, and forests, guaranteeing the means necessary for their subsistence.

Within this legal framework, royal land grants constituted titles whose validity was linked to respect for preexisting Indigenous possession, in order to prevent territorial overlap or improper appropriation.

Doctrine within the Law of the Indies has noted that these concessions were part of a legal system designed to regulate coexistence between the Spanish population and Indigenous communities, commonly referred to as the regime of the “two republics.”

== Principle of continuity of acquired property rights ==
With the organization of the Argentine State, the Assembly of the Year XIII recognized the validity of pre-existing royal titles, a criterion that was later reaffirmed by the National Constitution of 1853–1860 under the principle of legal continuity, by the Civil Code of Vélez Sarsfield in 1869, and subsequently by the Supreme Court of Justice of the Argentine Nation.

== The litigation with the provincial State ==
Around 1883, in a context of railway expansion and increasing land valuation, the province of Santa Fe proceeded to sell the lands belonging to the successors of Miguel de Arrascaeta, treating them as if they were public lands, without enabling legislation or prior compensation.

These lands were awarded to Jaime Arrufé, who a few days later transferred the titles granted by the province to Eduardo Casey, acting on behalf of a joint-stock company. Subsequently, through the auction house Adolfo Bullrich & Cía., the lands—which corresponded to the private domain of the Arrascaeta family—were put up for public auction, despite being assets belonging to a family that regional historiography identifies as part of the civic and foundational roots of the city of Córdoba.

The private nature of these lands and the irregularity of the alienation procedure were later acknowledged by the Supreme Court of Justice of the Nation in several rulings.

The lands corresponding to the Arrascaeta grant, located in a strategic area due to their proximity to ports and railway lines, were offered and promoted in regional newspapers, where their fertility and rapid revaluation were highlighted. One of the advertisements issued by the company in charge of the sale stated:

“…Moreover, with the speed at which railways and branch lines are being built in the Republic, it is evident that in a short time the population will expand extraordinarily, and then all rural property will have to triple its value….”

== The Iturraspe protest and the sale of the Loreto lands (1883) ==
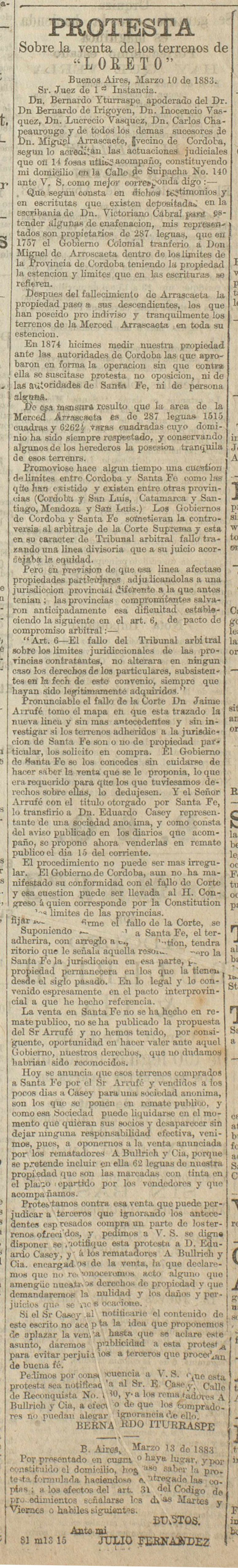
Iturraspe protest published in the newspaper The Standard on March 15, 1883

In the context of the interprovincial boundary dispute between the provinces of Córdoba and Santa Fe, on March 10, 1883, the lawyer Bernardo de Iturraspe, acting on behalf of the successors of Miguel de Arrascaeta, of Bernardo de Irigoyen, and of other holders of rights over the grant, filed a formal protest before the Court of First Instance against the sale of the lands known as “Loreto”.

In his submission, Iturraspe challenged the alienation of those lands by the government of the province of Santa Fe, arguing that they were lands of private ownership that had been offered and sold as if they were public lands. He alleged that the procedure had been irregular, since no public auction had been held and no prior verification of pre-existing property rights had been carried out.

He further stated that the royal land grant awarded in 1757 to Miguel de Arrascaeta comprised an approximate area of 287 leagues, whose possession had been exercised peacefully and continuously by his descendants for more than a century. He also indicated that in 1864 the property had been surveyed by the Arrascaeta Community and approved by the authorities of the province of Córdoba, without opposition from the province of Santa Fe or from third parties.

The protest was submitted in the context of the arbitration conducted by three provinces before the Supreme Court of Justice of the Nation to resolve the issue of their boundaries. Within that framework, Iturraspe recalled that the arbitration agreement entered into by the provinces of Buenos Aires, Córdoba, and Santa Fe included an express clause—Article 6—according to which the arbitral award “would in no case alter the rights of private individuals, existing at the date of this agreement, provided that they had been legitimately acquired.” According to his argument, that clause had not been complied with by the province of Santa Fe.

According to what was set forth in the judicial filing, once the arbitral award was rendered, a private individual named Jaime Arrufé applied to the government of Santa Fe for the purchase of lands which, according to the accompanying titles, belonged to the communal holders of the Arrascaeta grant. In his brief, Iturraspe stated that “the government of Santa Fe granted them without prior investigation into the existence of third-party rights and without sufficient publicity to allow the owners to exercise their defense”.

A few days later, the lands were transferred to Eduardo Casey, acting on behalf of a joint-stock company, and were announced for public auction. (According to historian Eduardo Míguez, PhD in history from the University of Oxford, Casey likely became one of the principal land speculators of the 1880s.)

As a result, Iturraspe formally opposed the announced auction, requested that his protest be notified to potential buyers and auctioneers, and warned that he would bring actions for nullity and for damages.

== Judicial ruling and subsequent consequences ==
As a result of these circumstances, the descendants of Miguel de Arrascaeta brought legal actions against the province of Santa Fe. In 1913, the Supreme Court of Justice of the Nation ruled in favor of the Arrascaeta family, recognizing the validity and full force of the original titles, the right of ownership, and ordering the province to pay the corresponding compensation, in what is known as the Iturraspe decision (1913).

Nevertheless, subsequent historical and administrative records indicate that the province of Santa Fe did not effectively comply with what was resolved by the highest court, both with regard to the guarantee established in Article 6 of the interprovincial arbitration agreement and to the compensatory award ordered in the 1913 ruling, with the situation persisting of heirs who would not have been compensated.

== See also ==
- Miguel Antonio de Arrascaeta
