= Waissman =

- Promotional artwork
- Genre: Biography
- Written by: Eduardo Montes-Bradley
- Directed by: Eduardo Montes-Bradley
- Starring: Andrés Waissman
- Country of origin: United States
- Original language: English

Production
- Producer: Soledad Liendo
- Cinematography: Eric Elizondo
- Running time: 30 minutes
- Production company: Heritage Film Project

Original release
- Network: WPBT
- Release: November 23, 2010

Waissman is a documentary film by Eduardo Montes-Bradley featuring the life and works of Argentine artist Andrés Waissman. The film was entirely shot in Palermo a district of Buenos Aires where Andrés Waissman and his wife, art-dealer Gachi Prieto, live and work.

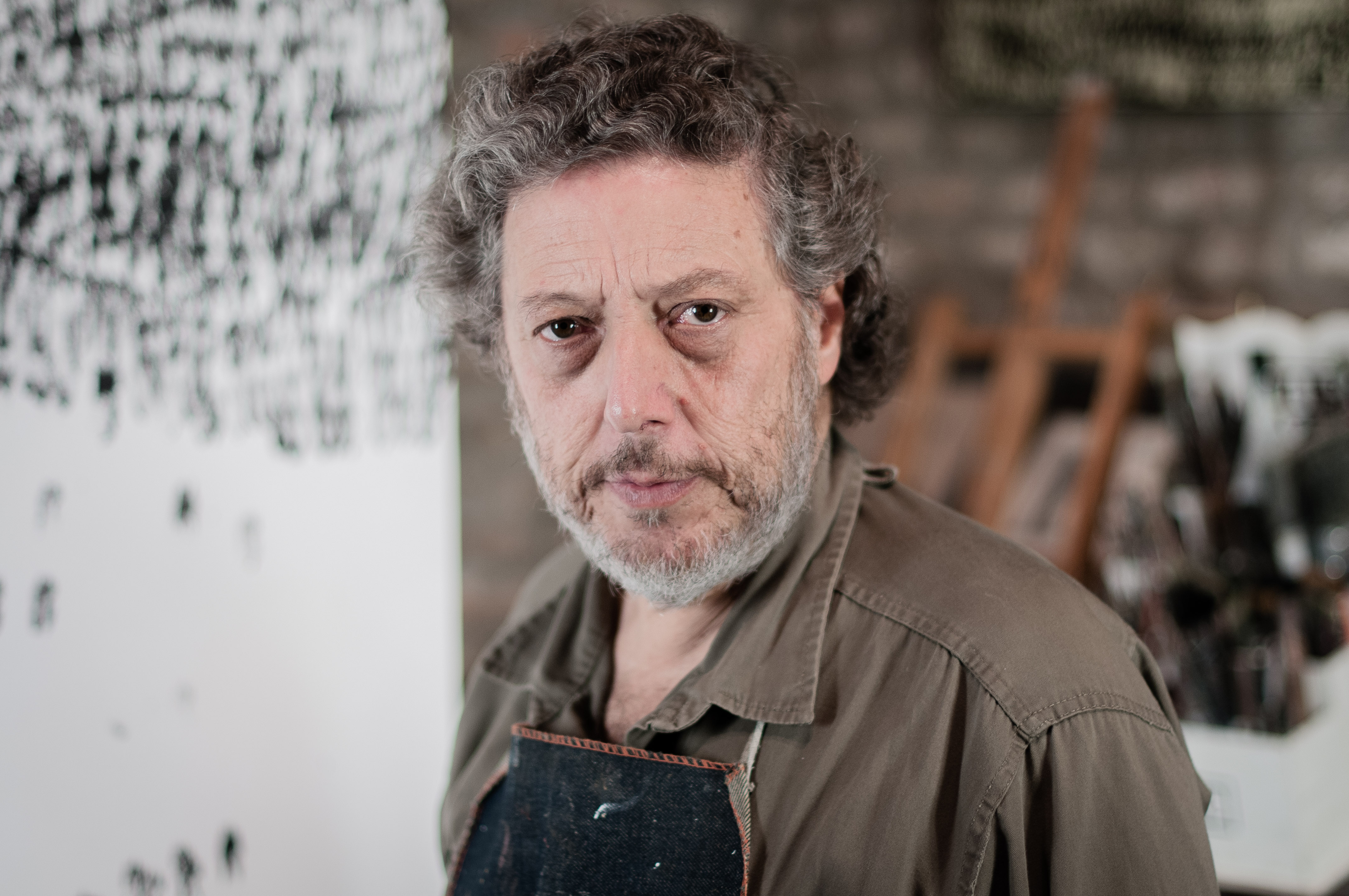
Andres Waissman, production still

Waissman was produced by Heritage Film Project as part of series of biographical portraits on contemporary artists from the Americas. The series included previous portraits of Calzada, Ernesto Deira, Pérez Celis, and John Borden Evans.

Waissman premiered on November 23, 2010, on WPBT Channel 2 (PBS), and shown at the Museo de Arte Latinoamericano de Buenos Aires (MALBA) on November 26, 2010.

== Synopsis ==
From the intimacy of his atelier in the suburbs of Buenos Aires, Andrés Waissman reveals the complex circumstances that contributed to shape his life-time canvas. The fundamental theme of his focus are multitudes, displacement, exodus, ships and migrants, and the diaspora of Jewish in search of the Promised Land. The theme of human tragedy, and Human Rights coexists with the unreal or surreal universe of mythological mammoths, and other fascinating creatures. The attempts to reveal the relationship between the creator and his creatures.

HD | 30 min. | English Distributed by Alexander Street Press and Kanopy
