= Miguel Antonio de Arrascaeta =

Spanish military officer (1719–1767)

- Born: January 21, 1719; Córdoba, Governorate of Tucumán, Viceroyalty of Peru
- Died: July 9, 1767 (aged 48); Fuerte del Sauce frontier, Viceroyalty of Peru
- Cause of death: Killed in action
- Occupations: Soldier and explorer
- Known for: Holder of the Arrascaeta royal land grant (1757)
- Spouse: María Josefa Ferreyra de Aguiar
- Children: Justo Lorenzo de Arrascaeta; María del Carmen de Arrascaeta; María Bárbara de Arrascaeta
- Parent(s): Antonio de Arrascaeta y Hemasabel; Micaela Ferreyra de Acevedo

Miguel Antonio de Arrascaeta (Córdoba, 21 January 1719 – Fuerte del Sauce, 9 July 1767) was a Spanish military officer and explorer who served in the Governorate of Tucumán, then part of the Viceroyalty of Peru, during the reigns of Ferdinand VI (1746–1759) and Charles III (1759–1788).

He attained the rank of Maestre de Campo in the militias of Córdoba and led several expeditions into the Gran Chaco as part of the peace and defense policies implemented along one of the most unstable frontiers of the colonial domain. According to expedition diaries, Miguel de Arrascaeta carried out explorations in the Chaco with the assistance of the cacique Colompotop, referred to in the sources as a “friendly and allied Indian.”

In a letter sent to the Viceroy of Peru in 1766, the Governor of Tucumán, Juan Manuel Campero, praised his merits, training, and military discipline, considering him capable of "competing with the most seasoned veterans."

In recognition of his services—and those of his ancestors—to the Spanish Crown, Arrascaeta was granted a royal land grant (merced real) for himself and his successors. In the text of this grant, he stated that he had served "from my earliest years [...] at my own expense and without pay," and that his ancestors had served the Crown "in all the political and military offices held by this city since its first founding".

== Origins and family ==
He was the son of maestre de campo Antonio de Arrascaeta Hemasabel and Micaela Ferreyra de Acevedo. He belonged to one of the founding families of Córdoba, as recorded in the royal land grant documents, which note that his ancestors rendered political and military services to the Spanish Crown since the city's original founding.

He was baptized on 7 February 1719 at the Córdoba Cathedral, with maestre de campo Francisco de Villamonte and his sister Sabina as godparents.

He married María Josefa Ferreyra de Aguiar on 3 October 1745 at the Cathedral of Our Lady of the Assumption in Córdoba del Tucumán.

== Participation of Miguel Antonio de Arrascaeta in the defense and early formation of La Carlota ==
Miguel Antonio de Arrascaeta was one of the key figures in the origins and early consolidation of the settlement of Punta del Sauce—present-day La Carlota—within one of the most unstable areas of the southern frontier of the jurisdiction of Córdoba del Tucumán, a region characterized by recurrent attacks and the fragility of colonial defensive structures.

Historian Raúl López, a member of the Municipal Historical Board of La Carlota, has highlighted Arrascaeta among those individuals who played a strategic role in the historical formation of the settlement.

During the 16th century, the Punta del Sauce area was regarded as a zone of transit and hunting, with no permanent Indigenous occupation. This situation changed in the early 18th century, when neighboring Indigenous groups—particularly the Pampas—adopted the systematic use of the horse, significantly increasing their mobility and capacity to conduct incursions into frontier territories. From that point onward, attacks known as malones were recorded, recurrently affecting both settlers and interregional routes.

As noted by López, these incursions involved cattle raiding and the capture of people, including women subjected to forced reproduction and children taken as captives. Adult men, in general, were not killed unless they offered resistance.

In response to this situation, in 1752 Governor Juan Victorino Martínez de Tineo ordered the construction of a fort in the Maldonado area, west of the current urban location.

Within this context, Miguel Antonio de Arrascaeta proposed the construction of a second fort at the core of the settlement—on the site of what is now the main square—as well as the demarcation of residential plots for settlers in its surroundings. These measures facilitated permanent settlement and contributed to the consolidation of a stable urban nucleus.

Raúl López describes the defensive system of Punta del Sauce as a precarious containment line, sustained by a small number of militiamen, which severely limited its ability to effectively prevent incursions in one of the most exposed sectors of the colonial frontier.

== Appointment as commander ==
In 1757, at the request of the residents of Cruz Alta, the governor of the Province of Tucumán, Joaquín de Espinosa y Dávalos, appointed Miguel Antonio de Arrascaeta—then holding the rank of maestre de campo—as commander general of the Fort of El Sauce. The fort was located along the so-called Pampas del Sur route, referred to in historical sources as the “Road of Death” due to its extreme danger.

Documentary evidence indicates that acceptance of this post was not merely an honorary appointment, but entailed an active military commitment and continuous exposure to frontier risks. During the same period, Arrascaeta was granted a royal land concession (merced real), understood as recognition for services rendered and as a means of securing land rights for his desce

== Diplomacy and Indigenous policy ==
Arrascaeta's activities formed part of broader efforts to secure pacification through agreements with Indigenous peoples, in accordance with prevailing derecho indiano, which regulated relations between the Spanish Crown and Indigenous communities and recognized local authorities (caciques) within their ancestral territories.

The Recopilación de Leyes de los Reinos de Indias (1680) established in Book IV, Title XII, Article 20 the so-called Order to Avoid War and Violence, which prohibited unjustified warfare and dispossession against Indigenous peoples.

== Grant of a royal land concession in 1757 ==
In recognition of his loyalty and of the services rendered in war, the governor and captain general granted Miguel Antonio de Arrascaeta and his descendants a land concession that would bear his name. The official deed, countersigned by the deputy secretary of government José Justo Guerrero and the secretary Joaquín Espinosa—by mandate of His Majesty—formalized the concession in November 1757. It was later confirmed by a royal decree (cédula real) in favor of his wife and children.

The text of the grant specified the scope of the rights conferred upon the beneficiary:

“Accordingly, and by virtue of the aforementioned powers and faculties conferred upon me, I hereby grant said concession to you, Maestre de Campo Don Miguel de Arrascaeta, of the aforementioned lands, as described and with the boundaries contained in the said petition, for you and your successors, so that you may establish estates and settlements upon them, sell them, exchange them, or otherwise dispose of them as your own property, acquired through your services and those of your forebears. In this regard, I order and command the loyal judicial authorities of this said city that, upon proof of payment into the royal treasury of the corresponding half-annuity royal tax (media anata), calculated on the intrinsic value of said lands, they shall place him in possession thereof, and no person of whatever rank or condition may dispossess him of said possession without first being heard and lawfully overcome by due process, it being understood that this is a royal grant.”

The concession encompassed a strategically significant territory, bounded between Lake Chaguay (present-day La Carlota, Córdoba Province) and Lake Melincué (present-day Santa Fe Province).

== 1764 Expedition to the Bermejo River (Eighth Expedition) ==
In 1764, under orders from the Governor of Tucumán, Juan Manuel Campero, de Arrascaeta led an eighth expedition consisting of 80 men, with the aim of exploring the navigability of the Bermejo River and identifying an overland route to the city of Corrientes.

On 13 September of that year, the expedition was surrounded in the Lacangayé area by a coalition of approximately 700 Indigenous people led by the cacique Lachirikin. The situation was defused through the diplomatic mediation of the allied cacique Colompotop, who acted as an interpreter.

In a letter addressed to Governor Campero, de Arrascaeta reported that he entered into dialogue with Lachirikin, whom he identified as the “principal leader of all and protector of that nation,” and that, in order to secure peace, he “entertained” him—using his own words—by giving him “the best of the clothing I carried, 50 cattle, 15 horses, one mule, tobacco, caps, and other trifles,” extending similar gifts to the other caciques who accompanied him. In the same letter, he also mentioned preliminary agreements reached with other Indigenous leaders, including Paikín (Mocoví), Chala (Mocoví), Ladigori, and Guaquin (Toba), among others.

Nevertheless, de Arrascaeta warned of an atmosphere of “unease” among the Indigenous groups. He further noted that the soldiers expressed fear at finding themselves surrounded by such a large contingent and refused to continue the march despite the relative proximity of Corrientes.

In order to prevent this situation from being perceived by the Indigenous groups, he decided to inform all parties that the objective of the expedition—namely, the establishment of peace—had been fulfilled and that he would return to report to the governor. According to his account, the caciques then requested that Father Sandon be sent again in order to advance toward a process of reduction.

In the same letter, dated 30 September 1764 and signed by de Arrascaeta in his capacity as Maestre de Campo, the expedition leader informed Campero that he “had the honor of having penetrated the Chaco with 80 men to a point where no one had previously reached.” He added that he had drawn a map of the routes of the “Great River” (Bermejo).

The travel diary of the 1764 expedition also records the personal items handed over by Arrascaeta to cacique Lachirikin during the negotiations, including silver spurs, a fire striker, a dagger with a silver hilt, and his poncho balandrán.

This expedition made it possible to reach initial peace agreements with key Indigenous leaders, such as the caciques Lachirikin and Paikín, which would later be resumed and formalized in 1774 during the governorship of Gerónimo Luis de Matorras.

== Recognition and promotion ==
In October 1766, the governor of Tucumán, Juan Manuel Campero, submitted a formal request for the promotion of Miguel de Arrascaeta to the viceroy of Peru, Manuel de Amat y Junyent, documented under n 625. In this document, Campero highlighted Arrascaeta’s military career, noting his prior appointment as adjutant general and emphasizing his “honor and singular conduct.”

According to Lic. Pablo Fridman, a researcher at CONICET, this request must be understood within the context of the so-called pacification project promoted by Campero on the Chaco frontier between 1764 and 1767.

As stated in the letter addressed to the viceroy, the initial expedition had been halted due to the scarcity of water characteristic of the winter season on the Chaco frontier, as well as the inadequate military preparation of the cavalry mounts. In light of these difficulties, the governor decided to reduce the size of the force and entrusted the continuation of the campaign toward Higuerilla to a smaller, more professionalized, and experienced detachment, placed under the command of Miguel de Arrascaeta.

In the same document, Campero emphasized Arrascaeta’s capabilities and his knowledge of the routes and movements of the Guaycurú peoples, underscoring the suitability, diligence, and military discipline of the unit under his command.

In 1766, Campero also submitted a report to the official Arriaga—later transcribed in the Compendium of Royal Orders (1777–1780) of the Secretariat of the Chamber and the Viceroyalty of Lima—in which he requested that de Arrascaeta be granted command of arms of the city of Córdoba.

Fridman notes that in these documents Campero composed a detailed account of the services and merits of his lieutenant, employing— in his own words—“exuberant appreciative marks” to emphasize his military qualities, whom he considered capable of “competing with the most seasoned officers” by virtue of his training and experience in campaigns related to interethnic relations. The letters also mention Arrascaeta’s role in leading expeditions into the Chaco between 1764 and 1765, as well as references to “a considerable number of Indians requesting reduction” in Salta and Santa Fe.

== Death ==
Regional historiography has noted that Miguel de Arrascaeta was assigned to high-risk military campaigns in the Chaco, conducted under extremely precarious material conditions, due to the lack of immediate funds in the Caja de la Sisa and the political tensions between Juan Antonio de la Bárcena (royal standard-bearer) and Governor Campero.

In particular, during the 1764 expedition, the troops under his command were equipped with clearly insufficient resources to cope with the arid conditions and severe water shortages, while advancing toward an active conflict zone in the Chaco Gualamba.

This situation was later recalled by Gerónimo Luis de Matorras in his Diary of the expedition undertaken in 1774 to the lands of the Gran Chaco, when reflecting on the 1764 campaign. Matorras stated that “any form of defense would have been impossible, as Arrascaeta’s eighty men carried very little ammunition, and on that day each man had scarcely two cartridges.”

The Maestre de Campo died on 9 July 1767 in the vicinity of Fort del Sauce (present-day Córdoba), following an ambush by Pampa groups, in which Arrascaeta lost his life along with thirty-seven of his men.

After his death, the land grant was confirmed by royal decree (Real Cédula) in favor of his widow and children, whose descendants settled on and inhabited the lands for four generations. With the organization of the Argentine state, the Assembly of the Year XIII recognized the validity of pre-existing royal titles, a criterion later reaffirmed by the National Constitution of 1853–1860 under the principle of legal continuity, and by the Civil Code of Vélez Sarsfield in 1869.

== Litigation with the Provincial state ==
By around 1883, in a context marked by rapid railway expansion and the rising valuation of land, the Province of Santa Fe auctioned privately owned lands as if they were public (state-owned) property, without enabling legislation or prior compensation.

The lands corresponding to the Arrascaeta land grant (Merced de Arrascaeta), strategically located due to their proximity to ports and railway lines, were offered and promoted in regional newspapers highlighting their high fertility, after having been sold to a private individual, Jaime Arrufé.

== Ruling of the Supreme Court of Justice of the Nation (Iturraspe, 1913) and Subsequent Consequences ==
In response to these circumstances, the descendants of Miguel de Arrascaeta initiated legal actions against the Province of Santa Fe. In 1913, the Supreme Court of Justice of the Nation ruled in favor of the Arrascaeta family, recognizing the validity and full legal force of the original titles, affirming the right of ownership, and ordering the province to pay the corresponding compensation (a decision commonly known as the Iturraspe ruling, 1913).

However, various historical and administrative records indicate that the province did not fully comply with the Supreme Court’s decision, leaving some heirs without the compensation ordered by the Court.
