= Carnerillo =

- Village
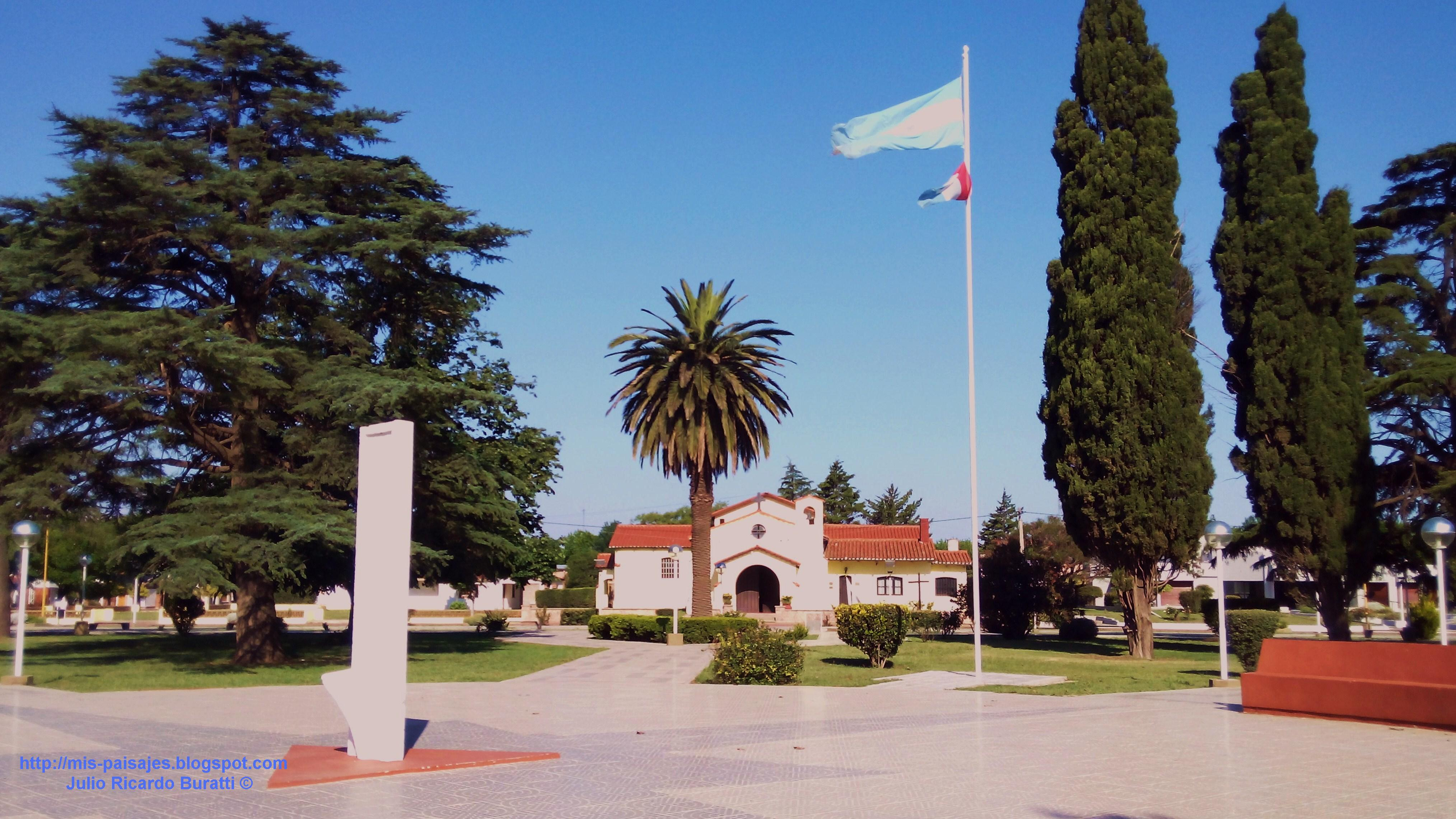

- Location of General Cabrera in Argentina Carnerillo (Argentina)
- Coordinates: 32°55′24″S 64°1′8″W
- Country: Argentina
- Province: Córdoba
- Department: Juárez Celman

Government
  - Intendant: Ariel Oscar Dalmasso (UCR)
- Elevation: 303 m (994 ft)

Population (2010)
  - Total: 1,867
- Time zone: UTC−3 (ART)

Carnerillo is a village located in the Juárez Celman Department in the Province of Córdoba in central Argentina. It is located on the RN 158, 45 kilometres (28 mi) from the city of Río Cuarto. The main economic activity is livestock and agriculture.
