= Hugo Mujica =

Argentine priest & poet (born 1942)

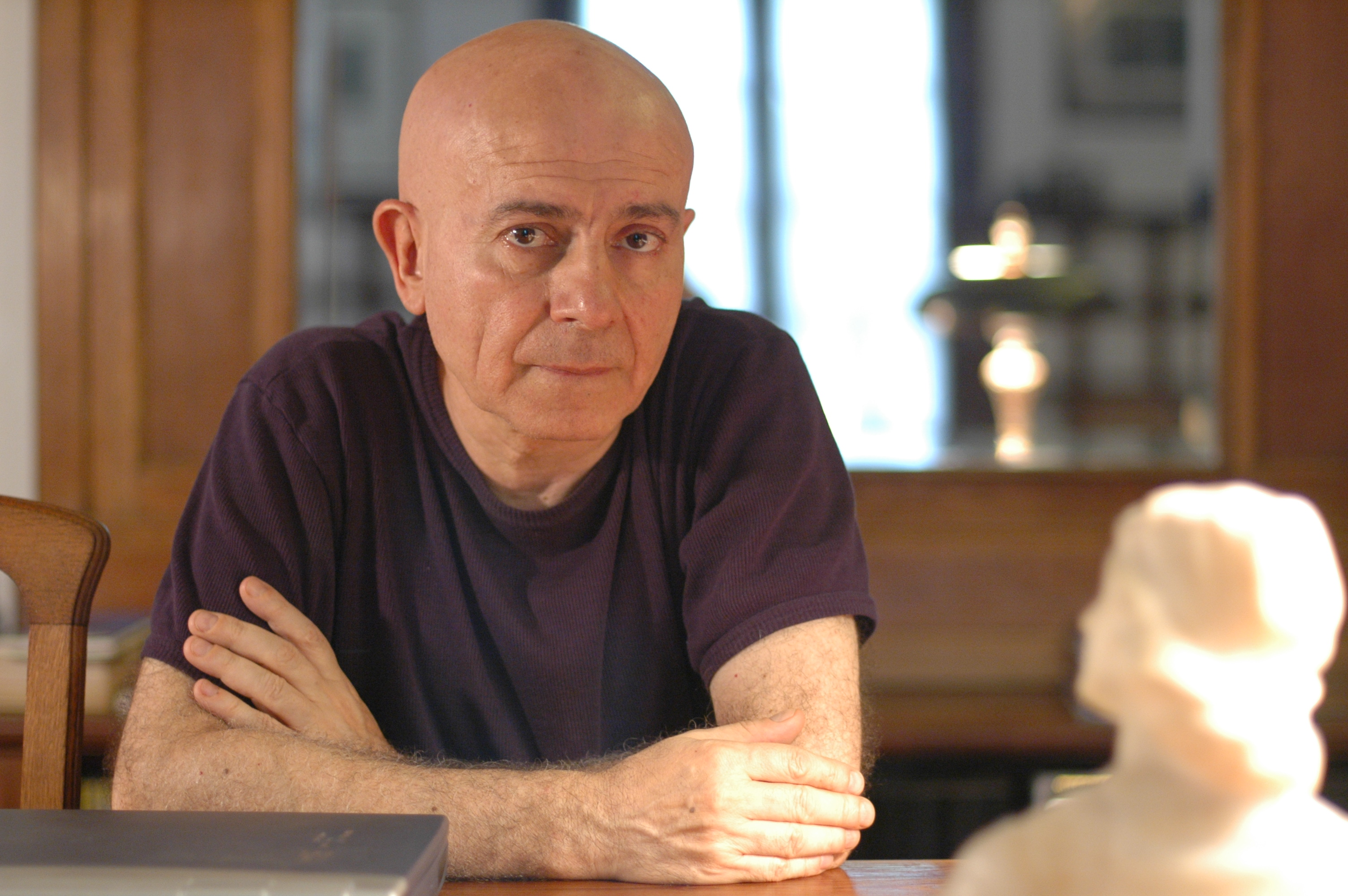
- Mujica in 2006
- Born: 30 August 1942 (age 83); Avellaneda, Buenos Aires Province
- Occupations: priest, poet, writer
- Writing career
- Language: Spanish
- Years active: 1983-present
- Subjects: Void, mysticism, creativity
- Notable awards: XIII Casa América Prize on Hispanic American Poetry
- Website: hugomujica.com.ar

Hugo Mujica (born 30 August 1942) is an Argentine Catholic priest, poet, writer, and former Trappist monk.

== Biography ==
Mujica was born in Avellaneda, a neighborhood near the city of Buenos Aires, to an anarchist syndicalist father. As his father became blind after a work accident when Mujica was only thirteen years of age, he began to work in a glass factory, continuing with high school at night school. At the same time he pursued studies in Fine Arts. Amidst the fervour of the sixties he settled in Greenwich Village, New York. There he began to study philosophy at the experimental Free University of New York, and resumed painting at School of Visual Arts. He was an active painter until the final years of the sixties when, following his own account, 'painting left me'.

He briefly experimented with marijuana and LSD, part of the scene in those days. He briefly met Ralph Metzner, who helped to publish one of his drawings. He was irreligious most of his young years, but that changed with his encounter with Swami Satchidananda. He converted to Catholicism when contemplating monastic life. During a trip along with Satchidananda, only a week after the festival, he became acquainted with the monastic life of the Trappist monastery. Joining shortly thereafter, he lived under vow of silence for seven years. He travelled to a French monastery of the same order. He began to write poetry during his time of monastic asceticism, after three years of having joined the order.

He visited Mount Athos, Greece, to experience the way of the Eastern Hesychast tradition. He travelled to Europe one more time, and having returned to Argentina finally settled down. He spent a year in solitude in a countryside located in General Alvear, where he wrote his biography only to put it in the trash. He later came back to the city of Buenos Aires, joined seminary and in little time he became a priest. He studied theology and philosophical anthropology. After a few years of officiating at a parish, he left momentarily his priestly vocation and turned to writing in its entirety, along with lecturing abroad and engaging in poetic festivals.

He participated in a TV debate with Gilles Lipovetsky, along with Juan José Sebreli, criticizing the complacency of the French philosopher regarding market economy.

== Premios y reconocimientos ==
- 2026. La Presca Ioannes Paulus Bressensis al mérito poético. Círculo de poesía. Mexico.
- 2025. XVIII Premio Loewe. España
- 2025. Premio Lerici Pea “alla Carriera”. Italia.
- 2017. Festivalul International de Poezie 2017. Premiul “Tudor Arguezi”. Române.
- 2013. Premio: XIII Premio Casa de América de Poesía Americana. 2013 (“Cuando todo calla”)
- 2010. Premio Gente de Letras. Esteban Echeverria 2010
- 2004. Premio: Gran Premio de honor Fundación Argentina de la Poesía. 2004
- 2004. Premio: Premio Letras de Oro. Honorart 2004
- 2002. Premio vocación académica. (Humanidades) Fundación El Libro y Lázara Grupo Editor.
- 1987. Faja de Honor S.A.D.E. 1988. 1987. (Escrito en un reflejo).
- 2025. Encuentro internacional de Poesia Esteros VI, Uruguay. Poeta homenajeado.
- 2011. 14 Encuentro de Poetas Iberoamericanos. Salamanca, España. Poeta homeneajado.

== Bibliography ==
=== Poetry ===
- 2026 Las hojas, la brisa y la luz danza las sombras.(Premio Internacional Loewe 2025)Ed.Visor, España.
- 2022 En un río todas las lluvias. Ed. Visor, España.
- 2019 A las estrellas lo inmenso. Ed. Visor, España.
- 2016 Barro desnudo. Ed. Visor, España.
- 2013 Cuando todo calla. (XIII Premio Casa de América de Poesía Americana). Ed. Visor, España.
- 2011 Y siempre después el viento. Ed. Visor, España.
- 2004 Casi en silencio. Ed. Pre-textos, España.
- 2001 Sed adentro. Ed. Pre-textos, España.
- 1999 Noche abierta. Ed. Pre-textos, España.
- 1995 Para albergar una ausencia. Ed. Pre-textos, España.
- 1992 Paraíso vacío. Ed. Troquel-Estaciones, Argentina.
- 1987 Escrito en un reflejo. Ed. El Imaginero, Argentina.
- 1986 Responsoriales. Ed. El Imaginero, Argentina.
- 1984 Sonata de violoncelo y lilas. Ed. Sitio del Silencio, Argentina.
- 1983 Brasa blanca. Ed. Sitio del Silencio, Argentina.

=== Essays ===
- 2026 La pasión por lo posible. En torno a lo humano. Ed.Vaso Roto, España-México.
- 2021 Señas hacia lo abierto. Los estados de ánimo en la obra de Heidegger. Ed. El hilo de Ariadna, Argentina.
- 2018 La carne y el mármol. Francis Bacon y el arte griego. Ed. Vaso Roto, España-México.
- 2016 Dioniso. Eros creador y mística pagana. Ed. El hilo de Ariadna, Argentina.
- 2014 El saber del no saberse. Desierto, Cábala, el no-ser y la creación. Ed. Trotta, España.
- 2009 La Pasión según Georg Trakl. Poesía y expiación. Ed. Trotta, España.
- 2008 La Casa, y otros ensayos. Vaso Roto Ediciones, México.
- 2007 Lo naciente. Pensando el acto creador. Ed. Pre-textos, España.
- 2002 Poéticas del vacío. Orfeo, Juan de la Cruz, Paul Celan, la utopía, el sueño y la poesía. Ed. Trotta, España.
- 1997 Flecha en la niebla. Identidad, palabra y hendidura. Ed.Trotta, España.
- 1996 La Palabra inicial. La mitología del poeta en la obra de Heidegger. Ed. Trotta, España.
- 1992 Kénosis. Ed. Troquel-Estaciones, Argentina.
- 1991 Kyrie eleison. Ed. Troquel-Estaciones, Argentina.
- 1989 Camino de la palabra. Ed. Paulinas, Argentina.
- 1987 Origen y destino. De la memoria del poeta presocrático a la esperanza del poeta en la obra de Heidegger. Ed. Carlos Lohlé, Argentina.
- 1985 Camino del nombre. Ed. Patria Grande, Argentina.

=== Short stories ===
- 2008 Bajo toda la lluvia del mundo. Ed. Seix Barral, Argentina.
- 1990 Solemne y mesurado. Ed. Losada, Argentina.

=== Re-editions ===
- 2026 Las hojas, la brisa y la luz danza las sombras. Circulo de Poesia-Visor México.
- 2021 Señas hacia lo abierto. Los estados de ánimo en la obra de Heidegger. Ed. Vaso Roto, España-México Argentina.
- 2016 La palabra inicial. La mitología del poeta en la obra de Heidegger. Ed. Sílaba, Colombia.
- 2015 La palabra inicial. La mitología del poeta en la obra de Heidegger. Ed. UV de la Universidad de Valparaíso, Chile.
- 2014 Del crear y lo creado. 3: Ensayos, Narrativa. Vaso Roto Ediciones, España-México.
- 2014 Del crear y lo creado. 2: Ensayos. Vaso Roto Ediciones, España-México.
- 2013 Del crear y lo creado. 1: Poesía completa 1983-2011. Vaso Roto Ediciones, España-México.
- 2010 La palabra inicial. La mitología del poeta en la obra de Heidegger. Ed. Biblos, Argentina.
- 2009 Kénosis. Ed. Marea, Argentina.
- 2008 Kyrie Eleison. Ed. Guadalquivir, Argentina.
- 2005 Poesía completa -1983-2004-. Ed. Seix Barral, Argentina.

=== Anthologies ===
- 2025 A cada bosque sus hojas al viento. Nueva York Poetry Press. USA. (Antología poética).
- 2025 Umbral de la palabra. Descontexto Editores. Chile. (Antología poética).
- 2020 En la calma más serena. Ed. bi/Coa. USA. (Antología poética).
- 2020 Lluvias. Ed. Universidad Externado de Colombia. (Antología poética).
- 2019 En este asombro, en este llueve. Ed. El escarabajo. Colombia. (Antología poética).
- 2018 Donde la lejanía es adentro. Ed. Summa, Perú. (Antología poética).
- 2017 Llueve por vez primera. Ed. La Chifurnia, El Salvador. (Antología poética).
- 2017 Al alba los pájaros. Ed. El hilo de Ariadna, Argentina. (Antología poética).
- 2016 Bajo un cielo despejado. El ángel. Editor, Ecuador. (Antología poética).
- 2015 En el hueco de la mano. Ed. 3600, Bolivia. (Antología poética).
- 2014 A esta hora de la vida. Ed. Sílaba, Colombia. (Antología poética).
- 2014 Entre el aliento y la palabra. Ed. Último Round, Ecuador. (Antología poética).
- 2013 Otros bordes, otras luces. Ed. HUM, Uruguay. (Antología poética).
- 2013 Desde cada otro. Ed. Germinal, Costa Rica. (Antología poética).
- 2013 Mirando caer las lluvias. Ed. Monte Avila, Venezuela. (Antología poética).
- 2013 Lo que vive y tiembla. Ed. Universidad Javeriana, Colombia. (Antología poética).
- 2011 Cada hoja que cae. Ediciones Lar, Chile. (Antología poética).
- 2010 Fragmentos de la creación. Ediciones Monte Carmelo, México. (Antología de ensayos).
- 2009 Más hondo. Vaso Roto Ediciones, España-México. (Antología poética).

=== Translated works ===
- 2025 Alle stelle l’immenso. Ed. Sette Citta, Italia. (Poesía)
- 2024 E tutto nomina. Poesia scelte (1983-2023). Interno Poesia Ed. Italia. (Poesia).
- 2024 En un fleuve toutes les pluis. Éd. Phloème, Francia. (Poesía).
- 2022 Stare depul. Ed. Koladalli Nakshatra, India. (Antología poética).
- 2022 Boue à nu. Éd. Phloème, Francia. (Poesía).
- 2022 Tudo o que arde morre iluminando. Ed. Officium Lectionis, Portugal. (Antología poética).
- 2022 Zvezdam neizmernost. Ed. Eslovenia. (Poesía).
- 2020 Od vsega dezja seta. Ed. Lud Literatura, Eslovenia. (Cuentos).
- 2019 Fango nudo. Ed. LietoColle, Italia. (Poesía).
- 2018 Jomer eyrom. Keshev Publishing House, Israel. (Poesía).
- 2018 Ksaqirisan ri q’ij. Ed. POE, Guatemala. (Antología poética. En Maya Kiche).
- 2018 Ett paradis, tomt. Ed. Aura Latina, Suecia. (Antología poética).
- 2017 Tza txe ky’a. Ed. POE, Guatemala. (Antología poética. En Maya Mam).
- 2017 Nalex pe ri´q´ij. Ed. POE, Guatemala. (Antología poética. En Maya Kaqchikel).
- 2017 Antologia poetica 1883-2016. Ed. LietoColle, Italia. (Antología poética).
- 2016 Badmama doveret hadmama. Keshev Publishing House, Israel. (Antología poética).
- 2016 Cuando tutto tace. Raffaelli Editore, Italia. (Poesía).
- 2015 Paradise Empty. Poems 1983-2013. Arc Publications, Inglaterra. (Antología poética).
- 2015 Fiorul a celor ce se-nclina. Ed. Zip, Rumania. (“Premiul “Tudor Arguezi”) (Antología poética).
- 2015 Margens. Ed. Cosmorama, Portugal. (Antología poética).
- 2015 Poiemata. Ed. Thraca, Grecia (Antología poética).
- 2014 Vent dans le vent. Ed. Al Manar, Francia. (Antología poética).
- 2013 E sempre dopo il vento. Raffaelli Editore, Italia. (Poesía).
- 2011 Poesía. Ed. Próxima-RP, Bulgaria. (Antología poética).
- 2008 Pesmi. Ed. Kud, Eslovenia. (Antología poética).
- 2008 Poesie scelte. Raffaelli Editore, Italia. (Antología poética).
- 2008 What the embrace embraces. Coimbra Editions, USA. (Antología poética).
- 2000 Notte aperta. Antonio Pellicani Editore, Italia. (Poesía).

=== Music scripts ===
- Nuit aveugle. Opéra de chambre. Santiago Diez Fisher. Francia.
- Nadie. Voz y electrónica. Daniel Hugo Sprintz. Promúsica. España.
- Noches adentro. 3 canciones para voz y piano. Daniel Hugo Sprintz. España.
- Azot, Para recitante, coro, 9 músicos y electroacústica. Daniel Hugo Sprintz. España.
- Vision du ‘Paradis vide’. Daniel Hugo Sprintz, Francia.
- Paraíso vacío. 6 Paisajes musicales sobre poemas de Hugo Mujica. Pedro Aznar. Argentina.
- Concertino. Fabián Panisello. España.
- Poemas de Hugo Mujica. Para soprano, contralto, tenor y trios de cuerdas. Fabian Panisello. España.

=== On his work ===
- 2012 Lengua del silencio: entre Mujica y Heidegger. Lucas Andino. Ed. Académica, España.
- 2012 Orfismo y errancia: la escritura y los elementos en la poesía de Hugo Mujica. Martín Cerisola. Ed. Académica, España.
- 2012 Hacia lejanas honduras del silencio y la palabra en la poesía de Hugo Mujica. Catalina Chamorro Villalobos. Ed. Académica, España.
- 2007 El ‘Ya pero todavía no’ en la poesía de Hugo Mujica. Ana María Rodriguez Francia. Ed. Biblos, Argentina.
- 1997 Hugo Mujica. Ana Emilia Lahitte. Ed. Vinciguerra, Argentina.

=== Unedited material on his work ===
- 2016. Hugo Mujica: pensar poético. Juan Esteban Londoño Betancour. Universidad de Antioquia, Colombia.
- 2015. Los símbolos del desasimiento en la poesía de Hugo Mujica. María Leonor Gavito. Universidad de Jaén, España.
- 2015. La obra poética de Sergio Mondragón y Hugo Mujica: una mística abierta. Rafael Eduardo García González. Instituto Tecnológico y de Estudios Superiores de Monterrey, México.
- 2015. La poética del abandono divino en Hugo Mujica y su confluencia con Oriente. Carlos Andrés Sanchez Arismendy. Universidad de Antioquia, Colombia.
- 2014. “Lo abierto calla” El silencio en las imágenes poéticas del límite de Hugo Mujica. Javier Helgueta Manso. Universidad de Salamanca, España.
- 2012. Pensamiento filosófico y experiencias religiosas en la poesía argentina contemporánea. (Hugo Mujica, Héctor Viel Temperley, Hugo Padeletti, Oscar del Barco). María Gabriela Milone. Universidad Nacional de Córdoba.
- 2005. Sonata de viloncelo y lilas de Hugo Mujica. Una poética de la intemperie. Roberto Daniel Riccardo. Universidad Católica Argentina.
