= Cortazar: Notes for a Documentary =

Cortázar: Notes for a Documentary
- Cortázar: apuntes para un documental
- Directed by: Eduardo Montes-Bradley
- Written by: Eduardo Montes-Bradley
- Production company: Contrakultura Films
- Release date: December 5, 2002 (Buenos Aires)
- Running time: 78 minutes
- Country: Argentina
- Language: Spanish

Cortázar: Notes for a Documentary (Spanish: Cortázar: apuntes para un documental) is a 2002 documentary film written and directed by Eduardo Montes-Bradley about Julio Cortázar. The film is conceived as an open-ended essay —organized as a set of "notes" instead of a definitive account— and assembles home movies shot by Cortázar himself, previously unpublished photographs, fragments of feature films, and interviews with writers and intellectuals who knew or studied him.

The documentary premiered on 5 December 2002 in Buenos Aires and was widely reviewed in the Argentine press, drawing a range of favorable and skeptical responses. It was produced by Contrakultura Films with support from the National Institute of Cinema and Audiovisual Arts. The film was later screened at international film festivals, including the Havana Film Festival, and was distributed in the United States through Alexander Street Press.

== Background and production ==
The project developed alongside a book Montes-Bradley was preparing on the first forty years of Cortázar's life. Cortázar's first wife and literary executor, the translator Aurora Bernardez, gave the director access to family materials; according to Montes-Bradley she handed over more than forty reels of 8mm home movies that Cortázar had shot, which the director had to identify, decipher and catalogue, along with roughly 250 unpublished photographs. Montes-Bradley attributed his access to Bernardez's exceptional generosity.

It was Montes-Bradley's third documentary devoted to a major writer, following Harto the Borges (on Jorge Luis Borges) and Los cuentos del timonel (on Osvaldo Bayer); a film on Osvaldo Soriano is also cited among his earlier work. Several critics noted that it was the second Argentine documentary on Cortázar, after Tristán Bauer's Cortázar (1994).

The film was photographed by Raúl Domínguez, edited by Rita Clavel, produced by Rodolfo Durán, with production design by Soledad Liendo and music by Sara Kaplan. Contemporary sources give the running time as either 78 or 80 minutes.

== Content and themes ==
The film is built around a voice-over and an alternation of disparate materials rather than a linear chronology. Cortázar's own 8 mm and Super 8 home movies and his photographs document his travels and private life, among them a journey to India to visit Octavio Paz—with footage of Cortázar riding an elephant and dancing with his second wife, the writer Carol Dunlop—and a beach photograph of Dunlop. The documentary also dwells on small biographical details, such as Cortázar's military enrollment booklet, which records his middle name as Florencio. These domestic images are intercut with fragments of feature films, including Gulliver's Travels and Abbott and Costello Meet Dr. Jekyll and Mr. Hyde, used to evoke the writer's playful, childlike imagination.

Among the personal facets the film highlights are Cortázar's enthusiasm for jazz and boxing. A recurring strand is his political trajectory: his sympathy for the Cuban Revolution after his 1963 trip to Cuba, his later engagement with the Sandinista revolution in Nicaragua, and his relationship with figures such as Ernesto Cardenal and Sergio Ramírez. The film presents conflicting assessments of that commitment: the writer Ismael Viñas argues in the documentary that Cortázar was not a revolutionary but a circumstantial ally of tropical revolutions, while other interviewees stress the sincerity of his late militancy. His companion during that period, the Lithuanian-born editor Ugnė Karvelis, is also discussed.

== Interviews ==
The film includes conversations and testimony—some recorded for the documentary, others drawn from archival sources—with Tomás Abraham, Claribel Alegría, Manuel Antín, Bruno Arpaia, Osvaldo Bayer, Ernesto Cardenal, Alejo Carpentier, Rolo Diez, Horacio González, Daniel Guebel, Hugo Gutiérrez Vega, Liliana Heker, Juan Madrid, Carlos Montemayor, Juan Carlos Onetti, Octavio Paz, Sergio Ramírez and Ismael Viñas.

== Release ==
Cortázar: Notes for a Documentary opened on 5 December 2002, screening exclusively at the Cosmos cinema in Buenos Aires. It was subsequently shown at festivals in Latin America, Europe and the United States, including the Havana Film Festival, and was later distributed in the United States through Alexander Street Press for educational and library use.

== Reception ==
The film was covered in the Argentine press and received a divided response. Writing in Página/12, Luciano Monteagudo described it as a documentary conceived for debate, framing Montes-Bradley's stated aim as an effort to take Cortázar down from his "bronze" pedestal and demystify the official image of the writer. In La Prensa, Juan Carlos Fontana praised the film for focusing squarely on the writer himself. The magazine 3 Puntos gave the film a strongly positive notice, with Jorge Belaunzarán commending its honesty and its avoidance of intellectual posturing, and the critic Quintín reviewed it favourably, judging it more ambitious and personal than Bauer's earlier film.

Other critics were more reserved. In Clarín, Jorge Carnevale was sceptical of films about writers as a genre and of the film's "deconstruction" of the Cortázar myth, publishing his review under the title "Cortázar, bronce y martirologio" ("Cortázar, bronze and martyrology"). In Infobae, Catriel Etcheverri emphasised the film's interest in the intimate side of the author and in the controversial role of "committed writer" that Cortázar assumed after his encounters with Nicaragua and Cuba. The newspaper La Nación, in a preview by Julia Montesoro, presented the film as Montes-Bradley's return to the world of writers and highlighted the unpublished archival materials at its core.

== See also ==
- Julio Cortázar
- Eduardo Montes-Bradley
