= Juárez Celman Department =

Juárez Celman Department Departamento Juárez Celman
- Department
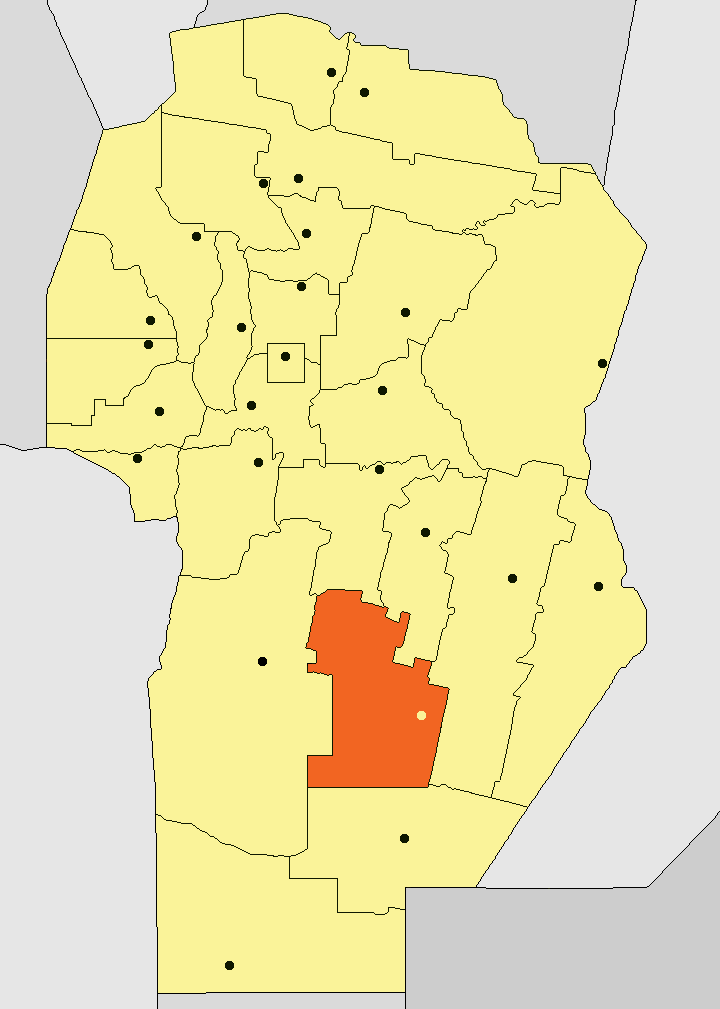
- Location of Juárez Celman Department in Córdoba Province
- Coordinates: 33°25′S 63°18′W
- Country: Argentina
- Province: Córdoba
- Pedanías: Carlota, Carnerillo, Chucul, Reducción
- Foundation: 23 July 1888
- Founded by: provincial law
- Capital: La Carlota
- Municipalities: 17

Area
  - Total: 8,902 km^{2} (3,437 sq mi)
- (5.38% of provincial total)

Population (2001 census [INDEC])
  - Total: 55,348
  - Density: 6.217/km^{2} (16.10/sq mi)
  - Pop. change (1991-2001): +7.49%
- Time zone: UTC-3 (ART)
- Postal code: X2670
- Dialing code: 03584
- Distances to
- Buenos Aires: 502 km (312 mi)
- Córdoba: 257 km (160 mi)

Juárez Celman Department is a department of Córdoba Province in Argentina. Named after former Argentine President Miguel Juárez Celman, the department has a population of approximately 55,348 inhabitants (2001 census) in an area of 8,902 km², representing 5.38% of the province's total territory. Its capital city is La Carlota.

== History ==
=== Formation ===
Until 1888, the territory that now comprises Juárez Celman was part of the vast Río Cuarto Department. On July 23, 1888, provincial legislation divided the extensive Río Cuarto territory into three separate departments, one of which was Juárez Celman. Coinciding with the department's creation, the city of La Carlota was designated as the departmental capital.

=== Namesake ===
The department is named after Miguel Juárez Celman (1844-1909), who served as President of Argentina from 1886 to 1890. Born in Córdoba, Juárez Celman was a lawyer and politician who previously served as Governor of Córdoba (1880-1883) and national senator before ascending to the presidency. His administration promoted public works and European immigration but was cut short when he became the first Argentine president to resign from office following the Revolution of the Park (Revolución del Parque) in 1890.

== Geography ==
The department is located in the southern portion of Córdoba Province, part of the Argentine Pampas region. For cadastral purposes, Juárez Celman is divided into four pedanías (subdivisions): Carlota, Carnerillo, Chucul, and Reducción. The department comprises 17 local governments, whose municipal boundaries do not encompass the entirety of the departmental territory.

== Economy ==
Like other departments situated in the Pampean plains, Juárez Celman's economy is primarily based on agricultural production and complementary industries.

The department is a major agricultural producer, with particular strength in several key sectors: Peanuts (Groundnuts): Juárez Celman is Argentina's premier peanut-producing region, contributing over 45% of the province's total peanut production. The department hosts the country's principal peanut processing facilities. Approximately 90% of Argentina's peanut production is concentrated in southern Córdoba Province, with Juárez Celman, Río Cuarto, General San Martín, Río Segundo, and Tercero Arriba as the primary producing departments. Major production centers include General Deheza and Alejandro Roca, which house significant peanut processing operations. Oilseed Processing: The department is home to a major oilseed processing complex, with facilities processing thousands of tons of soybeans, sunflower seeds, and corn. The agroindustrial complex produces vegetable oils, proteins, biodiesel, and refined glycerin for both domestic consumption and export. Dairy Industry: The presence of dairy farms and milk processing establishments represents another important component of the department's economy. Other Crops: The department also produces significant quantities of soybeans, corn, and wheat, supporting Argentina's position as a major agricultural exporter.

== Settlements ==
The department comprises 17 municipalities and communes:

- Alejandro Roca
- Assunta
- Bengolea
- Carnerillo
- Charras
- El Rastreador
- General Cabrera
- General Deheza
- Huanchilla
- La Carlota (departmental capital)
- Los Cisnes
- Olaeta
- Pacheco de Melo
- Paso del Durazno
- Reducción
- Santa Eufemia
- Ucacha
