= A Certain Regard =

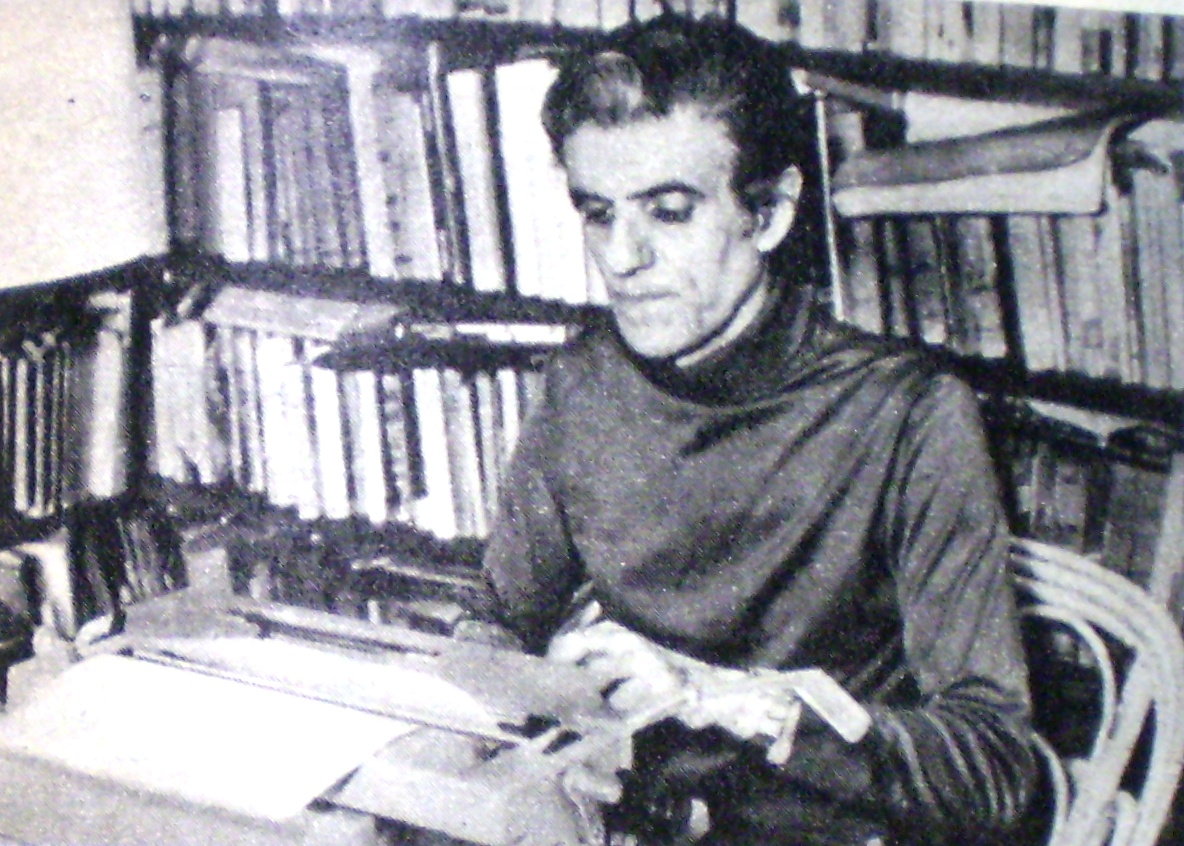
- Juan José Sebreli
- Directed by: Eduardo Montes-Bradley
- Written by: Eduardo Montes-Bradley
- Produced by: Contrakultura Films
- Release date: 2004
- Running time: 80 minutes
- Country: Argentina
- Language: Spanish

A Certain Regard (Spanish: Una cierta mirada) is a 2005 Argentine documentary film directed by Eduardo Montes-Bradley.

The film is catalogued by WorldCat.
