= La Carlota, Argentina =

City in Córdoba Province, Argentina

La Carlota
- City
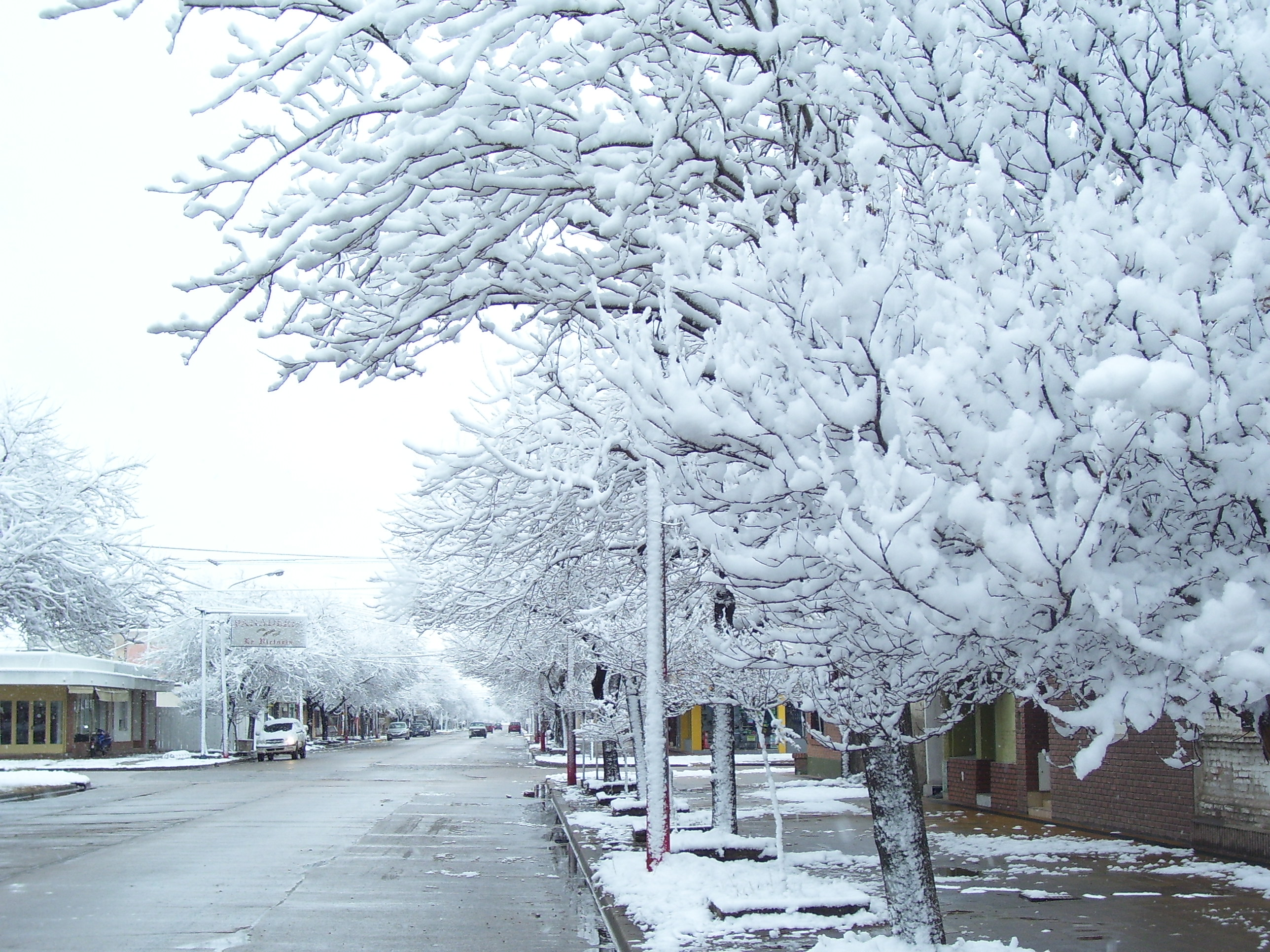

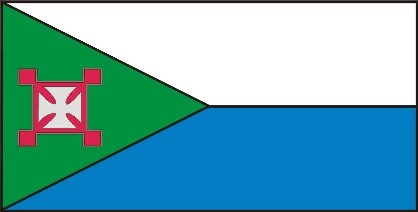
- Flag

- Location of La Carlota in Argentina
- Coordinates: 33°26′S 63°18′W
- Country: Argentina
- Province: Córdoba
- Department: Juárez Celman
- Founded: 1737

Government
  - Intendant: Natalia Bellón (PJ)
- Elevation: 147 m (482 ft)

Population (2010 census)
  - Total: 12,537
- Time zone: UTC−3 (ART)
- CPA base: X2670
- Dialing code: +54 3584

La Carlota is a city in the south of the province of Córdoba, Argentina, about 110 kilometres (68 mi) south of Villa María and 240 kilometres (150 mi) from Córdoba City. It had 12,537 inhabitants at the 2010 census [INDEC].
