= Las Perdices =

- City
- Location of Las Perdices in Argentina Las Perdices (Argentina)
- Coordinates: 32°41′56″S 63°42′16″W
- Country: Argentina
- Province: Córdoba
- Department: Tercero Arriba
- Foundation: 1887

Government
  - Intendant: Sergio Avalis
- Elevation: 270 m (890 ft)

Population (2010)
  - Total: 5,084
- Time zone: UTC−3 (ART)

Las Perdices is a city located in the Tercero Arriba Department in the Province of Córdoba in central Argentina.

== Geography ==
It is located at an elevation of approximately 270 m above sea level. The city lies within the Pampas plains (llanura pampeana), a region characterized by its flat, fertile landscape that supports extensive agriculture.

== Festivities ==
The Fiesta Provincial del Zapallo (Provincial Pumpkin Festival) is held annually in November in the town’s public square and it is one of the most emblematic local celebrations. The event features artisan fairs with pumpkin and related products (candies, jams, crafts), artistic performances, and the coronation of a Queen of the Pumpkin and her princesses.
