= Hernando, Argentina =

Hernando
- Town
- Location of Hernando in Argentina
- Coordinates: 32°25′S 63°44′W
- Country: Argentina
- Province: Córdoba
- Department: Tercero Arriba

Government
  - Intendant: Ricardo Bianchini (Juntos por el Cambio)
- Elevation: 274 m (899 ft)

Population
  - Total: 11,838
- Demonym: hernandense
- Time zone: UTC−3 (ART)
- CPA base: X5929
- Dialing code: +54 353

Hernando is a town in Córdoba Province, Argentina.

== Geography ==
It is located in the Tercero Arriba department and it is part of the Llanura Pampeana region, which is an Argentinian region with an important agricultural and livestock development. Hernando possesses fertile soils for peanut cultivation. It is located at about 274 meters above sea level, in the Pampas plains (fertile flatlands). This links to its strong agricultural base, especially its popular peanut cultivation.

== Fiesta Nacional del Maní ==
In this city, the Fiesta Nacional del Maní is held every year in November.
