= Tercero Arriba Department =

Tercero Arriba Department Departamento Tercero Arriba
- Department
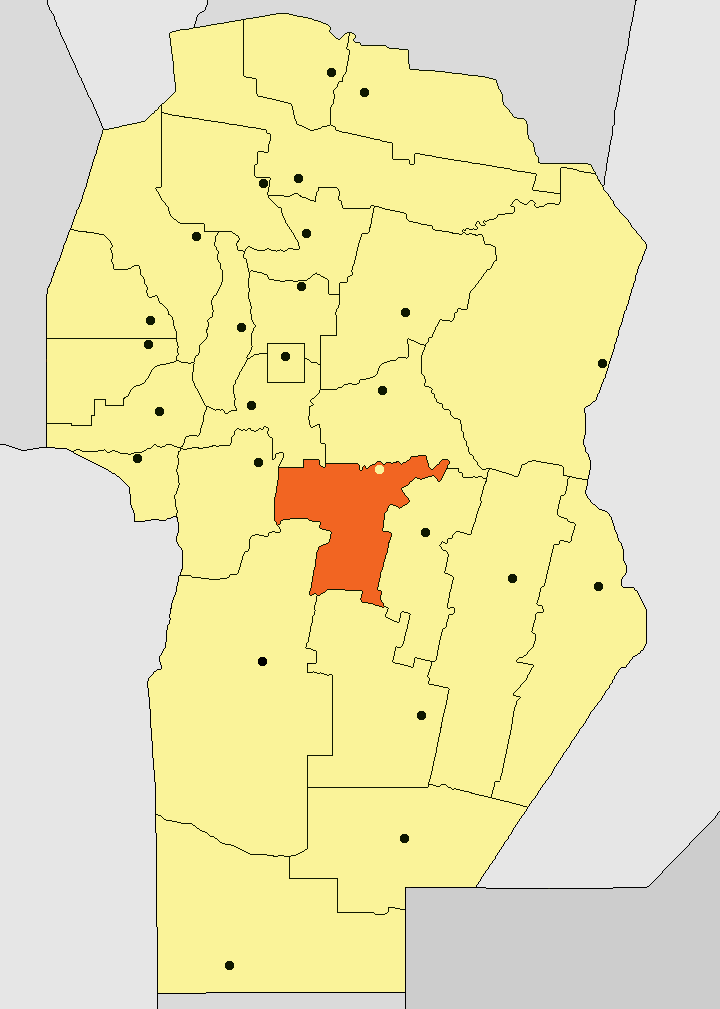
- Location of Tercero Arriba Department in Córdoba Province
- Coordinates: 32°02′S 63°34′W
- Country: Argentina
- Province: Córdoba
- Capital: Oliva

Area
  - Total: 5,187 km^{2} (2,003 sq mi)

Population (2001 census [INDEC])
  - Total: 107,460
  - Density: 20.72/km^{2} (53.66/sq mi)
  - Pop. change (1991-2001): +3.61%
- Time zone: UTC-3 (ART)
- Postal code: X5980
- Dialing code: 03532
- Distances to
- Buenos Aires: 620 km (390 mi)
- Córdoba: 150 km (93 mi)

Tercero Arriba Department is a department of Córdoba Province in Argentina.

The provincial subdivision has a population of about 107,460 inhabitants in an area of 5,187 km^{2}, and its capital city is Oliva, which is located around 620 km from Buenos Aires.

== Settlements ==
- Almafuerte
- Colonia Almada
- Corralito
- Dalmacio Vélez Sarsfield
- General Fotheringham
- Hernando
- James Craik
- Las Isletillas
- Las Perdices
- Los Zorros
- Oliva
- Pampayasta Norte
- Pampayasta Sud
- Punta del Agua
- Río Tercero
- Tancacha
- Villa Ascasubi
