= General Cabrera =

- City
- Location of General Cabrera in Argentina
- Coordinates: 32°47′58″S 63°52′6″W
- Country: Argentina
- Province: Córdoba
- Department: Juárez Celman
- Foundation: 30 June 1893

Government
  - Intendant: Guillermo Cavigliasso (UCR)
- Elevation: 291 m (955 ft)

Population (2010)
  - Total: 11,734
- Time zone: UTC−3 (ART)

General Cabrera is a city located in the Juárez Celman Department in the Province of Córdoba in central Argentina.
