= General Deheza =

- City
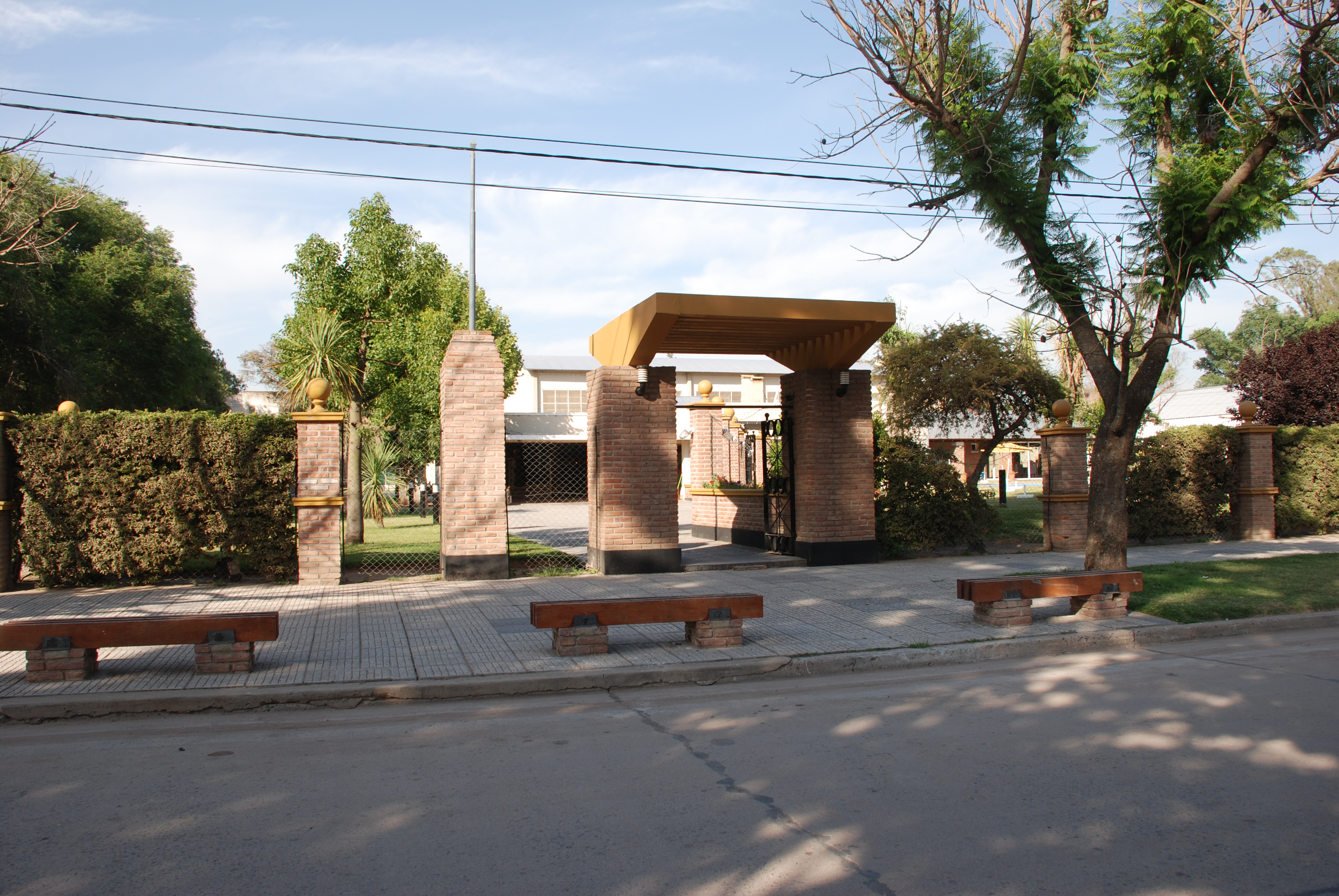

- Location of General Deheza in Argentina
- Coordinates: 32°45′23″S 63°47′20″W
- Country: Argentina
- Province: Córdoba
- Department: Juárez Celman
- Foundation: 1893

Government
  - Intendant: Eduardo Pizzi
- Elevation: 259 m (850 ft)

Population (2010)
  - Total: 11,061
- Time zone: UTC−3 (ART)

General Deheza is a city located in the Juárez Celman Department in the Province of Córdoba in central Argentina.
