= Andrés Waissman =

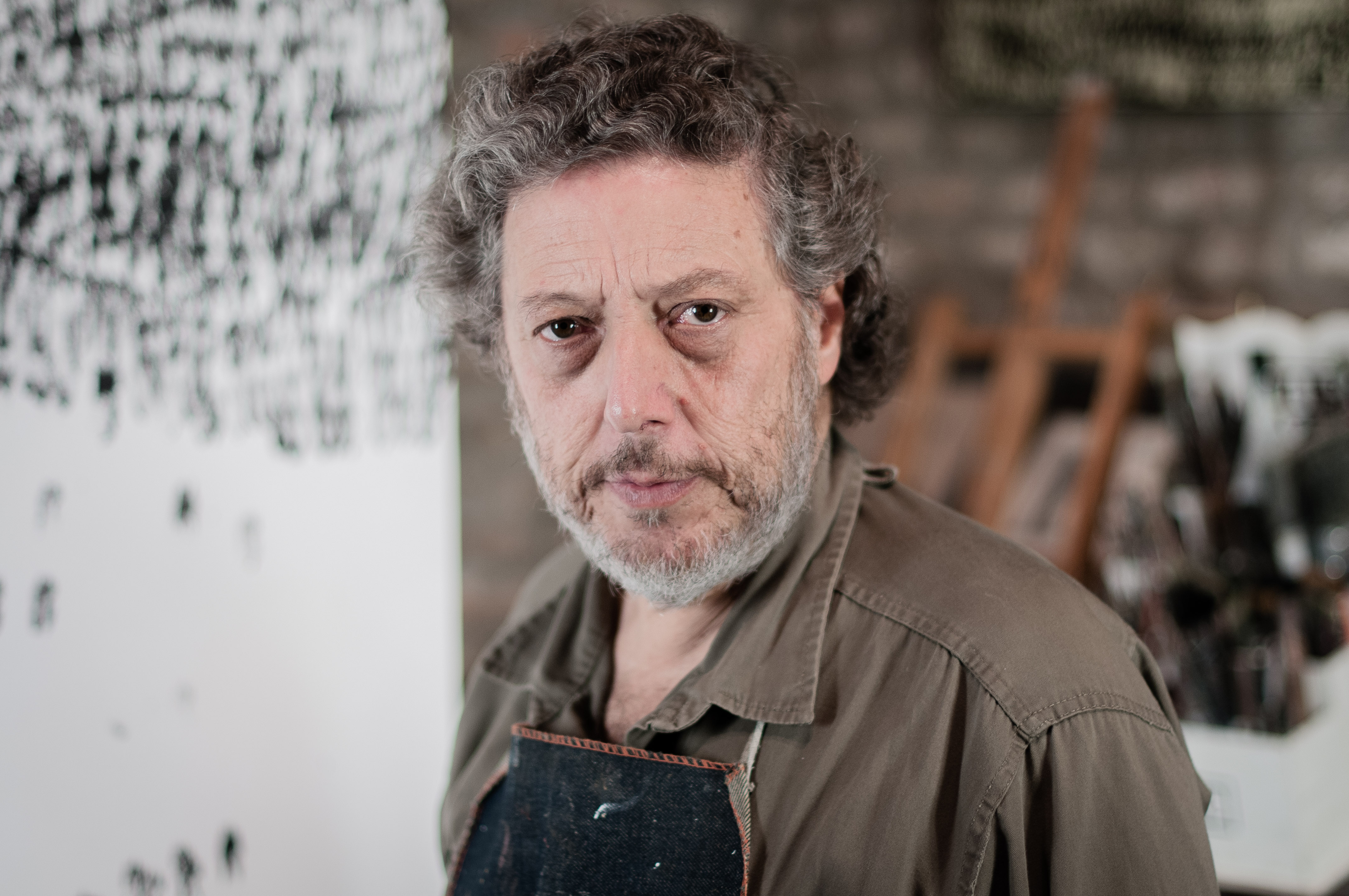
- Waissman at his studio, 2010
- Born: 14 July 1955 (age 69); Buenos Aires, Argentina
- Known for: Painting; Documentary Waissman

Andrés Waissman is a visual artist born in Buenos Aires, Argentina, in 1955. A relevant figure of Argentinian and Latin-American contemporary art, he is known for paintings such as Multitudes, Black & White, and his most recent work, Virutas. He lives and works in Buenos Aires.

== Life ==
Waissman was born in Buenos Aires on 14 July 1955. The third and last son of Carlos Luis Waissman and Regina Tchira, he had a close relationship with the art world since he was a child. Trained in independent workshops, he began exhibiting quite early in the mid 1970s, having his first solo shows at 'Lirolay Gallery' in 1973 and 1977, respectively. At the same time, he hosted AM and FM radio programs, interviewing critics, intellectuals and artists of various artistic expressions. In 1974 he worked in the studio of Augusto Torres in Barcelona, and in 1978 in Paris with Antonio Seguí. In 1984 he moved to San Francisco, where he worked at the Argentinian Consulate as the cultural attaché. It was while he was at the consulate that his career developed internationally, exhibiting in galleries and museums in Los Angeles, San Francisco, New York, and cities throughout Europe.

In 1992 he returned to Buenos Aires, where he began teaching. For three and a half years he and Marina Pellegrini co-hosted Styles, a television program dedicated to rescuing cultural values, especially in the visual arts. In 1995 he opened "Dock del Plata Espacio de Arte", the first showroom in Puerto Madero. It became one of the most prestigious studios in the city until its closure in 1998. After the closure of the studio, Andrés Waissman began to work as a curator and communicator, advising many national public officers and agencies in projects and cultural management strategies.

In 2005 the book Waissman/a pilgrim artist was published. In November 2010 the documentary Waissman, by Eduardo Montes Bradley, premiered on WPBT Channel 2 (PBS) in the United States, as well as being shown at the Museo de Arte Latinoamericano de Buenos Aires (MALBA).

Since 2012 Waissman, along with Rodrigo Alonso, Carlos Herrera, Gabriel Valansi and Eduardo Stupía, has been one of the head teachers for "Proyecto PAC: Prácticas Artísticas Contemporáneas", an annual meeting with a program of art analysis, critique and production. He continues working on his art and developing new art related projects in his studio in Palermo, Buenos Aires, where he also leads a Studio Cri Program and workshops.

== Exhibitions ==
He has had several solo exhibitions and more than sixty collective exhibits in both Argentina and international cities. His work is part of private collections and museums in England, Belgium, Italy, Israel, the United States, Venezuela, Argentina, and Chile, among others. He has also participated in international fairs such as: the Pinta in London; the Lisbon Art Fair; the Miami International Art Fair; the Chicago Contemporary & Classic Art Fair; Ch.ACO in Santiago de Chile; the Miart Fiera Internazionale d'Arte Moderna e Contemporanea Milano; and the arteBA in Buenos Aires.
