= Andrés Rivera =

Argentine writer (1928–2016)

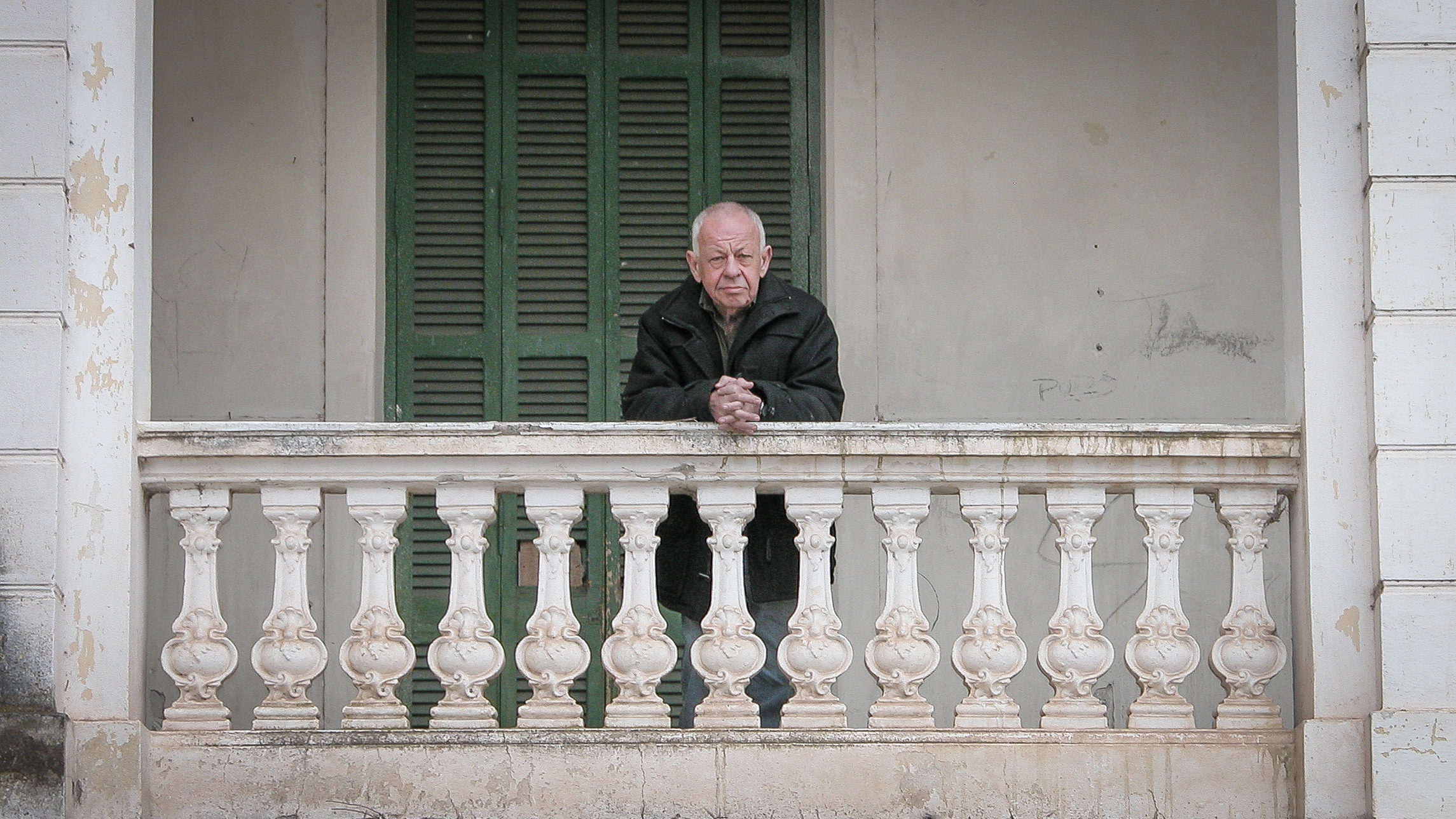
- Occupation: Writer
- Spouse: Susana Fiorito

Andrés Rivera (December 12, 1928 – December 23, 2016), born Marcos Ribak, was an Argentine writer. Born in Buenos Aires, he was at various points a textile worker, a journalist, and a writer. From 1953–1957, Rivera worked as a journalist on the staff of the magazine Plática.

== Awards ==
In 1985 Rivera was awarded the Segundo Premio Municipal de Novela for En esta dulce tierra (On this Sweet Land). In 1992 he won the Premio Nacional de Literatura for his novel La revolución es un sueño eterno (The Revolution is an Eternal Dream). La sierva (The Servant) received recognition as the best book of 1992 by the foundation El Libro. Rivera's novel El farmer (The Farmer), about the final years of Juan Manuel de Rosas, was one of the best-selling books in Argentina during 1996. In 2004, he received a Konex Merit Diploma for literature.

== Personal life ==
He lived in Córdoba with his wife Susana Fiorito. He died there on 23 December 2016 at the age of 88.

== Works ==
- El precio (1957).
- Los que no mueren (1959).
- Sol de sábado (1962).
- Cita (1965).
- Ajuste de cuentas (1972).
- Nada que perder (1982).
- Una lectura de la historia (1982).
- En esta dulce tierra (1984).
- La revolución es un sueño eterno (1987).
- Los vencedores no dudan (1989).
- El amigo de Baudelaire (1991).
- La sierva (1992).
- Mitteleuropa (1993).
- El verdugo en el umbral (1994).
- El farmer (1996).
- La lenta velocidad del coraje (1998).
- El profundo sur (1999).
- Tierra de exilio (2000).
- Hay que matar (2001).
- El manco Paz (2003).
- Cría de asesinos (2004).
- Esto por ahora (2005).

== Filmography ==
- Marcos Ribak aka Andrés Rivera. Contrakultura Films, 2005. Directed by Eduardo Montes-Bradley
