= Oliva, Argentina =

Oliva
- Town
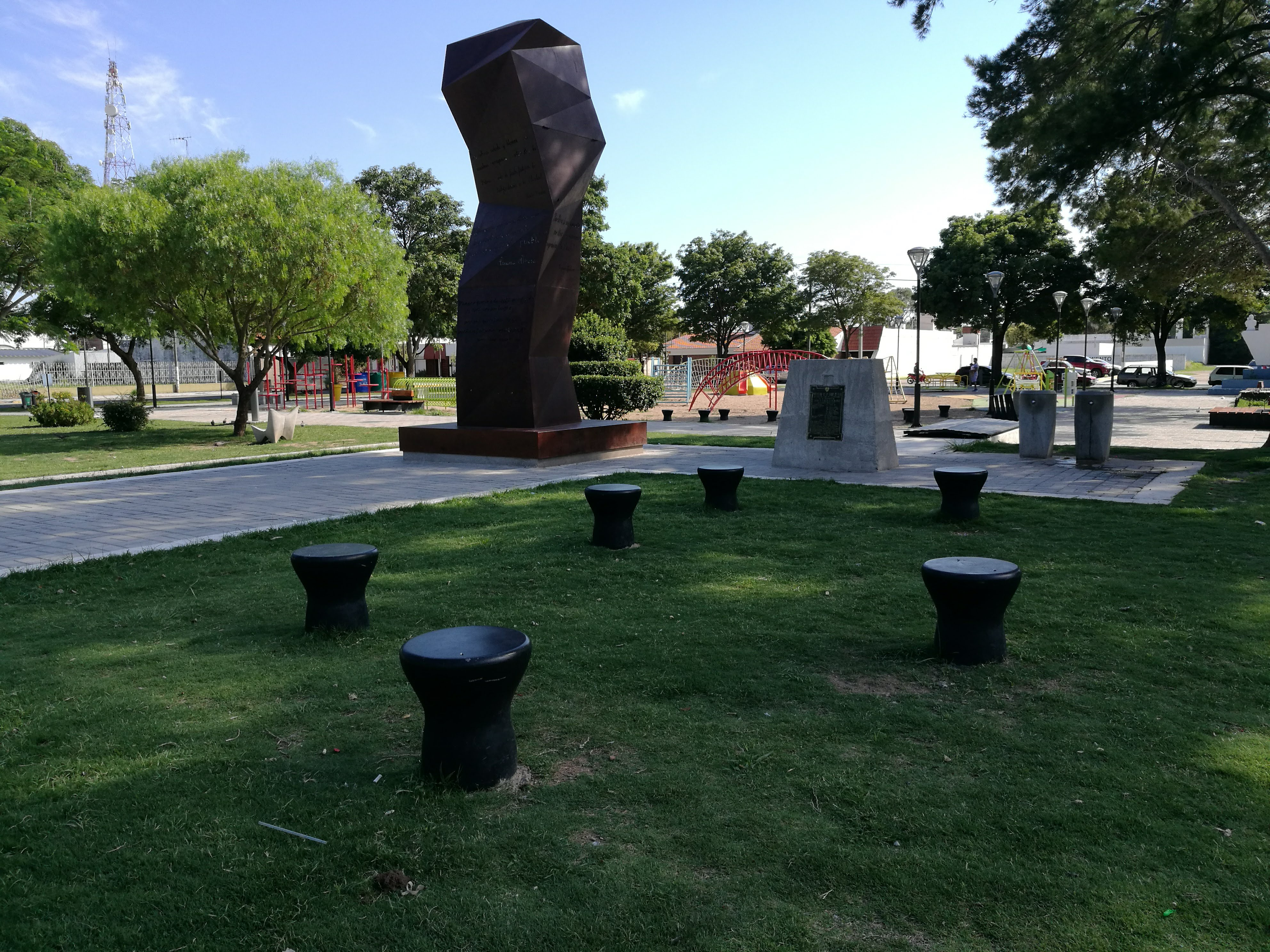
- Plaza in Oliva

- Location of Oliva in Argentina
- Coordinates: 32°02′S 63°34′W
- Country: Argentina
- Province: Córdoba
- Department: Tercero Arriba

Government
  - Intendant: José Octavio Ibarra (UCR)
- Elevation: 248 m (814 ft)

Population
  - Total: 9,629
- Demonym: Olivense
- Time zone: UTC−3 (ART)
- CPA base: X5980
- Dialing code: +54 3532

Oliva is a town in Córdoba Province in Argentina. It is the chief town of the Tercero Arriba Department.
