= Dalmacio Vélez Sarsfield, Argentina =

Dalmacio Vélez Sarsfield
- Locality
- Location of Dalmacio Vélez Sarsfield in Argentina
- Coordinates: 32°36′36″S 63°34′37″W
- Country: Argentina
- Province: Córdoba
- Department: Tercero Arriba

Government
  - Intendant: Rubén Sargiotto (Juntos por el Cambio)
- Elevation: 249 m (817 ft)

Population (2010)
  - Total: 1,497
- Time zone: UTC−3 (ART)

Dalmacio Vélez Sarsfield is a locality located in the Tercero Arriba Department in the province of Córdoba in central Argentina.
