= Isaac Aisemberg =

Argentine Dramatist

- Born: 22 January 1918; General Pico, La Pampa Province, Argentina
- Died: 26 December 1997 (aged 79); Buenos Aires, Argentina,
- Education: University of Buenos Aires, National University of La Plata
- Occupations: Writer, screenwriter, playwright
- Years active: 1960–1997
- Children: Gabriela Aisemberg
- Parent(s): Jacobo Aisemberg and Bertha Saslavsky

Isaac Aisemberg (22 January 1918 – 26 December 1997) was an Argentine writer, screenwriter and dramatist. Among his most outstanding contributions is his collaboration in the adaptation for the film Hombre de la esquina rosada of Jorge Luis Borges and his novel Cuestion de dados.

== Biography ==
Aisemberg was born in General Pico (province of La Pampa), had his primary and secondary studies between Córdoba and Buenos Aires and went through the universities of Buenos Aires and La Plata. He was an advisor to the Ministry of Culture of the Nation, a jury in film festivals, a contributor to the International Film Festival of Mar del Plata, a member of the screenwriting tribunal at the Cinematography Institute, a professor in journalism schools, and was in charge of the Circle of the Press and was president of Argentores (General Society of Authors of Argentina).

He wrote numerous stories, novels and plays, among them Es más tarde de lo que crees, No hay rosas en la tumba del marino, No hay ojos aquí and La guerra del cuarto mundo. Some of his works were translated for North American editions and his novel Cuestion de dados, as well as his volume of stories Jaque mate in two plays, appear in important international anthologies. He was awarded as the Prize of Honor of Argentores.

Among other scripts he wrote the films El bote, el río y la gente, La Rabona and Bajo el signo de la patria. When he was writing this last script – in 1971, during the dictatorship of Lanusse -, a general named González Filgueira – president of the Belgraniano Institute – told him that from the SIDE (State Intelligence Service) he had objected to a Jew writing on the motherland and the flag, for which Aisemberg chose to sign it under the name of Ismael Montaña. The critic Fernando Peña has said about that film that "it can humiliate almost all the examples that the genre produced at that time." Rhetoric is avoided with laconic texts that manage to gambol on marble, while the image maintains a clear and dusty tone. Among the unspecified projects is a version of Una excursión a los indios ranqueles (who worked with Mario Soffici) and an adaptation of the story La intrusa by Jorge Luis Borges (performed with René Mugica). His collaboration with René Mugica (which Aisemberg considered very pleasant) were also two libretti presented in the contest of the Institute of Cinematography in 1979, El señor Brown y El despoblado, one won first prize and the other a mention.

Between 1995 and 1996, he was the president of Argentores, an Argentine entity that brings together the authors, to which Aisemberg belonged for many years.

He died on 26 December 1997 while he was acting as director of the Center for Experimentation and Cinematographic Production (CERC), the film school of the National Institute of Cinematography.

== Conversion to Roman Catholicism ==
Twenty years after the premiere of Bajo el signo de la patria, Aisemberg converted to Catholicism. He was converted by his friend, priest Leonardo Castellani, an author of detective fiction and his conversion had Gilbert K. Chesterton's and Graham Greene's books influence.

== Filmography ==
- El bote, el río y la gente (1960) directed by Enrique Cahen Salaberry.
- Libertad bajo palabra (1961) directed by Alfredo Bettanín.
- Rebelde con causa (1961) directed by Antonio Cunill.
- Hombre de la esquina rosada (1962) directed by René Mugica.
- Rata de puerto (1963) directed by René Mugica.
- Mujeres perdidas (1964) directed by Rubén W. Cavallotti.
- Bajo el signo de la patria (1971) directed by René Mugica.
- Las Píldoras (1972) directed by Enrique Cahen Salaberry.
- La Piel del amor (1973) directed by Mario David.
- Yo maté a Facundo (1975) directed by Hugo del Carril.
- La Rabona (1979) directed by Mario David.
- Adiós, abuelo (1996) directed by Emilio Vieyra.

== Sources ==
- http://www.lanacion.com.ar/84193-fallecio-el-escritor-isaac-aisenberg, La Nación de Buenos Aires of 28 December 1997. Retrieved on 20 June 2008.
- Manrupe, Raúl; Portela, María Alejandra (2001). A dictionary of Argentine films (1930–1995). Buenos Aires: Corregidor. ISBN 950-05-0896-6.
