= Soriano (film) =

- Directed by: Eduardo Montes-Bradley
- Produced by: Contrakultura Films
- Starring: Ana María Shua, Gianni Minà, Franco Lucentini, Gianni Minà and others
- Cinematography: Gastón Ocampo
- Edited by: Eduardo López
- Distributed by: Alexander Street Press
- Release date: April 22, 1999 (Argentina)
- Running time: 80 minutes, and 60 minutes
- Country: Argentina
- Languages: Spanish, French, Italian

Soriano is a biographical documentary exploring the life and works of Osvaldo Soriano, author of Funny Dirty Little War, through testimonies of friends and colleagues in Argentina, France, Belgium, Germany, and Italy. The documentary includes rare 16mm footage filmed by Soriano and friends in his hometown of Tandil in the early 1960s. Part of this original footage was used by the director to reconstruct a short film as it was scripted by a young Osvaldo Soriano. The short film is now in the permanent collection of several university libraries.

Soriano was filmed on locations in Milan, Rome, Paris, Linz am Rhein, Brussels, and Buenos Aires, and includes interviews with Osvaldo Bayer, Héctor Olivera, Gianni Minà, Franco Lucentini, Federico Luppi, Eduardo Galeano, Fernando Birri and others.

The film was produced with the support of the Secretaría de Cultura de la Nación, the Fondo Nacional de las Artes, the Fondo Nacional de Cine y Artes Audiovisuales, and the Ministerio de Relaciones Exteriores of Argentina.

Soriano theatrical release was followed by the publication of a collection of testimonies in the essay "Soriano: Un Retrato" containing the entire original interviews, including the fragments that did not make it to the final cut. Soriano was later published on DVD by Noticias.

== Production ==
Soriano was the fourth feature film and first documentary by director Eduardo Montes-Bradley, who was born in Córdoba in 1960 and had lived in the United States from 1978 to 1995. His previous films — Smooth Talker, Double Obsession, and El Sekuestro — were fiction features produced in the United States.

Montes-Bradley began filming in 1997, shortly after returning to Argentina following Soriano's death on January 29 of that year. "Cuando volví al país, en 1997, quería reconciliarme con Buenos Aires, con todo lo que me había perdido desde 1978, cuando me tuve que ir. Y Soriano era la figura emblemática de los '80s," the director said. Interviews were conducted across multiple countries, including Italy, France, Belgium, and Argentina. Filming in Rome with Fernando Birri took place in September 1997.

The documentary incorporates animation sequences created by Liliana Romero and Vicky Biagiola, as well as the reconstructed 1962 short film Un joven de nuestro tiempo, made by Soriano and a friend in Tandil.

== Interviewees ==
The film features testimonies from more than twenty-five individuals who knew Soriano personally or professionally. Among those interviewed are:

- Osvaldo Bayer, Argentine journalist and historian
- Héctor Olivera, Argentine filmmaker who directed screen adaptations of Soriano's novels
- Fernando Birri, Argentine filmmaker
- Federico Luppi, Argentine actor
- Eduardo Galeano, Uruguayan writer
- Ariel Dorfman, Chilean-American writer
- Martín Caparrós, Argentine writer and journalist
- Juan Forn, Argentine novelist and editor
- Rodrigo Fresán, Argentine novelist
- Ana María Shua, Argentine writer
- Liliana Hecker, Argentine writer
- José Pablo Feinmann, Argentine philosopher and writer
- Dalmiro Sáenz, Argentine writer
- Antonio Dal Masetto, Argentine writer
- Roberto Cossa, Argentine playwright
- Santo Biasatti, Argentine journalist
- Aída Bortnik, Argentine screenwriter
- Gianni Minà, Italian journalist and television host
- Nico Orengo, Italian writer and editor
- Maurizio Matteuzi, Italian film critic
- Franco Lucentini, Italian writer and translator

== Screenings and release ==
Prior to its commercial premiere, Soriano was screened at several events. In May 1998, a pre-premiere was held at the Buenos Aires International Book Fair, where approximately five hundred people attended. Further screenings took place in Rosario (June 1998) and at the Sala Miguel Cané in Buenos Aires (August 1998), the latter with institutional support from the Secretaría de Cultura de la Nación.

The film had its commercial theatrical premiere on April 22, 1999, at the Cine El Cosmos in Buenos Aires. The Argentine theatrical distributor was Contrakultura Films. The film is currently distributed by Heritage Film Project and was previously made available through Alexander Street Press.

== Awards and honors ==
- Official Selection, XIII Festival del Cinema Latino Americano. Trieste, October 1998

== Critical reception ==
Soriano received broad coverage across the Argentine press upon its theatrical release in April 1999.

Writing in Clarín, critic Juan Sasturain praised the film as "literalmente un documental, no otra cosa," noting that it successfully assembled a wide range of voices from across the literary and political spectrum without imposing a fixed interpretation on its subject. In the same edition of Clarín, Jorge Carnevale called the film "un revelador filme" and headlined his review El narrador interminable ("The Endless Narrator"), noting that novelist Martín Caparrós described Soriano's work as "un bien producido pop" — a well-produced popular commodity — that arrived at the literary academy through the market before being recognized as literature.

La Nación called the film "un audaz retrato" and praised Montes-Bradley's ability to build intimacy with his subjects across twenty-six interviews. La Prensa awarded the film three stars and described it as "un documental interesante sobre la figura de un gran escritor contemporáneo." Ámbito Financiero called it a "buena semblanza" of the writer.

El Cronista published an interview with the director alongside Alberto Farina's review, which described the film as "especialmente atractivo para lectores de la obra de Soriano." The magazine Trespuntos wrote that Montes-Bradley achieved "una película correcta y ligeramente perversa, que sugiere más de lo que enuncia y oculta más de lo que muestra pero mantiene el interés por el personaje y su entorno."

In Italy, La Stampa of Turin covered the production as early as 1997, with journalist Nico Orengo — who also appears in the film — writing about Montes-Bradley's journey across Europe to interview Soriano's circle of friends and colleagues.
