= José Frade =

- Born: 1938 (age 87–88); Madrid
- Known for: Film production and scriptwriting

José Frade (born in Madrid in 1938) is a Spanish film producer, businessman and film and television distributor. He owns his production company, José Frade Producciones Cinematográficas.

== Professional career ==
His career started as a businessman working for theatre companies in the late 1950s, with his first production being Irma la Douce, which became a success in Barcelona and the rest of Spain despite the initial failure in Madrid.

In 1996, he founded Canal 7 Televisión, whose coverage was limited to the Community of Madrid, where he hired notable television staff to lure viewers to the new channel. By 2002, it had become the most successful local television station in Spain and the one with the highest number of potential viewers, though, by January 2014, the station closed down.

=== Commercial success ===
By becoming one of the main Spanish film producers in the 1960s, the first part of his career was centered on the production of spaghetti westerns until, in 1970, he produced a comedy which became an unprecedented success, No desearás al vecino del quinto, directed by Tito Fernández and with Alfredo Landa as its lead actor. Over four million people watched it in its original theatrical run. This gave way to a subgenre known as landismo, which continued with No desearás la mujer del vecino (1971), Préstame quince días (1971), Los días de Cabirio (1971), Cuando el cuerno suena (1975), etc.

In parallel, he makes other genres (suspense, musical, destape), with consolidated directors (José Luis Sáenz de Heredia, José Antonio Nieves Conde, Luis Lucia) as well as new ones (Eloy de la Iglesia). With La chica del Molino Rojo, directed by Eugenio Martín in 1973, the image Marisol had as a prodigy child gave way to an adult, sophisticated Pepa Flores. He also produced several movies that helped leap Manolo Escobar to stardom.

=== Democratic transition ===
With the arrival of the Spanish transition to democracy, his career evolves towards films with historical and social content, presented and awarded in international festivals, among the first, Torment and Pim, pam, pum... ¡fuego! (Pedro Olea, 1974 and 1975) and, later, titles that represented the opening of society, such as La trastienda (Jorge Grau, 1975), Las largas vacaciones del 36 (Jaime Camino, 1976), La guerra de papá (Antonio Mercero, 1977) or Un hombre llamado Flor de Otoño (Pedro Olea, 1978).

In 1977 he was elected Presidente de la Asociación Independiente de Productores Cinematográficos Españoles (AECINE), becoming the first to be democratically elected outside of the vertical union.

He did not abandon commercial cinema: with Mariano Ozores, he directed Préstame tu mujer (1980), Brujas mágicas (1981), Cristóbal Colón, de oficio... descubridor (1982), Juana la loca... de vez en cuando (1983), etc. and in 1989, he produces Blood and Sand, directed by Javier Elorrieta with US actress Sharon Stone in the leading role.

=== Television ===
In 1983, he extends his production line to television, making the series Las pícaras, but criticized the subvention policy for Spanish cinema and its connections to Televisión Española during Pilar Miró's mandate and Felipe González's successive governments.

In the 1990s, he became a shareholder at Antena 3 Televisión owning 5% of the network. As of 1997, he was critical of Antonio Asensio's management. He produces Canguros (1994), Hermanos de leche (1994), Tres hijos para mí solo (1995) y Yo, una mujer (1996). He returned to collaborate with TVE with Café con leche (1998), Academia de baile Gloria (2001) and ¿Se puede? (2004).

Finally, in 1996, he launches his own television station, Canal 7 Televisión, where he produced El precio justo (Spanish version of The Price is Right, formerly on TVE), El rastro, Ayuda en marcha, 7 de corazones, Corazón del milenio and El debate, among others. He also launched music shows such as Las chicas y los chicos, Dedicado a ti, Salto a la fama, La copla, Historias del cuplé.

In 1998, he became one of the key funders of La Razón, founded by Luis María Anson, although he quickly left the project. That year, the courts resolved a quarrel against him facing those responsible for the Telecinco series Médico de familia for a supposed crime against intellectual property.

In 2010, he produced Don Mendo Rock. ¿La venganza?, directed by José Luis García Sánchez.

In 2014, his film Por un puñado de besos was released, and in 2016, he returned to television with the TVE series La sonata del silencio.

New platforms cause Frade's production company, now led by his son Constantino, to develop titles that have caused interest from several platforms. La Reconquista, based on José Javier Esparza's book, and several original scripts, became a part of José Frade PC's project catalog in pre-production phase. As of November 2025, the project is still in development hell and is pending an official funding decision from RTVE.
