= Man on Pink Corner =

Short story by Jorge Luis Borges

"Man on Pink Corner" (original Spanish title: "Hombre de la Esquina Rosada") is a short story by Argentine writer and poet Jorge Luis Borges. It is the first of several stories he wrote concerning duels between knife-fighters, which Borges recognized as one of his archetypal themes. "The story is one I have been retelling, with small variations, ever since. It is the tale of the motiveless, or disinterested, duel—of courage for its own sake."

== History of publication ==
A version of the story was first published on February 26, 1927 under the name "Police legend" (original Spanish title: "Leyenda Policial") in the literary magazine Martín Fierro, and then in 1928 in El idioma de los argentinos as "Men Fought" (original Spanish title: "Hombres Pelearon"). Under the pseudonym Francisco Buscos, Borges published a third version, "Men of the Neighborhoods" (original Spanish title: "Hombres de las Orillas"), in Crítica in 1933. A revised version was later published in the 1935 collection A Universal History of Iniquity.

== Plot summary ==
The story is told from the first-person perspective of an unnamed narrator, who recounts the events of a particular night at a Villa Santa Rita bar and brothel. The clientele, including the narrator, spend the evening drinking and dancing the tango. Their festivities are interrupted by the arrival of a formidable stranger in black. When the narrator and some of the other patrons try to fight him, he effortlessly brushes them away.

As he leads his gang into the room, the stranger introduces himself as Francisco Real, also known as "the Yardmaster," a knife fighter from the Northside district of Buenos Aires. He announces to the group that he has come to challenge the local tough, "the Sticker" Rosendo Juárez, who at the time commanded the respect and admiration of the entire neighborhood. Juárez ignores the challenge despite the urgings of his girlfriend, the local beauty, La Lujanera. To her disgust, Juárez flings his knife out the window and slips out into the street. La Lujanera decries his cowardice and, wrapping her arms around the Yardmaster, chooses to dance with him, instead. Eventually the two of them step outside, arm in arm; the Yardmaster implies that they will sleep together. The narrator, overwhelmed with feelings of shame and dishonor, follows them outside. He reflects on his sense of insignificance, on Rosendo's (and his) impotence in the face of a "bully" like the Yardmaster.

At some point the narrator returns to the brothel. La Lujanera returns shortly thereafter, followed by the Yardmaster, who is dying from a knife wound to the chest. La Lujanera tearfully explains to the patrons that after the two of them left, a stranger – not Rosendo – appeared, challenged the Yardmaster to a fight, and stabbed him in the dark. The Yardmaster dies on the floor of the brothel. When a patron accuses La Lujanera of murdering him, the narrator comes to her defense and mocks the group by pointing out the irony of a man as fierce as the Yardmaster dying in a backwater neighborhood where nothing ever happens.

The patrons hear the police approaching, and wanting to avoid the law, they loot the Yardmaster's body and dispose of it in the river. Dawn breaks, La Lujanera takes her leave, and the brothel returns to normal. The narrator concludes by describing to his audience – revealed to be Borges himself – how he returned to his house. As the narrator strolls down the street inspecting his dagger, he looks up to see a light burning in the window of his house. It is implied that the narrator is the one who killed the Yardmaster, and that La Lujanera is in his home, waiting for him.

== Connections to Borges' other works ==
In 1970, Borges published a prequel to "The Man on Pink Corner," called "The Story from Rosendo Juárez," which retells the night's events from Juárez's perspective.

== Adaptations ==
"Man on Pink Corner" was adapted into a 1962 film of the same title by Argentine director René Múgica. It was shown at the Cannes and San Sebastián film festivals, and was favorably received by Borges, who commented that the director "did a good job with the possibilities provided by the plot."
