= Juan José Mosalini =

Argentine bandoneon player (1943–2022)

- Born: 29 November 1943; José_C._Paz,_Buenos_Aires, Argentina
- Died: 27 May 2022 (aged 78)
- Genres: Argentine Tango
- Occupation: Musician
- Instrument: Bandoneon
- Years active: 1961–2022

Juan José Mosalini (29 November 1943 – 27 May 2022) was an Argentine bandoneon player. He specialized in tango nuevo and resided in France.

== Biography ==
=== Background ===
Juan José was born into a family of artisans who were passionate about music. His father and grandfather, who both played the bandoneon, brought him to Argentina's musical traditions. Eight years old, he started himself to learn this instrument. Mosalini was a largely self-taught musician who learned a lot of music on the street. At the age of 13, he had already started playing in ballrooms as a member of an orchestra consisting of four bandoneons, four violins, one piano, one bass and two singers.

=== Career ===
In 1961 he won first prize in a contest organized by the Argentine television. 17 years old, he became a professional musician. While most of the young people of the time were more interested in rock music, he devoted his entire life to traditional music. Until 1976 he lived in Argentina where he played with some of the most famous orchestras and soloists. He composed, arranged, interpreted, accompanied and produced recordings with, among others, José Basso, Leopoldo Federico, Astor Piazzolla, Osvaldo Pugliese, Susana Rinaldi, Edmundo Rivero and Horacio Salgán. There, he formed his first ensemble, Guardia Nueva quintet with the bandoneonist Daniel Binelli and had a profound impact on avant-garde tango .

In 1977 he moved to France. Along with other Argentine musicians he formed the band Tiempo Argentino and recorded an album titled Tango Rojo with a pianist Gustavo Beytelmann, flautist Enzo Gieco and guitarist Thomas Gubitsch. Later he formed the quartet Canyengues (with Gustavo Beytelmann and Patrice Caratini) and released numerous recordings, including a solo bandeneon album that received some critical success..

In 1987 Moselini work with Italian singer-songwriter Francesco Guccini, playing bandoneon in album Signora Bovary.

Mosalini worked to disseminate knowledge and taught bandoneon in France and in 1999 founded the first bandoneon course in Europe at the Conservatory of Music in Gennevilliers. As a composer, he has also written film scores including Serge Leroy's Double Face and Le 4ème Pouvoir and Peter Lilienthal's Das Autogramm.

== Discography ==
- Don Bandoneón (LP, Album) (Hexagone 1979)
- La Bordona (LP, Album) by Juan Jose Mosalini, Gustavo Beytelmann, Patrice Caratini (Productions Patrice Caratini 1982)
- Inspiracion Del Tango (LP) by Mosalini, Beytelmann, Caratini (Eigelstein Musikproduktion 1983)
- Buenas Noches Che Bandoneon (LP, Album) (Eigelstein Musikproduktion Teldec 1983)
- World Music Meeting (LP, Album + 7") by Hozan Yamamoto, Charlie Mariano. Juan José Mosalini, Krzesimir Debski, Alfred Harth, Karl Berger, Peter Kowald, Ken Johnson. Ponda O'Bryan, Trilok Gurtu, Barry Altshul (Eigelstein Musikproduktion 1985)
- Imagenes (LP, Album) by Mosalini, Beytelmann, Caratini (Eigelstein Musikproduktion 1987)
- Violento (CD, Album) by Mosalini, Beytelmann, Caratini (Harmonia Mundi – Label Bleu 1990)
- Ché Bandoneon (CD) Label Bleu 1992)
- Tango La Elegia De Quienes Ya No Estan (CD) (Telarc) by Rudolf Werthen, I Fiamminghi, Juán José Mosalini 1999
- Conciertos Para Bandoneon Y Guitarra (CD) by Juán José Mosalini, Leonardo Sanchez, L'Ensemble de Basse-Normandie, Dominique Debart (Label Bleu 1990)
- Clásico Y Moderno (CD, Album, Spe) by Mosalini og Quatuor Benaïm (Mañana 2005)
- Piazzolla Vol. 2 (Sinfonía Buenos Aires / Mar Del Plata 70 / Cuatro Estaciones Porteñas / Concerto For Bandoneón, String Orchestra And Percussion) (CD) by Astor Piazzolla, Juán José Mosalini, Württembergische Philharmonie Reutlingen, Gabriel Castagna (Chandos 2007)
