= A House Without Boundaries =

1972 film

- Spanish: La casa sin fronteras
- Directed by: Pedro Olea
- Written by: Pedro Olea; José Agustín; Juan Antonio Porto
- Starring: Geraldine Chaplin
- Cinematography: Luis Cuadrado
- Edited by: José Antonio Rojo
- Music by: Carmelo Bernaola
- Production company: Amboto Producciones Cinematográficas
- Release date: 13 April 1972
- Running time: 92 minutes
- Country: Spain
- Language: Spanish

A House Without Boundaries (Spanish: La casa sin fronteras) is a 1972 Spanish drama film set in Bilbao and directed by Pedro Olea. It was entered into the 22nd Berlin International Film Festival.

== Cast ==
- María Arias
- Charly Bravo
- Geraldine Chaplin
- Luis Ciges
- Jesús Fernández
- José Franco
- Tony Isbert
- William Layton
- Viveca Lindfors
- José Orjas
- Julio Peña
- Luis Peña
- Eusebio Poncela
- Margarita Robles
- Patty Shepard
