= Akelarre (film) =

1984 film

- Theatrical release poster
- Directed by: Pedro Olea
- Written by: Gonzalo Goicoechea; Pedro Olea
- Starring: Sílvia Munt; José Luis López Vázquez; Mari Carrillo; Walter Vidarte; Patxi Bisquert; Iñaki Miramón
- Cinematography: José Luis Alcaine
- Edited by: José Salcedo
- Music by: Carmelo Bernaola
- Release dates: February 1984 (Berlinale); 8 March 1984 (Spain)
- Running time: 109 minutes
- Country: Spain
- Language: Spanish

Akelarre (Note: Akelarre means "Witches' Sabbath" in Basque.) is a 1984 Spanish period drama film directed by Pedro Olea. The plot tackles witchcraft trials directed against the Araitz witches.

== Plot ==
Set in Navarre at the end of the 16th century. Garazi is the granddaughter of a woman burned as a witch who confronts the Catholic Church again, but is ultimately freed by Unai Esparza and his men.

== Cast ==
- Sílvia Munt as Garazi
- José Luis López Vázquez as Inquisitor
- Mary Carrillo as Amunia
- Walter Vidarte as Don Fermín de Andueza
- Patxi Bisquert as Unai
- Iñaki Miramón as Íñigo
- Mikel Garmendia
- Javier Loyola as Prior
- Sergio Mendizábal as Antxón
- Félix Rotaeta as J. de Areso

== Release ==
The film was entered into the 34th Berlin International Film Festival. It was released theatrically in Spain on 8 March 1984.

== See also ==
- List of Spanish films of 1984
