= Torment (1974 film) =

- Theatrical release poster
- Spanish: Tormento
- Directed by: Pedro Olea
- Screenplay by: Ricardo López Aranda; José Frade; Pedro Olea; Ángel María de Lera
- Based on: Tormento; 1884 novel by Benito Pérez Galdós
- Produced by: José Frade
- Starring: Ana Belén; Francisco Rabal; Conchita Velasco; Javier Escrivá
- Cinematography: Fernando Arribas
- Edited by: José Antonio Rojo
- Music by: Carmelo Bernaola
- Production company: José Frade PC
- Distributed by: Atlántida
- Release date: 2 September 1974
- Country: Spain
- Language: Spanish
- Box office: 120.6 million pesetas

Torment (Spanish: Tormento) is a 1974 Spanish drama film directed by Pedro Olea based on the novel of the same name by Benito Pérez Galdós which stars Ana Belén, Francisco Rabal, Concha Velasco, and Javier Escrivá.

== Plot ==
The plot is set in 19th-century Madrid. Upon the return of enriched Agustín from the Americas to Spain, young maid Amparo, working for the Bringas and in a relationship with priest Pedro Polo, is courted by Agustín.

== Cast ==
- Ana Belén as Amparo
- Conchita Velasco as Rosalía de Bringas
- Francisco Rabal as Agustín Caballero
- Javier Escrivá as Pedro Polo
- Rafael Alonso as Francisco Bringas
- Ismael Merlo as Padre Nones
- María Luisa San José as Refugio
- Amelia de la Torre as Marcelina Polo
- Milagros Leal as Celedonia
- María Isbert as Prudencia

== Production ==
An adaptation of the novel Tormento by Benito Pérez Galdós, the screenplay was written by Ricardo López Aranda, José Frade, Pedro Olea, and Ángel María de Lera. The film is a José Frade PC production.

== Release ==
Distributed by Atlántida, the film was released theatrically in Spain on 2 September 1974. The film became Olea's most successful film and was the highest-grossing Spanish film of the year with a gross of 75 million pesetas. By the end of 1975, it was the seventh highest-grossing Spanish film of all time with a gross of 106 million pesetas from 1.7 million admissions. By 1987, it had over 2 million admissions and a gross of 120.6 million,

The film's critical reception was also positive.

== See also ==
- List of Spanish films of 1974
