= Goodbye Grandad =

Adiós, abuelo
- Film poster
- Directed by: Emilio Vieyra
- Written by: Isaac Aisemberg; Emilio Vieyra
- Produced by: Carlos Celano
- Starring: Stella Maris Lanzani; Jairo; Ricardo Bauleo
- Cinematography: Victor Hugo Caula
- Edited by: Miguel López; Eduardo López
- Music by: Horacio Malviccino
- Release date: 5 September 1996
- Running time: 95 minutes
- Country: Argentina
- Language: Spanish

Goodbye Grandad (Adiós Abuelo) is a 1996 Argentine musical film directed by Emilio Vieyra and written by Isaac Aisemberg. It stars Jairo and Stella Maris Lanzani. It was filmed in Buenos Aires.

== Synopsis ==
In this musical based around tango dancing, an integral part of Argentine culture, a tango singer assumes responsibility for the five-year-old son of an ensemble's musical director after he is forced into exile with his wife for political reasons.

== Cast ==
- Jairo
- Stella Maris Lanzani
- Ricardo Bauleo
- Gabriel Mores
- Iliana Calabró
- Walter Canella
- Ivo Cutzarida
- Alejandra Desiderio
- Gustavo Fabi
- Leandro Ferrara
- Claudio Garófalo
- Jorge Gesdel
- Carlos Girini
- Ignacio Glaria
- Monica Gonzaga
