= 34th Berlin International Film Festival =

1984 film festival in West Berlin, Germany

- Festival poster
- Opening film: The Noah's Ark Principle
- Location: West Berlin, Germany
- Founded: 1951
- Awards: Golden Bear: Love Streams
- No. of films: 315 films
- Festival date: 17–28 February 1984
- Website: http://www.berlinale.de

Berlin International Film Festival chronology
- 35th 33rd

The 34th annual Berlin International Film Festival was held from 17–28 February 1984. The festival opened with The Noah's Ark Principle by Roland Emmerich. The retrospective was dedicated to German-American actor, screenwriter, producer and film director Ernst Lubitsch.

The Golden Bear was awarded to Love Streams directed by John Cassavetes. The Honorary Golden Bear was awarded to American director Jules Dassin and Greek actress Melina Mercouri and the Homage section was dedicated to the couple.

== Juries ==
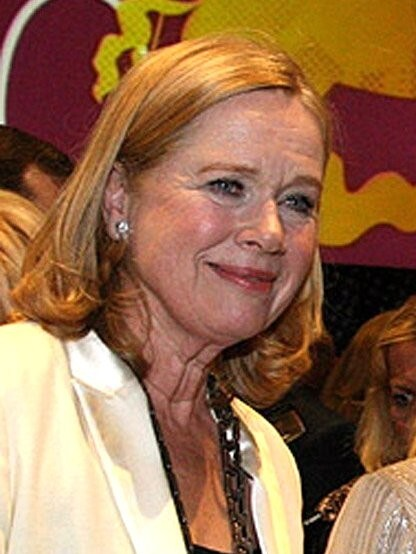
Liv Ullmann, Jury President

The following people were announced as being on the jury for the festival:

=== Main Competition ===
- Liv Ullmann, Norwegian actress - Jury President
- Jules Dassin, American filmmaker and producer
- Edward Bennett, British filmmaker
- Manuela Cernat-Gheorghiu, Romanian film historian
- Lana Gogoberidze, Soviet filmmaker
- Tullio Kezich, Italian film critic, playwright and screenwriter
- Steffen Kuchenreuther, West-German producer and distributor
- Jeanine Meerapfel, West-German filmmaker
- Kevin Thomas, American film critic
- Mario Vargas Llosa, Peruvian writer and playwright
- Adolphe Viezzi, French producer

== Official Sections ==
=== Main Competition ===
The following films were in competition for the Golden Bear:

| English title | Original title | Director(s) | Production Country |
|---|---|---|---|
| Ah Ying | 半邊人 | Allen Fong | Hong Kong |
| Akelarre | | Pedro Olea | Spain |
| À Nos Amours | | Maurice Pialat | France |
| Antarctica | 南極物語 | Koreyoshi Kurahara | Japan |
| Le Bal | | Ettore Scola | France |
| Beauty and the Beast | Skønheden og udyret | Nils Malmros | Denmark |
| Blood Is Always Hot | 血，总是热的 | Yan Wen | China |
| Champions | | John Irvin | United Kingdom |
| Class Relations | Klassenverhältnisse | Jean-Marie Straub, Danièle Huillet | West Germany |
| Crackers | | Louis Malle | United States |
| Das Autogramm | | Peter Lilienthal | West Germany |
| De stille Oceaan | | Digna Sinke | Belgium |
| The Dresser | | Peter Yates | United Kingdom |
| Funny Dirty Little War | No habrá más penas ni olvido | Héctor Olivera | Argentina |
| Flirt | | Roberto Russo | Italy |
| Love Streams | | John Cassavetes | United States |
| Man Under Suspicion | Morgen in Alabama | Norbert Kückelmann | West Germany |
| Man Without Memory | Mann ohne Gedächtnis | Kurt Gloor | Switzerland |
| The Noah's Ark Principle | Das Arche Noah Prinzip | Roland Emmerich | West Germany |
| Rembetiko | Ρεμπέτικο | Costas Ferris | Greece |
| Star 80 | | Bob Fosse | United States |
| Thieves After Dark | Les voleurs de la nuit | Samuel Fuller | France |
| Tight Quarters | Könnyü testi sértés | György Szomjas | Hungary |
| Wartime Romance | Военно-полевой роман | Pyotr Todorovsky | Soviet Union |
| Woman Doctors | Ärztinnen | Horst Seemann | East Germany |

=== Out of competition ===
- Marlene, directed by Maximilian Schell (West Germany)
- Nosferatu, directed by F. W. Murnau (Germany)
- Rue barbare, directed by Gilles Béhat (France)
- El señor Galíndez, directed by Rodolfo Kuhn (Argentina, Spain)
- Testament, directed by Lynne Littman (United States)
- Terms of Endearment, directed by James L. Brooks (United States)
- Wanderkrebs, directed by Herbert Achternbusch (West Germany)

=== Retrospective ===
The following films were shown in the retrospective dedicated to Ernst Lubitsch 1914-1933:

| English title | Original title | Director(s) | Production Country |
|---|---|---|---|
| Anna Boleyn | | Ernst Lubitsch | Germany |
| Broken Lullaby | | Ernst Lubitsch | United States |
| Carmen | | Ernst Lubitsch | Germany |
| The Merry Jail | Das fidele Gefängnis | Ernst Lubitsch | Germany |
| The Loves of Pharaoh | Das Weib des Pharao | Ernst Lubitsch | Germany |
| The Pride of the Firm | Der Stolz der Firma | Carl Wilhelm | Germany |
| Design for Living | | Ernst Lubitsch | United States |
| The Eyes of the Mummy Ma | Die Augen der Mumie Ma | Ernst Lubitsch | Germany |
| The Wildcat | Die Bergkatze | Ernst Lubitsch | Germany |
| The Flame | Die Flamme | Ernst Lubitsch | Germany |
| The Doll | Die Puppe | Ernst Lubitsch | Germany |
| Eternal Love | | Ernst Lubitsch | United States |
| Forbidden Paradise | | Ernst Lubitsch | United States |
| I Don't Want to Be a Man | Ich möchte kein Mann sein | Ernst Lubitsch | Germany |
| If I Had a Million | | Ernst Lubitsch | United States |
| Kohlhiesel's Daughters | Kohlhiesels Töchter | Ernst Lubitsch | Germany |
| Lady Windermere's Fan | | Ernst Lubitsch | United States |
| Madame Dubarry | | Ernst Lubitsch | Germany |
| Monte Carlo | | Ernst Lubitsch | United States |
| One Hour with You | | Ernst Lubitsch | United States |
| Romeo and Juliet in the Snow | Romeo und Julia im Schnee | Ernst Lubitsch | Germany |
| Rosita | | Ernst Lubitsch | United States |
| Shoe Palace Pinkus | Schuhpalast Pinkus | Ernst Lubitsch | Germany |
| Sumurun | | Ernst Lubitsch | Germany |
| So This Is Paris | | Ernst Lubitsch | United States |
| The Love Parade | | Ernst Lubitsch | United States |
| The Marriage Circle | | Ernst Lubitsch | United States |
| The Smiling Lieutenant | | Ernst Lubitsch | United States |
| The Student Prince in Old Heidelberg | | Ernst Lubitsch | United States |
| Three Women | | Ernst Lubitsch | United States |
| Trouble in Paradise | | Ernst Lubitsch | United States |
| When Four Do the Same | Wenn vier dasselbe tun | Ernst Lubitsch | Germany |

The following films were shown in the retrospective dedicated to Jules Dassin and Melina Mercouri:

| English title | Original title | Director(s) | Country |
|---|---|---|---|
| 10:30 P.M. Summer | | Jules Dassin | United States |
| A Dream of Passion | Κραυγή Γυναικών Kravgi gynaikon | Jules Dassin | Greece, Switzerland |
| Brute Force | | Jules Dassin | United States |
| He Who Must Die | Celui qui doit mourir | Jules Dassin | France |
| Rififi | Du rififi chez les hommes | Jules Dassin | France |
| Not a random story. Melina Mercouri - Jules Dassin | Keine zufällige Geschichte. Melina Mercouri - Jules Dassin | Charlotte Kerr | West Germany |
| Never on Sunday | Ποτέ την Κυριακή | Jules Dassin | Greece, United States |
| Night and the City | | Jules Dassin | United Kingdom |
| Phaedra | Φαίδρα | Jules Dassin | Greece |
| The Naked City | | Jules Dassin | United States |
| The Rehearsal | Η Δοκιμή I dokimi | Jules Dassin | Greece, United Kingdom |

=== Films in other sections ===
The festival's Forum section included a presentation of Memory of the Camps, a 1946 rough cut of the British feature-length account of Nazi wartime atrocities, German Concentration Camps Factual Survey, the significance of the unfinished work having only recently been understood.

== Official Awards ==
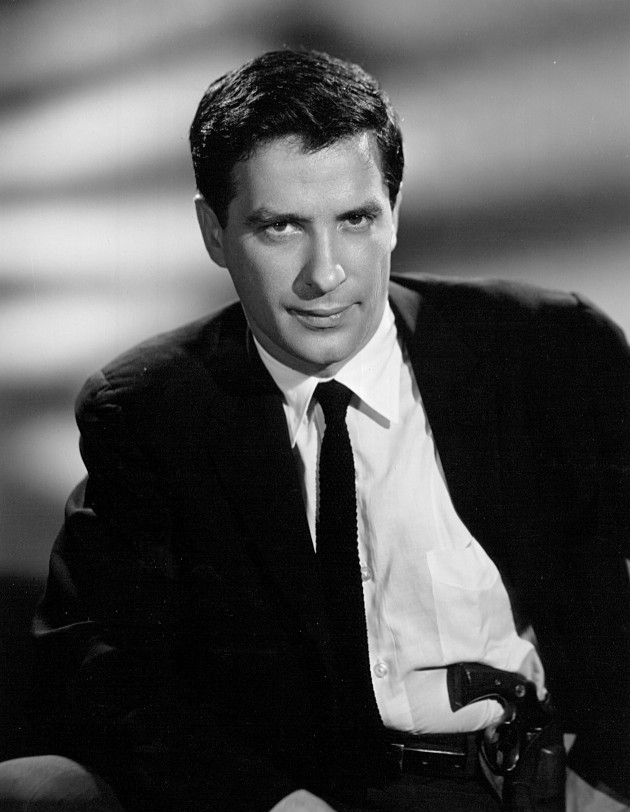
John Cassavetes, winner of the Golden Bear at the event

The following prizes were awarded by the Jury:

- Golden Bear: Love Streams by John Cassavetes
- Silver Bear – Special Jury Prize: Funny Dirty Little War by Héctor Olivera
- Silver Bear for Best Director: Ettore Scola for Le Bal
- Silver Bear for Best Actress: Inna Churikova for Wartime Romance
- Silver Bear for Best Actor: Albert Finney for The Dresser
- Silver Bear for an outstanding single achievement: Monica Vitti for Flirt
- Silver Bear:
  - Rembetiko by Costas Ferris
  - Man Under Suspicion by Norbert Kückelmann
- Honourable Mention: Jean-Marie Straub, Danièle Huillet for Klassenverhältnisse

== Independent Awards ==
=== FIPRESCI Award ===
- Love Streams by John Cassavetes and Funny Dirty Little War by Héctor Olivera
