= Night of the Pencils (film) =

- Theatrical release poster
- Directed by: Héctor Olivera
- Screenplay by: Héctor Olivera; Daniel Kon
- Based on: La noche de los lápices by María Seoane & Héctor Ruiz Núñez
- Produced by: Fernando Ayala; Alejandro Sessa
- Starring: Alejo García Pintos; Vita Escardó; Pablo Novak; Adriana Salonia; Pablo Machado; Leonardo Sbaraglia
- Cinematography: Leonardo Rodríguez Solís
- Edited by: Miguel López
- Music by: José Luis Castiñeira de Dios
- Production company: Aries Cinematográfica Argentina
- Distributed by: Aries Cinematográfica Argentina
- Release date: 4 September 1986 (Argentina)
- Running time: 105 minutes
- Country: Argentina
- Language: Spanish

Night of the Pencils (Spanish: La noche de los lápices) is a 1986 Argentine historical drama film directed by Héctor Olivera and written by Olivera and Daniel Kon. It is based on the non-fiction book by María Seoane and Héctor Ruiz Núñez. It stars Alejo García Pintos, Vita Escardó, Leonardo Sbaraglia, José María Monje, Pablo Machado, Adriana Salonia and Héctor Bidonde.

The film, based on the actual events recorded in history as the Night of the Pencils (La noche de los lápices), tells the story of seven students who, after protesting for lower bus fares for students in the city of La Plata, were abducted in September 1976, during Argentina's last dictatorship (1976–1983), and subsequently disappeared. Only one student survived to tell what happened. The civic-military dictatorship of Argentina called this period of state terrorism in the country the Dirty War, as a part of Operation Condor.

== Plot ==
During a time of economic and political unrest and State-sponsored terrorism in Argentina in the mid-1970s, the students want reduced bus fares, so they take to the streets and protest in support of the boleto estudiantil: the students' ticket. At first, under Isabel Perón's government they succeed, but their protests draw hostile attention from the ensuing military regime led by Jorge Rafael Videla, which overthrows Perón on March 24, 1976.

The dictatorship announces that the "leftist agitators" will not be tolerated by the new "government". The increasingly violent crackdown on student gatherings is demonstrated when the police break up a school dance brandishing guns. On September 16, six students of the city of La Plata are kidnapped in the middle of the night, and the police claims ignorance about their whereabouts. This is the actual event that will later be called "Night of the Pencils".

Pablo (Alejo García Pintos), the seventh member of the group, is abducted 5 days later by the police. He learns that his friends have been brutally tortured by governmental authorities and that he will receive the same treatment. The interrogators give him electric shocks while radio music and a pillow mask his cries.

Pablo is set free and tells the truth about the group's horrific story. However, his classmates were never found and became part of the thousands of desaparecidos of the dictatorship, who were kidnapped and never seen again.

== Cast ==
- Alejo García Pintos as Pablo Díaz
- Vita Escardó as Claudia Falcone
- Leonardo Sbaraglia as Daniel
- José María Monje as Panchito
- Pablo Machado as Claudio
- Adriana Salonia as María Clara
- Tina Serrano as Mrs. Falcone
- Héctor Bidonde as Mr. Falcone
- Alfonso De Grazia as Priest impersonator
- Lorenzo Quinteros as Raúl
- Juan Manuel Tenuta as the Rector
- Ana Celentano as Assembly delegate

== Background ==
The motion picture was based on the non-fiction book, La noche de los lápices, written by María Seoane and Héctor Ruiz Núñez. The book profiles seven high school student activists from La Plata, including lone survivor Pablo Díaz, who gives the authors his testimony. The students were kidnapped by the government after protesting for cheaper bus fare.

Pablo Díaz was transferred to legal incarceration and released on 19 November 1980. The other six students, however, were among the 236 Argentine teenagers who were kidnapped and disappeared during the military dictatorship.

== Production and distribution ==
The film was shot entirely in the city of La Plata.

Night of the Pencils first opened in Argentina on September 4, 1986. It has been featured at various film festivals including: the New York New Directors/New Films Festival, the Moscow Film Festival, and the Toronto Festival of Festivals.

In March 2003 the film was included in a slate of films shown at the 1st International Film Festival on Human Rights, held in Geneva, Switzerland.

== Reception ==
Critic Manavendra K. Thakur was appreciative of the direction of the film and wrote, "Olivera seems to have kept his integrity mostly intact. He does not shy away from disturbing realities, and he draws a surprisingly complex portrait of the students, their captors, and the students' parents. The film's accomplishment in this regard is considerable and therefore worthy of serious attention...[and] this is especially true of the film's second half."

Caryn James, film critic for The New York Times, also liked Olivera's work, and wrote, "Mr. Olivera builds his film on irony and contrast, so the visual beauty of the early scenes - the deep blue night in which cars and lights glisten - calls attention to the ominous unseen political dangers. In daylight, the once-beautiful, now crumbling buildings, including the high school itself, become emblems of a country falling apart, not knowing what to preserve from its past."

The film was nominated for the Golden Prize at the 15th Moscow International Film Festival.

== See also ==
- Night of the Pencils
- National Commission on the Disappearance of Persons
