= The Noah's Ark Principle =

1984 film

Das Arche Noah Prinzip
- Film poster
- Directed by: Roland Emmerich
- Written by: Roland Emmerich
- Produced by: Wolfgang Längsfeld; Hans Weth; Peter Zenk; Executive producers: Klaus Dittrich; Ulrich Limmer; Gabriele Walther
- Starring: Richy Müller; Franz Buchrieser
- Cinematography: Egon Werdin
- Edited by: Tomy Wigand
- Music by: Hubert Bartholomae
- Distributed by: Filmverlag der Autoren
- Release date: February 22, 1984
- Running time: 100 minutes
- Country: West Germany
- Language: German
- Budget: DEM 1,2 million

The Noah's Ark Principle (German: Das Arche Noah Prinzip) is a 1984 West German science fiction film written and directed by Roland Emmerich as his thesis at the Hochschule für Fernsehen und Film München (HFF).

While his fellow students typically raised and spent 20,000 Deutsche Mark for their final work, Emmerich managed to collect a budget of 1,200,000 DM (around US$600,000).

This film, shot in color with mono sound, received a rating of 12 in West Germany, and was sold to 20 countries. It was submitted to the 34th Berlin International Film Festival and received some acclaim for technical skill and special effects, but won no prizes.

== Plot ==
In 1997, a space shuttle lands at a secret military base where a young man, Billy, steps out and is interrogated by a military superior, Felix.

He begins recounting his story. Research is being carried out on possible control of the weather. The technical equipment for this is on board the Florida ARKLAB space station, which is jointly operated by the United States and Europe. There, the two astronauts Max and Billy are researching the possibilities of influencing the climate and weather patterns on Earth with microwaves.

Billy enjoys a close relationship with Max for the several months they spend together in isolation. Max's wife, Eva, contacts the ARKLAB to announce that she has decided to divorce him because his time away has strained their relationship.

At the same time, there is a coup d'état in Saudi Arabia which Billy is oblivious to but Max is closely watching on the TV. The technology of weather control becomes misused for military purposes. Control of the civilian station is taken over by the American military. When the station flies over Saudi Arabia, the systems are taken over by the ground and some substance is vented outside. Max asks the ground controllers for more info and is rebuffed.

It turns out that the effect of the microwave radiation is used as a cloak of invisibility for US forces against satellite-based reconnaissance and is thus intended to conceal a military intervention by the United States in Saudi Arabia from the UN.

Max uses Billy's security codes to uncover more classified information. Billy sees a news report that a US military operation to free hostages in Saudi Arabia has succeeded, but does not tell Max.

Max knows that the irradiation of the affected regions will most likely lead to severe natural disasters. He goes to manually disable the systems the next time they are supposed to spray radiation, but is injured in the process and the station itself gets damaged. Ground control relieves him of duty.

Two other astronauts, Eva and Gregor, are sent up on a Space Shuttle to help repair the reactor and ensure it is meeting its military objective. Gregor is authorized to enforce the orders of the military by force, Eva is supposed to exert influence on Max through her relationship with him.

Gregor has the order to carry out another irradiation for military reasons and is put under massive pressure by the military to carry it out. Max tries to stop him and attempts to leak information about the military plot to the European press. Gregor disconnects the wiring just before they are in communications range and seriously wounds Max with gunshots. Max kills him, and confesses his love for Eva before succumbing to his wounds.

However, the renewed use of the microwave emitters leads to a core meltdown in the already damaged reactor system. Gregor dies while trying to leave the station. Billy screams Max's name as the station falls apart. He and Eva escape in the shuttle as the station explodes.

Back on Earth, Felix then tells him that the monsoon set in early due to the microwave irradiation in India and that gigantic floods have occurred as a result with enormous casualties. Afterwards, Eva and Billy are taken away by soldiers.

Shortly afterwards, Felix hears on the news that the two have allegedly died of radiation poisoning they suffered in the disaster at the station. He then destroys the recordings of the interrogation.

== Cast ==
- Richy Müller as Billy Hayes
- Franz Buchrieser as Max Marek
- Aviva Joel as Eva Thompson
- Matthias Fuchs as Felix Kronenberg
- Nicolas Lansky as Gregor Vandenberg
- Matias Heller as Security Guard

== Production ==
The film was the first writing and directing effort of West German born filmmaker Roland Emmerich after his graduation from the German Film and Television Academy. Emmerich's inspiration for the film came about from the continued success and appeal of Star Wars which Emmerich had studied as part of his degree requirement. After accruing 1 million Marks from sources such as Bernd Eichinger's Constantin Film, Solaris-Film, and the academy itself, Emmerich assembled a young team, and converted an unused factory hall into a studio. When filming wrapped, special effects were added at the large Bavaria Studios in Munich. Shortly thereafter, Emmerich would establish his own production company, Centropolis Entertainment.
