= Ivo Cutzarida =

Argentine actor, politician, and director

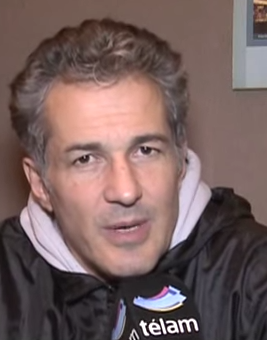
Ivo Cutzarida being interviewed (2013)

Ivo Cutzarida (born 29 September 1962) is an Argentine actor, politician, and director. He has produced both Argentine and American soap operas.

== Early life ==
Cutzarida is the son of Romanian philosopher Nicolae Cutzarida. He was born in the neighborhood of San Isidro, in Buenos Aires. He has two brothers, Alejandro and Radu (1961–1997). His stepmother is French actress Dominique Sanda.

He completed half of law school before dedicating himself to acting. He worked for five years in tribunals, including a brief incursion in political activism, during which period he supported Raúl Alfonsín. He began his studies in theater with Lito Cruz in 1991.

== Career ==
He began his professional career in 1987 with the Argentine soap opera Sin marido. Since then has dedicated himself exclusively to acting. He has appeared on film and television in more than a dozen countries and in three languages.

=== Television ===
His tv career began in 1988 when he acted in the soap opera Amándote (Loving You). Later came the soap operas Sin Marido (Without a Husband) and No va más as Maximiliano.

A year later, Cutzarida played Alberto in the soap opera La extraña dama (The Strange Lady).

In the 1990s, Cutzarida was part of the popular soap opera Una voz en el teléfono, playing Santiago. He appeared in other soap operas such as Socorro, 5o Año (Help! 5th Year) as the coordinator of the group of graduates and in Los tuyos y los míos (Yours and Mine).

In 1991, he was part of Detective de señoras. In 1992, he was in La elegida (The chosen one) as Alberto. One year later he played Martín in Déjate querer (Let me love you) and played Pippo, Father Miguel, in Celeste, siempre Celeste.

In 1994, Cutzarida worked in Grande pa! aired by Telefe and in 1995 in Nueve Lunas (9 Moons) and La hermana mayor (The Older Sister).

In 1996, he participated in the soap opera Son cosas de novela. He also participated in the filming of Adiós, abuelo (Goodbye, grandfather).

Following a period outside Argentina, Cutzarida returned in 1997, playing Lucio in the soap opera Carola Casini.

After thirteen years in Mexico and the US, where he acted in Ángeles (Angels), Legacy como Edward de Sosa, and Tuesdays with Morrie (1999) as Armand and Noriega: God's Favorite (2000), in the episode "Who Do You Know?" of the series Soul Food (2001), and in Polly and Marie (2007). He returned to Argentina in the soap opera Champs 12 in 2009.

In 2010 he was invited for special participation as Andrés Soriano in the soap opera Malparida.

In 2012, Cutzarida participated in the tele comedy Graduados (Graduates). Cutzarida played Dr. Fernando Ponte Vedra.

He was part of the miniseries 23 pares (23 pairs).

In 2013, he acted in the soap opera Sos mi hombre (You're my man) as "Facha" Vargas. At the end of the same year, he played one of the antagonists in the soap opera Taxxi, amores cruzados (Taxxi, criss-crossed loves).

In 2014, Cutzarida was part of the cast of the Telefe soap opera Somos Familia (We are family).
