= Festival du Film Policier de Cognac =

Coordinates: 45°42′N 0°20′W

The Festival du Film policier de Cognac (English: Cognac Crime Film Festival), also known as Cognac Festival du Film Policier, was an annual film festival that took place in Cognac, France from 1982 to 2007.

== History ==
The inaugural Festival du Film policier de Cognac was held in 1982, and it was held each year after than apart from 1991, until 2007. The festival focused on the police/crime genre and, after 1993, featured a short film and a television film competition.

In 2007, the wine syndicate Bureau National Interprofessionel du Cognac announced that it was withdrawing its support of the 25-year-old film event. Without its main backer, the festival ended. However, another famed wine city, Beaune, Côte d'Or, saw value in the format and two years later launched a successor: the Festival international du Film policier de Beaune.

Since 2010, the Cognac-based Polar: Le Festival – originally a strictly literary event – has incorporated a film competition, albeit on a much smaller scale, to compensate for the loss of the original film festival to Beaune.

=== Festival Polar de Cognac ===
In 1996, capitalising on the popularity of the film festival, an unrelated festival, the Festival Polar de Cognac, was established by Bernard Bec in 1996. This festival, which now covers crime and thriller fiction in novels, comics, film, television and theatre, has continued until today (as of 2024).

== Grand Prix awards ==
Poster of Festival du Film Policier de Cognac.

- 1982: Beyond Reasonable Doubt (1980)
- 1983: 48 Hrs. (1982)
- 1984: L'Addition (1984)
- 1985: Funny Dirty Little War (1983)
- 1986: The Hitcher (1986)
- 1987: The Big Easy (1987)
- 1988: The Cat (1988)
- 1989: True Believer (1989)
- 1990: Kill Me Again (1989)
- 1992: The Hand That Rocks the Cradle (1992)
- 1993: One False Move (1992)
- 1994: The Escort (1993)
- 1995: Shallow Grave (1994)
- 1996: The Last Supper (1995)
- 1997: Freeway (1996)
- 1998: Face (1997)
- 1999: Another Day in Paradise (1997)
- 2000: Une affaire de goût (2000)
- 2001: Chopper (2000)
- 2002: Nueve reinas (2000)
- 2003: La caja 507 (2002)
- 2004: Salinui chueok (2003)
- 2005: Crimen ferpecto (2004)
- 2006: Silentium (2004)
- 2007: A Very British Gangster
