= A Universal History of Infamy =

Short stories collection by Jorge Luis Borges

- First edition (1935)
- Author: Jorge Luis Borges
- Original title: Historia universal de la infamia
- Translator: Norman Thomas di Giovanni
- Language: Spanish
- Publisher: Editorial Tor (1935); Emecé (1954)
- Publication date: 1935, 1954
- Publication place: Argentina
- English publication date: 1972
- Media type: Print
- ISBN: 0-525-47546-X
- OCLC: 541339

A Universal History of Infamy, or A Universal History of Iniquity (original Spanish title: Historia universal de la infamia), is a collection of short stories by Argentine writer Jorge Luis Borges, first published in 1935, and revised by the author in 1954. Most were published individually in the newspaper Crítica between 1933 and 1934. Angel Flores, the first to use the term "magical realism", set the beginning of the movement with this book.

The stories (except Hombre de la esquina rosada) are fictionalised accounts of real criminals. The sources are listed at the end of the book, but Borges makes many alterations in the retelling—arbitrary or otherwise—particularly to dates and names, so the accounts cannot be relied upon as historical. In particular, The Disinterested Killer diverges from its source material.

Two English translations exist, the first from 1972 and the second from 1999 (part of a collected edition, published as a separate book in 2004). The 1972 English edition (A Universal History of Infamy, ISBN 0-525-47546-X) was translated by Norman Thomas di Giovanni. The 2004 English edition (A Universal History of Iniquity, ISBN 0-14-243789-1), translated by Andrew Hurley, was published by Penguin Classics, a division of British publisher Penguin Books.

Borges was reluctant to authorise a translation. In his preface to the 1954 edition, Borges distanced himself somewhat from the book, which he gave as an example of the baroque, "when art flaunts and squanders its resources"; he wrote that the stories are "the irresponsible sport of a shy sort of man who could not bring himself to write short stories, and so amused himself by changing and distorting (sometimes without aesthetic justification) the stories of other men" and that "there is nothing beneath all the storm and the lightning."

== Contents ==
Original Spanish title	English (1972)	English (2004)	Central characters
El atroz redentor Lazarus Morell	The Dread Redeemer Lazarus Morell	The Cruel Redeemer Lazarus Morell	John Murrell
El impostor inverosímil Tom Castro	Tom Castro, the Implausible Imposter	The Improbable Imposter Tom Castro	Arthur Orton
La viuda Ching, pirata	The Widow Ching, Lady Pirate	The Widow Ching – Pirate	Ching Shih
El proveedor de iniquidades Monk Eastman	Monk Eastman, Purveyor of Iniquities	Monk Eastman, Purveyor of Iniquities	Monk Eastman
El asesino desinteresado Bill Harrigan	The Disinterested Killer Bill Harrigan	The Disinterested Killer Bill Harrigan	Billy the Kid
El incivil maestro de ceremonias Kotsuké no Suké	The Insulting Master of Etiquette Kôtsuké no Suké	The Uncivil Teacher of Court Etiquette Kôtsuké no Suké	Kira Yoshinaka
El tintorero enmascarado Hákim de Merv	The Masked Dyer, Hakim of Merv	Hakim, the Masked Dyer of Merv	Al-Muqanna
Hombre de la esquina rosada	Streetcorner Man	Man on Pink Corner	
Etcétera	Et cetera	Et cetera	
Un teólogo en la muerte	A Theologian in Death	A Theologian in Death	Philipp Melanchthon
La cámara de las estatuas	The Chamber of Statues	The Chamber of Statues	
Historia de los dos que soñaron	Tale of the Two Dreamers	The Story of the Two Dreamers	
El brujo postergado	The Wizard Postponed	The Wizard that was Made to Wait	
El espejo de tinta	The Mirror of Ink	The Mirror of Ink	
Un doble de Mahoma (added 1954)	A Double for Mohammed	Mahomed's Double	
El enemigo generoso (added 1954)	The Generous Enemy	The Generous Enemy	
Del rigor en la ciencia (added 1954)	On Exactitude in Science	On Exactitude in Science	

== See also ==
- Bibliography of Jorge Luis Borges
