= Héctor Bidonde =

Argentine actor (1937–2024)

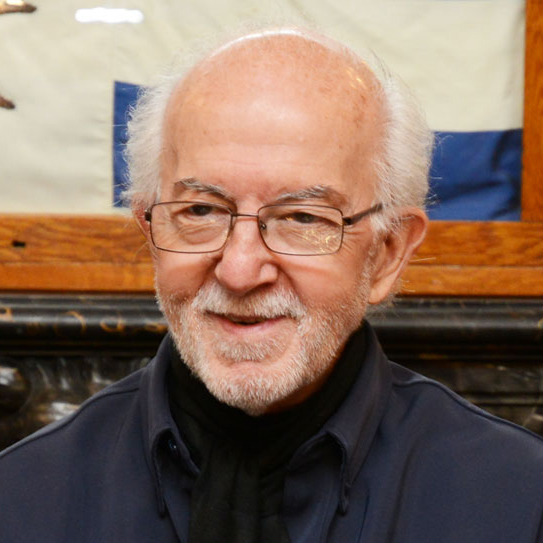
- Born: 2 March 1937; La Plata, Buenos Aires Province, Argentina
- Died: 19 January 2024 (aged 86)
- Occupation: Actor

Héctor Pastor Bidonde (2 March 1937 – 19 January 2024) was an Argentine actor.

== Life and career ==
Born in La Plata, he was a shift worker in a tool and dye factory when, in 1954, he was offered a part in Carlos P. Cabral's play Amarretes. He was accepted in the Buenos Aires Province Comedy, in 1964, and performed extensively in the theatre before being offered his first film role in Mario David's La rabona (1978).

Numerous supporting roles followed, among them as that of an unhappily married husband in María Luisa Bemberg's Momentos (1981) and of a hard-line chief of police in Roberto Denis' Luna Caliente (1985). His roles for director Héctor Olivera as the scheming Suprino in Funny Dirty Little War (1983) and as Dr. Falcone, the father of a student abducted by the police in the fact-based Night of the Pencils (1986) made him prominent in Argentine film.

Bidonde returned to the theatre and to Argentine public television in subsequent years. Among his notable later film performances was one in Daniel Barone's Alma mía (1999). Politically active in left-wing politics in Argentina, Bidonde was elected to the Buenos Aires City Legislature, where he served from October 2003 to September 2007. He also ran as running-mate for Socialist Workers' Movement candidate Vilma Ripoll in the 2007 presidential election.

Bidonde died on 19 January 2024, at the age of 86.

== Filmography (partial) ==
- Después del final (TBA) (last film role)
- Chile 672 (2006)
- A cada lado (2005)
- Gallito Ciego (2001)
- Alma mía (1999)
- Nosotros (1993)
- Con la misma bronca (1988)
- Caminos del maíz (1988)
- La Noche de los lápices (1986) a.k.a. Night of the Pencils
- Perros de la noche (1986)
- Otra historia de amor (1986)
- Sobredosis (1986)
- La Cruz invertida (1985)
- Luna caliente (1985)
- El Sol en botellitas (1985)
- Otra esperanza (1984)
- No habrá más penas ni olvido (1983), a.k.a. Funny Dirty Little War
- Momentos (1981)
- Tiro al aire (1980)
- La isla (1979)
- La rabona (1978)

== Television ==
- Dromo (2009) TV Uniseries.
- El hombre que volvió de la muerte (2007) TV Miniseries.
- 1000 millones (2002) TV Series, a.k.a. Love Heritage.
- Los simuladores "El Pequeño Problema del Gran Hombre" (2002) TV Uniseries, a.k.a. Pretenders.
- Culpables (2001) TV Uniseries.
- Gasoleros (1998) TV Series.
- Hombre de mar (1997) TV Series.
- Germán y Patricia (1995) "Alta comedia" 1 Episode.
- Zona de riesgo (1993) TV Uniseries.
- Estado civil (1990) TV Uniseries.
- El prontuario del Señor K (1987) Especiales de ATC.
- Alguien como usted (1984) TV Series.
- Compromiso (1983) TV Uniseries.
- Dios se lo pague (1981) TV Series.
- El solitario (1980) TV Miniseries.
- Hombres en pugna (1980) Especiales de ATC.
