= María Seoane =

Argentinian writer and journalist (1948–2023)

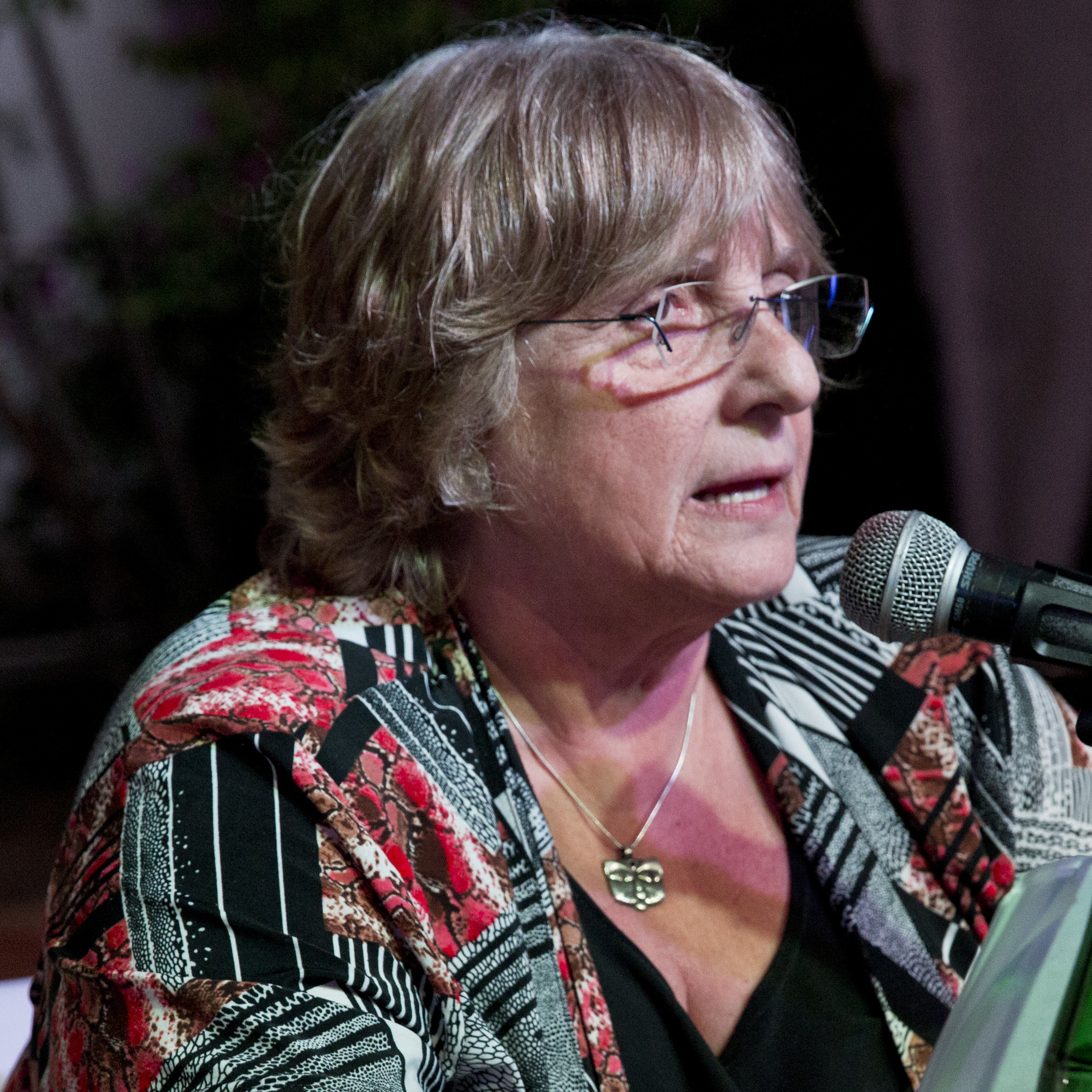
- Seoane in 2015
- Born: 25 January 1948; Buenos Aires, Argentina
- Died: 27 December 2023 (aged 75)
- Education: University of Buenos Aires
- Occupations: Economist, journalist, writer, film director
- Awards: Konex Award (1994); King of Spain Prize (1998)

María Seoane (25 January 1948 – 27 December 2023) was an Argentine economist, journalist, and writer who ventured into film. She won numerous awards and published eight books on political issues in Argentine history. She was the director of LRA Radio Nacional from 2009 until her resignation on 21 December 2015. Seoane died on 27 December 2023, at the age of 75.

== Career ==
Seoane had a degree in Economics from the University of Buenos Aires.

She served as:

- National political editor of the journal El Periodista de Buenos Aires (1985–1989)
- National political editor of the newspaper Sur (1989–1990)
- Editor-in-chief of the Argentine section of the magazine Noticias (1992–1994)
- Deputy secretary of national political editing (from 1994)
- Director of the Clarín newspaper supplement Zona (1998)

She published contributions in:

- The Mexican magazine Di
- The Mexican newspapers Uno Más Uno and El Universal
- The Turin magazine Nueva Sociedad

== Academics ==
Seoane was a professor in the Journalism Master's program of the Chair of Journalistic Research at the University of San Andrés (Buenos Aires), and Columbia University (United States).

Seoane was an OAS consultant, and prepared reports on freedom of expression for the Inter-American Commission on Human Rights.

== Militancy ==
In 1990s Seoane joined the select group of the Journalists' Association.

In 2002, she signed a request from the Journalists' Association criticizing the detention of Ernestina Herrera de Noble by Judge Roberto Marquevich, due to the alleged appropriation of two children of disappeared persons.

During the government of Néstor Kirchner she was director of the magazine Caras y Caretas. In 2009, under Cristina Fernández, she became Executive Director of LRA Radio Nacional. She resigned the position on 21 December 2015.

Seoane was a member of the group COMUNA, in favour of democratic communication.

== Books ==
- La noche de los lápices, chronicle co-authored with Héctor Ruiz Núñez, Editorial Contrapunto, 1986
- Menem, la patria sociedad anónima, essay, Editorial Gente Sur, 1990
- Todo o nada. Biografía de Mario Roberto Santucho, Editorial Planeta, 1991
- El burgués maldito. Biografía de José Ber Gelbard, Editorial Planeta, 1998
- El dictador. Biografía de Jorge Rafael Videla, co-author, Editorial Sudamericana, 2001
- El saqueo de la Argentina, about privatizations; written in collaboration with Eduardo Basualdo and others, 2001
- Nosotros : apuntes sobre pasiones, razones y trampas de los argentinos entre dos siglos. Sudamericana, 2005
- Argentina. El siglo del progreso y la oscuridad, Planeta, 2006
- El enigma Perrotta, Sudamericana, 2011
- Bravas. Alicia Eguren de Cooke y Susana Pirí Lugones. Sudamericana, 2014, ISBN 9789500747394
- El nieto. La trágica y luminosa historia de Ignacio "Guido" Montoya Carlotto, with Roberto Caballero, Sudamericana, May 2015

=== Notebooks of Caras y Caretas ===
- La noche de los bastones largos (2006)
- La noche de la dictadura (2006)
- Evita, esa mujer (2007)
- Rodolfo Walsh, la palabra no se rinde (2007)
- La tragedia y la comedia en la Argentina (2008)
- El Cordobazo (2009)

== Film ==
Seoane's first book, The Night of Pencils (La noche de los lápices), was adapted into a film of the same name by Argentine director Héctor Olivera.

Seoane ventured into directing with the documentary Gelbard, historia secreta del último burgués nacional (along with Carlos Castro, 2006), about the former Economy Minister José Ber Gelbard.

Seoane also directed the 2011 animated film Eva from Argentina, focusing on the historical figures Eva Perón and Rodolfo Walsh.

== Awards ==
- 1991 Book of the Year (chosen by Argentine critics) for Todo o nada
- 1994 Konex Award for Biographies and Memoirs
- 1998 King of Spain Prize for her journalistic investigation published in Clarín on the 1976 military coup
- 2000 Julio Cortázar Award from the Argentine Book Chamber
- Lifetime Achievement Award from the Henry Moore Foundation (2000)
- 2002 Rodolfo Walsh Award from the National University of La Plata's Faculty of Journalism and Communication
- 2003 Al Maestro con Cariño Award from Taller Escuela Agencia
