= La Rabona =

- Directed by: Mario David
- Written by: Isaac Aisemberg; Mario David
- Starring: Alberto Closas; Claudia Cárpena; Perla Santalla
- Cinematography: José Santiso
- Edited by: Luis César D'Angiolillo
- Music by: Atilio Stampone
- Production company: Fotograma SRL Producciones Cinematográficas
- Release date: 22 March 1979
- Running time: 90 minutes
- Country: Argentina
- Language: Spanish

La Rabona ("The Truant") is a 1979 Argentine comedy film directed by Mario David. It stars Alberto Closas, Claudia Cárpena, and Perla Santalla. The screenplay was written by the director Mario David, working in collaboration with Isaac Aisemberg. Atilio Stampone composed the soundtrack.

== Plot ==
A man and his daughter, tired of family feuding and their routines, skip work and school the same day.

== Cast ==
- Alberto Closas
- Claudia Cárpena
- Perla Santalla
- Eva Franco
- Arturo García Buhr
- Carlos Moreno
- Ricardo Darín
- Ricardo Lavié
- Miguel Coppola
- Héctor Bidonde
- Mangacha Gutiérrez
- Pepita Muñoz
- Roberto Lagos
- Juan Vitali
- Mario Savino
- Raúl Ricutti
- Juan Quetglas
- Eduardo Trillo
- Edmundo Mattar
- Claudia Nelson
- Pepita Ferez
- Martha Fendriz
- Miguel Papparelli
- Karina David
- Rodolfo Brindisi

== Production ==
La Rabona was produced by Horacio Parisotto and Mario Fasola under the Fotograma SRL Producciones Cinematográficas production company. The screenplay was written by the director Mario David, working in collaboration with Isaac Aisemberg. Cinematographer José Santiso was hired to shoot the film. Atilio Stampone composed the soundtrack.

== Reception ==
Néstor, writing in Esquiú wrote: "Well-intentioned and with a certain moralizing tendency... the liberality of modernist customs contrasts with the modesty and purity of the traditional family habits". Rafael Granados opined: "Mario David constructs a sensitive film, whose images are spoken softly". In their 2001 book Un diccionario de films argentinos (1930-1995), Raúl Manrupe and María Alejandra Portela describe the film as a "discreet effort to get away from an industry in crisis, in a difficult time not only for the cinema".

== See also ==
- List of Argentine films of 1979
