= Tight Quarters =

1983 film

- Directed by: György Szomjas
- Written by: György Szomjas; Sándor Fábry; Ferenc Grunwalsky; Csaba Kardos
- Produced by: András Elek
- Starring: Mariann Erdős
- Cinematography: Ferenc Grunwalsky
- Edited by: Klára Majoros
- Release date: 27 October 1983
- Running time: 85 minutes
- Country: Hungary
- Language: Hungarian

Tight Quarters (Hungarian: Könnyű testi sértés) is a 1983 Hungarian drama film directed by György Szomjas. It was entered into the 34th Berlin International Film Festival.

== Cast ==
- Mariann Erdős as Éva
- Nóra Görbe as Éva (voice)
- Károly Eperjes as Csaba
- Péter Andorai as Miklós
- Edit Ábrahám as Zsuzsa
- Vera Molnar as Jutka
- Gergely Bikácsy as Szomszéd
- Erzsi Cserhalmi as Kolléganő
