= Bajo el signo de la patria =

- Directed by: René Múgica
- Written by: Isaac Aisemberg
- Starring: Ignacio Quirós; Enrique Liporace; Héctor Pellegrini
- Cinematography: Aníbal González Paz
- Edited by: Gerardo Rinaldi
- Music by: Eduardo Falú
- Release date: 20 May 1971
- Running time: 110 minutes
- Country: Argentina
- Language: Spanish

Bajo el signo de la patria is a 1971 Argentine drama film directed by René Múgica and written by Isaac Aisemberg. The film premiered in Argentina in May 1971.

== Cast ==
- Ignacio Quirós as General Manuel Belgrano
- Enrique Liporace
- Héctor Pellegrini
- Roberto Airaldi
- Leonor Benedetto
- Mario Passano
- Reynaldo Mompel
- Martín Adjemián
- Aldo Mayo
- Gloria Leyland
- Mario Lozano
- Juan Carlos Lamas
- Hugo Mújica
- Aldo Barbero
- Jesús Pampín
- Néstor Zembrini
