= Peter Lilienthal =

German film director, writer, actor and producer (1927–2023)

- Born: 27 November 1927; Berlin, Germany
- Died: 28 April 2023 (aged 95); Munich, Bavaria, Germany
- Occupations: Film director Screenwriter; Actor
- Years active: 1958–2007

Peter Lilienthal (27 November 1927 – 28 April 2023) was a German film director, writer, actor and producer. He is most associated with being a liberal director of New German Cinema in the 1970s.

== Early life ==
As a child, in 1939, Lilienthal emigrated to Montevideo, Uruguay, with his parents to escape the Nazis. He only returned to Germany in 1956 to attend a film school.

== Career ==
In the 1960s and 1970s, Lilienthal was among directors who focused on social criticism, along with Wim Wenders and Rainer Werner Fassbinder. In 1970 he directed Malatesta with Eddie Constantine and Christine Noonan, which contains some biographical aspects of the life of the Italian anarchist Errico Malatesta. The film was featured at the 1970 Cannes Film Festival. In 1975, Lilienthal shot Calm Prevails Over the Country (Es herrscht Ruhe im Land), based on a screenplay by Antonio Skármeta. The picture was screened at the Hof International Film Festival.

His 1979 film David, about a son of a rabbi wo survives the Nazi regime, won the Golden Bear at the 29th Berlin International Film Festival. In 1982 he directed American actor Joe Pesci in Dear Mr. Wonderful, his first American endeavor. The Uprising (Der Aufstand or La insurrección) followed, another collaboration with Skármeta in 1980, a film which was made in Costa Rica and depicts the Nicaraguan Revolution.

Lilienthal's 1984 film Das Autogramm was entered into the 34th Berlin International Film Festival. Lilienthal was the first director of the department Film- und Medienkunst (The art of film and media) of the Akademie der Künste in Berlin from 1985, holding the position until 1996. In 1996, he was a member of the jury at the 46th Berlin International Film Festival. He was awarded the Order of Merit of the Federal Republic of Germany in 2000.

Lilienthal died in Munich on 28 April 2023, at the age of 95.

== Filmography ==
=== Director ===
- 1958: Studie 23 (co-directors: Pit Kroke, Jörg Müller, Ralph Wünsche), short
- 1959: Ausflug mit Damen (co-director Wolfgang Spier — Based on a play by Friedrich Michael)
- 1960: Die Nachbarskinder (segment of the anthology film Der Nachbar, screenplay: Benno Meyer-Wehlack), short
- 1961: Biographie eines Schokoladentages (screenplay: Dieter Gasper)
- 1962: Der 18. Geburtstag (screenplay: Theodor Kotulla, Klaus Roehler)
- 1962: Stück für Stück (screenplay: Benno Meyer-Wehlack)
- 1962: Picknick im Felde (screenplay: Peter Lilienthal — Based on a play by Fernando Arrabal), short
- 1963: Striptease (based on a play by Sławomir Mrożek), short
- 1963: Schule der Geläufigkeit (screenplay: Dieter Gasper), short
- 1964: Das Martyrium des Peter O'Hey (screenplay: Günther Kieser, Peter Lilienthal — Based on a play by Sławomir Mrożek)
- 1965: Guernica – Jede Stunde verletzt und die letzte tötet (based on a play by Fernando Arrabal), short
- 1965: Seraphine oder Die wundersame Geschichte der Tante Flora (screenplay: Peter Lilienthal — Based on a play by David Perry), short
- 1966: Abschied (screenplay: Günter Herburger)
- 1966: Der Beginn (screenplay: Günter Herburger, Peter Lilienthal)
- 1967: Unbeschriebenes Blatt (screenplay: Peter Lilienthal — Based on a play by Rhys Adrian)
- 1967: Abgründe (screenplay: Peter Schneider, George Moorse, Peter Lilienthal — Anthology film based on stories by Stanley Ellin and Patrick Quentin)
- 1967: A Premeditated Crime (screenplay: Piers Paul Read, Peter Lilienthal — Based on a story by Witold Gombrowicz)
- 1968: Tramp oder Der einzige und unvergleichliche Lenny Jacobson (screenplay: Peter Lilienthal — Based on a play by Barry Bermange)
- 1969: Horror (screenplay: Peter Lilienthal — Based on novel "How Awful About Allan" by Henry Farrell)
- 1970: Malatesta (screenplay: Heathcote Williams, Michael Koser, Peter Lilienthal)
- 1971: Die Sonne angreifen (screenplay: Robert Muller, Peter Lilienthal — Based on a novel by Witold Gombrowicz)
- 1971: Jakob von Gunten (screenplay: Ror Wolf, Peter Lilienthal — Based on the novel Jakob von Gunten by Robert Walser)
- 1973: La Victoria (screenplay: Antonio Skármeta, Peter Lilienthal)
- 1975: Schoolmaster Hofer (screenplay: Herbert Brödl, Peter Lilienthal — Based on Hauptlehrer Hofer by Günter Herburger)
- 1975: Calm Prevails Over the Country (screenplay: Antonio Skármeta, Peter Lilienthal)
- 1979: David (screenplay: Jurek Becker, Peter Lilienthal — Based on Den Netzen entronnen by Joel König)
- 1980: The Uprising (screenplay: Antonio Skármeta, Peter Lilienthal)
- 1982: Dear Mr. Wonderful (screenplay: Sam Koperwas)
- 1984: Das Autogramm (screenplay: Peter Lilienthal — Based on Cuarteles de invierno by Osvaldo Soriano)
- 1986: The Silence of the Poet (screenplay: Peter Lilienthal — Based on The Continuing Silence of a Poet by A. B. Yehoshua)
- 1988: Der Radfahrer von San Cristóbal (screenplay: Antonio Skármeta, Peter Lilienthal)
- 1995: Wasserman – Der singende Hund (screenplay: Peter Lilienthal — Based on a story by Yoram Kaniuk)
- 1995: Angesichts der Wälder (screenplay: Peter Lilienthal — Based on a story by A. B. Yehoshua)

Documentaries

- 1959: Im Handumdrehen verdient
- 1964: Marl – Das Porträt einer Stadt
- 1969: Noon in Tunisia
- 1970: Ich, Montag – Ich, Dienstag – Ich, Mittwoch – Ich, Donnerstag. Portrait Gombrowicz
- 1971: Start Nr. 9
- 1972: Shirley Chisholm for President
- 1977: Kadir
- 2001: Denk ich an Deutschland …: Ein Fremder
- 2007: Camilo: The Long Road to Disobedience

=== Actor ===
- 1972: Dead Pigeon on Beethoven Street – Carlos
- 1977: The American Friend – Marcangelo
- 1978: I See This Land from Afar – Pfarrer Hendrich
- 1979: Milo Milo
- 1983: Der Platzanweiser – Porträt eines Kinomanen
