= Canal 7 Televisión =

Television station in Madrid (1996–2014)

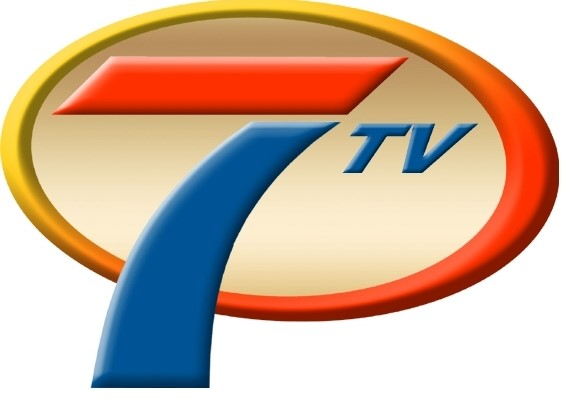
- Country: Spain
- Broadcast area: Community of Madrid

Programming
- Language: Spanish
- Picture format: 1080i HDTV

Ownership
- Owner: José Frade

History
- Launched: 12 June 1996; 30 years ago
- Closed: 29 January 2014; 12 years ago

Canal 7 Televisión was an independent local television station in the Community of Madrid owned by film producer José Frade. Founded in 1996, it achieved its highest ratings between 2002 and 2005. Its final years on digital terrestrial television were marked by a programming decay, to an extent where most of its schedule was occupied by teleshopping. It finally closed in 2014.

== History ==
The station started broadcasting on 12 June 1996 using the equipment and infrastructure of a prior local television station that existed in Madrid, Canal 47. Its first director of programming was José Miguel Azpiroz, formerly of Tele 5, where he hired contracts with television and showbiz figures to present its flagship programs. Its line-up consisted of classic TV series and feature films, as well as game shows, programs for the youth and women, and news catering Madrid. It broadcast on UHF channel 35 (as well as UHF 23 in test mode) and on UHF 47 in the south of the community. One of its earliest programs was El Precio Justo, which had been on TVE since 1988, and moved to Canal 7 upon its launch.

In March 2001, the station sealed an agreement with Anny Producciones Audiovisuales, production company of Valencian talk show La Tómbola, which had left Telemadrid's schedules. Ratings of the talk show fell from around 400,000 on Telemadrid to 100,000 on its first airing on Canal 7. By 2002, Canal 7 Televisión had become the most watched local television station in Spain, attracting a potential audience of 1,203,000 viewers. When La Tómbola ended on Canal Nou, there was expectation that the production company could move its production to Madrid on this channel.

On the morning of 28 September 2007, the channel was reportedly airing a pornographic movie, outside of the watershed.

Original programming continued until as late as 2010, though it was also airing fortune telling, Latin American telenovelas and the Televisión de Galicia variety show Luar. By 2011, the channel's programming was reduced to eighteen hours of EHS teleshopping a day (6am-12am) and an overnight erotic chat (12am-6am). It was reported that the channel closed permanently in January 2014, when the channel's logo was replaced in its headquarters by one from Frade Producciones Cinematográficas.
