= Ángel María de Lera =

Spanish writer (1912–1984)

Ángel María de Lera (Baides, May 7, 1912 – Madrid, July 23, 1984) was a Spanish novelist.

== Biography ==
He was born in Baides, Guadalajara, on May 7, 1912. His father was a doctor with the municipal charity. He spent his childhood in various towns in Castile and La Rioja. While still a child, he entered the Minor Seminary of Vitoria, where he studied Latin and Humanities for five years. He then went on to the Conciliar Seminary, where he studied Theology and Philosophy, until he suffered a crisis of faith and dropped out in 1930. After his father died during a flu epidemic while he was practicing medicine, his mother was granted a job as a lottery administrator in La Línea de la Concepción (Cádiz), and so the Lera family moved to Andalusia. There he finished high school and began independent law studies at the University of Granada in 1932 while living in the city of Cádiz. From 1932 he wrote for the anarchist newspaper La Tierra under the pseudonym "Ángel de Samaniego" and, critical of the CNT's line, joined the Syndicalist Party following a visit by Ángel Pestaña to La Línea in 1935.

When the 1936 military uprising broke out and, with its partial failure, the Civil War began, he escaped to Málaga via Gibraltar and decided to enlist in a military unit. By September, he was back in Madrid; he contributed to El Sindicalista, was a member of his party's national committee, and in late October, he was appointed by Largo Caballero as his party's representative as war commissioner, with the mission of boosting combat morale and halting the rapid advance of the rebel troops and, subsequently, of besieged Madrid. At the end of 1937, he joined the 549th Battalion of the 138th Mixed Brigade attached to the 33rd Division of the IV Army Corps, under the command of Cipriano Mera, where he rose to the rank of major. He witnessed the events of Casado's coup in Madrid. Although he did not want to participate in the clashes, he spent a few days detained by those loyal to the Negrinista faction. His experiences during the war—and particularly the Republican agony—are captured in the novel Las últimas banderas (The Last Flags), which won the Planeta Prize in 1967.

At the end of the war, he decided to remain in Madrid and was arrested three weeks later. In 1939, he was sentenced to death by a summary court martial, a sentence that was commuted to thirty years. He was released on parole in 1944, but was arrested again and sentenced to 21 years. He remained in prison until December 1947. After his release, he had to take on jobs as a bricklayer, street sweeper, freelance writer, and insurance agent, until he landed a position as an accountant at a small liquor factory in Madrid. Little by little, he began to contribute to the press until he published his first novel, entitled Los olvidados (The Forgotten Ones), in 1957. He was then able to dedicate himself professionally to writing. His novel The Wedding was adapted for the cinema in 1964 under the direction of Lucas Demare. Among the newspapers in which he collaborated is ABC. He was the author of novels such as A Man Is Sold (1973), with which he won the Ateneo de Sevilla Prize, Dark Dawn, The Man Who Returned from Paradise (1979), Kidnapping in Puerta de Hierro (1982) and Peace Came With Them (1984).

In 1978, he published Ángel Pestaña. Retrato de un anarquista (Angel Pestaña. Portrait of an Anarchist), a biography of the anarcho-syndicalist Ángel Pestaña. Despite the author's "good craftsmanship," the lack of critical commentary and bibliography has been criticized. In this work, the author does not hide his "sympathies" with the subject of his biography, whom he met in person and with whom he was a coreligionist.

His work is framed within post-war realism, with a strong social content, and he wrote nearly twenty novels. As founder and president of the Association of Writers, he was involved in defending their interests.

He married in 1950 and had two children. He died in Madrid on July 23, 1984.

After his death, Radio Nacional de España broadcast the series, "An Unexpected Visit," with his scripts.

On April 25, 2025, the Instituto Cervantes honored him by depositing a legacy of his work in the Caja de las Letras (Box of Letters).

Since 2019, the Collegiate Association of Writers has convened the Ángel María de Lera Award for the Promotion of the Work of Writers and Reading. It has been awarded by the Municipal Board of Culture of Fuenlabrada (2020), Urueña Villa del Libro-Jorge Guillén Foundation (2021), the Network of Public Libraries of Navarra (2022), the School of Writers (2023), the program of National Radio of Spain "La estación azul" (2024).

== Sources ==
- Armada, Alfonso (24 July 1984), "Ángel María de Lera, el novelista defensor de los escritores, será enterrado hoy en el cementerio civil de Madrid", El País (in Spanish), Madrid
- Guzmán, Eduardo de (1 November 1978), "Medio siglo de sindicalismo español: Ángel Pestaña", Tiempo de Historia (in Spanish), no. 48, pp. 40–47
