= György Szomjas =

Hungarian film director and screenwriter (1940–2021)

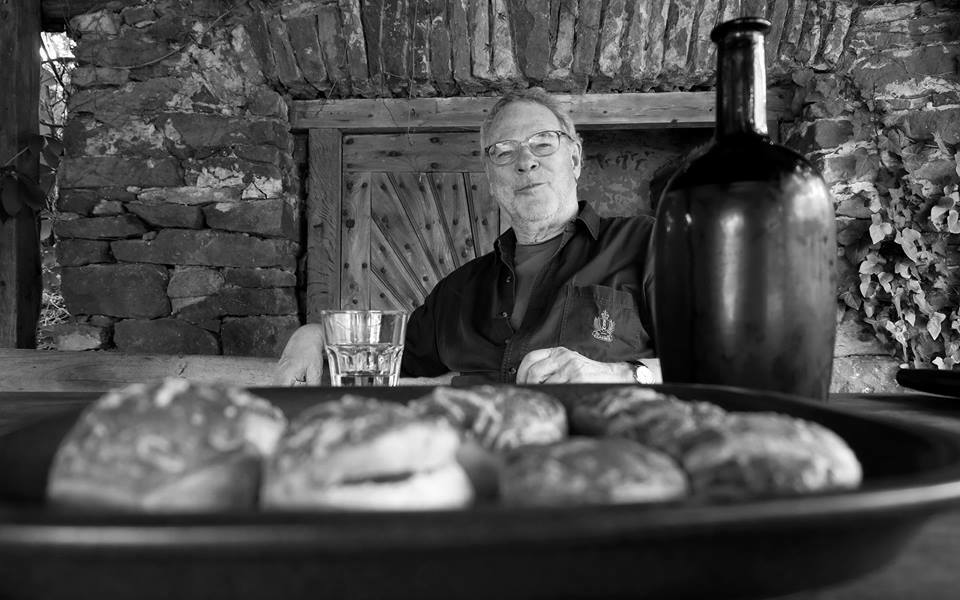
- Born: 26 November 1940; Budapest, Hungary
- Died: 7 April 2021 (aged 80); Hungary
- Occupations: Film director Screenwriter
- Years active: 1965–2021

György Szomjas (26 November 1940 – 7 April 2021) was a Hungarian film director and screenwriter. He directed more than 20 films from 1965 to 2021. His 1983 film Tight Quarters was entered into the 34th Berlin International Film Festival. Szomjas is the father of the Hungarian Ostern, the Goulash Western: in 1970s he directed two osterns about the Hungarian rascals the Wrong Doers and The Wind Blows Under Your Feet.

== Selected filmography ==
- Tight Quarters (1983)
