= Demon in the Blood =

- Spanish: El Demonio en la sangre
- Directed by: René Mugica
- Release date: 1964
- Running time: 102 minute
- Country: Argentina
- Language: Spanish

Demon in the Blood (Spanish: El Demonio en la sangre) is a 1964 Argentine film directed by René Mugica.
