= Miguel López (film editor) =

Argentine film editor

- Occupation: Film editor

Miguel López is an Argentine film editor.

Some of the films he edited have been critically well received, for example: La Noche de los lápices (1986).

== Filmography ==
- Destino de un capricho (1972)
- Los Hombres sólo piensan en eso (1976)
- Sálvese quien pueda (1984)
- Los Reyes del sablazo (1984)
- Pasajeros de una pesadilla (1984) a.k.a. Nightmare's Passengers
- Mirame la palomita (1985)
- La Noche de los lápices (1986) a.k.a. Night of the Pencils
- Rambito y Rambón primera misión (1986)
- Sobredosis (1986)
- Los Colimbas se divierten (1986)
- Galería del terror (1987)
- Los Colimbas al ataque (1987)
- El Profesor Punk (1988)
- Atracción peculiar (1988)
- Delito de corrupción (1991)
- Siempre es difícil volver a casa (1992) a.k.a. It's Always Hard to Return Home
- Adiós, abuelo (1996)
