= Das Autogramm =

1984 film

- Film poster
- Directed by: Peter Lilienthal
- Written by: Peter Lilienthal; Osvaldo Soriano
- Starring: Juan José Mosalini
- Cinematography: Michael Ballhaus
- Edited by: Siegrun Jäger
- Release date: 12 October 1984
- Running time: 92 minutes
- Country: West Germany
- Language: German

Das Autogramm is a 1984 West German drama film directed by Peter Lilienthal. It was entered into the 34th Berlin International Film Festival.

== Cast ==
- Juan José Mosalini as Daniel Galvan, der Sänger
- Ángel Del Villar as Tony Basilio Rocha, der Boxer (as Angel Del Villar)
- Anna Larreta as Ana Gallo, Tochter
- Hanns Zischler as Leutnant Suarez (as Hans Zischler)
- Nikolaus Dutsch as Sanchez, Bahnwärter (as Nicolas Dutsch)
- Georges Géret as Dr. Gallo (as Georges Geret)
- Pierre Bernard Douby as Ignaz Zuckermann 'Mingo'
- Vito Mata as Dicker
- Luís Lucas as Schwarzhaariger (as Luis Lucas)
- Dominique Nato as Sepulveda Marcial
- Agostinho Faleiro as Schiedsrichter
- Asdrubal Pereira as Morales
- Roman Pallares as Sänger
