= Jairo (singer) =

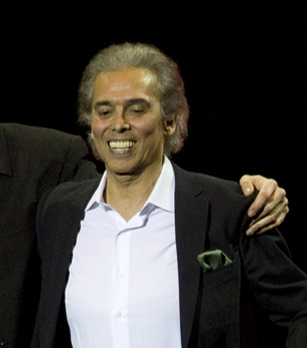
- Jairo in 2011.

Background information
- Born: Mario Rubén González Pierotti; June 16, 1949 (age 77); Córdoba, Argentina
- Genres: Argentine music Folk; Latin ballad Chanson; Tango; Pop rock
- Occupations: Musician, songwriter and producer
- Instruments: Guitar and vocals
- Website: www.jairo.com.ar

Jairo [ˈxajɾo], pseudonym of Mario Rubén González Pierotti (born June 16, 1949), is an Argentine singer-songwriter and composer. Throughout his career, he has performed more than 500 songs in Spanish, French and Italian.

Among its most widespread songs they are: «Tu alma golondrina», «Por si tú quieres saber», «Tristezas», «De pronto sucedió», «El valle y el volcán», «Si vuelves será cansancio», «Amigos míos me enamoré», «Hoy dejó la ciudad», «Nos verán llegar», «Revólver» and «Me encanta esta hora del día».

== Biography ==
Mario Rubén González Pierotti was born in Cruz del Eje, on June 16, 1949. His beginnings as a singer were at school, where the band "The Twisters Boys" joined and finally adopted the name Marito González in game shows media hometown.

In 1970, together with a friend from high school, he distributed a twelve demo songs to different music producers; thus it managed to record a single disc with two songs. The artist Luis Aguilé sent him a job offer, signing a distribution agreement with CBS and moving to Spain.

In 1971 he won first Premio de la Crítica Española and second prize in the Festival of the Costa del Sol. That same year he was hired by the Ariola label. With the establishment of the National Reorganization Process in power, he chose to go into exile in Spain and later in France.

He recorded with Astor Piazzolla in 1981 several songs composed especially for him by Piazzolla himself and the Uruguayan poet Horacio Ferrer, among which stands out «Milonga del trovador» and «Hay una niña en el alba».

Towards the end of the military dictatorship, he returned to Argentina and gave a recital on the Avenida 9 de Julio, where he played to 1.2 million people their version of «We Shall Overcome».

Throughout his career, he shared scenarios both their country and hospitalization stages with artists such as: Ana Belén, Ariel Ramírez, Eladia Blázquez, Graciela Borges, Jaime Torres, Juan Carlos Baglietto, La Mona Jiménez, Lito Vitale, Mercedes Sosa, Pedro Aznar, Piero and Víctor Heredia.

== Discography ==
- 1965: Muy juvenil
- 1970: Emociones
- 1971: Por si tu quieres saber
- 1973: Si vuelves, será cansancio
- 1974: El valle y el volcán
- 1975: Amigos míos, me enamoré
- 1975: Jairo canta a Borges
- 1976: De qué me sirve todo eso
- 1977: Liberté es la nostalgia
- 1977: Guitarra
- 1978: Les plus beaux noel du monde
- 1979: Viva el sol
- 1979: Chansons a regarder
- 1980: Symphonie
- 1980: Jairo
- 1981: Jairo a L’Olimpia
- 1981: Morir enamorado
- 1981: Viviré libre
- 1981: Jairo internacional
- 1981: Mis mejores canciones
- 1982: L’amour au present
- 1982: Todo Jairo
- 1982: Jairo en italiano
- 1982: Este amor es como el viento
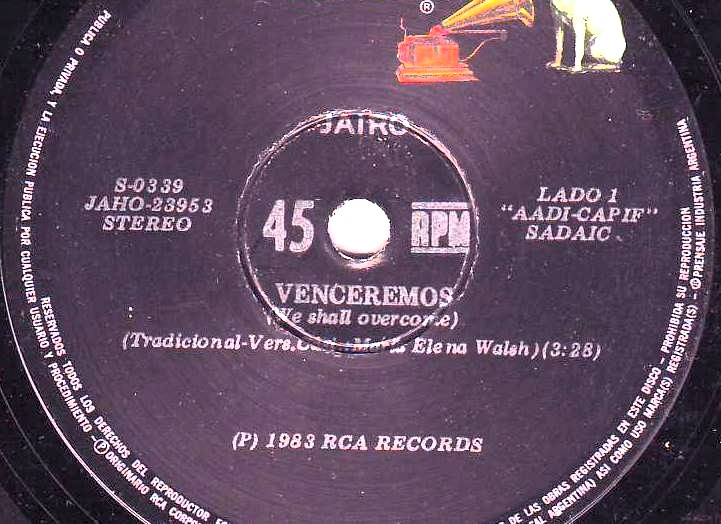
  1983 version by Jairo
- 1983: Serie Oro: Jairo
- 1984: Amor de cada día
- 1984: Le diable
- 1985: Jairo
- 1986: La trace de mes pas
- 1987: Intimidad (varios artistas), canción: «Para verte feliz»
- 1987: Nicaragua
- 1988: Jairo au bataclán
- 1988: Más allá
- 1990: Flechas de neón
- 1990: Revólver
- 1992: Jairo, les plus grands succes
- 1994: Cielos
- 1995: Jairo, 25 años. Volumen I
- 1996: Argentina mía
- 1996: Jairo, 25 años. Volumen II
- 1997: Atahualpa por Jairo
- 1997: Estampitas
- 1998: Borges & Piazzolla
- 1999: La balacera
- 2000: Diario del regreso
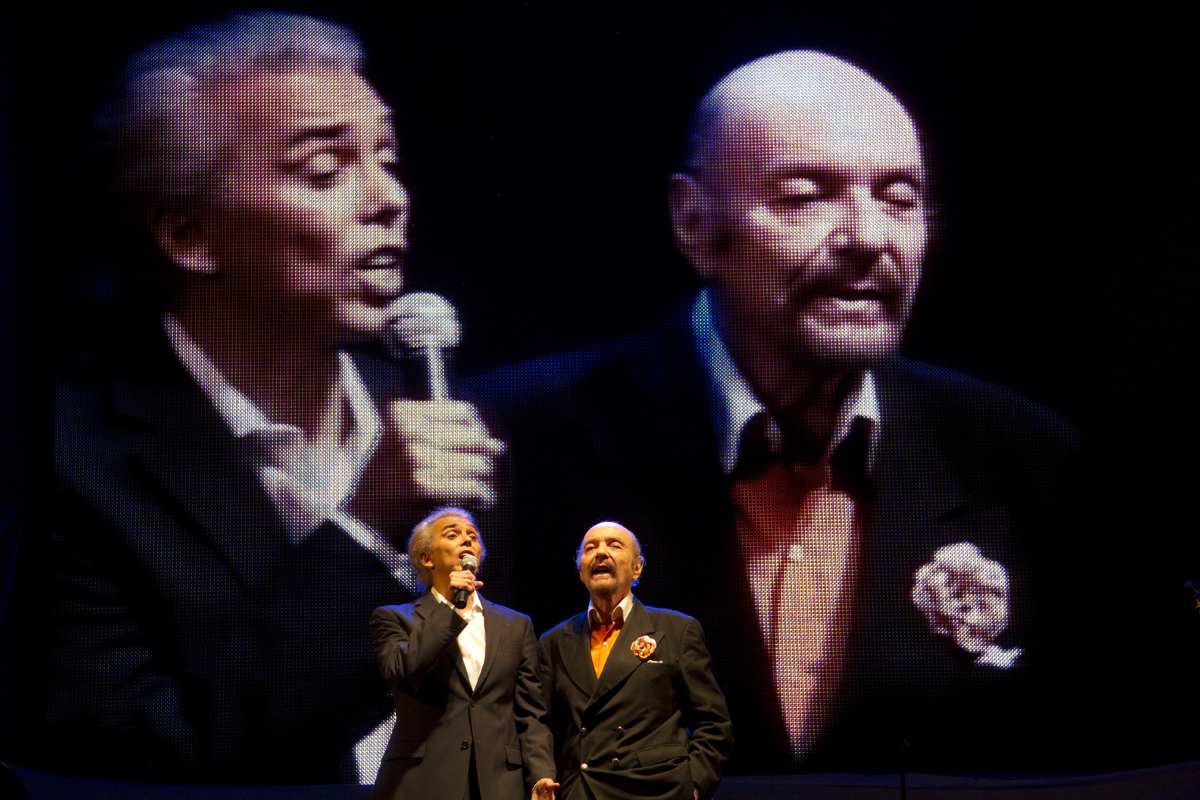
- Jairo with Horacio Ferrer, (2011).
  2001: 24 canciones de oro
- 2001: Puro Jairo
- 2003: Jairo canta a Piazzolla
- 2003: Soy Libre DVD
- 2004: El ferroviario
- 2007: Criollo
- 2009: Los enamorados
- 2011: Concierto en Costa Rica (CD + DVD)
- 2014: Propio y Ajeno
