= Pedro Olea =

Spanish screenwriter, film producer and film director

- Born: 30 June 1938 (age 87); Bilbao, Spain
- Occupations: Film director Screenwriter; Film producer
- Years active: 1970 - present

Pedro Olea (30 June 1938, Bilbao) is a Spanish screenwriter, film producer and film director. His films A House Without Boundaries (1972) and Akelarre (1984) entered into the 22nd and the 34th Berlin International Film Festival. His 1974 film Torment was entered into the 22nd San Sebastián International Film Festival.

In 1993 he won the Goya Award for Best Adapted Screenplay for his period film The Fencing Master.

== Selected directorial filmography ==
- Días de viejo color (1968)
- El bosque del lobo (1971)
- La casa sin fronteras (1972)
- No es bueno que el hombre esté solo (1973)
- Tormento (1974)
- Pim, pam, pum... ¡fuego! (1975)
- Akelarre (1984)
- Bandera negra (1986)
- La Leyenda del cura de Bargota (1990)
- El Día que nací yo (1991)
- El maestro de esgrima (1992)
- Morirás en Chafarinas (1994)
- Más allá del jardín (1996)
- Tiempo de tormenta (2003)
- ¡Hay motivo! (2004)
- La conspiracion (2012)

== Filmography as producer ==
- El bosque del lobo (1971)
- El maestro de esgrima (1992)
- Los novios búlgaros (Bulgarian Lovers) (2002, directed by Eloy de la Iglesia).
- Los managers (2006, directed by Fernando Guillén Cuervo).
