= Funny Dirty Little War =

- DVD cover
- Directed by: Héctor Olivera
- Screenplay by: Héctor Olivera; Roberto Cossa
- Story by: Osvaldo Soriano
- Produced by: Fernando Ayala; Luis O. Repetto
- Starring: Federico Luppi; Miguel Ángel Solá; Ulises Dumont; Lautaro Murúa; Héctor Bidonde; Víctor Laplace; Rodolfo Ranni; Arturo Maly
- Cinematography: Leonardo Rodríguez Solís
- Edited by: Eduardo López
- Music by: Óscar Cardozo Ocampo
- Production company: Aries Cinematográfica
- Distributed by: Cinevista
- Release dates: September 22, 1983 (Argentina); September 9, 1984 (Canada); March 30, 1985 (United States)
- Running time: 80 minutes
- Country: Argentina
- Language: Spanish

Funny Dirty Little War (Spanish: No habrá más penas ni olvido; original title translatable as "There will be no more sorrow or forgetfulness", a line from Mi Buenos Aires Querido tango lyrics) is a 1983 Argentine comedy-drama film directed by Héctor Olivera, written by Olivera and Roberto Cossa, based on a novel of the same name by Osvaldo Soriano. It was produced by Fernando Ayala and Luis O. Repetto, and stars Federico Luppi, Miguel Ángel Solá, Ulises Dumont, Héctor Bidonde and Víctor Laplace.

The film is set during the early 1970s, in central Argentina. A political conflict between the local mayor and the deputy mayor escalates into an armed conflict, with the involvement of both the terrorist organization Argentine Anticommunist Alliance and the guerrilla organization Montoneros.

== Plot ==
During the early 1970s, Ricardo Guglielmini is the mayor of Colonia Vela, a small country village in an undisclosed province of central Argentina. He plots with Héctor Suprino, a local Peronist spin doctor, and Reinaldo, a union leader, to get the town's deputy mayor, Ignacio Fuentes, kicked out of office, due to his increasing popularity, which threatens Guglilemini's decades-long hold on the mayorship.

Fuentes is told that he has to fire his assistant Mateo because of his Marxist sympathies. Fuentes, despite disagreeing with Marxist ideals himself, declines, refusing to be politically strong-armed. Taking advantage of this, Guglilemini publicly accuses Fuentes of aiding communist guerillas as an excuse to fire him or get him to resign.

When Fuentes refuses, Gugliemini sends the police to arrest him, but Fuentes, rather than cave in to the pressure, takes to arms and then barricades himself in the town hall, along with his allies and friends; Mateo, Corporal García, Juan, Rodrigo, Moyito and Crazy Ceres. Guglielmini orders the police to storm the building, which leads to a massive stand-off between the local police force and Fuentes' men. The counter-Fuentes operation, led by Chief Llanos and Sub-Chief Rossi, initially only attempts to threaten Fuentes into surrendering, but soon evolves into a real shootout when members of the Argentine Anticommunist Alliance, led by Rogelio Almeido, show up and intervene. During the shootout with the AAA, Moyito is killed and several police officers are wounded, which leads to a temporary ceasefire and a deadlock. Juan sneaks out through the back to look for the local crop duster pilot, Cerviño, in order to convince him to help Fuentes by conducting an aerial attack as a distraction so he can sneak more ammo and explosives into the building.

As night falls, a group of delusional local Montoneros, led by Matilda Gómez, gather in an abandoned warehouse and make a completely unrealistic and blatantly flawed plan to use the conflict as a means to start a civil war in Argentina, take over the government and convert the country into a communist state. They start out by kidnapping Chief Llanos and holding him for a ransom of several tons of explosives and weaponry. Not wanting to give more resources to the Montoneros, Guglielmini abandons Llanos and declares Rossi the new police chief. Rossi leads a new attack on Fuentes, this time using bulldozers as cover to advance on the town hall. Rodrigo and Crazy Ceres are killed during this attack and Fuentes, García and Mateo are barely saved because Cerviño arrives in the nick of time and sprays pesticides all over the police with his plane, causing them to temporarily disperse.

The Montoneros attack the local union with a pipe bomb, killing Reinaldo, which prompts the AAA agents to abandon the fight against Fuentes and instead attempt to kill the Montoneros. Famed local Radical former senator Prudencio Gúzman attempts to negotiate with the communists for Llanos' release, but the peace talks fall through and Llanos is ultimately executed.

The police regroup and prepare for a third attack. In order to buy some time and distract Rossi, Mateo turns himself in while Fuentes, García and Juan prepare a bomb with the explosives the latter had previously brought in. Regardless of Mateo's surrender, the raid proceeds and, when the police storms the town hall, the bomb goes off, killing several police officers and giving Fuentes, García and Juan enough time to escape through the back. In retaliation, Almeido kills Mateo. Despite managing to escape the town hall, the trio are soon found by the police and Fuentes and García are taken captive. Juan, however, manages to escape. Desperate, he contacts the Montoneros, who promise to help free Fuentes and García if Juan shows them where he keeps his explosives stash. Juan additionally convinces Cerviño to cause one more diversion with his plane.

Juan and the Montoneros, this time led by Matilda Gómez herself, carry out an attack on the school. First, Cerviño uses his plane to drop manure on the police, distracting them long enough to allow Juan and Matilda to sneak into the building. Once inside, they bust García free, but due to AAA reinforcements, they're forced to leave Fuentes behind. The AAA and the Montoneros face off in a massive shootout inside the school, which ends with most people on both sides dead.

Cerviño and his plane are followed by one of the few surviving AAA members, who shoots him when he lands. While fleeing the shootout at the school, Matilda and the other three surviving Montoneros get blown up by Almeido, who finishes them off in a suicide bombing. Suprino tortures Fuentes and then Guglielmini tries to talk him into taking the blame for the whole ordeal. When he refuses, Guglielmini and Suprino leave, letting Rossi execute Fuentes. While leaving town, Suprino realizes Guglielmini plans to frame him for inciting the whole incident, so he runs him over with his truck before escaping.

When morning finally dawns, García and Juan go to Cerviño, where they find him mortally wounded but still alive. To comfort him in his dying moments, they tell him Fuentes won the battle. Cerviño makes them promise to tell General Perón about him if he ever returns to the country, after which he dies. Once they've buried Cerviño, Juan and García begin to head into the countryside while discussing the many ways they could convince Perón to return.

The song "Mi Buenos Aires Querido" is played at the beginning and briefly near the end of the film. "Los muchachos peronistas" plays during the end credits.

== Cast ==
- Federico Luppi as Ignacio Fuentes
- Miguel Ángel Solá as Juan
- Julio de Grazia as Corporal Garcia
- Ulises Dumont as Cerviño
- Lautaro Murúa as Mayor Guglielmini
- Héctor Bidonde as Héctor Suprino
- Rodolfo Ranni as Police Chief Llanos
- Raul Rizzo as Sub-Chief Rossi
- Luis Martínez Rusconi as Rogelio Almeido
- Emilio Vidal as Reinaldo
- Victor Laplace as Prudencio Gúzman
- Alicia Baistrocchi as Matilda Gómez
- José María Lopez as Mateo
- Arturo Maly as Toto
- Graciela Dufau as Mrs. Fuentes
- Patricio Contreras as Police Officer Comini
- Fernando Iglesias as Moyanito
- María Socas as Girl with the JP group
- Salo Pasik as Journalist
- Rodolfo Brindisi as "Crazy" Peláez
- Héctor Olivera as Rebel (cameo)
- Osvaldo Soriano as Rebel (cameo)

== Background ==
The film is based on real political event that took place in Argentina in the mid-1970s. The film depicts, sub silentio, the struggle between the Montoneros political movement and the right-wing Peronist forces.

The Montonero Peronist Movement (Spanish: Movimiento Peronista Montonero) was an Argentine left-wing Peronist guerrilla group, active during the 1970s. Its motto was venceremos ("we will be victorious").

After Juan Perón's return from 20 years of exile and the June 20, 1973 Ezeiza massacre, which marked the definitive split between left and right-wing Peronism, the Montoneros were expelled from the Justicialist party in May 1974 by Perón. The group was almost completely dismantled in 1977, during Jorge Rafael Videla's dictatorship.

== Distribution ==
Funny Dirty Little War first opened in Argentina on September 22, 1983. It has been featured at various film festivals including the Toronto Festival of Festivals; the Berlin International Film Festival; the Cognac Festival du Film Policier, Cognac, France; and the New Directors/New Films Festival in New York City.

== Reception ==
=== Critical response ===
Vincent Canby, writing for The New York Times, complimented the acting, pacing, and Héctor Olivera's directorial style, and wrote, "The film has also been so cannily paced - and is so well acted - that there's never much time to consider larger meanings while the mayhem is going on. Though Funny Dirty Little War ends bleakly, the existence of the film itself - the fact that it could be made at all, and with such style - is ultimately invigorating."

=== Accolades ===
Wins

- Berlin International Film Festival: Confédération Internationale des Cinémas d'Art et Essai Juries (C.I.C.A.E.) Award; International Federation of Film Critics (FIPRESCI) Prize; Silver Berlin Bear, Special Jury Prize; 1984.
- Cognac Festival du Film Policier: Grand Prix; 1985.

Nominated

- Berlin International Film Festival: Golden Berlin Bear; 1984.
