= Osvaldo Soriano =

Argentine journalist and writer

- Born: January 6, 1943; Mar del Plata, Argentina
- Died: January 29, 1997 (aged 54); Buenos Aires, Argentina
- Occupations: Journalist and writer
- Spouse: Catherine
- Children: Manuel Soriano

Grave at Buenos Aires' Chacarita Cemetery

Osvaldo Soriano (January 6, 1943 – January 29, 1997) was an Argentine journalist and writer.

== Biography ==
Soriano was born in Mar del Plata, Argentina. He became a staff writer at La Opinión right from the start in 1971 when editor Jacobo Timerman founded the newspaper. La Opinión was permeated with progressive politics, and soon there was an attempt to squash the left-wing influence within the paper. After six months of not having any of his articles published, Soriano began writing a story in which a character named Osvaldo Soriano reconstructs the life of English actor Stan Laurel.

The work became his first novel, Triste, solitario y final (Sad, lonely and final), a melancholic parody set in Los Angeles with the famed fictional Philip Marlowe detective as his joint investigator. It was some months after the publication of his novel that he visited the American city, and actually stood by the grave of Stan Laurel, leaving there a copy of his book. This book set the tone for many of his other works: the use of true facts as the background of his stories, the contradictory and tortured nature of the main characters, progressive politics as key element of the stories.

Shortly after the Proceso de Reorganización Nacional coup d'état in Argentina in 1976, he was compelled to move tout of fear for his physical safety first to Brussels, (where he met his wife Catherine), and then to Paris, where he lived in exile until 1984. While in France he befriended Julio Cortázar, with whom he founded the short-lived experience of the monthly magazine Sin censura. After the fall of the military junta, he returned to Buenos Aires, and the publication of his books were met with large success, not only in South America but also in Italy and several other countries where his works begun to be translated and published.

In his books, Soriano succeeded in mixing his experiences as a democratic activist and as a strong critic of the violence wielded by reactionary governments with extraordinary humor. A lover of both fútbol (soccer) and cinematography, he often honored both in his work. Soriano was a known San Lorenzo fan, sharing that affiliation with fellow Argentine Pope Francis.

After his death in Buenos Aires in 1997 due to a lung cancer, he was buried in the La Chacarita Cemetery in Buenos Aires. His work has since been translated into at least fifteen different languages, and has inspired film directors and producers on fiction and documentary works based on his novels and life experience.

== Bibliography ==
- Triste, solitario y final (1973)
- No habra más penas ni olvido (1979, in Argentina 1983)
- Cuarteles de invierno (1981, in Argentina 1983)
- Artistas, locos y criminales (1983)
- Funny Dirty Little War (1986), translation of No habra más penas ni olvido by Nick Caistor
- Rebeldes, soñadores y fugitivos (1987)
- A sus plantas rendido un león (1988)
- Winter Quarters (1989), translation of Cuarteles de invierno by Nick Caistor
- Una sombra ya pronto serás (1990)
- El ojo de la patria (1992)
- Cuentos de los años felices (1993)
- Shadows (1993), translation of Una sombra ya pronto serás by Alfred MacAdam
- La hora sin sombra (1995)
- Fútbol (1998), a compilation of football (soccer) short stories
- Soriano: un retrato, Editorial Norma, 2000. By Eduardo Montes-Bradley

== Filmography ==
- El Penalti más largo del mundo (2005)
- Il rigore piu' lungo del mondo (2005), short film directed by Christian Filippella
- Una Sombra ya pronto serás (1994), based upon A Shadow You Soon Will Be
- Cuarteles de invierno (1984), Cuarteles de Invierno, Dir. Héctor Olivera, Aries Cinematográfica, Argentina.
- Das Autogramm (1984), based upon Cuarteles de Invierno, aka L' Autographe, aka The Autograph
- No habrá más penas ni olvido (1983), based upon Funny Dirty Little WarDir. Héctor Olivera, Aries Cinematográfica, Argentina.
- Una Mujer (1975)

=== Documentaries ===
- Montes-Bradley, Eduardo (Director) (1999). Soriano (Feature Documentary). USA: Heritage Film Project.
