= Araitz =

Spanish town

Coordinates: 43°02′13″N 1°59′14″W

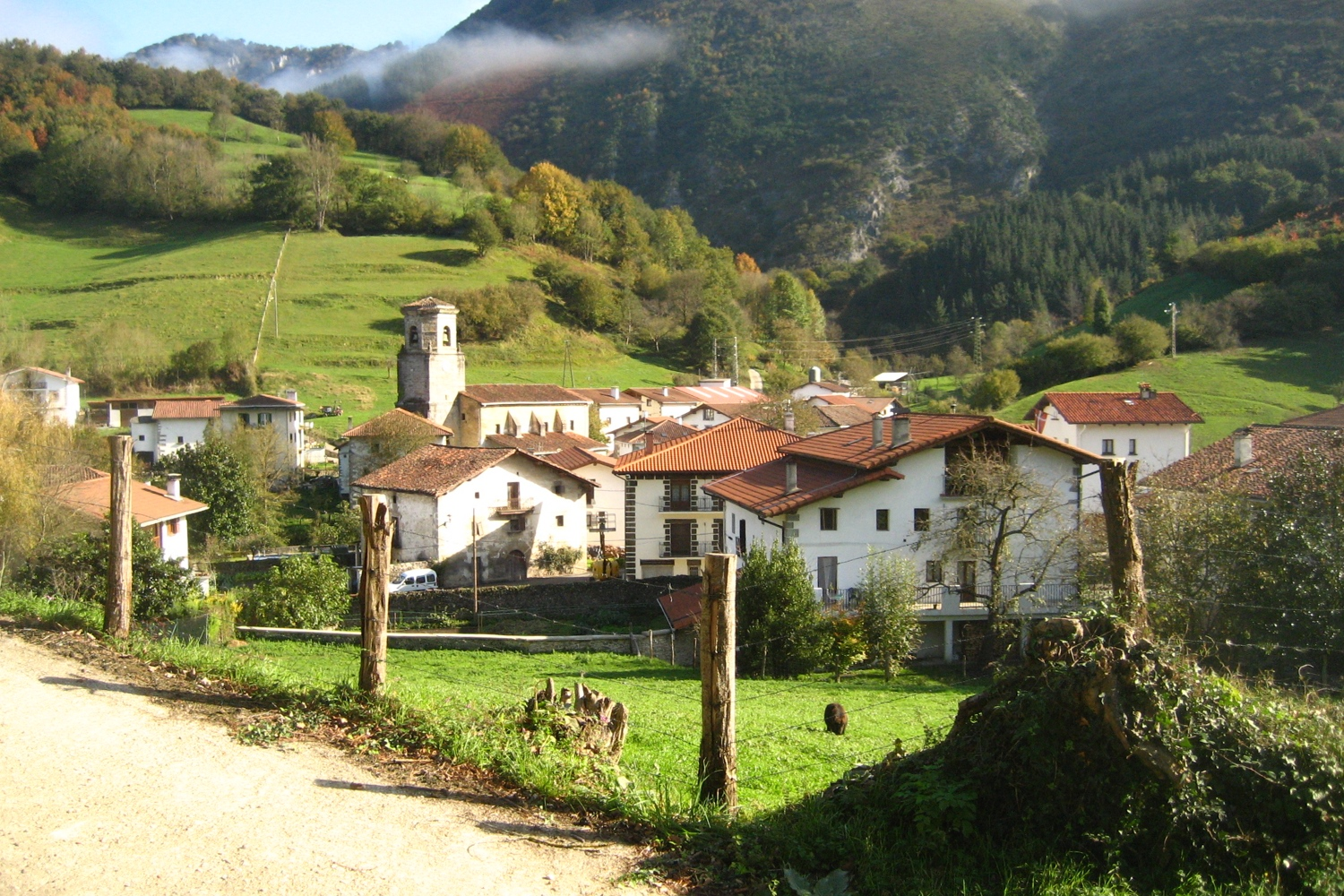
Araitz, a town in the Arribe Araitz valley

Araitz's coat of arms

Araitz is a town and municipality located in the province and autonomous community of Navarre, northern Spain.
