= William Layton (actor) =

American actor and dramatist (1914–1995)

William Layton (December 23, 1914, Kansas City, Missouri – June 15, 1995) was an American playwright and actor. He trained under Sanford Meisner and subsequently.

== Education and early career ==
Layton trained as an actor at the American Academy of Dramatic Arts. He became interested in European theater on a trip to London with his friend, Thornton Wilder. On his return to the United States, Layton joined the American Theatre Wing in New York. It was at the Neighbourhood Playhouse in New York, where he met his mentor, Sanford Meisner.

== Hearing loss and death ==
Layton returned from the Second World War with hearing loss which accompanied him throughout his life. It seemed to Layton that his old age was preventing him from the normality of everyday activities and he took his life at the age of 81 in Madrid.

== Awards and accolades ==
- Best Director of the Year (1979)
- Daedalus Award 1990 (Daily 16)
- Gold Medal for Merit in Fine Arts in 1989.
