= Man on Pink Corner (film) =

- Photograph of a scene from the Argentine film Man on Pink Corner
- Spanish: Hombre de la Esquina Rosada
- Directed by: René Múgica
- Release date: 1962
- Running time: 70 minute
- Country: Argentina
- Language: Spanish

Man on Pink Corner (Spanish: Hombre de la Esquina Rosada) is a 1962 Argentine film directed by René Múgica, based on the story by Jorge Luis Borges. It was shown at the Cannes and San Sebastián film festivals.

Borges viewed the film favourably, commenting "he did a good job with the possibilities provided by the plot".

In a survey of the 100 greatest films of Argentine cinema carried out by the Museo del Cine Pablo Ducrós Hicken in 2000, the film reached the 17th position. In a new version of the survey organized in 2022 by the specialized magazines La vida útil, Taipei and La tierra quema, presented at the Mar del Plata International Film Festival, the film reached the 48th position.

== Cast ==
- Francisco Petrone - Francisco Real, "El Corralero"
- Walter Vidarte - El Oriental
- Susana Campos - La Lujanera
- Jacinto Herrera - Rosendo Juárez, "El Pegador"
- Berta Ortegosa - Julia
- Jorge de la Riestra - Eleodoro, "El Turco"
- María Esther Podestá - Casera de la pensión
- María Esther Buschiazzo - Madre de Nicolás Fuentes
- Mario Savino - Cosme
- Juan Carlos Galván - Juan
- Ricardo Argemí - Don Carmelo
- Alberto Barcel - Comisario
- Isidro Fernán Valdez - Tío de Nicolás Fuentes
- Adolfo Linvel - Nicanor
- Tino Pascali - Intendente
- Andrés Rivero - Padre de Nicolás Fuentes
- Claudio Lucero - Agente Medina
- Manuel Rosón - Ramón Santoro
- Susana Brunetti - Mujer en pulpería
- Zulma Grey - Prostituta
- Aída Villadeamigo - Florista
- Mercedes Escribano - Vieja
- Rafael Chumbita
- Délfor Medina - Comisario 2
- Rafael Diserio - Carrero
- Ovidio Fuentes - Puestero
- Héctor Fuentes - Muchacho en pulpería
- Reina del Carmen
- Mariel Comber - Mujer en pulpería
