= Eduardo López (film editor) =

Argentine film editor

- Occupation: Film editor

Eduardo López is an Argentine film editor and documentary film director.

Some of the films he has edited have been critically well received: Funny Dirty Little War.

== Selected filmography ==
- Tiempo de Revancha (1981)
- The Deal (1983)
- No habrá más penas ni olvido (1983) aka Funny Dirty Little War
- Cocaine Wars (1985) La Muerte blanca
- The Year of The Rabbit (1987)
- Peculiar Attraction (1988)
- A Place in the World (1992)
- Adiós, abuelo (1996)
- Harto The Borges
