= René Mugica =

Argentine actor

- Born: 8 August 1909; Buenos Aires, Argentina
- Died: 3 May 1998 (aged 88); Buenos Aires, Argentina
- Occupations: Actor, film director, screenwriter
- Years active: 1940–1971

René Mugica (8 August 1909 – 3 May 1998) was an Argentine actor, film director and screenwriter. He appeared in 13 films between 1940 and 1953. He also directed ten films between 1961 and 1971.

== Selected filmography ==
=== Actor ===
- The Gaucho Priest (1941)
- La Guerra Gaucha (1942)
- El Fin de la noche (1944)
- His Best Student (1944)
- The Corpse Breaks a Date (1944)
- Savage Pampas (1945)
- Where Words Fail (1946)

=== Director ===
- That Forward Center Died at Dawn (El centroforward murió al amanecer) – 1961
- Man on Pink Corner (Hombre de la Esquina Rosada) – 1962
- Rata de puerto – 1963
- La Murga – 1963
- Demon in the Blood (El demonio en la sangre) – 1964
- El octavo infierno – 1964
- The Amphitheatre (El Reñidero) – 1965
- Viaje de una noche de verano – 1965
- La buena vida – 1966
- Bajo el signo de la patria – 1971
