= Juan Alberto Montes =

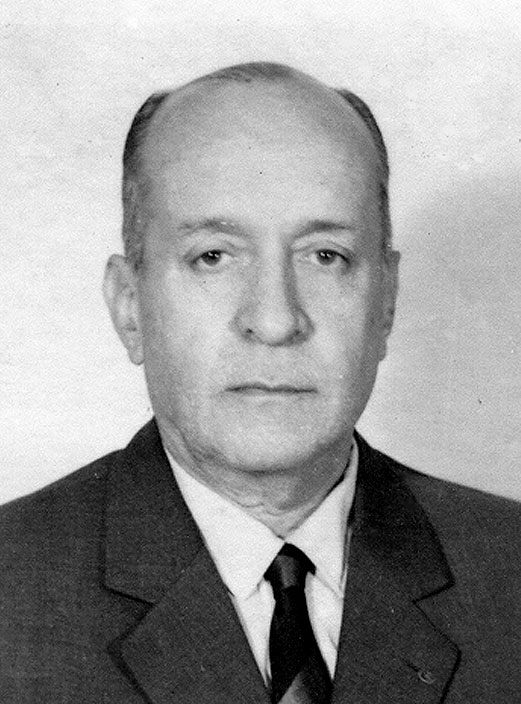
- Portrait
- Born: December 12, 1902; Argentina
- Died: June 30, 1986 (aged 83); Rosario, Santa Fe
- Occupations: Surveyor, writer, historian
- Spouse: Ana María
- Children: Roald, Leicy
- Relatives: Ricardo Ernesto Montes i Bradley, Eduardo Bradley, Eduardo Montes-Bradley, Nelson Montes-Bradley

Juan Alberto Donato Montes Bradley (December 12, 1902 – June 30, 1986) was Surveyor, Historian and Trustee of the Historical Society of Rosario, author of numerous articles and essays.

He was born in Buenos Aires, Argentina. As Technical Advisor to the Comisión Nacional del Río Dulce, Montes oversaw tech-specs pertaining to the mega project for hydroelectric power development in Santiago del Estero, Argentina. Juan A. Montes was also involved -from 1948 until 1956- in planning the Ciudad Universitaria a modern campus-complex for the Universidad Nacional del Litoral in Rosario and several improvements compiled under a single work-project known as Plan Rosario. In 1973 Juan A. Montes was appointed by Rector to the Universidad Tecnológica Nacional (UTN) by Héctor José Cámpora, then president of Argentina.

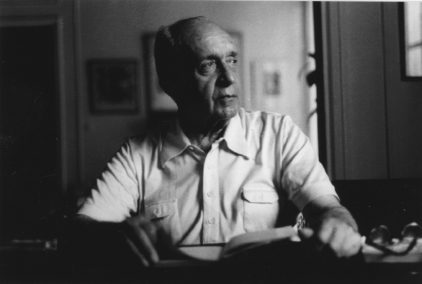
Juan A. Montes, 1984

At the time Montes was closely affiliated to the left wing of the Peronist known as Montoneros. His son, Roald, a member of Montoneros, was killed in action next to other members of the group in La Plata on (November, 1976). Juan A. Montes remained as Rector of the UTN throughout the third presidential period of Juan Domingo Perón. The events of November 1976 forced Montes into self-imposed exile in Rosario where he became involved in the research of the facts leading to the founding of the City Rosario, the results were later published under the title: Santiago Montenegro, fundador de la Ciudad de Rosario Juan Alberto Montes died in Rosario, Santa Fe, on June 30, 1986. The School of Urbanism's Library at the Universidad de Rosario was named Alberto D. Montes in his memory. On December 17, 1997, the City of Rosario ordered to rename a street after Mr. Montes. The avenue is known as "Avenida Agrimensor Alberto D. Montes".

== Bibliography ==
- Santiago Montenegro. Fundador de la ciudad de Rosario. Ediciones IEN, 1977. 164 pages, photographs, maps and genealogical tree and graphs.
- Plan Rosario. Ley Nacional N°16.052 y sus antecedentes. Proyecto de Decreto reglamentario. Publish by CEN, Centro de Estudios Nacionales, Provinciales y Municipales, Rosario, Argentina. Rosario, 77 pages, photographs, maps and graphs.
- Rotary, los problemas urbanos y la agrimensura. Publish by Rotary Club, 1941. 16 pages, maps.
- "El omnibus en Rosario" Revista de Historia de Rosario. Año XVII Nr. 31, 1979.

== Other sources ==
- “Legado” a short documentary (15 min) filmed in 8mm by Nelson Montes-Bradley. In “Legado” Montes narrates unknown passages of his childhood, express his political views, talks about his wife and his son Roald Montes who just a few years before the filming took place had been killed by government forces in what later came to be known as "La battalla de La Plata”; The film was entirely shot at Mr. Montes home in Rosario
