= Pehuajó Partido =

Pehuajó Partido de Pehuajó
- Department
- location of Pehuajó in Buenos Aires Province
- Coordinates: 35°48′S 61°52′W
- Country: Argentina
- Established: 1889
- Founder: Dardo Rocha
- Seat: Pehuajó

Government
  - Intendant: Pablo Zurro (PJ)

Area
  - Total: 4,531 km^{2} (1,749 sq mi)

Population
  - Total: 38,400
  - Density: 8.47/km^{2} (22.0/sq mi)
- Demonym: pehuajense
- Postal Code: B6450
- IFAM: BUE092
- Area Code: 02396
- Patron saint: San Anselmo
- Website: www.pehuajo.gov.ar

Pehuajó Partido (Spanish pronunciation: [pewa'xo]) is a partido in the northeast of Buenos Aires Province in Argentina.

The provincial subdivision has a population of about 40,000 inhabitants in an area of 4,531 km^{2} (1,749 sq mi), and its capital city is Pehuajó, which is around 389 km (242 mi) from Buenos Aires.

== Settlements ==
- Abel
- Alagón
- Albariño
- Ancón
- Asturias
- Capitán Castro
- El Recado
- Francisco Madero
- Girondo
- Gnecco
- Inocencio Sosa
- Juan José Paso
- La Cotorra
- Larramendy
- Las Juanitas
- Magdala
- Mones Cazón
- Nueva Plata
- Pedro Gamen
- Pehuajó
- San Bernardo de Pehuajó
- San Esteban
