= Ricardo Ernesto Montes i Bradley =

Argentine writer, diplomat (1905–1976)

R-E Montes i Bradley
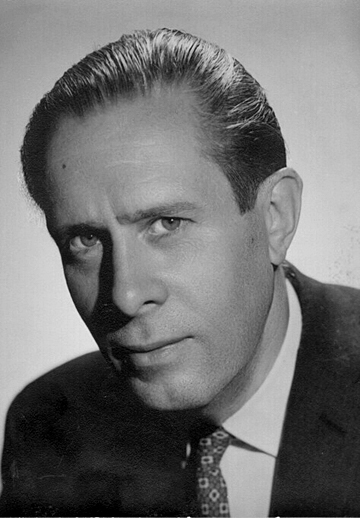
- Head Shot, c.1952
- Born: June 9, 1905; Rosario, Argentina
- Died: November 22, 1976 (aged 71); Buenos Aires, Argentina
- Spouse: Virginia Picot
- Children: Rodolfo Montes i Picot
- Relatives: Eduardo Montes-Bradley, Eduardo Bradley Juan Alberto Montes

Ricardo Ernesto Montes i Bradley was a poet, essayist, art historian, and literary critic and diplomat. He born on June 9, 1905, in Rosario, Argentina. He was Honorary Consul of México in Rosario, professor of Fine Arts, publisher, columnist and contributor in newspapers and literary magazines in Latin America. R-E Montes i Bradley held Doctorates in the Law, Diplomacy, History and International Law. He was an active member of the International Institute of Ibero-American Literature and the International Association of Critics; Correspondent Member of the National Academy of Arts and Literature of Cuba and of the National Academy of History and Geography of Mexico; Honorary Member of the Mexican Academy of Genealogy and Heraldry (Academia Mexicana de Genealogía y Heráldica); member of the Sociedad Argentina de Escritores (SADE); a member of the Círculo de la Prensa and the Colegio de Abogados de la Ciudad de Rosario; co-founded the Escuela de Bellas Artes de Rosario; member of the Asociación de Críticos de México. As publisher, he was responsible for the Boletín de Cultura Intelectual, which he also directed; the art magazines Revista Paraná and Cuadernos del Litoral were also the result of his commitment to journalism in the arts. The last two publications were dedicated to promote the works of local artist, writers, poets in the region known as Paraná, Rosario de Santa Fe and vicinity.

In 1951, Montes i Bradley moved to Mexico City. In 1964, he was designated Envoy Extraordinary and Minister Plenipotentiary to the Embassy of Argentina in México. Montes i Bradley returned to Argentina in 1973. He died in Buenos Aires on November 22, 1976.

== Printed works ==
=== Bibliography ===
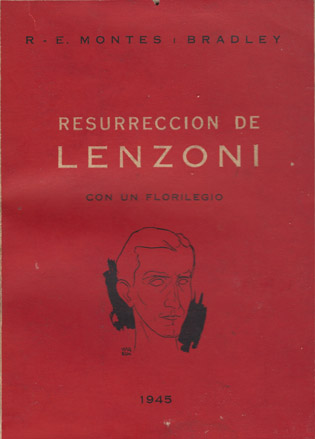
Editorial Palace. Rosario

- Alabado Sea Tu Nombre, (Prise Be Thy Name) Carpetas 1 del Grillo, Rosario, 1944. A unique collection of poems. With to engravings by Juan Berlingieri. The author is listed on the front cover as R-E. Montes i Bradley. This unique publication is registered with the Fine Arts Museum "Juan B. Castagnino" in Rosario, Santa Fe, Argentina. Each of the 90 copies is either initialed or signed by the author. The author prizes his wife Virginia Picot-Bonoris in the title.
- Resurrección de Lenzoni, (The resurrection of Lenzoni). Editorial Palace, Rosario, 1945. Biographical work on Marcos Lenzoni. With florilegio and two etchings by Ricardo Warecki and Azubi Borda. Dedicated to his brother Saul. 130 pages. Index and Colofon.

Cover Page with dedication by the author

- El Agricultor José de San Martín, (The Farmer). Foreword by Vicente Saenz. Dedicated to the author's parents. Editorial Perspectivas, Mexico, 1952. Partial biography of José de San Martín. Soft Cover and Hard Cover editions were published in the same year and 145 pages. Index and Colofón. Hard Cover, 3000 copies, Sof Cover, 3000 copies.
- El Camino de Manuel Musto, (The Path of Manuel Musto). Hipocampo, Rosario, 1942. Foreword by Juan Filloy. Biographical work on Manuel Musto. Printed on June 30, 1942. 700 copies, rustic. Printer: Emilio Fenner, Rosario, Santa Fe, Argentina. 190 pages. List of Illustrations, Index, Colofon.
- Himno al Arte. R-E Montes i Bradley and Nicolas Mastroiacovo. Casa Romano, Rosario, Santa Fe, 1942.
- El retrato de mi madre. Cinco diseños a la pluma. Cuatro telas al óleo y una escultura de bronce de César Augusto Caggiano. Con Estudio crítico por Ricardo Ernesto Montes i Bradley, catedrático de estilos en el profesorado de estética anexo a la Escuela Normal Nacional “Juan María Gutierrez” y de Historia del Arte en la escuela de Artes Plásticas de Rosario. Editorial Atenea, 1942. Format 27 x 37cm. Encuadernada en tela con sobrecubierta.
- El Estampero Argentino de Hoy. Ediciones Conferencia, Mexico 1957. Dedicated to "Virginia Picot, esposa y amiga”. This is a critical essay on a singular show of Argentine engravers artists in México. Foreword by Paul Westheim. Notes by Alfonso Reyes. Pages 62. 32 Prints in Black and white.
- Las lacas y los dibujos de Carlos Valdés Mujica. Written in collaboration with José León Pagano. The book comprises articles and essays by Juan Filloy, José León Pagano, Marcelo Menaché, Andrés Sabella, Fernán Félix de Amador, Santiago José Chierico, Luis Gudiño Kramer, Antonio J. Bucich, José González Carbalho, Manuel Mujica Láinez, Federico Monjardin, Edmundo Blanco Boer, Juan Sol, Pedro Badanelli, Anselmo Ballesteros, Sonia Dimitrowna, Rafael Serrano Vivanco, Rafael B. Esteban, Luis A. Paganotto, Santiago Bernardi, Miguel Flor de Lis, Dante Mantovani and others. (Editorial Atenea, Rosario, 1948)

=== Publications ===
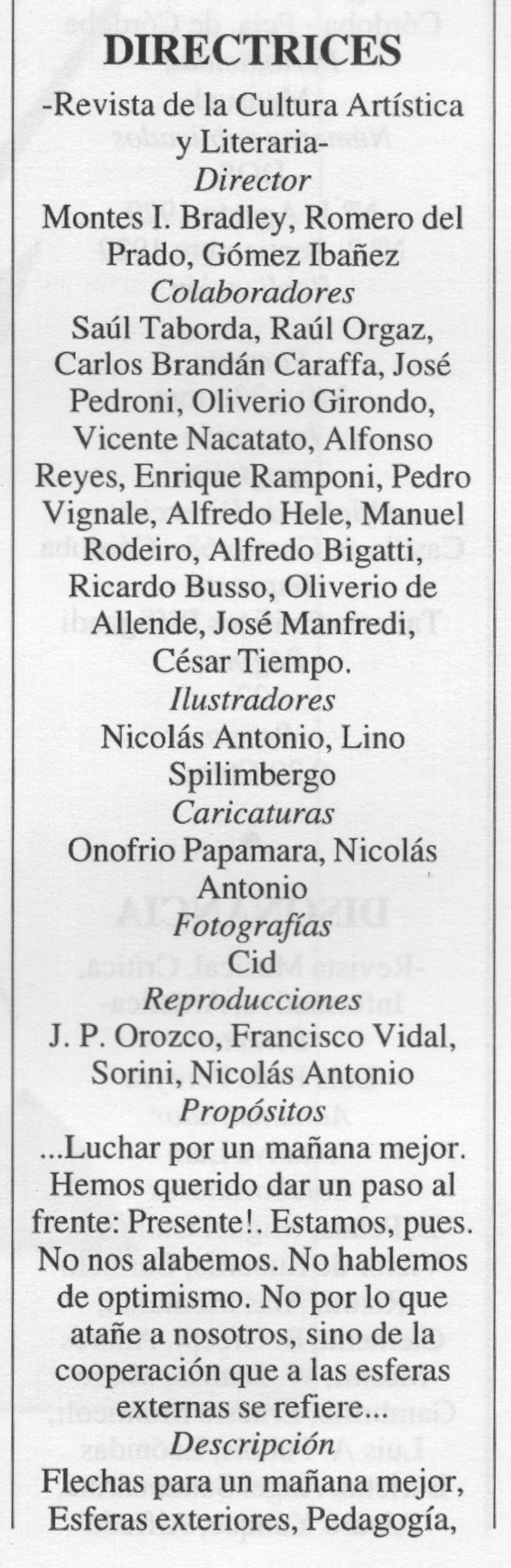
Revista Directrices, Staff Writers

* Directrices, “Revista de la Cultura Artística y Literaria”. Córdoba. Co-directed with Romero del Prado y Gómez Ibañes. Staff writers Saúl Taborda, Raúl Orgaz, Carlos Brandán Garafa, José Pedroni, Oliverio Girondo, Alfonso Reyes, Vicente Nacatato, Enrique Ramponi, Pedro Vignale, Alfredo Hele, Manuel Rodeiro, Alfredo Bigatti, Ricardo Busso, Oliverio de Allende, José Manfredi, César Tiempo. Illustrations by Nicolás Antonio and Lino Spilimbergo. Only two issues were ever published, in August and September 1929. Format: 310 X 330 mm. Pages 32. A disclosure of principles followed the staff and publishers data: "...Lcuhar por un mañana mejor. Hemos querido dar un paso al frente: Presente!. Estamos, pues. No nos alabemos. No hablemos de optimismo. No por lo que atañe a nosotros, sino de la cooperación que a las esferas extremas se refiere... | Ideología: De Izquierda"

- Revista Paraná Paraná may be considered the founder of cultural relations between the cities of Rosario and Santa Fe as a cultural phenomenon in the region of Paraná. The magazine was published between 1941 and 1943 by Ricardo Ernesto Montes i Bradley. The magazine found a place to express and disseminate works of Mateo Booz, Busaniche Jose, Olga Cosettini Elias Diaz Molano, Juan Filloy, Arturo Fruttero, Lucio Fontana, Leonidas Gambartes, Alcides Greca, Luis Gudiño Kramer, José Pedroni, Irma Peirano, Julio Vanzo, and Wernicke Rosa Agustin Zapata and others.
- Boletín de Cultura Intellectual Published between June 1938 and January–September 1944.

=== Journalistic works ===
Journalistic activity by Montes i Bradley can be summarized in his contribution to Spanish language newspapers in Argentina before his exile in Mexico from 1951 until 1973 and during a brief period in his return to Buenos Aires in 1973 and until he died in 1976. The media in which he has worked are: Diario La Nación, Buenos Aires, Diario La Capital, Rosario, Boletín de Cultura Intellectual, Rosario, Paraná, Rosario, Diario Excelsior, Mexico, Diario El Nacional, Mexico, Revista Novedades, Mexico, Revista Siempre, México, Revista Hoy, México.

==== Essays of relevance ====
- La respuesta. In memory of Antonio Machado. El Nacional, Issue 500. México. 1956.
- El taller de gráfica popular y su proyección continental.
- Nuevo y valioso aporte al conocimiento de Posada, Novedades. Mexico. D.F. May 4. 1952. The essay is an introduction to a publication containing 134 engravings by José Guadalupe Posada.
- Las judas de México. Mexican Folkways. Issue 2. México, 1925.
