= Filloy =

Filloy is a surname. Notable people with the surname include:

- Ariel Filloy (born 1987), Argentine-Italian basketball player
- Juan Filloy (1894–2000), Argentine writer
