= Pedro Zanni =

Argentinian pilot

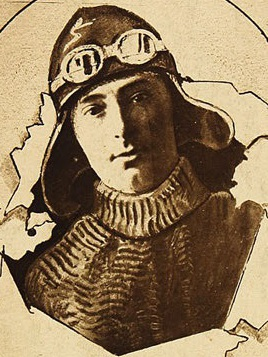
A Painting of Pedro Leandro Zanni

Pedro Leandro Zanni (12 March 1891, Pehuajó – 29 January 1942, Campo de Mayo) was a pioneering Argentinian pilot of the early 20th century who made the then longest west-to-east flight in a non-amphibious aircraft in his circumnavigation attempt of 1924.

== Early life ==
Zanni was the son of Italian immigrants Pedro Zanni and Dominga Senini.

On 10 October 1906, Zanni entered the Colegio Militar de la Nación (national military college), graduating 2nd Lieutenant on 2 August 1909. In 1913, he was assigned to the 2nd Mounted Artillery Regiment based in Campo de Mayo, Buenos Aires.

On 28 March the same year, he received pilot's licence no. 17 issued by the Aero Club Argentino. He soon had an accident when his Castaibert IV monoplane fell from a height of 40 metres at El Palomar, Buenos Aires. He suffered only minor injuries. Zanni began his conversion to the Nieuport IV and Breguet airplanes and, on 27 November 1913, obtained military aviator's licence no. 4 in the first class of army aviators, an achievement he shared with 1st Lt Raúl Eugenio Goubat and engineers Jorge Newbery and Alberto Roque Mascías.

== Aviation career ==
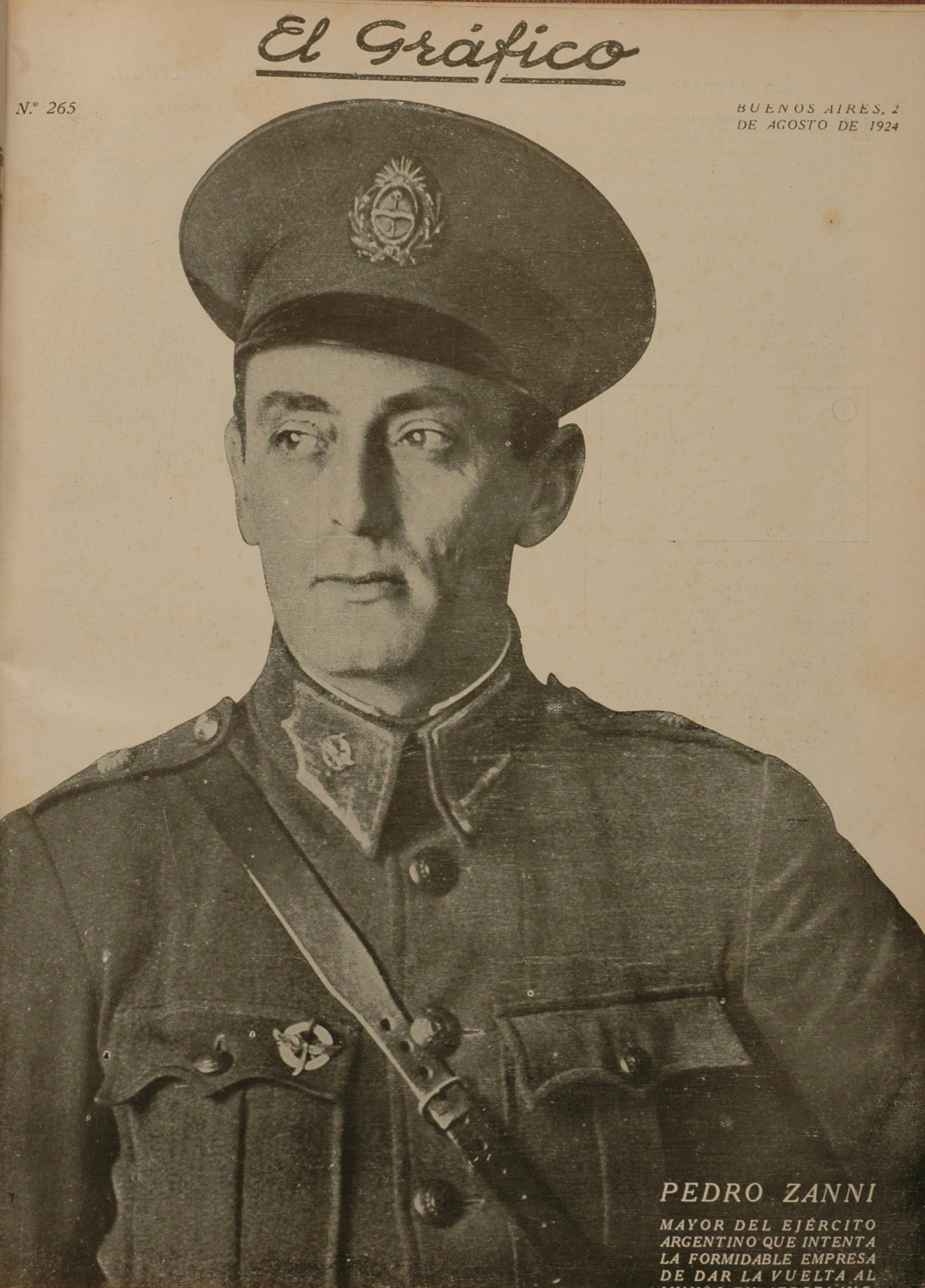
Pedro Zanni in 1924

In a Nieuport IV, Zanni took the South American aviation record for distance and speed on 20 July 1914 by connecting El Palomar and Villa Mercedes, San Luis Province, and the next day set a new South American speed record while travelling the 363 kilometres from Pehuajó to El Palomar in 2 hours 10 minutes at an average speed of 163 km per hour. He set a height record of 4000 metres in a Morane-Saulnier monoplane on a flight from El Palomar on 3 November 1915.

Zanni attempted a crossing of the Andes mountain range in a Morane-Saulnier monoplane on 13 February 1917 but engine failure forced an emergency landing at Punta de Vacas in which the plane was destroyed.

In February 1919, Zanni performed the first official aerial transport of correspondence in Argentina, linking El Palomar and Camet, near Mar del Plata. His aeroplane was a Nieuport 28 C1 biplane, registration no. N6339. The same year, he test flew a Blériot SPAD S.VII and made a non-stop round-trip between El Palomar and Junín in an Ansaldo SVA.10 biplane.

A gold aviator's award was made to Zanni for a double Andes crossing in 1920. On 2 March, he had crossed from El Palomar to Mendoza. Fourteen days later, he took off from Los Tamarindos in an Ansaldo SVA.5 biplane, No. 1, made Santiago, Chile, and returned over the Andes to Los Tamarindos.

== Attempted circumnavigation ==
On 7 December 1922, Zanni asked the Aero Club Argentino to sponsor him in a project to travel around the world in an airplane, for which the Pro-World Tour Commission was established, presided over by Baron Antonio de Marchi, who organized a public collection for the purpose of acquiring an aircraft, spare parts, maps, etc. The considerable sum of 17,800 pounds sterling was raised for the venture.

The attempt began on 26 July 1924 in Amsterdam in a Fokker C-IV biplane named Ciudad de Buenos Aires. He and mechanic Felipe Beltrame were reported stopping for four hours in Baghdad on 1 August. Their flight was interrupted in Hanoi when their aeroplane was destroyed on take-off on 18 August. They resumed in a replacement of the same type, but fitted with floats, and renamed Provincia de Buenos Aires, which was recorded landing on Hong Kong Harbour on 22 September.

Zanni flew on, via Fuzhou and Shanghai, to Lake Kasumigaura, Tokyo, arriving on 11 October 1924. He and Beltrame abandoned the idea of circumnavigation, however, when deterred by weather conditions over the Pacific. In the end, Zanni was the first to fly from Amsterdam to Tokyo, in a flight time of 119 hours 50 minutes, covering a record-breaking 17,015 kilometres. The first successful aerial circumnavigation, east-to-west, had been completed 13 days earlier by an American team; a British team in an amphibious aircraft had abandoned their attempt on 4 August having travelled further than Zanni.

On 5 June 1929, Zanni commanded a squadron of Breguet XIX-A2 biplanes that explored the area of El Nevado after violent earthquakes there.

== Later life and honours ==
On 28 March 1935, then Lt Col. Zanni was decorated by France with the Legion of Honour.

In 1941, he was appointed Commander of Active Anti-Aircraft Defence and, from 8 October 1941 to 29 January 1942, he served as Commander of Army Aviation, succeeding Division General Ángel María Zuloaga.

On 29 January 1942, Zanni had a traffic accident in the town of Bella Vista that caused injuries causing his death at the Military Hospital of Campo de Mayo the same day.

Zanni is honoured by streets named after him in Ituzaingó, La Tablada, El Palomar, Manuel Alberti and Paraná, among other localities, provinces and municipalities. There are also schools bearing his name in the Province of Buenos Aires.

Zanni was featured on a Republic of Argentina 20 pesos postage stamp in 1967.
