= Eduardo Newbery =

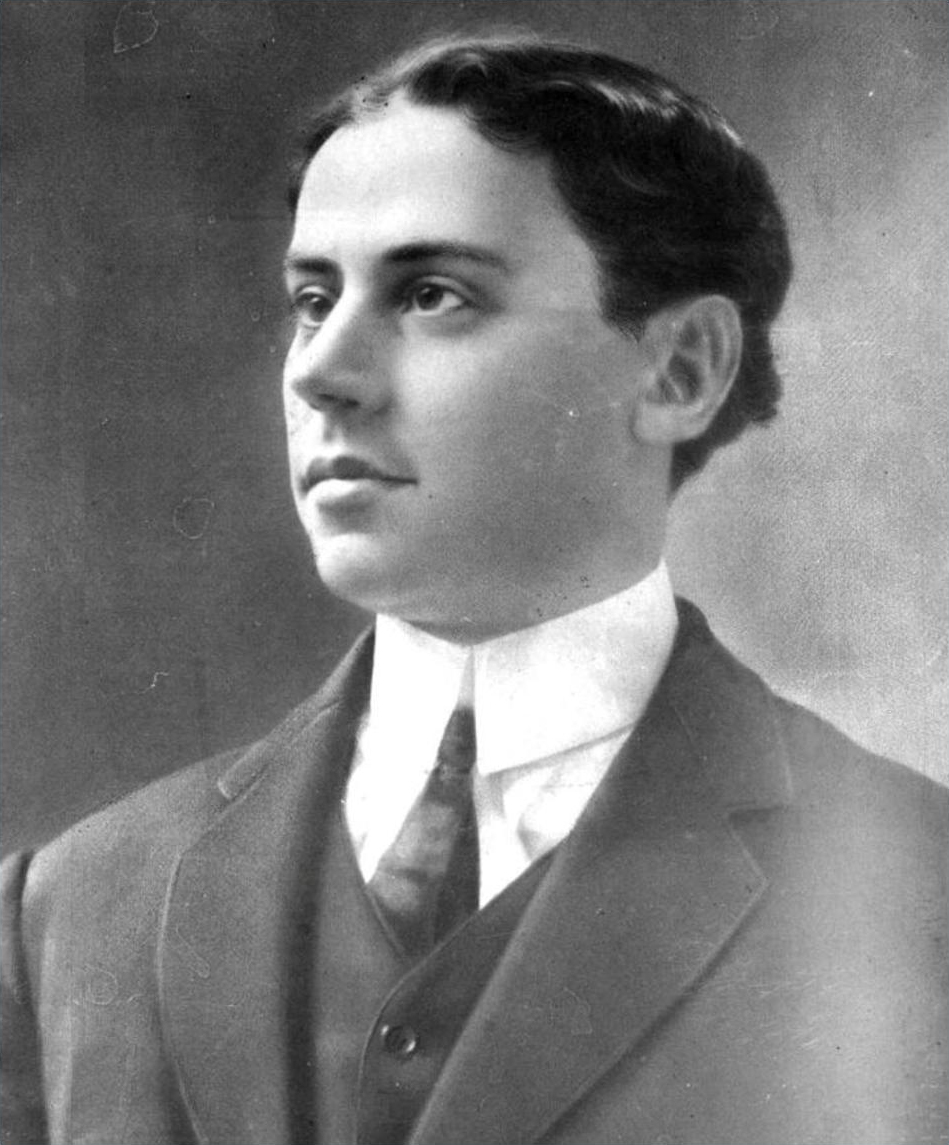
- Born: Eduardo Federico Newbery; February 17, 1878; Argentina
- Disappeared: October 17, 1908 (aged 30)
- Status: Missing for 117 years, 10 months and 12 days
- Died: Unknown
- Father: Ralph Newbery

Eduardo Federico Newbery (February 17, 1878 in Buenos Aires – October 17, 1908 in Río de la Plata) was an Argentine odontologist and aerostat pilot.

== Family life ==
Eduardo Newbery was of American descent to a family of British origin. His father, Ralph Lamartine Newbery Purcell, emigrated from Long Island, New York, and settled in Argentina after the American Civil War, in which he fought on the Union side in the Battle of Gettysburg and was recognized for his courage. Eduardo was one of aviation pioneer Jorge Newbery's siblings (the others were Ernesto Purcell, Elena Rosa, Rodolfo León and María de los Dolores (twins), Elvira Teresa, Emma Catalina, Carlos Alfredo, Luis Alfredo, Juan Alberto Martín and Ana Eva).

Eduardo Newbery took several flights across Argentina. He was admired by many, becoming a celebrity in his own time. Newbery's mother disapproved of his passion, always fearing the worst. His brother Jorge, however, was arguably his number one fan, and felt great respect and admiration for Eduardo.

== Disappearance ==
On October 17, 1908, Eduardo Newbery took off in the aerostat Pampero with Argentine Army Corporal Eduardo Romero, who accepted a last-minute invitation by Newbery. The flight was to take them northbound from Buenos Aires in an attempt to achieve a night-flying record. Neither the aerostat nor its pilot or companion were ever found. Eduardo Newbery and Eduardo Romero were the first Argentines ever to perish in an aircraft accident.

== Aftermath ==
In 1916, the Aero Club Argentino named a second aerostat in honor of Eduardo Newbery. That balloon would become the first ever to cross the Andean mountains at an altitude of 8.100 meters with Eduardo Bradley being its pilot. Bradley also manned the aircraft during several air competitions in Argentina, establishing new records of distance, endurance and altitude.

== See also ==
- List of people who disappeared mysteriously (pre-1910)
