= Manuel Musto =

Argentine impressionist painter

Manuel Musto (born September 16, 1893) was an Argentine impressionist painter. He was born in Rosario.

In 1914 Musto traveled to Florence, Italy. He returned to Argentina after hearing of his father's death. His style was influenced by the Italian school of the 19th century, including bucolic scenes of the countryside and flowers. The bulk of his work is part of the permanent collection of the Museum of Fine Arts in Rosario. The house where he resided is home to the art school that honors his legacy and name.

Musto died at age 47 on September 12, 1940.

== Bibliography ==
- El Camino de Manuel Musto Hipocampo, Rosario, 1942, by Ricardo Ernesto Montes i Bradley.
