= Gnecco =

Gnecco is a surname. Notable people with the surname include:

- Armando Samper Gnecco (1920–2010), Colombian politician
- Jimmy Gnecco (born 1973), American musician
- Luis Gnecco (born 1962), Chilean actor
- Patricio Samper Gnecco (1930–2006), Colombia architect, urbanist and politician

== See also ==
- Gnecco Palace
