= Marcos Lenzoni =

Argentine poet and playwright

Marcos Lenzoni (1894–1924) was an Argentine poet and playwright. Born in Nelson, Santa Fe, Argentina on September 1, 1894. Died on April 25, 1924, in Rosario, Argentina.

Author of Los murciélagos (play, 1919), Un pobre diablo (play 1920), Las que pecan (play 1921) y Nuestras hermanas (play 1922). Marcos Lenzoni published several of his best known work as a poet in the literary magazines El hogar, Atlántida, Mundo Argentino, Apolo, Monos y Monadas and Nosotros. Amongst his most celebrated poems: Ego, El lago, Tarde de lluvia and a compilation of verses dedicated to his home town of Rosario named Mi ciudad published in Transparencias, a magazine founded and edited by Alfredo A. Bianchi and Roberto F. Giusti.

Bibliography: Resurrección de Lenzoni, con un florilegio, Ricardo Ernesto Montes i Bradley. Editorial Palace, Rosario, Argentina, 1945. Florilegio y dos dibujos de Ricardo Warecki y Arzubi Borda.
