= Aero Club Argentino =

Argentinian flying club

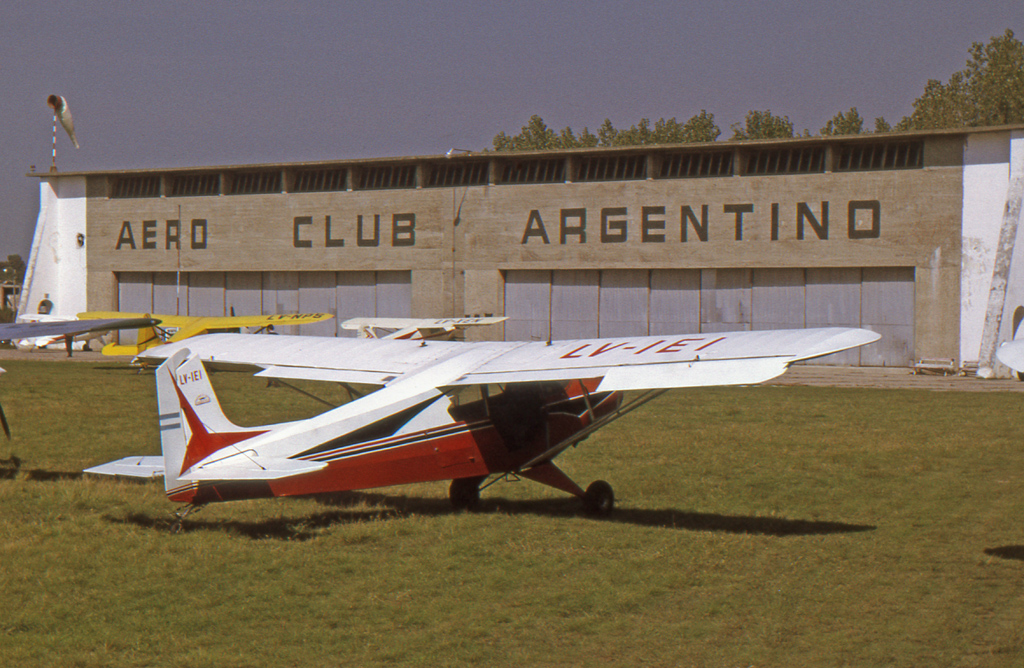
Hangar in San Justo, 1975

The Aero Club Argentino was founded in 1908 by Jorge Newbery, Aaron de Anchorena, Arturo Luisoni, Horacio Anasagasti, Alberto Mascias, Antonio de Marchi, and Carlos Himshe. Initially the club was dedicated to promoting the spirit of aviation sponsoring early experiences with aerostatic balloons.

It was located on the Villa Los Ombués estate in Barrancas de Belgrano, Buenos Aires, then belonging to local business tycoon Ernesto Tornquist and since demolished and now the location of the Embassy of the German Federal Republic.

== External references ==
- Aero Club Argentino
- Parque Aerostático del Aero Club Argentino en Belgrano
