= Pehuajó =

City in Buenos Aires Province, Argentina

- City
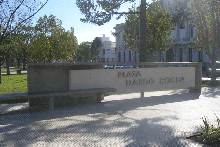

- Location in Argentina
- Coordinates: 35°48′S 61°54′W
- Country: Argentina
- Province: Buenos Aires
- Partido: Pehuajó
- Founded: July 3, 1881

Government
  - Intendant: Pablo Javier Zurro (FPV)

Area
  - City: 17.66 km^{2} (6.82 sq mi)
  - Urban: 10.40 km^{2} (4.02 sq mi)
- Elevation: 83.5 m (274 ft)

Population (2010 census)
  - City: 31,553
- CPA Base: B 6450
- Area code: +54 2396
- Climate: Cfa
- Website: Official website

Pehuajó (Spanish pronunciation: [pewaˈxo]) is a city in the Pehuajó Partido (Pehuajó district) in the province of Buenos Aires, Argentina. The partido has about 38,400 inhabitants as per the 2001 census [INDEC]. The name of this relatively small city is well known in Argentina because of María Elena Walsh's children song Manuelita, about an adventurous turtle (tortoise); a dilapidated concrete statue of María Elena Walsh's Manuelita lies just outside the city, beside Ruta Nacional ("National Route") 5.

== Climate ==
Pehuajó has a humid subtropical climate (Köppen climate classification Cfa). Winters are characterized with moderate temperatures during the day and cold nights with a July mean of 8.3 °C (46.9 °F). During this time of the year, overcast days are more common, averaging 8–10 days per month. Spring and fall are transition seasons featuring warm daytime temperatures and cool nighttime temperatures and are highly variable with some days reaching 37.7 °C (99.9 °F) and below −5 °C (23.0 °F). Summers are hot with a January high of 30.4 °C (86.7 °F) followed by mild nights, averaging 15.7 °C (60.3 °F). The average relative humidity is 75%, with the summer months being drier than the winter months. The average first date of frost is on May 22 while the last date of frost is on September 11. The city is moderately windy throughout the entire year with windspeeds ranging from a low of 9.0 kilometres per hour (5.6 mph) in June to 15.7 kilometres per hour (9.8 mph) in October and November. On average, Pehuajó receives 945.3 millimetres (37 in) of precipitation per year with 83 days with measureable precipitation with summer months being more wetter than the winter months, where most of the precipitation falls in the form of thunderstorms. Pehuajó receives approximately 2,720.1 hours of sunshine per year or 60% of possible sunshine per year, ranging from a low of 41% in June (only 120.0 hours of sunshine per month) to a high of 74% in March (279.7 hours of sunshine per month). The highest recorded temperature was 43.4 °C (110.1 °F) on December 29, 1971 while the lowest recorded temperature was −9.6 °C (14.7 °F) on June 13, 1967.

Climate data for Pehuajó (1991–2020, extremes 1961–present)
Month	Jan	Feb	Mar	Apr	May	Jun	Jul	Aug	Sep	Oct	Nov	Dec	Year
Record high °C (°F)	42.8 (109.0)	39.3 (102.7)	37.7 (99.9)	35.4 (95.7)	30.6 (87.1)	26.7 (80.1)	27.7 (81.9)	36.0 (96.8)	32.6 (90.7)	40.0 (104.0)	37.6 (99.7)	43.4 (110.1)	43.4 (110.1)
Mean daily maximum °C (°F)	29.8 (85.6)	28.5 (83.3)	26.5 (79.7)	22.3 (72.1)	18.2 (64.8)	14.9 (58.8)	14.2 (57.6)	17.0 (62.6)	19.3 (66.7)	22.1 (71.8)	25.8 (78.4)	28.8 (83.8)	22.3 (72.1)
Daily mean °C (°F)	23.0 (73.4)	21.6 (70.9)	19.4 (66.9)	15.5 (59.9)	11.9 (53.4)	8.8 (47.8)	7.8 (46.0)	9.9 (49.8)	12.5 (54.5)	15.7 (60.3)	19.0 (66.2)	21.9 (71.4)	15.6 (60.1)
Mean daily minimum °C (°F)	16.2 (61.2)	15.1 (59.2)	13.3 (55.9)	10.0 (50.0)	7.1 (44.8)	4.0 (39.2)	3.0 (37.4)	4.3 (39.7)	6.5 (43.7)	9.9 (49.8)	12.7 (54.9)	14.9 (58.8)	9.8 (49.6)
Record low °C (°F)	4.9 (40.8)	2.8 (37.0)	−0.5 (31.1)	−2.7 (27.1)	−5.9 (21.4)	−9.6 (14.7)	−7.5 (18.5)	−7.8 (18.0)	−5.8 (21.6)	−3.6 (25.5)	−1.8 (28.8)	2.1 (35.8)	−9.6 (14.7)
Average precipitation mm (inches)	116.0 (4.57)	91.3 (3.59)	128.6 (5.06)	91.2 (3.59)	55.3 (2.18)	25.1 (0.99)	23.8 (0.94)	32.0 (1.26)	57.3 (2.26)	109.0 (4.29)	102.1 (4.02)	109.0 (4.29)	940.7 (37.04)
Average precipitation days (≥ 0.1 mm)	8.3	7.1	8.3	7.5	5.3	4.6	4.9	4.1	6.1	9.3	8.1	8.7	82.2
Average snowy days	0.0	0.0	0.0	0.0	0.0	0.0	0.1	0.0	0.0	0.0	0.0	0.0	0.1
Average relative humidity (%)	68.0	73.0	75.8	77.7	81.0	80.4	78.5	73.8	70.8	72.9	68.5	65.6	73.8
Mean monthly sunshine hours	313.1	257.1	244.9	192.0	167.4	144.0	155.0	189.1	201.0	229.4	282.0	310.0	2,685
Mean daily sunshine hours	10.1	9.1	7.9	6.4	5.4	4.8	5.0	6.1	6.7	7.4	9.4	10.0	7.3
Percentage possible sunshine	72	74	66	63	55	41	45	58	60	58	64	68	60
Source 1: Servicio Meteorológico Nacional
Source 2: UNLP (percent sun only 1971–1980)
