= Eduardo Bradley =

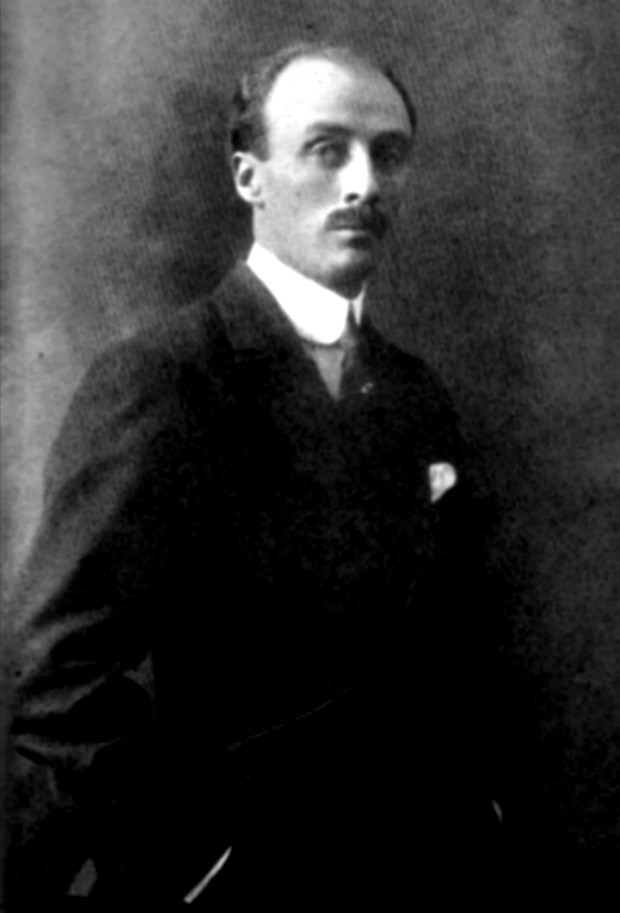
- Born: Eduardo Bradley; 9 April 1887; La Plata, Argentina
- Died: 3 June 1951 (aged 64); Buenos Aires, Argentina
- Resting place: La Recoleta Cemetery
- Occupation: Aviator
- Known for: Crossing of the Andean on Hydrogen Balloon
- Predecessor: Jorge Newbery
- Spouse: Agueda Barrera Nicolson
- Children: Agueda Bradley; Eduardo Bradley; Noemi Susana Bradley
- Parent: Tomás Bradley Sutton (father)
- Relatives: Julio Bradley; Carlos Bradley; Eduardo Montes-Bradley; Ricardo Ernesto Montes i Bradley

Eduardo Bradley (9 April 1887 – 3 June 1951) was an Argentine pilot and balloonist who in 1916 made the first balloon crossing of the Andes. He was a leading figure in the founding of civil aviation in South America.

Born in the city of La Plata, Argentina on April 9, 1887, Bradley was the son of Tomás Bradley Sutton, veteran of the Paraguayan War, and Mary Hayes O’Callaghan. He began his pilot's career alongside Jorge Newbery. His brevet was the first issued following the newly created regulations of the International Civil Aviation Organization. Shortly after Newbery's death in 1914, he set out to honor his late friend by attempting to cross the Andes in an aerostat. Already an experienced balloonist, Bradley had made over one hundred ascensions and set records for altitude (6,900 meters), flight duration (28 hours, 10 minutes), and distance covered in-flight (900 km, to Rio Grande do Sul from Buenos Aires).

== Crossing of the Andes ==
Preliminary studies had determined the crossing should be eastbound, which was the direction the winds carried at the altitude required. This later required moving to Santiago de Chile to make the necessary arrangements. Eduardo Bradley presented his plans to Aero Club Argentino, which eventually provided two balloons and the necessary gear to produce high volumes of hydrogen. Although the balloons turned out to be usable, the hydrogen-producing gear was absolutely worthless. The largest of the two balloons named Eduardo Newbery (after an Argentine aviation pioneer), was chosen by Bradley for the flight. The second balloon, named Teniente Origone, was used for testing prior to the actual crossing of the Andes.

Bradley's first choice for co-pilot was Julio Crespo Vivot, a seasoned aviator with whom he had flown while setting the record for altitude, but Vivot refused to come along on the adventure. In his stead, Bradley selected Angel María Zuloaga, a young army lieutenant.

Once in Chile, the crew had serious difficulties with the generation of hydrogen, due to the accidental loss of most of the sulfuric acid imported from Argentina. Bradley decided to resort to coal gas, produced in Chile and readily available, with a high percentage of hydrogen. The odyssey would have been impossible without the cooperation of Chilean authorities, who responded more favorably to Bradley's request for support than did officials in his native Argentina. The crossing of the Andes on an aerostat filled with coal gas was finally accomplished on June 24, 1916. At an altitude of 8,100 m (26,600 ft), the temperature dropped to −30 °C (−22 °F). The adventure lasted three and a half hours from the moment of liftoff in Santiago to the landing in Cerro de la Cepa, Uspallata, Mendoza, Argentina. Bradley and Zuloaga were welcomed in Argentina as national heroes.

== Later life ==
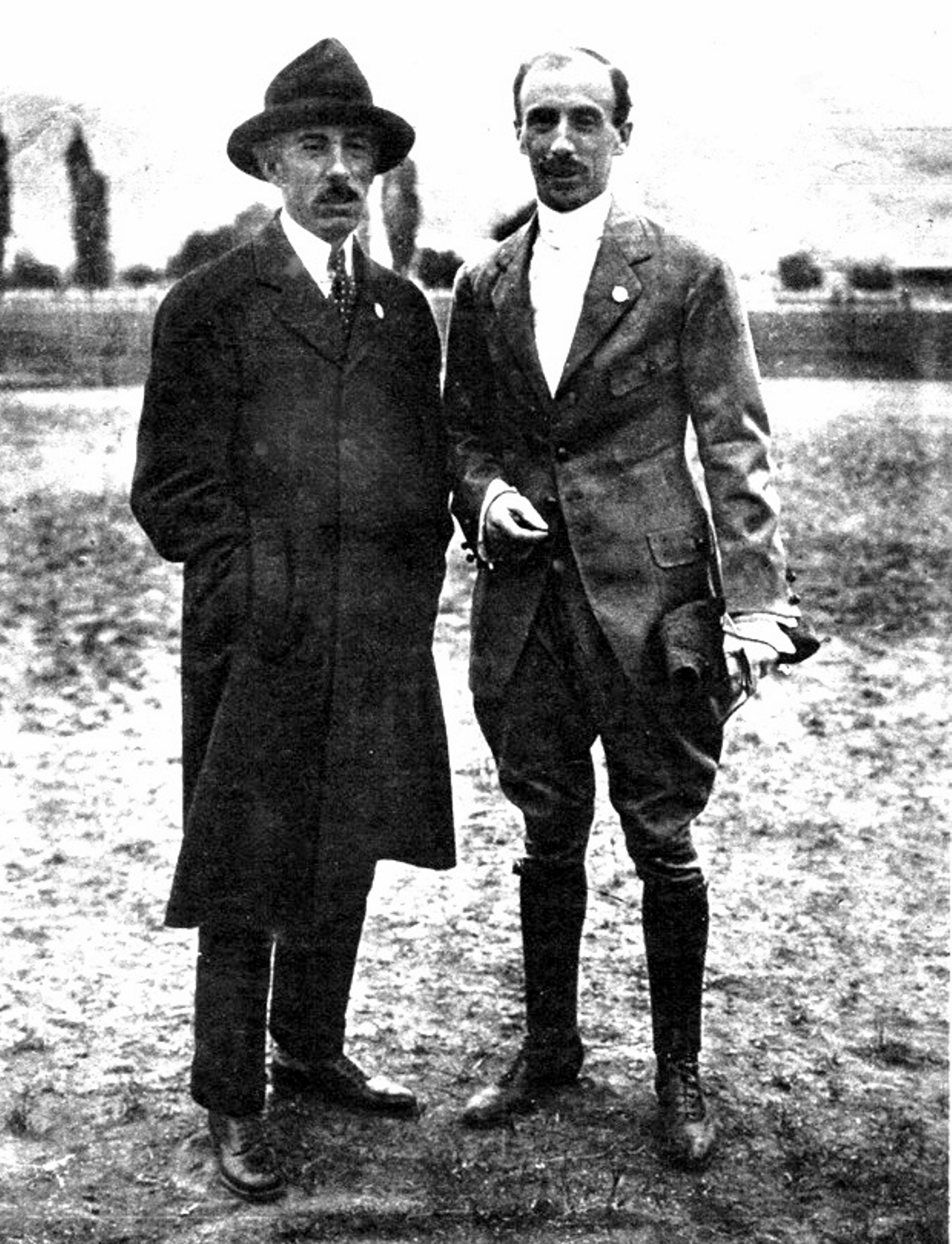
Eduardo Bradley next to Alberto Santos-Dumont

Bradley dedicated The years following the crossing of the Andes to developing the local civil aviation industry to which he devoted the rest of his life. He pioneered NYRBA, a company founded by Ralph O’Neil, in Argentina, and was the manager for Pan American Grace Airways and, later, president of Pan-American Argentina. On September 4, 1929, Bradley, then serving as secretary of the Argentine Department of Aviation, became the first passenger on a direct flight from Buenos Aires to Miami, flying Pan American. The journey lasted 56 hours. The purpose of his visit to the US was to compete for the second time in the Gordon Bennett Cup in ballooning. Eduardo Bradley departed at 4:05 pm in 4th place after pilot Ward T. Van Orman. Eduardo Bradley died in Buenos Aires on June 3, 1951, and is buried in the Cementerio de la Recoleta.

== Bibliography ==
- “La Plata, un belo Horizonte” Revista de Historia. Author Rogério Pereyra Arruda. January 2, 2014
- Más liviano que el aire. Eduardo Bradley (Lighter Than Air) Historias con globos, by Nelson Montes-Bradley. Xlibris, Philadelphia, USA, 2007
- Una vida en las alturas. Memorias del autor. by Washington Bradley. Editorial Dunken, Buenos Aires, 2004
- Jorge Newbery, el conquistador del espacio. by Raúl Larra. Editorial Futuro, Buenos Aires, 1960
- La aerostación Argentina y sus precursores. by Julio Víctor Lirón. Buenos Aires, 1958.
- La victoria de las alas. Historia de la aviación Argentina. by Ángel MaríaZuloaga. El Ateneo. Buenos Aires, 1948
- La Travesía de los Andes en Globo. by Eduardo Bradley. Imprenta Argentina Jacobo Peuser, Buenos Aires, 1916
