= Gnecco Palace =

18th/19th-century palace in Tunis

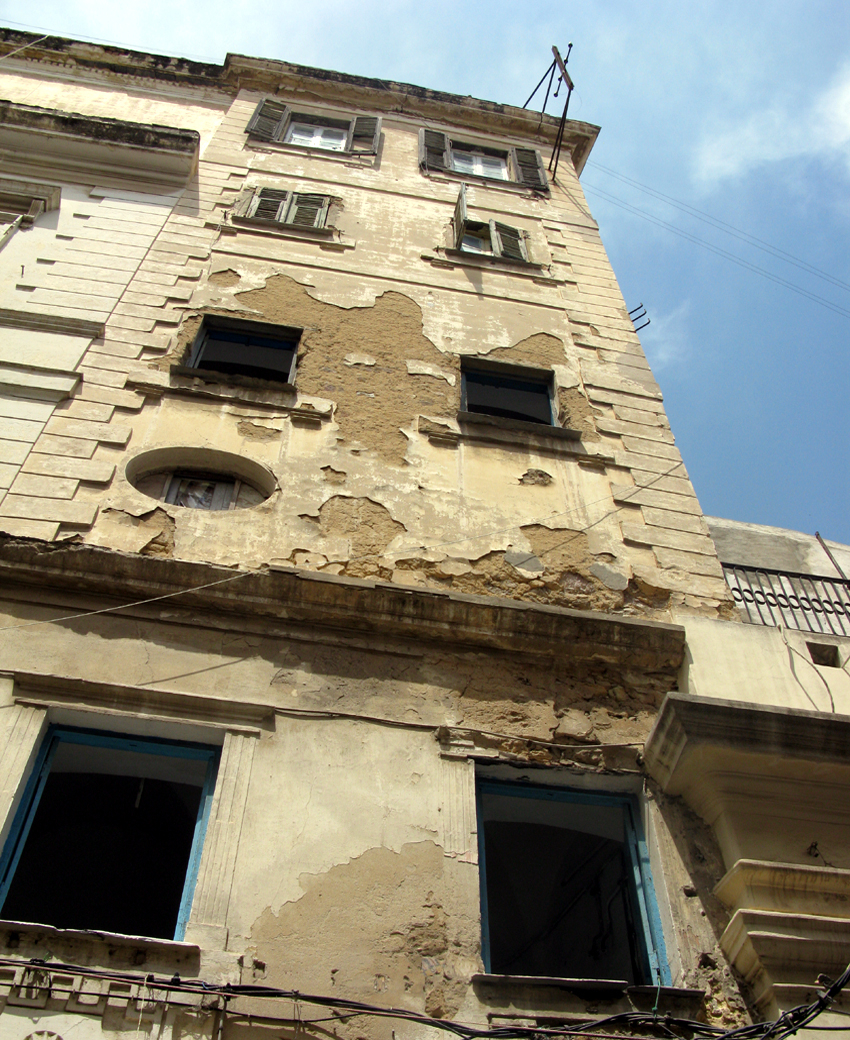
Italian facade of Gnecco Palace

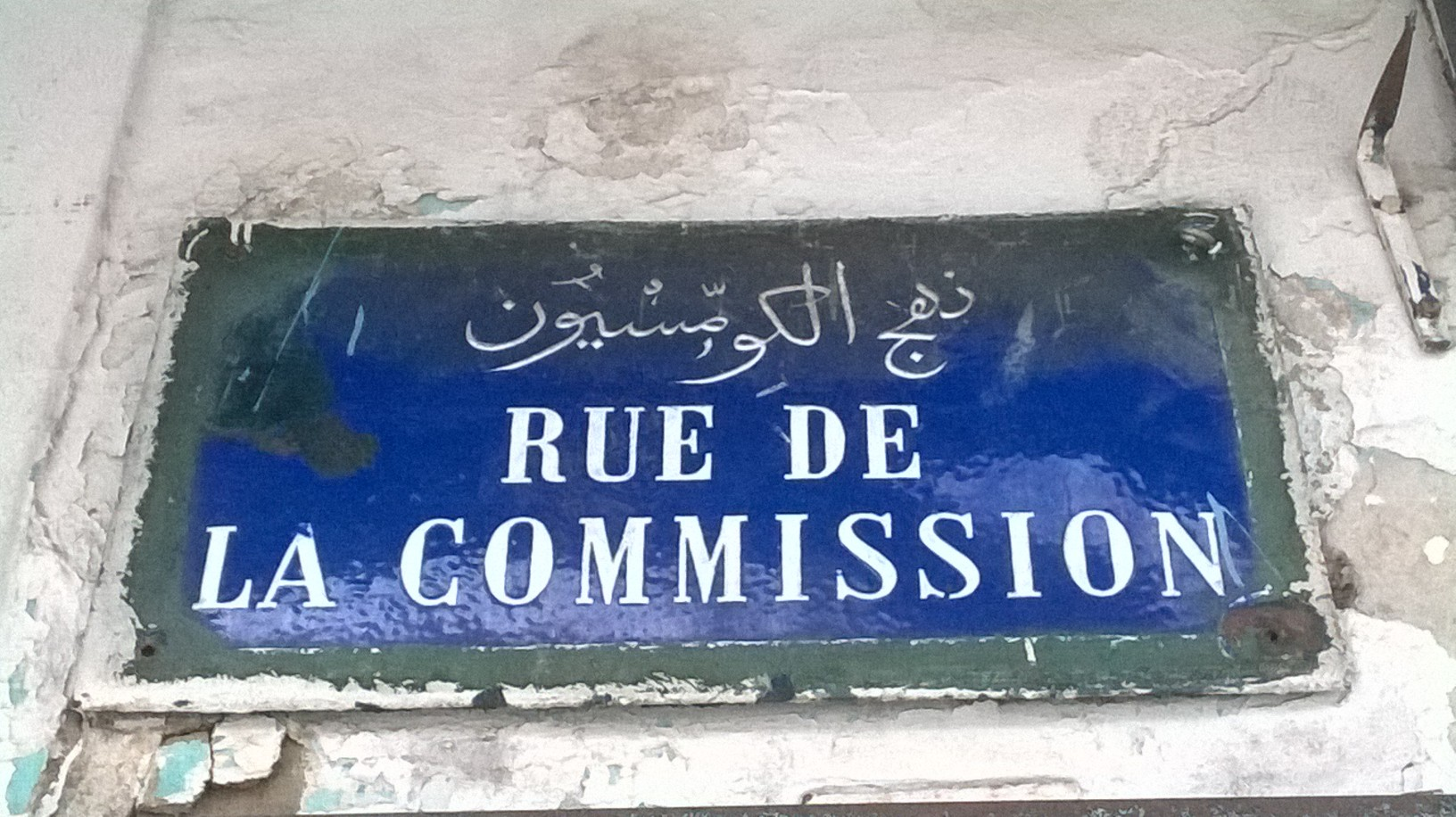
Metallic plaque of the Commission Street

Gnecco Palace, also known as Garibaldi palace and Casa de la liberté, is an old palace in the Medina of Tunis.

== Localization ==
The palace is located in the Commission Street, in the old French neighbourhood.

== History ==
It was built between 1786 and 1866 by Paolo Antonio Gnecco, a rich olive oil and seeds trader.

According to the plaque at the entrance, Giuseppe Garibaldi stayed in the palace during his stay in Tunisia in 1834.

During the 19th century, Giulio Finzi, an Italian lithographer from Livorno, established workshops with lithographic printing machines.

The Franco-Tunisian painter Pierre Boucherle was born in Gnecco Palace on 11 April 1894.

== Architecture ==
Unlike the other palaces of the Medina, this one has the architecture of an Italian palazzo; It has a big portal with columns and an Italian facade with framed windows and pediments.

It has also a courtyard that creates a lighting system for the surrounding rooms.

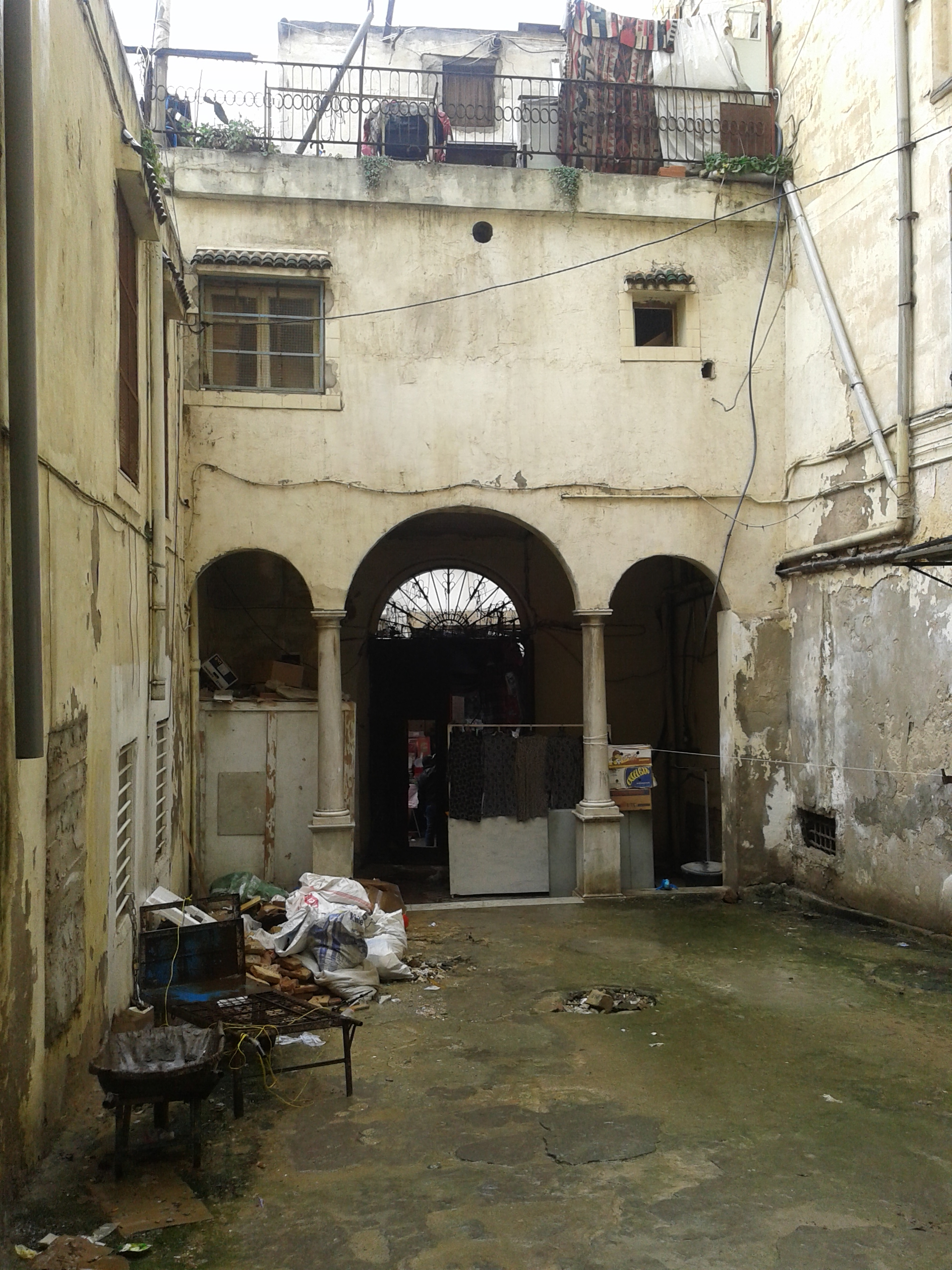
Palace courtyard

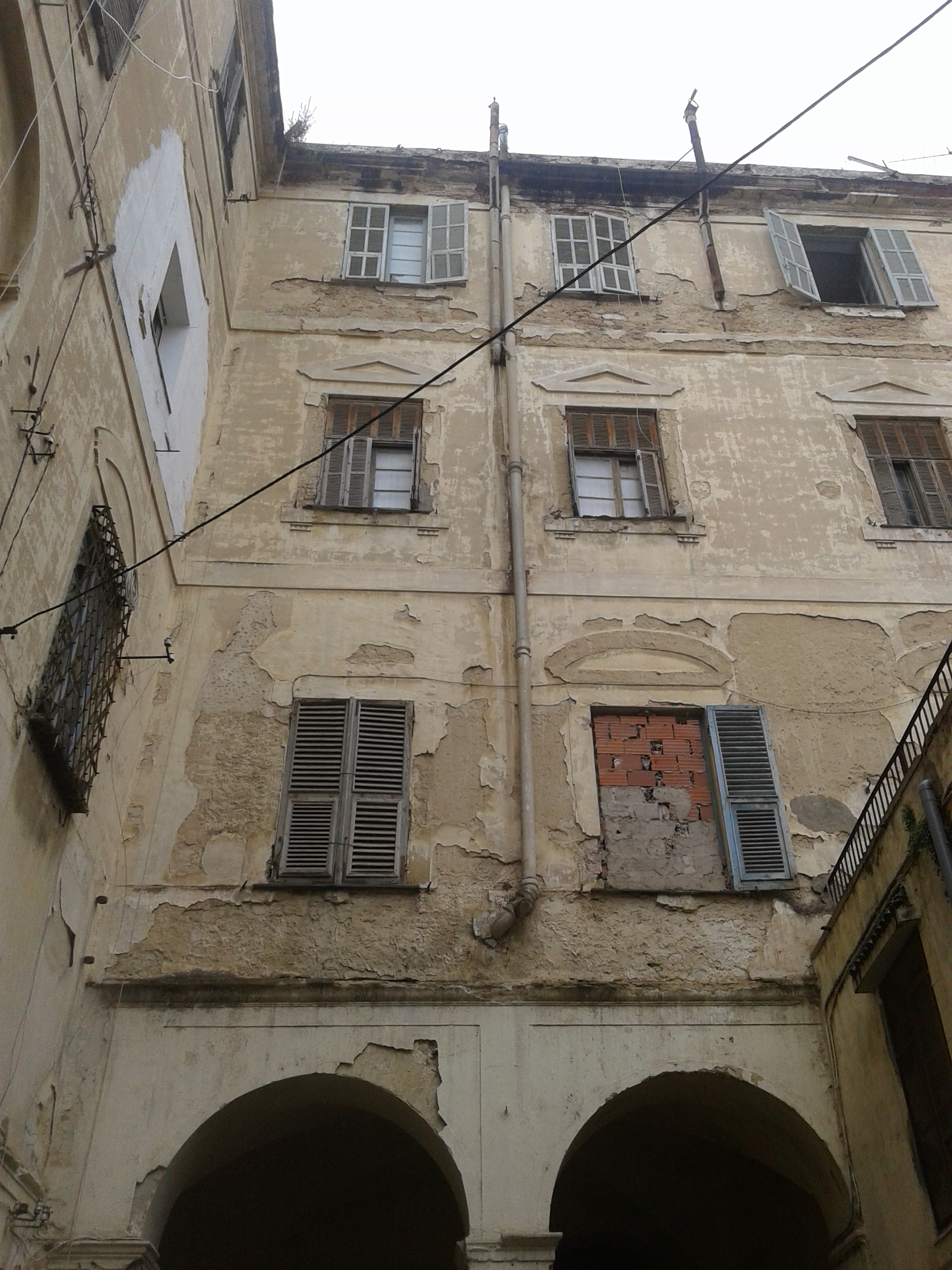
Façade overlooking the courtyard

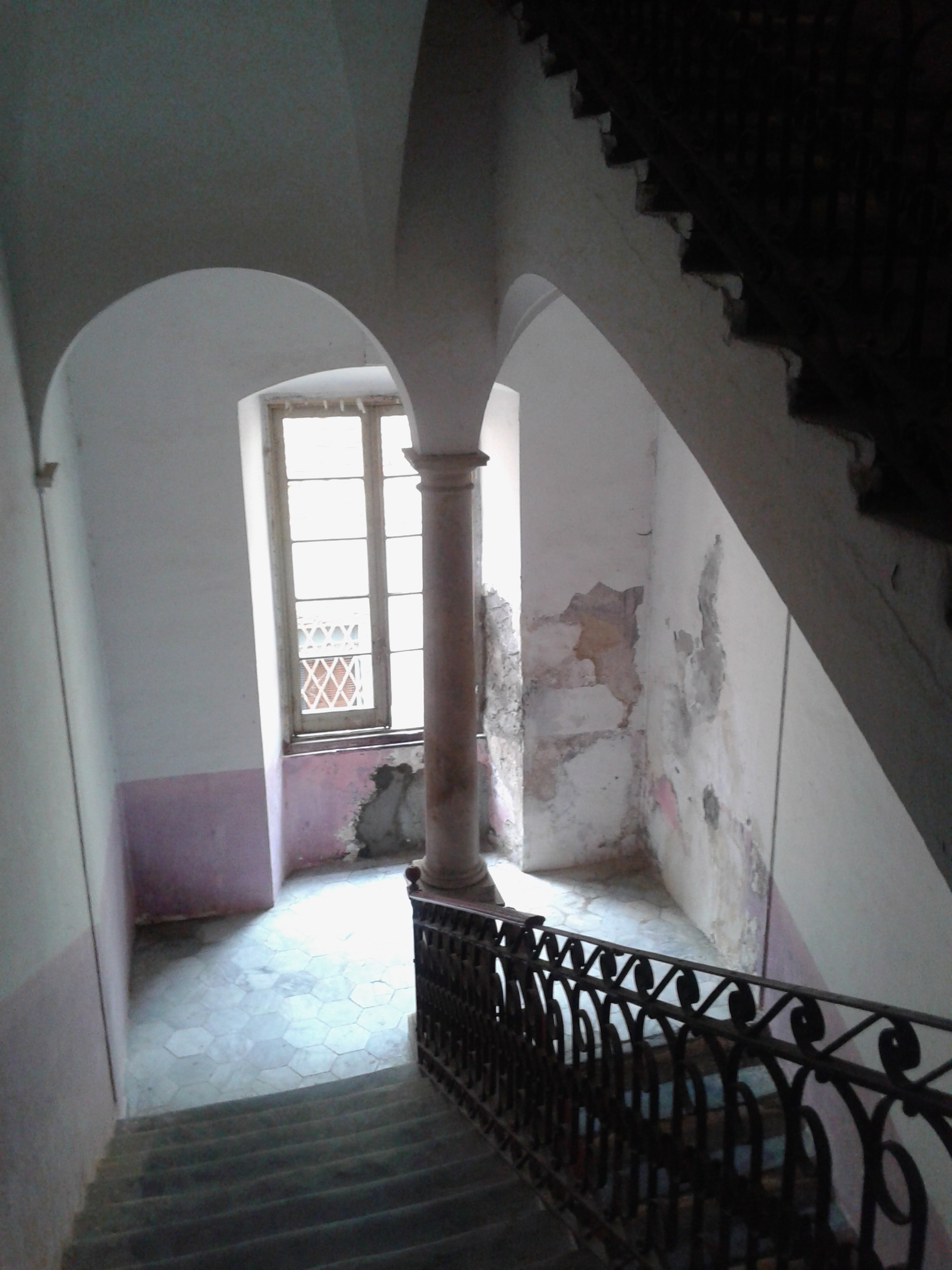
Staircase with column in Carrara marble

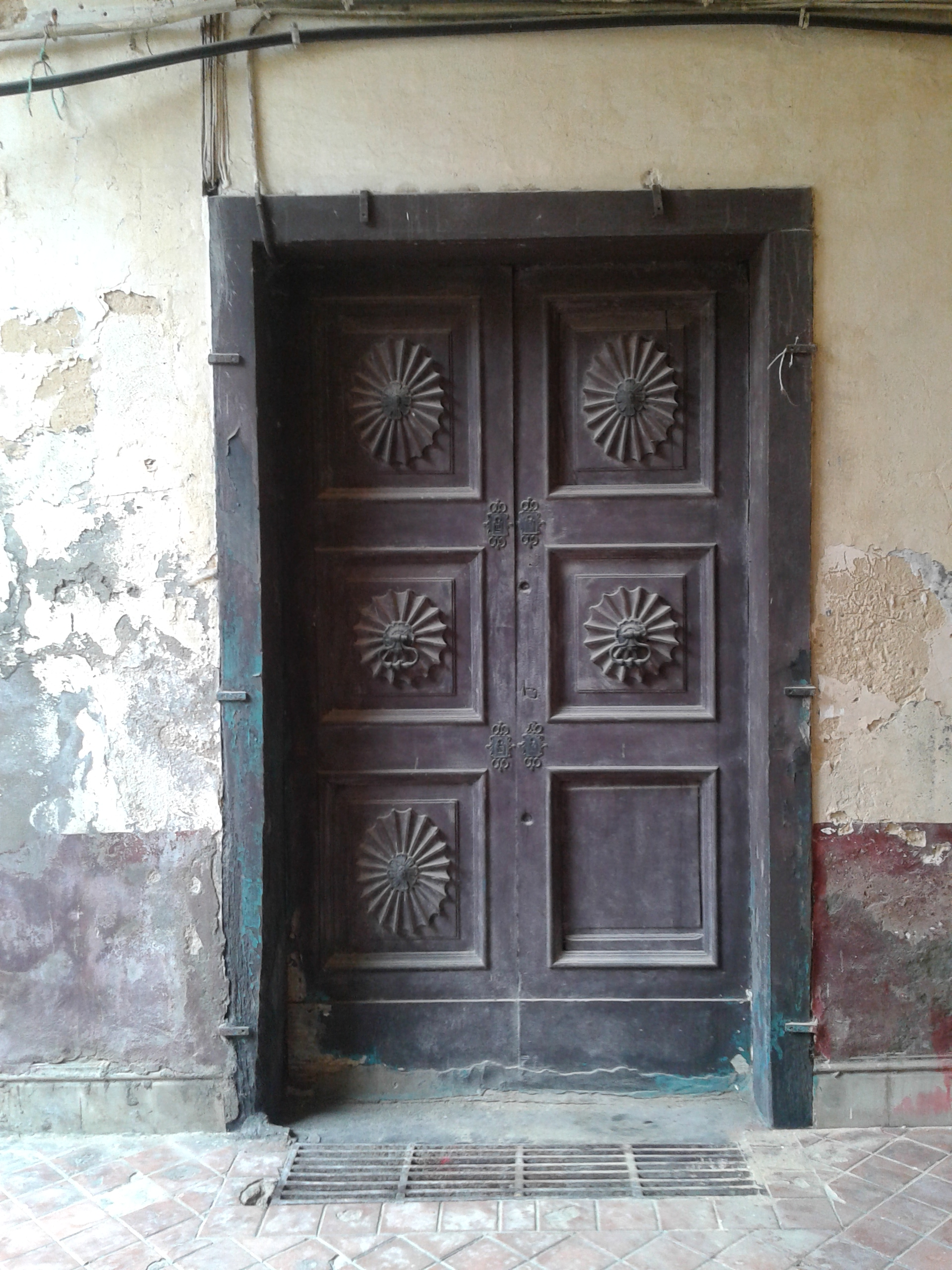
Entrance in the courtyard

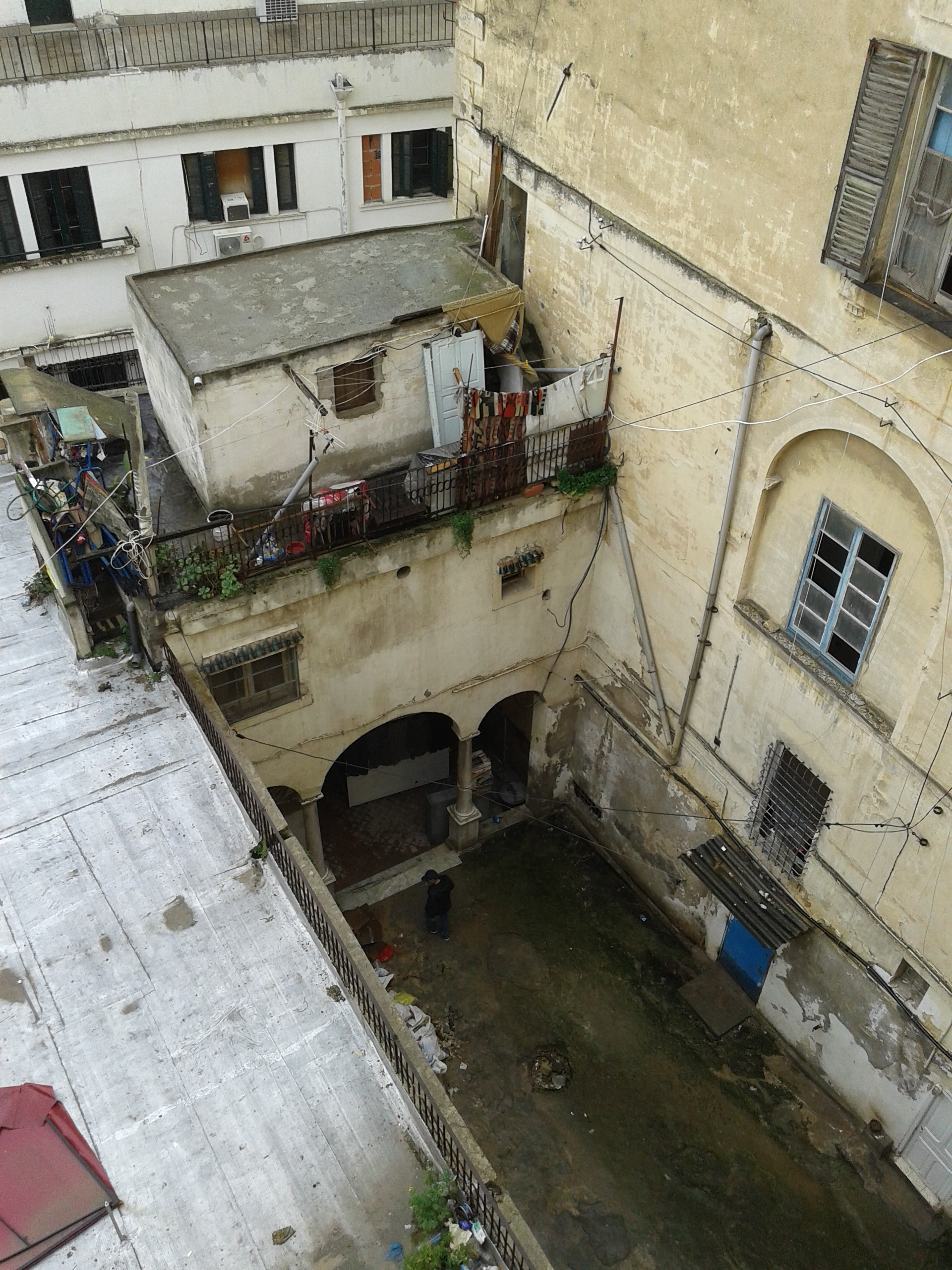
Courtyard

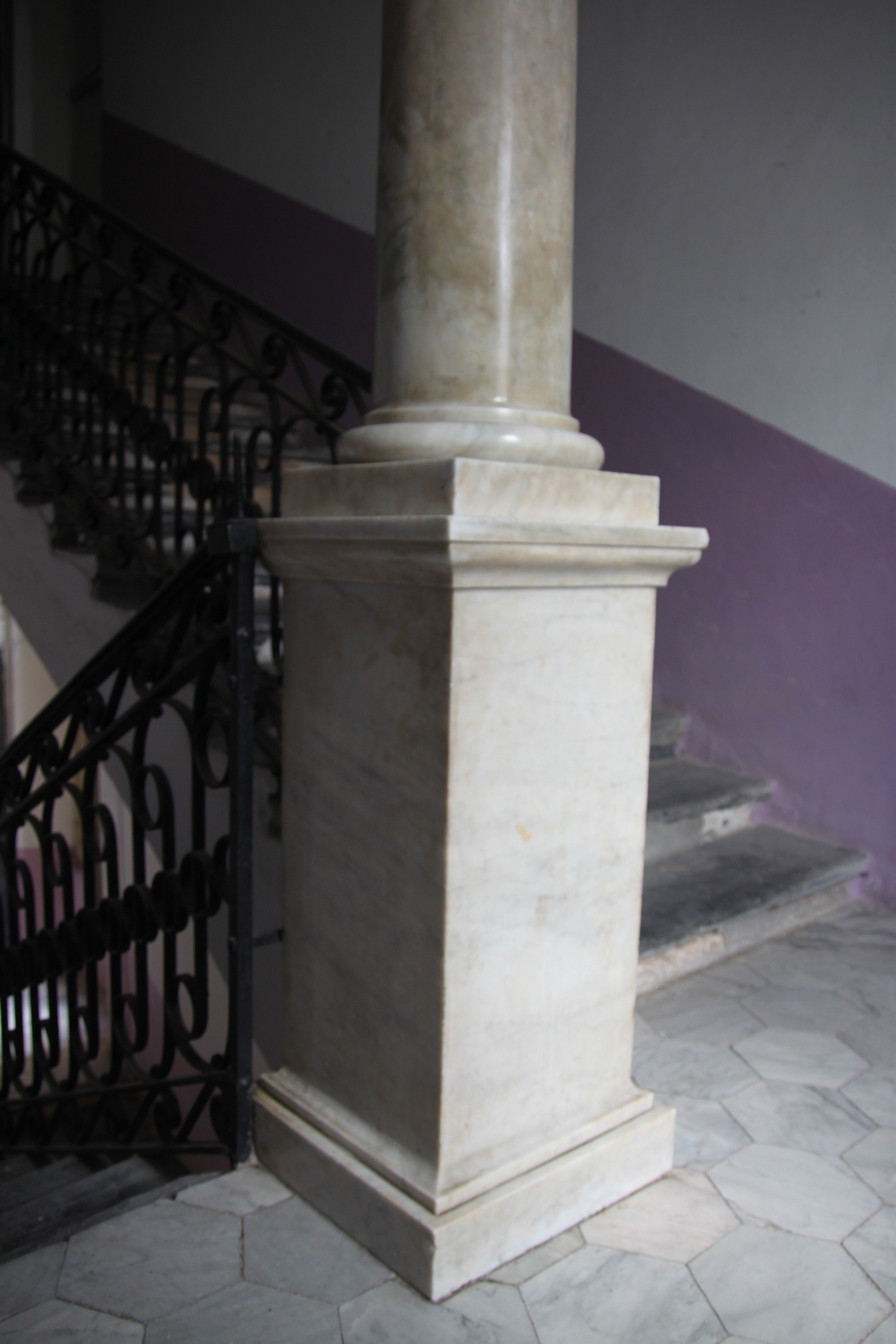
The Carrara marble column
