= Juan Filloy =

Argentine writer (1894–2000)

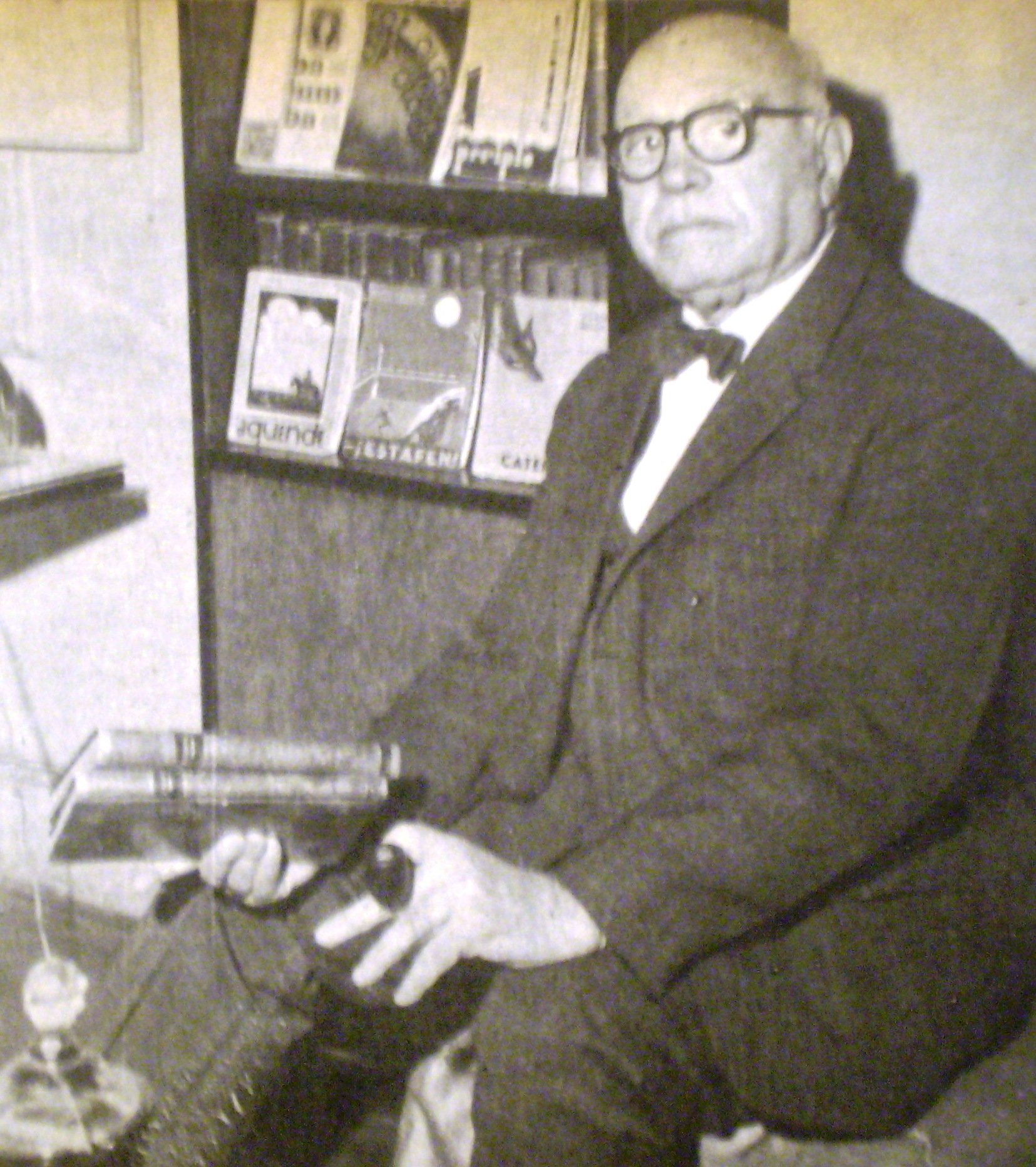
Juan Filloy in 1971

Juan Filloy (1 August 1894 – 15 July 2000) was an Argentine writer. At various times, he was also a swimmer and a boxing referee. He was a polyglot, speaking seven languages. Most of his life was spent in Rio Cuarto where he served as a magistrate.

== Life and career ==
Filloy was born in Córdoba. He received many honors and awards during his lifetime, including a nomination for the Nobel Prize. He wrote 55 novels, all of which were given titles with seven letters: Op Oloop, Caterva, ¡Estafen!, Aquende, La Purga, Metopas, Periplo, Balumba, Sexamor, Tal Cual and Zodíaco are among the best known. He also composed over 6,000 palindromes and coined words which have passed into general usage.

He was friends with (and influenced) Julio Cortázar and Jorge Luis Borges. He was also an acquaintance of Sigmund Freud. He died of natural causes while sleeping, shortly before his 106th birthday. He often said that he wanted to live in three centuries. His burial place is in the "Cementerio San Jerónimo" in Córdoba, Argentina.

== Works in English ==
- Op Oloop; translated by Lisa Dillman. Dalkey Archive Press, 2009. ISBN 978-1-56478-434-6
- Caterva; translated by Brendan Riley. Dalkey Archive Press, 2015. ISBN 978-1628970364

== Works in Dutch ==
- Op Oloop; translated by Arie van der Wal. Afterword by Mempo Giardinelli. Coppens & Frenks, 1994.
- Caterva; translated by Arie van der Wal. Coppens & Frenks, 1998

== Filmography ==
- Ecce Homo. Contrakultura, 2005. Directed by Eduardo Montes-Bradley. Film based on the last known interview with Juan Filloy by Ana Da Costa.
