= List of 2015 films based on actual events =

This is a list of films and miniseries released in 2015 that are based on actual events. All films on this list are from American production unless indicated otherwise.

== 2015 ==
- 7 Days in Hell (2015) – sports mockumentary television film inspired by the Isner–Mahut marathon men's singles match at the 2010 Wimbledon Championships
- 10 Days in a Madhouse (2015) – biographical film about undercover journalist Nellie Bly, a reporter for Joseph Pulitzer's New York World who had herself committed to the Women's Lunatic Asylum on Blackwell's Island to write an exposé on abuses in the institution
- 13 Minutes (German: Elser – Er hätte die Welt verändert) (2015) – German historical drama film telling the true story of Georg Elser's failed attempt to assassinate Adolf Hitler in November 1939
- The 33 (Spanish: Los 33) (2015) – Chilean biographical disaster-survival drama film based on the real events of the 2010 Copiapó mining disaster
- 125 Years Memory (Japanese: 海難 1890) (2015) – Japanese-Turkish historical drama film about the sinking of the Turkish frigate Ertuğrul off the Japanese coast in 1890 and the evacuation of Japanese nationals from Iran in 1985
- A Dark Reflection (2015) – British investigative thriller film based on actual events surrounding the issue of Aerotoxic Syndrome
- A Song for Jenny (2015) – British crime drama television film about Julie Nicholson, whose daughter Jenny was murdered in the 7 July 2005 London bombings
- A Tale of Love and Darkness (Hebrew: סיפור על אהבה וחושך) (2015) – Israeli-American drama film telling the story of Amos Oz's youth, set against the backdrop of the end of the British Mandate for Palestine and the early years of the State of Israel
- A Walk in the Woods (2015) – biographical comedy drama film chronicling Bill Bryson's attempt to thru-hike the Appalachian Trail during the spring and summer of 1996
- ABCD 2 (2015) – Indian Hindi-language dance film partially inspired by the life accounts of Suresh Mukund and Vernon Monteiro
- Abhinetri (Kannada: ಅಭಿನೇತ್ರಿ) (2015) – Indian Kannada-language biographical drama film based on the life of actress Kalpana
- Abzurdah (2015) – Argentine biographical romantic drama film about the life of Cielo Latini detailing her problems with anorexia and bulimia
- The Adderall Diaries (2015) – crime drama film based on the memoir by Stephen Elliott depicting his experiences with addiction
- Airborne (Hindi: हवाईज़ादा) (2015) – Indian Hindi-language drama film about the life of Shivkar Bapuji Talpade who was claimed to have constructed and flown an unmanned, heavier-than-air aircraft in 1895
- Aligarh (Hindi: अलीगढ़) (2015) – Indian Hindi-language biographical drama film telling the true story of Dr. Shrinivas Ramchandra Siras, a professor of Marathi and the head of the Classical Modern Indian Languages Faculty at the famed Aligarh Muslim University
- All Three of Us (French: Nous trois ou rien) (2015) – French biographical comedy drama film based on Kheiron's family's story of escaping the new repressive Iranian regime of the Ayatollah Khomeini and fleeing to France
- Anton Tchékhov 1890 (2015) – French biographical drama film about Anton Chekhov
- April 9th (Danish: 9. april) (2015) – Danish war drama film depicting the German invasion of Denmark which commenced on 9 April 1940 and following a Danish bicycle infantry company sent as a vanguard to slow down the German advance until reinforcements can arrive
- Armi Alive! (Finnish: Armi elää!) (2015) – Finnish biographical drama film based on the life of Finnish entrepreneur Armi Ratia through years 1949–1968 when she founded the textile and clothing company Marimekko and led it to international success
- Arthur & George (2015) – British drama miniseries based on the real-life Great Wyrley Outrages
- Astragal (French: L'Astragale) (2015) – French drama film based on the semi-autobiographical novel L'Astragale by Albertine Sarrazin
- B (Spanish: B, la película) (2015) – Spanish legal drama film based on a transcription of testimony given 15 July 2013 by Luis Bárcenas, former treasurer of the Partido Popular, to Pablo Ruz, one of the judges of Spain's central criminal court, the Audiencia Nacional
- Bajirao Mastani (Hindi: बाजीराव मस्तानी) (2015) – Indian Hindi-language epic historical romance film narrating the story of the Maratha Peshwa Bajirao I and his second wife, Mastani
- Bang Gang (A Modern Love Story) (French: Bang Gang (une histoire d'amour moderne)) (2015) – French drama film following a group of ordinary teenagers who live in the suburban neighborhoods of France and participate in sex parties they refer to as "bang gangs"
- Battle for Sevastopol (Russian: Битва за Севастополь) (2015) – Russian biographical war film about Lyudmila Pavlichenko, a young Soviet woman who joined the Red Army to fight the German invasion of the USSR and became one of the deadliest snipers in World War II
- Beautiful & Twisted (2015) – crime drama television film based on the Murders of Bernice and Ben Novack, Jr.
- Behind 98 (Indonesian: Di Balik Pintu Istana) (2015) – Indonesian drama film telling the story about the Indonesian riot in 1998 which resulted in the fall of the three-decade-long presidency of Suharto
- Bessie (2015) – biographical drama television film about the American blues singer Bessie Smith, and focuses on her transformation as a struggling young singer into "The Empress of the Blues"
- The Big Short (2015) – biographical comedy drama film based on the 2010 book The Big Short: Inside the Doomsday Machine by Michael Lewis showing how the 2008 financial crisis was triggered by the United States housing bubble
- Black Mass (2015) – biographical crime drama film about Irish-American mobster Whitey Bulger
- Blood, Sweat & Tears (Dutch: Bloed, zweet & tranen) (2015) – Dutch biographical film about the late Dutch singer André Hazes
- Born to Be Blue (2015) – Canadian-British drama film about American jazz musician Chet Baker
- Bridge of Spies (2015) – American-German-British historical spy thriller film based on the story of lawyer James B. Donovan, who is entrusted with negotiating the release of Francis Gary Powers—a U.S. Air Force pilot whose U-2 spy plane was shot down over the Soviet Union in 1960—in exchange for Rudolf Abel, a convicted Soviet KGB spy
- Bridgend (2015) – Danish-Welsh drama film based on the Bridgend suicide incidents
- Call Me Francis (Italian: Chiamatemi Francesco) (2015) – Italian biographical film about Pope Francis, from his youth in Buenos Aires and his experiences under the dictatorship of Jorge Rafael Videla to his appointment as pope in 2013
- Captive (2015) – crime thriller drama film based on the true story about Brian Nichols, who escapes from the Fulton County courthouse in Atlanta on March 11, 2005, and holds Ashley Smith as a hostage
- Charlie (2015) – Irish historical drama miniseries depicting the central figure of Irish politics in the 1980s, Charles Haughey
- Child 44 (2015) – mystery thriller film loosely based on the case of Soviet serial killer Andrei Chikatilo
- The Clan (Spanish: El clan) (2015) – Argentine-Spanish biographical crime film based on the case of the Puccio family from Buenos Aires, that kidnapped four people—three of whom they murdered—in the 1980s
- The Classified File (Korean: 극비수사) (2015) – South Korean crime drama film based on a real life kidnapping case in Busan in 1978
- Cleveland Abduction (2015) – crime drama television film based on the kidnapping of three Cleveland women by Ariel Castro in the early 2000s
- Club Life (2015) – drama film about a nightclub promoter tries to make a name for himself in New York City; loosely based on the experiences of Danny Abeckaser
- Coalition (2015) – political drama television film about the formation of a coalition government following the 2010 United Kingdom general election
- Code of a Killer (2015) – British police drama miniseries which tells the true story Alec Jeffreys' discovery of DNA fingerprinting and its introductory use by Detective David Baker in catching the double murderer Colin Pitchfork
- The Cokeville Miracle (2015) – biographical thriller film based on the 1986 Cokeville Elementary School hostage crisis
- Colonia (2015) – historical thriller film based on the 1973 Chilean military coup and the real "Colonia Dignidad", a notorious cult in the South of Chile, led by German lay preacher Paul Schäfer
- Concussion (2015) – biographical sports drama film based on the true story of Dr. Bennet Omalu, a forensic pathologist who fights against the National Football League trying to suppress his research on chronic traumatic encephalopathy (CTE) brain degeneration suffered by professional football players
- The Curse of Clara: A Holiday Tale (2015) – Canadian animated biographical television film based on Vickie Fagan's experience as a young girl studying ballet at Canada's National Ballet School who is cast in the role of Clara in the school's annual production of The Nutcracker
- Cyberbully (2015) – thriller drama television film based entirely on real experiences of cyberbullying
- Danny and the Human Zoo (2015) – British drama television film inspired by Lenny Henry's life as a teenager in 1970s Dudley
- Danny Collins (2015) – comedy drama film inspired by the true story of folk singer Steve Tilston
- The Danish Girl (2015) – biographical romantic drama film inspired by the lives of Danish painters Lili Elbe and Gerda Wegener
- Deadline Gallipoli (2015) – Australian war drama miniseries exploring the Gallipoli Campaign from the point of view of war correspondents Ellis Ashmead-Bartlett, Charles Bean, Keith Murdoch, and Phillip Schuler
- Dolly Parton's Coat of Many Colors (2015) – drama television film detailing Dolly Parton's upbringing in 1955 as her family struggles to live in Tennessee's Great Smoky Mountains, putting a strain on love and faith
- Eadweard (2015) – Canadian biographical drama film about photographer Eadweard Muybridge
- Eddie the Eagle (2015) – biographical sports drama film based on the life of Michael Edwards, a British skier who in 1988 became the first competitor to represent Great Britain in Olympic ski jumping since 1928
- The Eichmann Show (2015) – British drama television film based on the true story of how American TV producer Milton Fruchtman and blacklisted TV director Leo Hurwitz came to broadcast the trial of one of World War II's most notorious Nazis, Adolf Eichmann, in 1961
- Eisenstein in Guanajuato (2015) – biographical romantic comedy-drama film based on Soviet film director Sergei Eisenstein
- El malquerido (2015) – Venezuelan biographical drama film portraying the life of the Venezuelan bolero singer Felipe Pirela
- Embrace of the Serpent (Spanish: El abrazo de la serpiente) (2015) – Colombian-Venezuelan-Argentine adventure drama film inspired by the travel diaries of Theodor Koch-Grünberg and Richard Evans Schultes, and dedicated to lost Amazonian cultures
- The End of the Tour (2015) – biographical drama film about writer David Foster Wallace
- Endgame (2015) – biographical drama film based on the true story of real life teacher Jose Juan "J.J." Guajardo
- The Enfield Haunting (2015) – British horror drama miniseries about a series of bizarre events around the phenomena collectively known as the "Enfield Poltergeist" that took place at a council house from August 1977 to 1979
- Everest (2015) – biographical survival adventure film based on the real events of the 1996 Mount Everest disaster, and focusing on the survival attempts of two expedition groups, one led by Rob Hall and the other by Scott Fischer
- Experimenter (2015) – biographical drama film based on the 1961 Milgram experiment
- Felix Manalo – Philippine biographical drama film about the life of Felix Ysagun Manalo, the first Executive Minister of the Iglesia ni Cristo
- The Fencer (Estonian: Vehkleja) (2015) – Estonian biographical drama film about the life of Endel Nelis, an accomplished Estonian fencer and coach
- Field of Lost Shoes (2015) – war drama film based on the true story of a group of cadets from the Virginia Military Institute who participated in the Battle of New Market against Union forces during the American Civil War
- Flocking (Swedish: Flocken) (2015) – Swedish drama film about a 14-year-old girl who reports that she has been raped, but is not believed - inspired by actual events
- Flying Colors (Japanese: ビリギャル) (2015) – Japanese comedy drama film about real-life pupil Sayaka Kobayashi and how she improved from a high school student who only had the knowledge of 4th-year elementary school student to one who qualified for the prestigious Keio University in just 1.5 years
- Francis: Pray for Me (Spanish: Francisco – El Padre Jorge) (2015) – Argentine biographical drama film narrating the life of Jorge Mario Bergoglio, the man who would later become Pope Francis, in the perspective of a Spanish journalist, who first met the future pope at the 2005 Papal conclave, until the naming of Bergoglio as pope at the 2013 Papal conclave
- Freeheld (2015) – drama film about police officer Laurel Hester's fight against the Ocean County, New Jersey Board of Chosen Freeholders to allow her pension benefits to be transferred to her domestic partner after being diagnosed with terminal cancer
- Full Out (2015) – Canadian teen drama television film based on the life story of American gymnast Ariana Berlin
- The Gamechangers (2015) – British biographical drama television film based on the story of the controversies caused by Grand Theft Auto, a successful video game series, as various attempts were made to halt the production of the games
- Gangster Ka (2015) – Czech action thriller film depicting a fictionalised version of Radovan Krejčíř
- General Luna (Filipino: Heneral Luna) (2015) – Philippine epic war film about Antonio Luna who led the Philippine Revolutionary Army during the early phases of the Philippine–American War
- The Girl King (2015) – biographical drama film about Christina, Queen of Sweden who became queen at age six
- Girl on the Edge (2015) – drama film based on a true story about a teenage girl's encounter with a traumatic event, and learning to accept herself for who she is while struggling to escape her demons
- The Heavy Water War (Norwegian: Kampen om tungtvannet) (2015) – Norwegian war drama miniseries based on the true story of the German nuclear weapon project during the Second World War and the heavy water sabotage in Norway to disrupt it, with a particular emphasis on the role of the Norwegian intelligence officer Leif Tronstad
- The Himalayas (Korean: 히말라야) (2015) – South Korean adventure drama film based on Um Hong-gil's real life, primarily focusing on his mentorship of two other climbers who later died during an ascent
- History of a Clan (Spanish: Historia de un clan) (2015) – Argentine biographical miniseries based on the 1980s exploits of the real-life Puccio family
- Holding the Man (2015) – Australian romantic drama film telling the story of Timothy Conigrave's 15-year love affair with John Caleo, which started when they met in the mid-1970s at Xavier College, an all-boys Jesuit Catholic school in Melbourne, and follows their relationship through the 1990s when they both developed AIDS
- I Am Michael (2015) – biographical drama film about Michael Glatze, a gay activist who renounces homosexuality and becomes a Christian pastor
- I Saw The Light (2015) – biographical drama film about Country music legend Hank Williams
- The Idol (Arabic: يا طير الطاير) (2015) – Palestinian drama film depicting a fictionalized version of the life of Mohammed Assaf, wedding singer from a refugee camp in Gaza who went to win 2013's Arab Idol singing competition
- In the Heart of the Sea (Spanish: En el corazón del mar) (2015) – American-Spanish historical adventure drama film about the sinking of the American whaling ship Essex in 1820, an event that inspired Herman Melville's 1851 novel Moby-Dick
- Ip Man 3 (Chinese: 葉問3) (2015) – Hong Kong biographical martial arts film based on the life of the Wing Chun grandmaster Ip Man
- Jack (2015) – Austrian thriller film about serial killer Jack Unterweger
- Jai Jawaan Jai Kisaan (Hindi: जय जवान जय किसान) (2015) – Indian Hindi-language biographical drama film based on the life of former Indian Prime Minister Lal Bahadur Shastri and is titled after his popular slogan of the same name
- Jan Hus (2015) – Czech historical television film based on the life of Jan Hus
- Jason and Shirley (2015) – comedy drama film revisiting the making of Shirley Clarke's 1967 documentary Portrait of Jason
- Joy (2015) – biographical comedy drama film about a struggling single mom of three children, Joy Mangano, who invented the "Miracle Mop" and became the president of Ingenious Designs, LLC
- Kid Kulafu (2015) – Philippine biographical sports drama film based on the life of the boxing superstar Manny Pacquiao during his childhood
- Kidnapping Freddy Heineken (2015) – British-Dutch crime drama film based on the 1983 kidnapping of Freddy Heineken
- Killing Jesus (2015) – biographical drama film depicting the life of Jesus of Nazareth through the retelling of the political, social, and historical conflicts during the Roman Empire that ultimately led to his crucifixion
- The Lady in the Van (2015) – British comedy drama film based on the true story of Alan Bennett and his interactions with Mary Shepherd, an elderly woman who lived in a dilapidated van on his driveway in London for 15 years
- Land Legs (French: Tempête) (2015) – French drama film telling the story of a father who must choose between his fisherman career and keeping custody of his two children, based on a true story
- Last Cab To Darwin (2015) – Australian drama film inspired by the true story of Max Bell, a taxi driver who traveled from Broken Hill to Darwin to seek euthanasia after he was diagnosed with a terminal illness
- Legend (2015) – British biographical crime thriller film about the Kray Twins which deals with their career and the relationship that bound them together, and follows their gruesome career to life imprisonment in 1969
- Life (2015) – biographical drama film based on the friendship of Life photographer Dennis Stock and Hollywood actor James Dean
- Life in Squares (2015) – British drama miniseries centring on the close and often fraught relationship between sisters, Vanessa Bell and Virginia Woolf, and Vanessa's sexually complicated alliance with gay artist Duncan Grant as they, and their group of like-minded friends, navigate their way through love, sex and artistic life through the first half of the 20th century
- Little Big Master (Chinese: 五個小孩的校長) (2015) – Hong Kong drama film based on a true story where Lilian Lui, former headmistress of an elite kindergarten in Discovery Bay whom originally planned to retire to travel around the world with her husband Alvin Tse, takes up a job with a monthly salary of HK$4,500 to continue educating five remaining pupils single-handedly in Yuen Long's Yuen Kong Kindergarten, which was on the verge for closure in 2009, and puts her travel plans on hold
- The Lizzie Borden Chronicles (2015) – historical crime drama miniseries following Lizzie Borden after she is acquitted of the murders of her father and stepmother in 1892
- London Road (2015) – British musical mystery crime drama film based on their National Theatre musical of the same name, which in turn is based on the interviews about the Steve Wright killings
- Lost in Munich (Czech: Ztraceni v Mnichově) (2015) – Czech comedy film revolving inspired by Lost in La Mancha, a documentary film about Terry Gilliam's unfinished movie
- The Man Who Knew Infinity (2015) – British biographical drama film about the Indian mathematician Srinivasa Ramanujan, based on the 1991 The Man Who Knew Infinity by Robert Kanigel
- Manjhi – The Mountain Man (2015) – Indian Hindi-language biographical film based on the life of Dashrath Manjhi
- Manto (Urdu: منٹو) (2015) – Pakistani biographical drama film based on the life of Pakistani short-story writer Sadat Hassan Manto
- Marguerite (2015) – French comedy drama film loosely inspired by the life of Florence Foster Jenkins
- Marguerite & Julien (French: Marguerite et Julien) (2015) – French historical drama film based on the true story of aristocratic siblings Marguerite and Julien de Ravalet who were executed in the 17th century on charges of incest and adultery
- Mary: The Making of a Princess (2015) – Australian biographical drama television film about Mary, Crown Princess of Denmark
- McFarland, USA (2015) – sports drama film based on the true story of a 1987 cross country team from a mainly Latino high school in McFarland, California
- Me and Charles (Hindi: मैं और चार्ल्स) (2015) – Indian Hindi-language crime film told from the perspective of the Indian cop, Amod Kanth, who handled the case of the Indian Origin French serial killer Charles Sobhraj who was known as the bikini killer
- Mediterranea (2015) – Italian drama film depicting a true story of two friends who cross the Mediterranean Sea to immigrate to Italy, where they experience unexpected hostility from locals
- Michiel de Ruyter (2015) – Dutch historical film about the 17th-century admiral Michiel de Ruyter
- Miles Ahead (2015) – biographical drama film depicting an exploration of the life of jazz musician Miles Davis
- The Miracle (Turkish: Mucize) (2015) – Turkish drama film about a teacher who is transferred to a remote Kurdish village in Eastern Turkey against his family's wishes, based on a true story
- Muhammad: The Messenger of God (Persian: محمد رسول‌الله) (2015) – Iranian religious epic film revolving around the childhood of the Islamic prophet Muhammad
- My All American (2015) – biographical sports drama film based on the life of college football player Freddie Steinmark
- Nise: The Heart of Madness (Portuguese: Nise: O Coração da Loucura) (2015) – Brazilian biographical drama film based on the life of psychiatrist Nise da Silveira, a pioneer of occupational therapy in Brazil
- No Letting Go (2015) – drama film about a young teenager who struggles with a debilitating mental illness as his mom risks everything to save him without losing the rest of her family
- Northern Limit Line (Korean: 연평해전) (2015) – South Korean naval thriller film based on the real-life events of the Second Battle of Yeonpyeong
- Papa: Hemingway in Cuba (2015) – Canadian-American biographical drama film based on events from Ernest Hemingway's life in Havana, Cuba in the 1950s, and on a friendship that developed there between Hemingway and Denne Bart Petitclerc, who was then a young journalist
- The People vs. Fritz Bauer (German: Der Staat gegen Fritz Bauer) (2015) – German biographical drama film chronicling the German Jewish prosecutor Fritz Bauer's post-war capture of former Holocaust planner Adolf Eichmann
- Persona Non Grata (Japanese: 杉原千畝 スギハラチウネ) (2015) – Japanese biographical drama film based on the life of Japanese diplomat Chiune Sugihara who was appointed a vice-consul and later a consul in Lithuania and served there from 1939 to 1940 and who saved lives of some 6,000 Jewish refugees by issuing transit visas to the Japanese Empire
- The Preppie Connection (2015) – crime drama film based on the infamous 1984 incident where Choate Rosemary Hall student Derek Oatis, along with a handful of friends, ran a cocaine smuggling operation on the school's campus
- The Price of Desire (2015) – Belgian-Irish biographical drama film revolving around Eileen Gray's E-1027 villa, one of the first homes Gray designed and also one of the first homes of the modern architecture movement
- The Program (2015) – biographical drama film about Lance Armstrong
- Queen of the Desert (2015) – epic biographical drama film based on the life of British traveller, writer, archaeologist, explorer, cartographer and political officer Gertrude Bell
- The Revenant (2015) – western epic survival drama film based on frontiersman Hugh Glass's experiences in 1823
- Rudramadevi (Telugu: రుద్రమదేవి) (2015) – Indian Telugu-language 3D biographical action film based on the life of Rudrama Devi, one of the prominent rulers of the Kakatiya dynasty in the Deccan
- Sabina K. (2015) – Bosnian drama film inspired by a true story in the aftermath of the war in Bosnia and Herzegovina in the 12 months beginning January 2004
- Saving Mr. Wu (Chinese: 解救吾先生) (2015) – Chinese action crime thriller film based on a true abduction case where cast member Wu Ruofu was the victim
- The Scarapist (2015) – suspense thriller film based on a true story of therapist abuse and related essay written by Jeanne Marie Spicuzza
- The Secret Life of Marilyn Monroe (2015) – biographical drama miniseries depicting a chronicle of Marilyn Monroe's family life and how she succeeded in hiding her most intimate secrets from the press and an invasive world
- Shah (2015) – Pakistani biographical sports film based on the life of boxer Hussain Shah, who won the bronze medal at the 1988 Summer Olympics and became the only boxer in Pakistan's history to secure an Olympic medal
- Show Me a Hero (2015) – biographical drama miniseries about Yonkers mayor Nick Wasicsko
- The Sound of a Flower (Korean: 도리화가) (2015) – South Korean historical drama film based on the life of Jin Chae-seon, who became Joseon's first female pansori singer in 1867
- Spare Parts (2015) – biographical drama film based on the true story of a group of students from Carl Hayden High School, who won the first place over M.I.T. in the 2004 MATE ROV competition
- Spotlight (2015) – biographical crime drama film following The Boston Globe's "Spotlight" team, the oldest continuously operating newspaper investigative journalist unit in the United States, and its investigation into cases of widespread and systemic child sex abuse in the Boston area by numerous Roman Catholic priests
- The Stanford Prison Experiment (2015) – psychological thriller film based on the 1971 Stanford prison experiment, conducted at Stanford University under the supervision of psychology professor Philip Zimbardo, in which students played the role of either a prisoner or prison guard
- Steve Jobs (2015) – biographical drama film covering 14 years in the life of Apple Inc. co-founder Steve Jobs
- Straight Outta Compton (2015) – biographical musical crime drama film depicting the rise and fall of the gangsta rap group N.W.A and its members Eazy-E, Ice Cube, Dr. Dre, MC Ren, and DJ Yella
- Suburra (2015) – Italian neo-noir crime film inspired by true events from the Mafia Capitale
- Suffragette (2015) – historical drama film about women's suffrage in the United Kingdom
- Summer of '92 (Danish: Sommeren '92) (2015) – Danish sports comedy film based on the 1992 UEFA European Football Championship, Denmark's greatest ever football triumph
- Talvar (Hindi: तलवार) (2015) – Indian Hindi-language crime thriller film loosely based on the 2008 Noida double murder case involving a teenage girl and her family's servant
- Tanna (2015) – Australian-Ni-Vanuatu romantic adventure film depicting the true story of a couple who decided to marry for love, rather than obey their parents' wishes
- Teacher of the Nation: Tjokroaminoto (Indonesian: Guru Bangsa: Tjokroaminoto) (2015) – Indonesian biographical drama film following Tjokroaminoto's life as he moves to Surabaya, where he co-founded Sarekat Islam to fight against the colonial regime of the Dutch East Indies
- The Throne (Korean: 사도) (2015) – South Korean historical drama film based on King Yeongjo and his son Crown Prince Sado
- True Story (2015) – mystery drama film based on Christian Longo, a man on the FBI's most-wanted list accused of murdering his wife and three children in Oregon
- Trumbo (2015) – biographical drama film based on the life of Hollywood screenwriter Dalton Trumbo
- Truth – historical political drama film based on American television news producer Mary Mapes's memoir Truth and Duty: The Press, the President and the Privilege of Power focusing on the Killian documents controversy and the resulting last days of news anchor Dan Rather and producer Mary Mapes at CBS News
- Tut (2015) – Canadian-American historical miniseries based on the life of Egyptian pharaoh Tutankhamun
- Twilight Over Burma (2015) – Austrian biographical film about the Austrian-born consort of Sao Kya Seng, the last saopha of Hsipaw
- The Unauthorized Beverly Hills, 90210 Story (2015) – biographical drama television film based on the 1990s television drama Beverly Hills, 90210
- The Unauthorized Full House Story (2015) – biographical drama television film based on the behind-the-scenes making of the sitcom Full House
- The Unauthorized Melrose Place Story (2015) – biographical drama television film based on the behind-the-scenes making of the sitcom Melrose Place
- Visaranai (Tamil: விசாரணை) (2015) – Indian Tamil-language crime drama film dealing with the lives of two men before and after thrown into a kafkaesque scenario in which they get tortured for confession
- The von Trapp Family: A Life of Music (German: Die Trapp Familie - Ein Leben für die Musik) (2015) – Austrian-German musical drama film based on the lives of the Austrian singing Trapp Family
- The Waiting Room (2015) – Canadian drama film loosely based on the life of Jasmin Geljo
- The Walk (2015) – 3D biographical drama film based on the story of 24-year-old French high-wire artist Philippe Petit's walk between the Twin Towers of the World Trade Center on August 7, 1974
- Walt Before Mickey (2015) – biographical drama film about the early years of Walt Disney
- We Will Be the World Champions (Serbian: Бићемо прваци света) (2015) – Serbian sports drama film based on the true story of the Yugoslavia national basketball team who won the 1970 FIBA World Championship
- The White Knights (French: Les Chevaliers Blancs (2015) – Belgian-French drama film inspired by the events of the Zoé's Ark controversy in 2007
- Whitney (2015) – biographical drama television film based on American singer Whitney Houston and her turbulent marriage to R&B artist Bobby Brown
- William the Conqueror (French: Guillaume, la jeunesse du conquérant) (2015) – French historical drama film following William of Normandy in 1066 as he prepares to sail for England
- Woman in Gold (2015) – biographical drama film based on the true story of Maria Altmann, an elderly Jewish refugee living in Cheviot Hills, Los Angeles, who, together with her young lawyer, Randy Schoenberg, fought the government of Austria for almost a decade to reclaim Gustav Klimt's iconic painting of her aunt Adele Bloch-Bauer which was taken by the Nazi's prior to World War II
- Woodlawn (2015) – Christian sports drama film based on the true story of Tony Nathan and the Woodlawn High Colonels football team as coaches and teammates struggle to ease racial tensions during the 1973 desegregation of the Birmingham, Alabama school system
- Yours Truly, Moideen (Malayalam: എന്ന് നിൻ്റെ മൊയ്തീൻ) (2015) – Indian Malayalam-language biographical romantic drama film based on the real-life story of Kanchanamala and B. P. Moideen, which took place in the 1960s in Mukkam, Kozhikode
