= Chino Darín =

Argentine actor (born 1989)

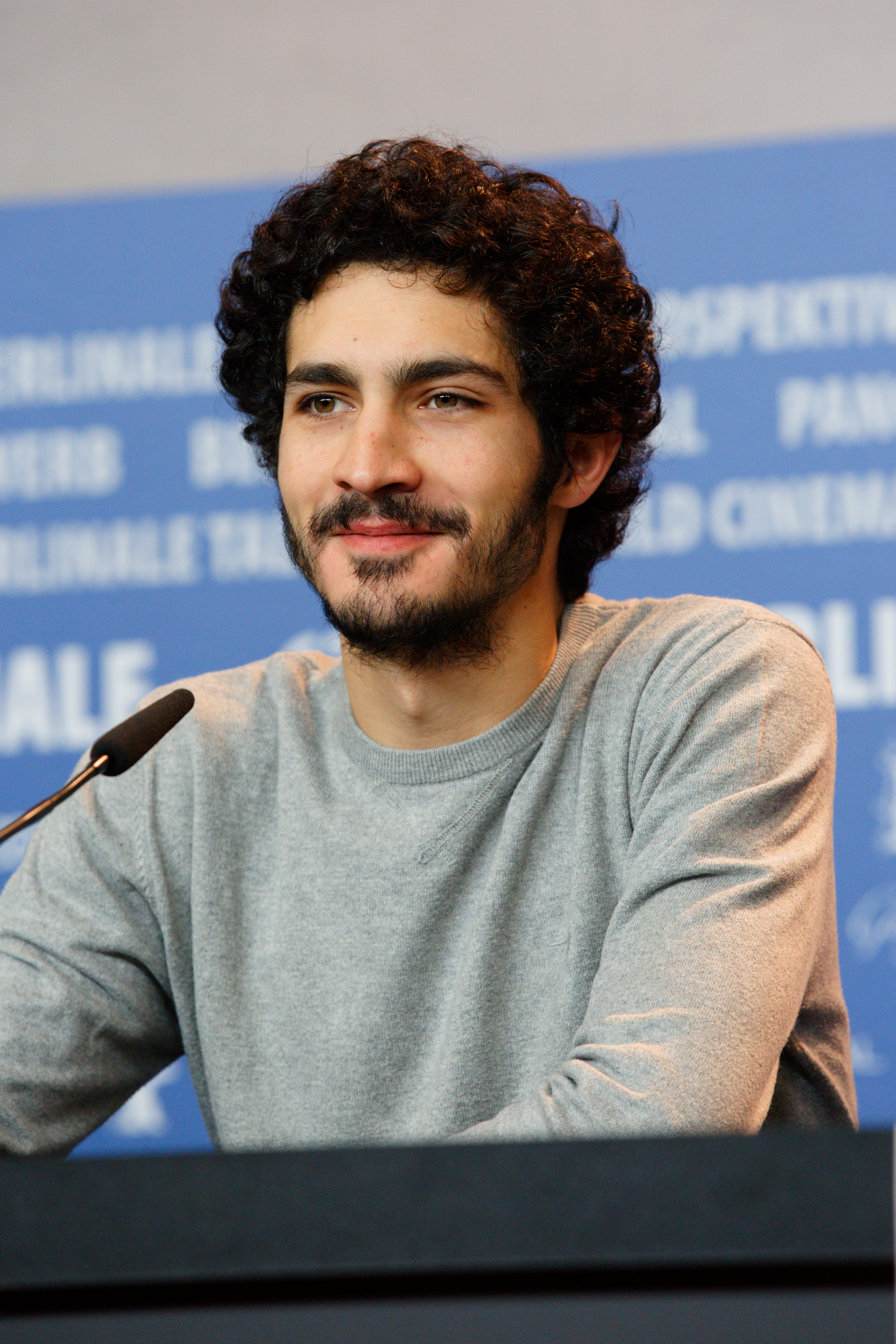
- Darín at the 67th Berlin International Film Festival in 2017
- Born: Ricardo Mario Darín; 14 January 1989 (age 37); San Nicolás de los Arroyos, Buenos Aires, Argentina
- Occupations: Actor; film producer
- Years active: 2010–present
- Partner: Úrsula Corberó (2016–present)
- Children: 1
- Father: Ricardo Darín
- Relatives: Roxana Darín (grandmother)

Ricardo Mario Darín (born 14 January 1989), known professionally as Chino Darín, is an Argentine actor and film producer.

He has had prominent film roles in Death in Buenos Aires (2014), The Queen of Spain (2016) and A Twelve-Year Night (2018). In 2018, he was nominated for the Best Actor award by the Argentine Academy of Cinematography Arts and Sciences, for his role in the true crime film, El Angel.

He is also known for his television roles in Argentina and Spain. He received a Martín Fierro Awards nomination for Best Actor in a miniseries for his role in Historia de un clan (2015). He also appeared in Farsantes (2013-14), La embajada (2016) and El Reino (2021-23). He currently stars in Iron Reign (2024).

== Early life ==
Ricardo Mario Darín was born on 14 January 1989 in San Nicolás de los Arroyos, Buenos Aires Province, to actor Ricardo Darín and Florencia Bas.

== Career ==
He debuted as an actor in 2010 in the Argentine telenovela, Alguien que me quiera, where he rubbed shoulders with figures such as Andrea del Boca, Osvaldo Laport and Miguel Ángel Rodríguez among others. A year later, in 2011, he appeared in Los Únicos, as Dante.

In 2012, he made his film debut starring alongside Diego Peretti and Fernando Tejero, in the Argentine-Spanish film, En fuera de juego.

In 2014, he starred in the film Death in Buenos Aires, where he played the agent "El Ganso", a young homosexual police officer from the 1980s.

In 2015, he starred in three films: the film comedy Volley, directed by Martín Piroyansky, the thriller Pasaje de vida, directed by Diego Corsini, and Uno mismo, an intimate story, directed by Gabriel Arregui. In addition, he had special appearances in the Telefe sitcom Viudas e hijos del Rock & Roll, and in the HBO series El hypnotizador, starring Leonardo Sbaraglia. The same year he starred in the Telefe series, Historia de un clan, directed by Luis Ortega. The series portrays the true story of the Puccio Clan, a family that kidnapped and murdered people in the last years of the last Argentine civic-military dictatorship. There he played Alejandro Puccio, the son of the family patriarch, Arquímedes Puccio.

In 2019, he starred together with his father Ricardo Darín, alongside Luis Brandoni and Verónica Llinás in the film Heroic Losers directed by Sebastián Borensztein and co-produced by himself together with his father. The film is set during the December 2001 riots in Argentina.

From 2021 to 2023, he was part of the cast of the Argentine Netflix series, El reino, along with Diego Peretti, Mercedes Morán and Peter Lanzani.

In 2022, he was one of the producers of Argentina, 1985, a film nominated at 2023 Academy Awards for Best International Feature Film.

Outside of film and television, he also works as a male model and has fronted campaigns for male fashion brands.

== Personal life ==
In June 2016, he announced that he was in a long-term relationship with Spanish actress Úrsula Corberó, whom he met on the set of the TV show La embajada. Their first child, a boy named Dante, was born on February 9, 2026 in Barcelona.

== Filmography ==
=== Film ===
Year	Title	Role	Notes	Ref.
2011	En fuera de juego (Offside)	Gustavo César		
2014	Death in Buenos Aires	El Ganso		
2015	Volley	Ignacio "Nacho"		
2015	Pasaje de vida	Young Miguel		
2015	Uno mismo	One		
2016	The Queen of Spain	Leonardo Sánchez		
2016	Angelita, la doctora	Iván		
2016	Primavera	Gino		
2016	Era el cielo	Néstor		
2018	El ángel	Ramón Peralta		
2018	Las leyes de la termodinámica	Pablo		
2018	A Twelve-Year Night	Mauricio Rosencof		
2018	Mirage	Inspector Leira		
2019	Heroic Losers	Rodrigo Perlassi		
2022	Historias para no contar (Stories Not to Be Told)	Álex		
2022	Argentina, 1985	—N/a	Producer only	
2026	Dante	Eduardo		

=== Television ===
Year	Title	Role	Notes
2010	Alguien que me quiera	Stuka	77 episodes
2011–2012	Los únicos	Dante/Marco Montacuarto	56 episodes
2013–2014	Farsantes	Fabián Graziani	90 episodes
2015	Viudas e hijos del Rock & Roll	Franco Pilares/Franco Bettini	1 episode
2015	El hipnotizador	Gregorio	2 episodes
2015	Historia de un clan	Alejandro Puccio	Main role
2016	La embajada	Carlos Guillén	11 episodes
2021–2023	El reino	Julio Clamens	14 episodes
2023	Mano de hierro	Víctor	6 episodes

=== Host ===
Year	Program	Channel
2013–2014	ESPN redes	ESPN+
2014	Circuito Argentina	América TV

=== Theater ===
Year	Title	Role	Venue	Ref.
2011	Los Kaplan	Sergio Kaplan	Teatro del Globo	

== Awards and nominations ==
List of awards and nominations received by Chino Darín
Ceremony	Year	Nominated work	Category	Result	Ref
ACE Awards	2012	Los Kaplan	Male Revelation	Nominated	
Martín Fierro Awards	2016	Historia de un clan	Best leading actor in miniseries	Nominated	
Bucheon International Fantastic Film Festival	2015	Death in Buenos Aires	Best Actor	Won	
Nickelodeon Argentina Kids' Choice Awards	2012	Los únicos	Revelation	Nominated	
Notirey Awards	2016	Historia de un clan	Best Leading Actor	Won	
Premios Sur	2018	El Angel	Best Actor	Nominated	
Platino Awards	2022	El reino	Best leading actor in miniseries	Nominated	
Tato Awards	2012	Los únicos	Revelation	Nominated	
Tato Awards	2013	Farsantes	Best Supporting Actor	Nominated	
Tato Awards	2015	Historia de un clan	Best Leading Actor	Nominated	
