= Inés Efron =

Argentine actress

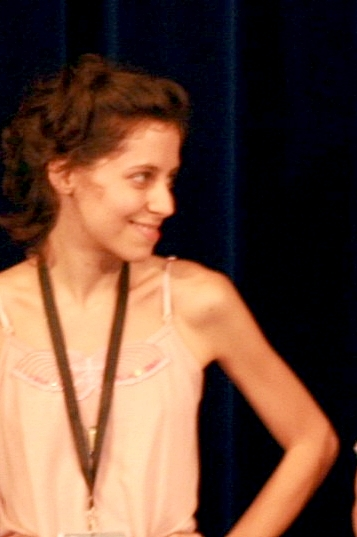
- Inés Efron at Cannes Film Festival in 2007
- Born: May 9, 1984 (age 42); Mexico City, Mexico
- Occupation: Actress
- Years active: 2006–present

Inés Efron (born May 9, 1984, in Mexico City) is a Mexican-born Argentine actress.

== Career ==
Before XXY, Inés Efron starred in Glue, a drama about three teenagers set in a small town in a remote town in Argentina. In her XXY role, Efron's character is a 15-year-old intersex person trying to make a decision about their identity. Efron pointed out that "I liked the Alex character a lot and thought: I can do that. I felt a real connection." For her performance, Efron won the award for Best Actress at the Cartagena Film Festival as well as three other awards. Efron is cited by Internet portal Ciudad.com.ar as "one of the most interesting arising actresses of Buenos Aires." In 2008, she starred in The Headless Woman by Lucrecia Martel; and in 2009 she starred in another one of Lucía Puenzo's films, called The Fish Child. She also worked in theater with Lola Arias in the works Poses para dormir, Sueño con revólver, Temporariamente agotado and Demo of Ignacio Sánchez Mestre.

== Films ==
Year	Movie	Character	Director	Notes
2006	Parece la pierna de una muñeca		Jazmín López	
2006	Glue	Andrea	Alexis Dos Santos	
2006	Cara de queso —mi primer ghetto—	Ruthi	Ariel Winograd	
2007	Hoy no estoy	Ella	Gustavo Taretto	Short film
2007	XXY	Alex	Lucía Puenzo	
2008	La mujer sin cabeza	Candita	Lucrecia Martel	
2008	Cómo estar muerto		Manuel Ferrari	
2008	El nido vacío	Julia Vindel	Daniel Burman	
2008	Amorosa soledad	Soledad	Victoria Galardi and Martín Carranza	
2009	The Fish Child	Lala	Lucía Puenzo	
2010	Cerro Bayo	Inés	Victoria Galardi	
2011	Medianeras	Ana	Gustavo Taretto	
2011	Verdades verdaderas	Laura	Nicolás Gil Lavedra	
2012	Días de vinilo	Vera	Gabriel Nesci	
2013	Back to the Siam	Herself	Gonzalo Roldán	
2015	Volley	Pilar	Martín Piroyansky	
2022	El Vasco	Ines	Jabi Elotengui	

== Awards and nominations ==
Year	Award	Category	Work	Result
2007	Sur Awards	Best Revelation Actress	XXY	Winner
2007	Clarín Awards	Best Actress	XXY	Winner
2007	Clarín Awards	Female Revelation	XXY	Winner
2008	Silver Condor Awards	Best Actress	XXY	Winner
2008	Cartagena Film Festival	Best Actress	XXY	Winner
