= Aníbal Gordon =

Argentine death squad leader (1930–1987)

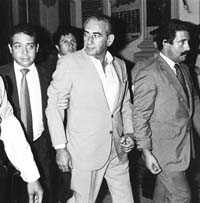
Aníbal Gordon

Aníbal Gordon (1930 – 13 September 1987) was an Argentine criminal suspected of being a leader of the Triple A death squad, active in 1973–1976 against leftist Peronists during the period of rule by the Peróns. He served as an agent of the SIDE intelligence agency between 1968 and 1984. His activities extended into the period of the Dirty War against the political opposition, conducted by the juntas, which ruled from 1976 to 1983. He was also involved with the kidnappings of businessmen in the 1980s by the Puccio family gang.

After his arrest in January 1984, on charges of a 1983 kidnapping, Gordon was later charged with several political murders and kidnappings. He was convicted of three murders of political dissidents committed in 1973–1974, and sentenced in 1986 to 16 years in prison. He died of lung cancer in 1987.

== Background ==
Aníbal Gordon was born in Colón to an Argentine family of Scots descent. He started getting in trouble from an early age. He developed a business of commercial displays for plastics and metals, which was used in the beginning to finance his other activities. He hired numerous young men, typically about age 19, who became a gang. His police record noted various criminal offenses between 1951 and 1972, including armed robbery. In 1971 he had sent his crew to Ezeiza to take weapons off a plane. They also filled several drums with naphtha, which Gordon sold undercover to other airfields.

He began working as an agent of SIDE, and was with them between 1968 and 1984. Freed from jail in 1973, he allegedly engaged in racketeering, and kidnappings and assassinations on behalf of the government. Gordon was associated with groups of the extreme right which later would try to destabilize the new democratic government of Raul Alfonsín.

Gordon was arrested in the mountains of Córdoba Province in January 1984. He was first charged with the kidnapping of activist Guillermo Patricio Kelly, which had taken place on 24 August 1983. Other charges were later made against him. He was convicted in 1985 of executing the murders of labor leader José Rucci in 1973, and Silvio Frondizi, a professor and brother of the President, and Rodolfo Ortega Peña in 1974, all during the period of Triple A.

In the 1980s, he also was involved with the Arquímedes Puccio family kidnapping gang, whose leading members were convicted in 1985 of four kidnappings of businessmen in the 1980s. Puccio, his son and ex-rugby player Alejandro Puccio, Gustavo Contepomi, and retired Coronel Rodolfo Victoriano Franco were among others convicted in the gang. They were sentenced to life in August 1985.

At the time of Gordon's death in prison in 1987, the former intelligence agent had been charged in several kidnappings and murders. Gordon always denied being part of the Triple A. He acknowledged having worked during the Dirty War in the secret detention center of the Automotores Orletti, where interrogation under torture and executions were performed under the military dictatorship (El proceso) (1976–1983).

Gordon was sentenced October 1986 to sixteen years of prison. He died in jail from lung cancer, on 13 September 1987.
