= Puccio =

Puccio is both an Italian surname and a masculine Italian given name. Notable people with the name include:

== People with the surname ==
- Alejandro Puccio (1958–2008), Argentine rugby union player and criminal
- Alessio Puccio (born 1986), Italian voice actor
- Alex Puccio (born 1989), American rock climber
- Arquímedes Puccio (1929–2013), Argentine criminal
- Carlos López Puccio (born 1946), Argentine musician
- Gabriele Puccio (born 1989), Italian footballer
- Gary Puccio, American college baseball coach
- Marty Puccio (born 1973), American murderer
- Puccio family, Argentine crime family
- Salvatore Puccio (born 1989), Italian cyclist
- Thomas Puccio (1944–2012), American trial attorney
- Val Puccio (1965–2011), American wrestler
- Vincenzo Puccio (1945–1989), Sicilian mafioso

== People with the given name ==
- Puccio Capanna, Italian painter
- Puccio Pucci (lawyer) (1904–1985), Italian lawyer and sports official
- Puccio Pucci (politician) (1389–1449), Florence
- Puccio di Simone (fl. 1346–1358), Italian Gothic painter
