= Pucillo =

Pucillo is a surname. Notable people with the surname include:

- Lou Pucillo (born 1936), American basketball player
- Mike Pucillo (born 1979), American football player

== See also ==
- Puccio
