= Sidewalls (short film) =

- Directed by: Gustavo Taretto
- Written by: Gustavo Taretto
- Produced by: Simón Franco; Gustavo Taretto
- Starring: Mariana Anghileri; Javier Drolas
- Cinematography: Leandro Martínez
- Edited by: Pablo Mari
- Music by: Gabriel Chwojnik
- Release date: 2005
- Running time: 28 minutes
- Country: Argentina
- Language: Spanish
- Budget: 2 000 USD (estimated)

Sidewalls (Spanish: Medianeras) is a 2005 Argentinian short film written and directed by Gustavo Taretto. The movie focuses on two inhabitants of an overpopulated area of Buenos Aires, a woman (Mariana Anghileri) and a man (Javier Drolas), who, despite living on the same street, have never met before. Based on this plot, the director released a long film with the same name in 2011.

After its release, the short film reached a success which was unexpected for its director, who had initially had the idea to make a feature film but "was too lazy to carry it out" and preferred to make a short film first as a draft. The short film won around forty awards worldwide, including Best Short Film at the Mar del Plata International Film Festival, Best Narrative Short Film at the LA Film Festival and the Grand Prix at the Clermont-Ferrand International Short Film Festival.
