= XXY (film) =

2007 film by Lucía Puenzo

- Theatrical release poster
- Directed by: Lucía Puenzo
- Written by: Lucía Puenzo
- Based on: Cinismo by Sergio Bizzio
- Produced by: Luis Puenzo; José María Morales; Carla Pelligra; Fernando Sirianni; Fabienne Vonier
- Starring: Ricardo Darín; Valeria Bertuccelli; Inés Efron; Martín Piroyansky; Carolina Peleritti
- Cinematography: Natasha Braier
- Edited by: Alex Zito
- Music by: Andrés Goldstein; Daniel Tarrab
- Production companies: Cinéfondation; Ministry of Culture (Spain)
- Distributed by: Distribution Company (Argentina); Pyramide Distribution (France); Wanda Visión (Spain)
- Release dates: 20 May 2007 (Cannes); 14 June 2007 (Argentina); 7 September 2007 (Toronto); 26 December 2007 (France); 11 January 2008 (Spain)
- Running time: 91 minutes
- Countries: Argentina; Spain; France
- Language: Spanish
- Box office: $2,728,869

XXY is a 2007 drama film written and directed by Lucía Puenzo and starring Ricardo Darín, Valeria Bertuccelli, Inés Efron and Martín Piroyansky. Based on the short story Cinismo (Cynicism), included in the book Chicos (Boys) by author Sergio Bizzio, the film tells the story of a 15-year-old intersex person, the way her family copes with her condition and the ultimate decision that she must eventually make as she struggles to define her own gender identity within a society that expects certain behaviors from every individual.

XXY received positive reviews from critics, winning the Critics' Week grand prize at the 2007 Cannes film festival, as well as the ACID/CCAS Support Award. It was nominated for eight awards at the 2008 Argentine Film Critics Association Awards, winning three of them including Best Film, and was nominated or won awards at a number of other foreign film festivals. It was chosen to close the 2008 Melbourne Queer Film Festival and had a short run theatrical release before being released onto DVD. The film also won the Goya Award for Best Spanish Language Foreign Film and the Golden Crow Pheasant at the International Film Festival of Kerala. The film is widely known for how it has portrayed intersex identity in such a sensitive way as well as critiqued the binary gender norms.

== Plot ==
Alex Kraken is a 15-year-old intersex person, born with both male and female genitalia, who has been living as a female and taking medication to suppress masculine physical traits. At the beginning of the film, Alex stopped taking her medication without telling her parents, which would allow her masculine physical traits to begin developing.

Alex's parents moved with her from Argentina to a village by the sea in Uruguay to avoid discrimination and rigid gender expectations. They hoped to shelter her from the bullying. Her father, Néstor Kraken, is a marine biologist who treats wounded animals found by fishermen. Her mother, Suli, invites friends from Argentina: a surgeon, his wife, and their teenage son, Álvaro. The purpose of the visit, unknown to Néstor and Alex, is to discuss the possibility of sex reassignment surgery, as Suli hopes that Alex will decide to continue living as female and undergo all of the procedure.

During the visit, Alex and Álvaro begin a relationship. When Alex asks Álvaro if he would like to have sex, he initially refuses, but later follows her from the beach. They then have a sexual encounter, during which Alex takes the penetrative role. Néstor catches sight of them through the door, and they stop. Álvaro then rushes out. When Alex later apologizes, Álvaro tells her that he did not dislike the experience at all.

After witnessing the encounter between Alex and Álvaro, Néstor realizes that Alex is old enough to make decisions about her own life and sexual identity, and he seeks advice from a transgender man he had read about in newspapers years earlier. The man tells him that he appreciates that Alex's parents did not make that decision for her at birth and instead allowed her to decide for herself. After the conversation, Néstor returns with the understanding that Alex must make her own decision.

Later, three boys from the village sexually assault Alex by forcibly pulling down her pants to see her genitalia. The assault is carried out by friends of Vando, Alex's former friend. Néstor realizes that reporting the assault to the police would cause the whole village to learn about Alex's condition. However, Alex says that it does not matter. Alex also decides that she does not want to resume taking medication or undergo surgery. When asked by her father whether she wants to choose to be either male or female, Alex replies, "What if there is nothing to choose?"

Álvaro and his family prepare to board a boat back to Buenos Aires. There is still tension between Alex and Álvaro after their previous encounter. Álvaro leaves his family briefly to sit with Alex behind a sea wall on the beach. He shows her that he has begun wearing the turtle tag she had given him. He asks whether he will ever see her again, and she tells him that she does not think he will. They tell each other that they have fallen in love, but when Álvaro tries to kiss Alex, she pushes him away. She asks him whether he regrets not seeing her again or not getting to see "it" more. She then pulls down her pants to show Álvaro her genitalia. The film does not reveal what Álvaro sees. Álvaro's father pulls him away, and Alex remains by the wall crying before returning to her family.

The film ends with Alex and her family leaving their guests at the boat and walking down the boardwalk. Alex takes her father's hand as they walk away.

== Cast ==
- Ricardo Darín as Néstor Kraken
- Valeria Bertuccelli as Suli Kraken
- Inés Efron as Alex Kraken
- Germán Palacios as Ramiro
- Martín Piroyansky as Álvaro
- Carolina Peleritti as Erika
- Guillermo Angelelli as Juan
- César Troncoso as Washington
- Jean Pierre Reguerraz as Esteban
- Ailín Salas as Roberta
- Luciano Martín Nóbile as Vando
- Lucas Escariz as Saul

== Reception ==
The film received generally favorable reviews from critics. The film-critics aggregate Rotten Tomatoes reported 82% of critics gave the film a positive review based on 44 reviews, with an average score of 6.8/10. The critical consensus is: "This sharp directorial debut by Lucia Puenzo treats the challenging subject of intersex with intelligence and sensitivity." Metacritic, which assigns a standardized score out of 100, rated the film 67 based on 15 reviews, indicating "generally favorable reviews". Roger Ebert gave the film 3.5 stars of out 4.

Ines Efron also received much critical acclaim for her performance in this film. Efron won the award for Best Actress at the Cartagena Film Festival as well as three other awards. She is also cited by Internet portal Ciudad.com.ar as "one of the most interesting arising actresses of Buenos Aires." She has been praised for depicting the character of Alex as a balanced combination of male and female, without leaning too far towards one or the other.

Many critics have applauded the film's sensitive and realistic approach to intersexuality. explained that the film avoids all type of sensationalism and focuses more on the emotional side and experiences of each of the characters. Critics from also mentioned how the film goes into themes like adolescence, identity, and personal autonomy without relying on dramatic exaggeration. Overall, the film was recognized for its ability to call out for reflection on these social issues.

== Themes ==
The film XXY dives deep into central themes such as intersex identity, gender norms, and bodily autonomy. XXY avoids sensationalism and presents the main character's experience sensitively.

Many critics have talked about how the film focuses on the process of identity formation during adolescence. Not only that, but it shows the social and personal conflicts faced by intersex individuals. Apart from that, the films challenges social and medical expectations about gender, in terms of surgical interventions.

The film is known for promoting empathy toward intersex people by focusing on their human experiences and not medicalizing or objectifying their bodies. XXY shows the impact social pressure can have on influencing one's personal development.

== See also ==
- Klinefelter syndrome - This syndrome doesn't represent the intersex experience shown in the film, but there has been debate regarding the use of the syndrome for the title of the film.
- Intersex
- Hermaphrodite
