= The Fish Child =

2009 Argentine film

- Directed by: Lucía Puenzo
- Written by: Lucía Puenzo
- Produced by: Luis Puenzo; José María Morales
- Starring: Inés Efron; Mariela Vitale; Pep Munné
- Cinematography: Rodrigo Pulpeiro
- Edited by: Hugo Primero
- Music by: Andrés Goldstein & Daniel Tarrab, Laura Zisman
- Distributed by: Wanda Visión, MK2 Diffusion (FR)
- Release date: 6 February 2009
- Running time: 96 minutes
- Country: Argentina
- Languages: Spanish, Guaraní

The Fish Child (Spanish: El niño pez) is a 2009 Argentine drama film directed by Lucía Puenzo. The film is a loose adaptation of Puenzo's first novel of the same name. The film premiered in the Panorama section at the 59th Berlin International Film Festival.

== Plot ==
Lala (Inés Efron) a girl from an affluent Argentinian family and daughter of a successful judge, is in love with Ailin (Mariela Vitale) who has worked as a maid for her family since she was 13. The two lovers are desperate to be together and hatch a plan to run away to Ailin's hometown of Lake Ypoa Paraguay. Lala steals paintings and other items from even at times her own family in order to finance their escape. As the movie continues, showing scenes in non-chronological order, mysteries of Ailin's past life, including her connection to the story tale called the Fish Child, are revealed. The two lovers find themselves in the face of crime, and against odds and hardships on their journey of escape into embracing their true love.

Ailin, the maid, has had a hard life, much different from that of Lala's. Her father raped her and flashbacks suggest she had his child. She then left Paraguay and moved to Argentina to get away. When she moved she was just a child and she her skin is darker than everyone else which makes her stand out. She also speaks a different language. When she works for Lala and her family, Lala's father tries to make her a part of the family. Lala's family also has sex with her which understandably causes a lot of anger with Lala.

== Reception ==
The Fish Child received mixed reviews. On Rotten Tomatoes it has a score of 83%. The film is described as an "upstairs-downstairs, lesbian love on-the-run thriller" by critics on Screendaily. Overall, this film is known for highlighting love, bringing attention to abuse, and demonstrating complex relationships. This film also highlights colorism because the maid Ailin experiences prejudice that Lala does not throughout the film.

== Cast ==
- Inés Efron - Lala
- Mariela Vitale - Ailín "La Guayi"
- Arnaldo André - Sócrates, Father of Ailín
- Ailín Salas - "La Guayi niňa"
- Pep Munné - El juez Bronté, Father of Lala
- Diego Velázquez - el Vasco
- Carlos Bardem - Comisario Pulido
- Julián Doregger - Nacho, Brother of Lala

== See also ==
- List of LGBT films directed by women
