= The Clan (2015 film) =

2015 film

- Film poster
- Spanish: El clan
- Directed by: Pablo Trapero
- Written by: Pablo Trapero
- Produced by: Hugo Sigman; Pedro Almodóvar; Agustín Almodóvar; Esther García; Matías Mosteirín; Axel Kuschevatzky
- Starring: Guillermo Francella; Peter Lanzani; Lili Popovich; Gastón Cocchiarale; Giselle Motta; Franco Masini; Antonia Bengoechea; Stefanía Koessl
- Cinematography: Julián Apezteguia
- Edited by: Alejandro Carrillo Penovi; Pablo Trapero
- Music by: Vicente D´Elía
- Production companies: K&S Films; Matanza Cine; El Deseo
- Distributed by: 20th Century Fox (Argentina); Warner Bros. Pictures (Spain)
- Release date: 13 August 2015
- Running time: 108 minutes
- Countries: Argentina; Spain
- Language: Spanish
- Box office: US$13.7 million

The Clan (Spanish: El clan) is a 2015 biographical crime film written and directed by Pablo Trapero and starring Guillermo Francella and Peter Lanzani. It was selected to be screened in the main competition section of the 72nd Venice International Film Festival, where director Pablo Trapero won the Silver Lion. The film was selected as the Argentine entry for the Best Foreign Language Film at the 88th Academy Awards but was not nominated.

== Plot ==
The story is based on the case of the Puccio family from Buenos Aires, who kidnapped four people—three of whom they murdered—in the 1980s.

The Puccios appear to be a typical middle-class family from the affluent neighborhood of San Isidro, with aspirations of moving up into the upper class.The family comprises Arquímedes Puccio, the family patriarch; Epifanía Puccio, his wife; their three sons, Alejandro, Daniel "Maguila", and Guillermo; and their two daughters, Silvia and Adriana.

At the end of the Falklands War in 1982, Arquímedes, a former state intelligence operative, turns to kidnapping wealthy people for ransom to maintain his financial status. Alejandro assists him by identifying potential victims among his friends and acquaintances.

The first victim is Ricardo Manoukian, Alejandro's friend and teammate. In order to prevent Ricardo from identifying the kidnappers, Arquímedes still kills him, even though the kidnapping succeeds. Although Alejandro was greatly concerned about this murder, he still agreed to remain silent under his father's pressure.

After the first crime, Arquímedes and Alejandro kidnap Eduardo Aulet, another of Alejandro's friends. Eduardo is also murdered, with the Aulet family having paid the ransom.

After the return to democracy in Argentina, imprisoned military officer Aníbal Gordon advises Arquímedes that the military will struggle to protect him under the new government. But Arquímedes does not heed the warning.

Guillermo tells his older brother, Alejandro, at the airport that he already knew about the family’s crimes. This led to his decision to leave this country, and he also advised Alejandro to leave. Afterwards, Alejandro refuses to join the kidnapping plot to kidnap businessman Emilio Naum. This kidnapping fails, and Naum is killed. This caused a serious conflict between Alejandro and his father.

To reconcile with his father, Alejandro convinces Maguila to return to Argentina and join their operations. In 1985, the group kidnaps businesswoman Nélida Bollini de Prado and keeps her prisoner in their basement. With ransom dealings falling through and growing public attention around this case, Arquímedes is informed that he was no longer under military protection.

In August 1985, Arquímedes and Maguila are arrested when they collect the ransom. Subsequently, police raided the Puccio home, secured Bollini de Prado’s release and arrested most of family members. This case drew great media attention, and this family gained the name of the “Puccio Clan”.

The prosecuting offers Arquímedes a deal: if Arquímedes confesses to being the mastermind behind the kidnappings, his family will not be indicted as accomplices. He refuses and claimes that his actions complied with higher military orders.

The film ends with a series of texts detailing the family's fate:

- Alejandro tries to kill himself by jumping from high ground when transported to court because he cannot bear this case's pressure. But he survived and served life imprisonment. After multiple suicide attempts, he eventually is released on parole and died of pneumonia in 2008.
- Maguila escaped from Argentina before trial. After his charges are dropped due to limitation periods, he returned to Argentina in 2013.
- Guillermo never faced charges arising from family members' crimes, and never returned to Argentina.
- Epifanía and Silvia were released for lack of evidence.
- Adriana is not face any charges and later returns to live with her mother.
- Arquímedes received a life sentence. However, he is released on parole in 2008 and works as a lawyer. a lawyer. He died in 2013.

== Cast ==
- Guillermo Francella as Arquímedes Puccio
- Peter Lanzani as Alejandro Puccio
- Lili Popovich as Epifanía Puccio
- Gastón Cocchiarale as Maguila Puccio
- Giselle Motta as Silvia Puccio
- Franco Masini as Guillermo Puccio
- Antonia Bengoechea as Adriana Puccio
- Stefanía Koessl as Mónica Sörvick
- Fernando Miró as Aníbal Gordon

== Production ==
Trapero initiated the idea of making a film about the Puccios. It was shot between late 2014 and early 2015. Due to the long period of production, the film missed the opportunity to participate in the Cannes festival.

Guillermo Manoukian and Rogelia Pozzi, relatives of the Puccios' victims, knew early on about Trapero's intention to shoot the film. They supported the project, as long as it was a serious film, and provided information about the case which was incorporated into the plot.

The film was produced by K&S Films, Matanza Cine and El Deseo in association with Telefe and Telefónica Studios.

== Reception ==
=== Box office ===
The film opened in Argentina on 13 August 2015, to generally positive reviews. It had the largest opening weekend of any Argentinean film in history, with a box office total of 32 million pesos and 505,000 tickets sold between its opening Thursday and that Sunday, representing 53% of all cinema-goers, seven times more than the second most viewed film, Ted 2. This surpassed the previous record, of the film Wild Tales (2014). According to BBC News, 1.5 million people saw the film in its first two weeks of release.

=== Critical response ===
The film was screened at the Venice Film Festival and Toronto International Film Festival in September 2015. Both Variety and The Hollywood Reporter singled out the arresting soundtrack in their reviews; Variety called the choice of music "among the film's most unnerving strategies, reminiscent of Spike Lee's Summer of Sam, in which celebratory pop tunes evoke the era even as they practically serve to encourage the horrors depicted onscreen"; The Hollywood Reporter noted that the "loud, upbeat songs ... provide a counterpoint ... [suggesting] how kidnapping became simply a part of life for the Puccios. It's never clearer than in a daring montage sequence that matches Mónica's cries of ecstasy during a bout of lovemaking with the cries for help of a kidnapping victim in the family's home. For these folks, there seems to be a mighty fine line between love and cruelty".

On the review aggregator website Rotten Tomatoes, 85% of 78 critics' reviews are positive, with an average rating of 7.3/10. The website's consensus reads: "As shockingly compelling as it is dispiriting, The Clan delivers hard-hitting lessons even for viewers unfamiliar with the real-life history behind its story." Metacritic, which uses a weighted average, assigned the film a score of 73 out of 100, based on 19 critics, indicating "generally favorable" reviews.

=== Awards ===
Year	Award	Category	Nominee(s)	Result	Ref.
2015	72nd Venice International Film Festival	Golden Lion	Pablo Trapero	Nominated	
2015	72nd Venice International Film Festival	Silver Lion	Pablo Trapero	Won	
2015	2015 Toronto International Film Festival	Platform section		Honorable mention	
2016	21st Forqué Awards	Best Film		Nominated	
2016	21st Forqué Awards	Best Latin-American Film		Nominated	
2016	21st Forqué Awards	Best Actor	Guillermo Francella	Nominated	
2016	30th Goya Awards	Best Ibero-American Film		Won	
2016	58th Ariel Awards	Best Ibero-American Film		Nominated	
2016	3rd Platino Awards	Best Ibero-American Film		Nominated	
2016	3rd Platino Awards	Best Director	Pablo Trapero	Nominated	
2016	3rd Platino Awards	Best Actor	Guillermo Francella	Won	
2016	3rd Platino Awards	Best Art Direction	Sebastián Orgambide	Nominated	
2016	3rd Platino Awards	Best Editing	Pablo Trapero, Alejandro Carrillo Penovi	Nominated	
2016	3rd Platino Awards	Best Sound	Vicente D'Elía, Leandro de Loredo	Nominated	

== Series ==
The film's success led to a 2015 TV mini-series also focused on the Puccio family, Historia de un clan, starring Alejandro Awada.

== See also ==
- List of Argentine submissions for the Academy Award for Best Foreign Language Film
- List of submissions to the 88th Academy Awards for Best Foreign Language Film
