= Tristán (actor) =

Argentine actor (1936–2023)

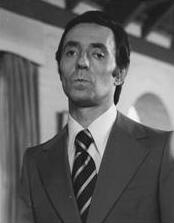
- Tristán in La guerra de los sostenes (1976)
- Born: Tristán Antonio Díaz Ocampo; 27 October 1936; Pergamino, Buenos Aires, Argentina
- Died: 25 March 2023 (aged 86); Córdoba, Argentina

Tristán Antonio Díaz Ocampo (27 October 1936 – 25 March 2023), known mononymously as Tristán, was an Argentine actor and comedian, whose career spanned over five decades.

== Life and career ==
Born in Pergamino, orphan of his father, Ocampo started working at the age of ten as a baker and then made a large number of low-paid jobs, including dishwasher, waiter, shop assistant, street vendor and door-to-door salesman. He started his career as a comedian in the late 1950s, in the radio show Farandulandia. He adopted his stage name as some of his relatives considered his artistic activity dishonourable. In 1960, he moved to Buenos Aires, where he had his breakout in the television show Telecómicos, and later became active in revue theater and films. Specialized in slapstick and physical stunts, in the mid-1980s he also had a one-man-show, Las travesuras de Tristán. After over two decades of large popularity, starting from the late 1980s the physical comedy went progressively out-of-fashion in Argentina and Tristán focused his activities on stage. In 2015, his career had an unexpected relaunch from the villain role of "El coronel" in the TV drama series Historia de un clan, which got him a Martín Fierro Award for best supporting actor. In 2018, he was accused by actress Rita Pauls, the daughter of writer Alan Pauls and a colleague in the series, of sexual harassment, an accusation he denied, describing it as a "looking for fame" attempt.

In December 2019 Tristán fell and broke his hip, never fully recovering. He died of bilateral pneumonia on 25 March 2023, at the age of 86.
