= Dante (film) =

- Directed by: Hugo Ruiz
- Written by: Hugo Ruiz
- Produced by: Kike Sánchez; Patricia González; Hugo Ruiz; Enrique Fernández
- Starring: Chino Darín; Ester Expósito; Vicente Romero; Enrique Arce; Asier Etxeandia
- Cinematography: Teo Delgado
- Edited by: Alberto del Campo
- Music by: Remate
- Production companies: Gilda Productions Films; El Sueño Eterno Pictures; Sissi Films; Jarana Films
- Distributed by: Eterno Films Distribution
- Release dates: 7 June 2026 (Tribeca); 6 November 2026 (Spain)
- Country: Spain
- Language: Spanish

Dante is a 2026 Spanish thriller film written and directed by Hugo Ruiz. It stars Chino Darín alongside Vicente Romero, Enrique Arce, and Ester Expósito.

== Plot ==
Set in Madrid at night, the plot follows Eduardo, a well-meaning paramedic responding to an emergency, who sees himself involved in a dispute between criminal leaders.

== Cast ==
- Chino Darín as Eduardo
- Vicente Romero as Santos
- Enrique Arce as Mario
- Ester Expósito as Mak
- Asier Etxeandia as Chemi

== Production ==
The project (originally known under the title Dante de noche; 'Dante at Night') was conceived as the second installment of a trilogy of films that take place in the same place (Madrid) on the same night, following One Night with Adela (2023). Director-screenwriter Hugo Ruiz pitched it as a cross between Quentin Tarantino's films and Eloy de la Iglesia's quinqui films. He also stated that the film has a bit of After Hours (1985) in it. Principal photography kicked off on 1 September 2025 in Madrid. Teo Delgado lensed the film, Alberto del Campo worked as film editor, and Remate scored the film.

== Release ==
Dante had its world premiere on 7 June 2026 in the 'Escape from Tribeca' genre slate of the 25th Tribeca Film Festival. It was also programmed at the 28th Abycine festival. It is scheduled to be released theatrically in Spain on 6 November 2026 by Eterno Films Distribution.

== Reception ==
Chad Collins of Dread Central rated the film 4 out of 5 stars, declaring it to be "an unflinching, seedy odyssey of crime, carnage, and desperation", otherwise only let down by the ending.

Daniel Kurland of Bloody Disgusting rated the film 3½ out of 5 skulls, describing the viewing as "a chaotic experience that's pumping adrenaline, burning rubber, and snorting drugs from frame one and then rarely lets up".

== See also ==
- List of Spanish films of 2026
