= Night Rain =

2022 film directed by Jeanne Marie Spicuzza and Synthian Sharp

- Directed by: Jeanne Marie Spicuzza; Synthian Sharp
- Written by: Jeanne Marie Spicuzza
- Produced by: Jeanne Marie Spicuzza
- Starring: Adam Lesar; Clarissa Thibeaux; Thessa M'loe; Mattia Chicco; Heidi Honeycutt; Jeanne Marie Spicuzza; Amaya Isabella Spicuzza
- Cinematography: Jay Lopez
- Edited by: Synthian Sharp
- Music by: Guy Hoffman; Jeanne Marie Spicuzza
- Production companies: Seasons and a Muse Studios
- Distributed by: First Focus International
- Release date: 2022
- Running time: 118 minutes
- Country: United States
- Language: English

Night Rain is a 2022 American crime mystery thriller film written, directed and produced by Jeanne Marie Spicuzza, and co-directed by Synthian Sharp.

== Plot ==
An unsuspecting actress takes on a role in a low-budget period drama about a notorious unsolved Los Angeles murder. However, she soon realizes that her stalker is the one behind the camera, using the film as a twisted means to make her and her fellow young filmmakers the targets of a real-life horror story.

== Cast ==
- Jeanne Marie Spicuzza as Ava
- Adam Lesar as Ezra
- Clarissa Thibeaux as Nefreri
- Thessa M'loe as Thomasina
- Mattia Chicco as Vittorio
- Heidi Honeycutt as Lieutenant Ruth
- Amaya Isabella Spicuzza as Amaya
- Scott Javore as Alan
- James Forbis as Bony Knuckles

== Release ==
The film premiered virtually at LA Femme International Film Festival and theatrically at the prestigious Martha's Vineyard Film Society, Women in Film Festival. Night Rain is streaming exclusively at The Studio Club membership platform from Seasons & a Muse Studios.

== Accolades ==
Year	Award	Category	Recipient(s)	Result	Ref.
2021	Beyond the Curve International Film Festival	Best Narrative Feature	Jeanne Marie Spicuzza	Won	
