= Volley (film) =

- Film poster
- Directed by: Martín Piroyansky
- Written by: Martín Piroyansky
- Produced by: Lautaro Brunatti; Antonio Balseiro
- Starring: Martín Piroyansky; Violeta Urtizberea; Inés Efron; Chino Darín; Vera Spinetta; Justina Bustos
- Music by: Nicolás Sorín
- Release dates: November 2014 (Mar del Plata); 12 March 2015
- Running time: 95 minutes
- Country: Argentina
- Language: Spanish

Volley (Spanish: Voley) is a 2014 Argentine comedy film written and directed by Martín Piroyansky. The cast is composed of Piroyansky, Violeta Urtizberea, Inés Efron, Chino Darín, Vera Spinetta and Justina Bustos.

== Plot ==
Nicolás (Martín Piroyansky), Pilar (Inés Efron), Catalina (Vera Spinetta), Manuela (Violeta Urtizberea) and Nacho (Chino Darín) are friends since they were teenagers. Around their thirties they are still united, although with more differences than meeting points. Nico proposes to celebrate New Year's night at the Tigre family home and spend a few days on vacation. Without consulting, Manuela invites Belén (Justina Bustos), her childhood friend.

== Cast ==
- Martín Piroyansky as Nicolás
- Violeta Urtizberea as Manuela
- Inés Efron as Pilar
- Chino Darín as Ignacio "Nacho"
- Justina Bustos as Belén
- Vera Spinetta as Catalina
