= The Whore and the Whale =

La puta y la ballena
- Directed by: Luis Puenzo
- Written by: Ángeles González Sinde, Lucía Puenzo
- Release date: 1 April 2004
- Running time: 120 minutes
- Countries: Argentina; Spain
- Language: Spanish

The Whore and the Whale (La puta y la ballena) is a 2004 Hispano-Argentine drama film directed by Luis Puenzo. The film tells the interwoven stories of a Spanish writer whose life goes through various crises and an Argentine photographer who rescued a prostitute from a brothel in the far south of Patagonia but lost her and then died in the Spanish Civil War.

== Plot ==
Vera, a writer in present-day Spain, is commissioned to write a book about Emilio, an Argentine photographer who was killed in the fighting in Barcelona in 1939. She feels lost, unable to live with her husband and young son and suspecting she is ill. To find out more about Emilio, on an impulse she flies alone to Buenos Aires, where she is hospitalised and undergoes a mastectomy. Dying in the bed next to her is a very old woman called Matilde, who is visited by her divorced grandson Ernesto.

He takes the recovering Vera to clear out his grandmother's house, where it emerges that the young Matilde had been a whore in the same establishment as Lola, a Spanish chorus girl who had sunk into prostitution in a remote town in Patagonia. Ernesto takes Vera to the town, where his father reveals that it was the photographer Emilio who in 1934 bought Lola's freedom from Suárez, a blind composer of tangos. When the two boarded an aircraft to leave, Lola could not face the future and threw herself out over the sea, falling to her death beside a whale with a harpoon wound. When Vera and Ernesto visit the spot, they see the same whale, now very old, recognisable by the same wound.

== Cast ==
- Aitana Sánchez-Gijón ... Vera
- Leonardo Sbaraglia... Emilio
- Mercè Llorens ... Lola
- Eduardo Nutkiewitz ... Ernesto (as Edward Nutkiewicz)
- Lydia Lamaison ... Matilde when old
- Belén Blanco ... Matilde when young
- Pep Munné ... Jordi
- Martín Caloni ... Juanito
- Pompeyo Audivert ... El Gringo Orestes
- Miguel Ángel Solá ... Suárez
- Nicolás Tognola ... El Pibe Pedro
- Natalia Otero ... Prostitute
- Carola Reyna ... Meme
- Óscar Guzmán ... Urondo
- Nina Krakoff ... Prostitute
