= Cromo =

- Genre: Drama
- Created by: Lucía Puenzo; Nicolás Puenzo
- Starring: Emilia Attías; Guillermo Pfening; German Palacios
- Country of origin: Argentina
- Original language: Spanish
- No. of seasons: 1
- No. of episodes: 12

Original release
- Network: TV Pública

Cromo is an Argentine television drama, an eco-crime series which premiered in the fall of 2015 on TV Pública.

== Synopsis ==
Created by Lucía Puenzo, Nicolás Puenzo and Pablo Fendrik, the series stars Guillermo Pfening and German Palacios as Diego and Simon, research scientists investigating the murder of Diego's wife, Valentina (Emilia Attías), while she was investigating an environmental disaster in Corrientes. The script was written under the watch of a group of CONICET investigators, and it is based on actual events.

== Production ==
It was filmed on location in Antarctica (Marambio Base), Esteros del Iberá, Corrientes, and Patagonia.

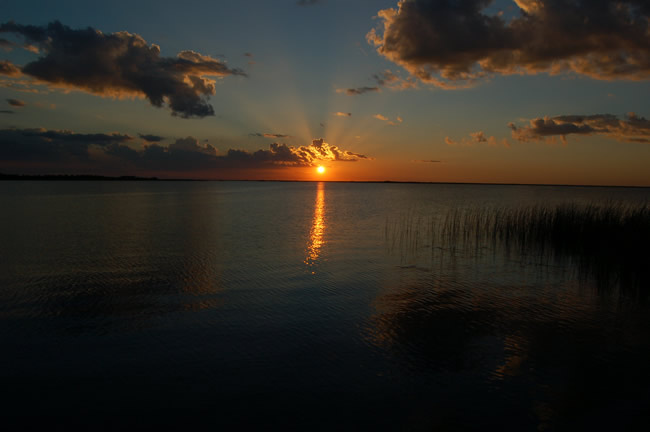
Esteros del Iberá wetlands

== Screenings and reception ==
In advance of the series premiere, three episodes received a preview screening at the 2015 Toronto International Film Festival, as part of the festival's new Primetime platform of selected television projects. The series secured several international distribution deals after its screening at TIFF, as well as a deal to expand the series into a feature film.

It also had a positive reception at the Series Mania festival in Paris 2016
