= La embajada =

Spanish period drama television series

- Genre: Political thriller
- Created by: Ramón Campos; Gema R. Neira
- Directed by: Eduardo Chapero-Jackson; Carlos Sedes
- Country of origin: Spain
- Original language: Spanish
- No. of seasons: 1
- No. of episodes: 11

Production
- Production company: Bambú Producciones

Original release
- Network: Antena 3
- Release: 25 April – 11 July 2016

La embajada (transl. 'The Embassy') is a Spanish political thriller television series created by Ramón Campos and Gema R. Neira. Starring, among others, Belén Rueda, Abel Folk, Raúl Arévalo, Úrsula Corberó, Chino Darín, Amaia Salamanca, Maxi Iglesias, Megan Montaner, Alicia Borrachero and Tristán Ulloa, the plot concerns a political intrigue of corruption happening in the Spanish Embassy in Thailand.

== Premise ==
Set in the Spanish Embassy in Bangkok, the plot tracks the events unraveling in the diplomatic mission after the arrival of the new ambassador Luis Salinas (Abel Folk) and his wife Claudia Cernuda (Belén Rueda), that would end up with the imprisonment of the former a year later on charges of money laundering, embezzlement and influence peddling, including the legal problems of the ambassador's daughter Ester (Úrsula Corberó) with drug possession, the love affair of Claudia with her daughter's boyfriend Carlos (Chino Darín), or the demand for kick-backs for the construction of a high speed train line. Claudia starts assembling the parts concerning what happened by testifying at the trial.

== Cast ==
- Abel Folk as Luis Salinas, the Ambassador.
- Belén Rueda as Claudia Cernuda, the Ambassador's wife.
- Raúl Arévalo as Eduardo Marañón, the Minister-Counselor.
- Úrsula Corberó as Ester Salinas Cernuda, Luis and Claudia's daughter.
- Chino Darín as Carlos Guillén, Ester's boyfriend.
- Maxi Iglesias as Roberto Marañón, Eduardo's younger brother.
- Amaia Salamanca as Fátima, Eduardo's wife.
- Tristán Ulloa as Bernardo, the Embassy's Consul.
- Alicia Borrachero as Olga, Bernardo's wife.
- Carlos Bardem as Paco Cadenas, a businessman.
- David Verdaguer as Romero, a journalist.
- Melani Olivares as Patricia, commercial attaché at the Embassy.
- Megan Montaner as Sara, Secretary at the Embassy.
- Pedro Alonso as Villar, the Embassy's security manager.
- Ana Gracia as Elena, the chancellor.

== Production and release ==
Created by Ramón Campos and Gema R. Neira, La embajada was produced by Bambú Producciones for Atresmedia. Filming started in December 2015. All filming involving actors took place in the Madrid region during Winter (including Alcobendas), featuring heavy green screen usage. The background shots were separatedly filmed in Thailand and layered with the close-up shots via chroma keying. The episodes were directed by Carlos Sedes and Eduardo Chapero-Jackson, whereas the scriptwriting team was coordinated by Carlos López. The series premiered on 25 April 2016 on Antena 3, obtaining a "promising" 22.5% audience share in the first episode. The broadcasting run of the 11-episode season ended on 11 July 2016. Pending the airing of the season finale, Atresmedia had announced that there would be no renovation for a second season.

Series	Episodes	Originally released		Average viewership	Share (%)	Ref.
Series	Episodes	First released	Last released	Average viewership	Share (%)	Ref.
1	11	25 April 2016	11 July 2016	2,733,000	15.9	

This is a caption
No. in season	Title	Viewers	Original release date	Share (%)
1	"La mano en el fuego"	4,034,000	25 April 2016	22.5
2	"Todo tiene un precio"	3,243,000	2 May 2016	18.0
3	"Tolerancia cero"	3,030,000	9 May 2016	16.9
4	"Defina corrupción"	2,925,000	16 May 2016	16.2
5	"Dinero público"	2,802,000	23 May 2016	15.4
6	"Diecisiete cuentas en el paraíso"	2,763,000	30 May 2016	16.0
7	"La filtración"	2,664,000	6 June 2016	15.1
8	"Lluvia de millones"	2,429,000	20 June 2016	14.5
9	"Todo está grabado"	2,127,000	27 June 2016	13.6
10	"No lo recuerdo, Señoría"	2,006,000	4 July 2016	13.4
11	"Quid pro quo"	2,038,000	11 July 2016	14.3

== Awards and nominations ==
Year	Award	Category	Nominee(s)	Result	Ref.
2016	4th MiM Series Awards	Best Screenplay		Nominated	
2017	26th Actors and Actresses Union Awards	Best Television Actor in a Secondary Role	Raúl Arévalo	Nominated	
2017	26th Actors and Actresses Union Awards	Best Television Actress in a Secondary Role	Alicia Borrachero	Nominated	
2017	26th Actors and Actresses Union Awards	Best Television Actor in a Minor Role	Carlos Bardem	Nominated	
