= Javier Drolas =

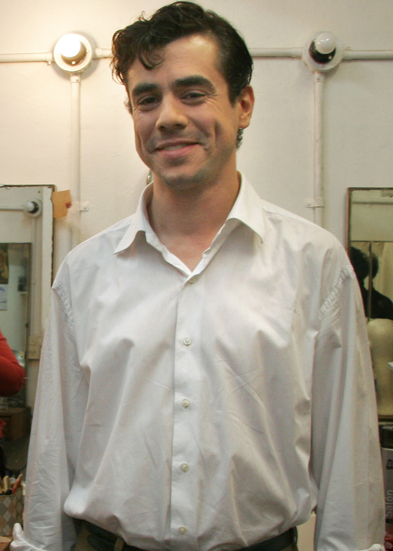
- Born: April 3, 1972 (age 54); Argentina
- Occupations: Actor and composer
- Years active: 2001-present
- Awards: Silver Condor Award for Best Actor in 2020 for Las Buenas Intenciones

Javier Drolas (born April 3, 1972) is an Argentinian actor and composer.

== Education ==
He studied visual arts at the Escuela Nacional de Bellas Artes Prilidiano Pueyrredón and at the Escuela Municipal de la Joya. He also studied text production and staging with Rafael Spregelburd.

== Filmography ==
=== Film ===
Year	Title	Role	Notes
2001	Violeta		Short film
2003	Lo nuestro no funciona		Also composer
2005	Sidewalls	Him	Short film
2007	Amor autoadhesivo	Hombre	Short film
2010	El mural	Juan Carlos Castagnino	
2011	Sidewalls	Martín	
2012	Los planetas		
2014	En las nubes	Alejandro	Short film
2014	Inmentis		Short film
2014	Luna en Leo	Marcos	
2015	Cómo ganar enemigos	Max Abadi	
2016	Me estás matando, Susana	Chileno	
2016	Gilda, no me arrepiento de este amor	Toti Giménez	
2017	Severina	R	
2017	Superdulce	Alejandro	Short film
2018	El padre de mis hijos	Gastón	
2018	Camino sinuoso	Diego Perechodnik	
2019	Las buenas intenciones	Gustavo	
2019	Los que vuelven	Padre Ignacio	
2019	Lejos de Pekin	Daniel	
2019	Rosita	Víctor	
2020	El público		
2020	El libro de los placeres	Ulisses	
2021	La estrella roja	Hilel Schwartz	
2021	Bahía Blanca	Ernesto Sidi	
2022	Sublime	Padre de Manuel	
2022	Legítima defensa	Ramiro Sartori	

=== Television ===
Year	Title	Role	Notes
2011	Gigantes	Juan	Episode: «Felicitas Guerrero»
2012	Tiempos compulsivos	Ernesto	
2013	A menina sem qualidades	Tristán	
2013	Jorge	Ludovico Marra	
2014	La celebración	Javito	Episode: «Boda»
2015	El mal menor	Alfonso	Episode: «Julieta»
2015	Conflictos modernos	Alejandro	Episode: «Telecomunicaciones»
2015	Variaciones Walsh	Policía Carrizo	Episode: «Los dos montones de tierra»
2016	Conflictos modernos	Federico	Episode: «Un gran favor»
2016	Los ricos no piden permiso	Felipe Cardozo	
2017	En viaje	Trelles	Episode: «Fobia – Parte 2»
2019	Zielfahnder, Blutiger Tango	Rossmann	TV movie
2021	Pequeñas Victorias	Nicolás	Episode: «Estoy fuera»
2021	Días de gallos	Pedro Quinteros	Episode: «El regreso»
2023	Ringo, gloria y muerte	Tito Lectoure	
2024	Cromañón	Juan Carlos	

== Theater ==
Play	Director	Place
Bloqueo y Lucido	Rafael Spregelburd	
Bizarra	Rafael Spregelburd	Centro Cultural Ricardo Rojas
Reproches constantes	Santiago Gobernori	
Algo descarriló	Santiago Gobernori	
Poses para dormir	Lola Arias	
Veladas temáticas	Compañía teatral "Mondo Pasta"	
Infortunados ojos	Laura Mantel	Callejón de los deseos
Ser el amo	Fernanda García Lao	Sportivo Teatral
La movilidad de las cosas terrenas	Analía Couceyro	Sportivo Teatral
El balcón	Raúl Mereniuk	Callejón de los Deseos
Ivonne		Sportivo Teatral

== Awards and nominations ==
Year	Organization	Category	Work	Result	Ref(s)
2016	Premios Sur	Best supporting actor	Gilda, no me arrepiento de este amor	Nominated	
2017	Premios Cóndor de Plata	Best supporting actor	Gilda, no me arrepiento de este amor	Nominated	
2020	Premios Cóndor de Plata	Best actor	Las buenas intenciones	Won	
