= Iron Reign =

Spanish crime thriller television series

- Spanish: Mano de hierro
- Written by: Lluís Quílez; Arturo Ruiz Serrano; Daniel Corpas; Asier Guerricaechevarría
- Directed by: Lluís Quílez
- Starring: Eduard Fernández; Chino Darín; Jaime Lorente; Natalia de Molina; Sergi López; Enric Auquer
- Country of origin: Spain
- Original language: Spanish
- No. of seasons: 1
- No. of episodes: 8

Production
- Production company: The Mediapro Studio

Original release
- Network: Netflix
- Release: 15 March 2024 – present

Iron Reign (Spanish: Mano de hierro) is a Spanish crime thriller television series. It stars Eduard Fernández, Chino Darín, Jaime Lorente, Natalia de Molina, Sergi López, and Enric Auquer.

== Plot ==
Set in the Port of Barcelona, the plot follows the control exercised over illegal cargo by the owner of the port's main terminal, Joaquín Manchado, and a gang war that ensues after an accident and the loss of a stash of cocaine.

== Cast ==
- Eduard Fernández as Joaquín Manchado
- Chino Darín as Víctor
- Jaime Lorente as Néstor
- Natalia de Molina as Rocío
- Sergi López as Román
- Enric Auquer as Ricardo
- Daniel Grao
- Raúl Briones
- Salva Reina
- Giannina Fruttero
- Cosimo Fusco
- Ana Torrent
- Roberto Mateos
- Melina Matthews

== Production ==
Iron Reign is a The Mediapro Studio production for Netflix. It was written by Lluís Quílez alongside Arturo Ruiz Serrano, Daniel Corpas, and Asier Guerricaechevarría.

== Episode list ==
No.	Title	Directed by	Written by	Original release date
1	"The Law of the Port" (La ley del puerto)	Lluís Quílez	Lluís Quílez, Arturo Ruiz Serrano	15 March 2024
2	"Long Live the King" (Larga vida al rey)	Lluís Quílez	Lluís Quílez, Arturo Ruiz Serrano	15 March 2024
3	"Throne of Blood" (Trono de sangre)	Lluís Quílez	Lluís Quílez, Asier Guerricaechevarría	15 March 2024
4	"Double or Nothing" (Doble o nada)	Lluís Quílez	Lluís Quílez, Daniel Corpas	15 March 2024
5	"An Eye for an Eye, a Tooth for a Tooth" (Ojo por ojo, diente por diente)	Lluís Quílez	Lluís Quílez, Daniel Corpas	15 March 2024
6	"A Bad Omen" (Un mal presagio)	Lluís Quílez	Lluís Quílez, Daniel Corpas	15 March 2024
7	"Crossroads" (Cruce de caminos)	Lluís Quílez	Lluís Quílez, Daniel Corpas, Arturo Ruiz Serrano	15 March 2024
8	"A Matter of Blood" (Cuestión de sangre)	Lluís Quílez	Lluís Quílez, Arturo Ruiz Serrano	15 March 2024

== Release ==
The 8-episode series had its debut on Netflix on 15 March 2024.
