= Gustavo Taretto =

- Born: December 5, 1965 (age 60); Buenos Aires (Argentina)
- Occupations: Film director, screenwriter and producer
- Years active: 2002-present
- Notable work: Sidewalls

Gustavo Taretto (born December 5, 1965 in Buenos Aires) is an Argentinian film director, screenwriter and producer. He is best known for the 2005 short film Sidewalls (Spanish: Medianeras), for which he won numerous awards, including best short film at the Mar del Plata International Film Festival, and for the 2011 feature film of the same name, based on the previous short film. For the 2007 short film Hoy no estoy, released at the Locarno Film Festival, he received the award for best short film.

== Filmography ==
As a director and screenwriter

- Las insoladas (2002 short film)
- Cien pesos (2003 short film)
- Medianeras (2005 short film)
- Hoy no estoy (2007 short film)
- 25 miradas, 200 minutos (2010 TV show, 1 episode)
- Una vez más (short film, 2010)
- Medianeras (2011)
- Sucesos intervenidos (2014)
- Las insoladas (2014)
- Amsterdam (2022)
