= Lucía Puenzo =

Argentine writer and film director (born 1976)

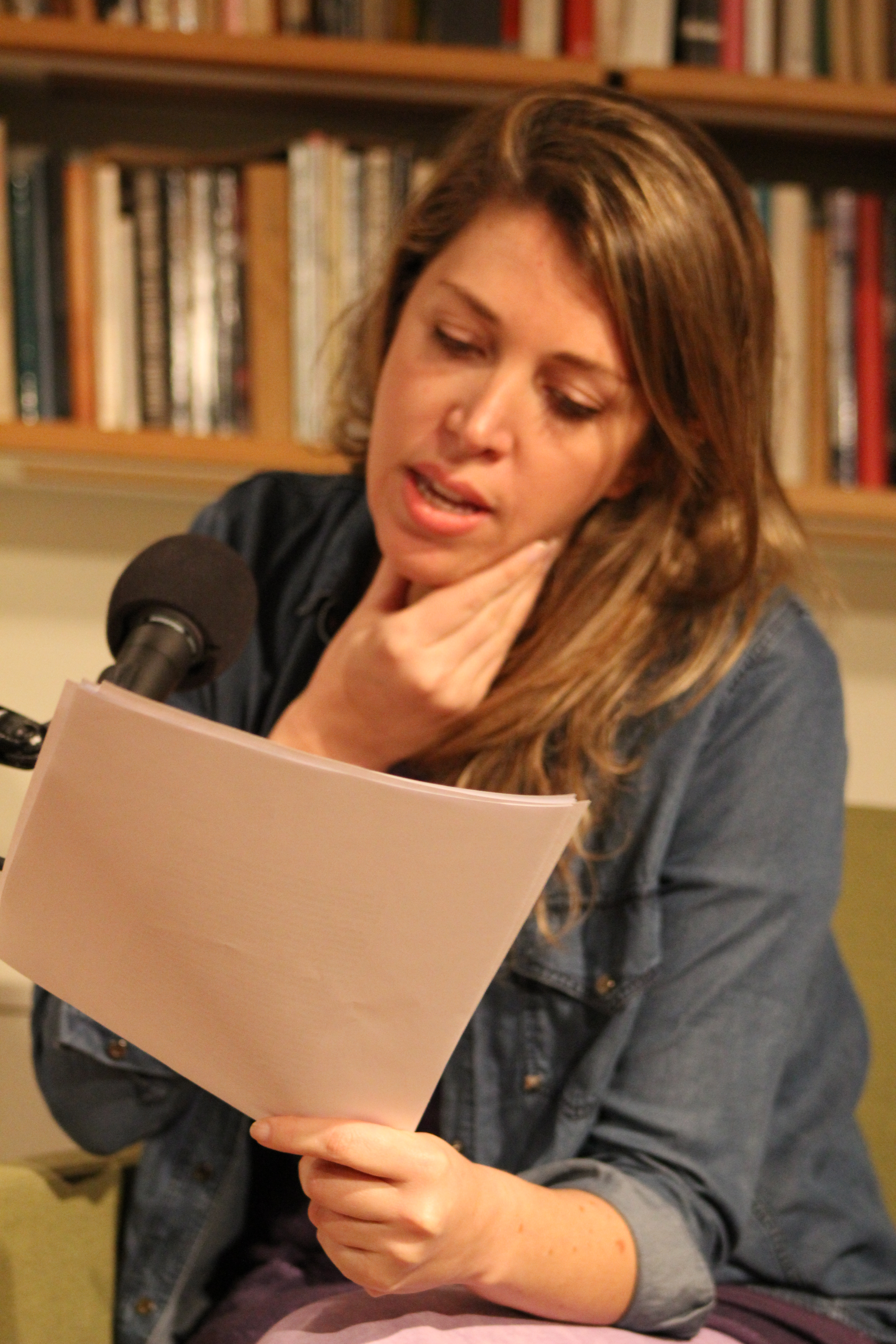
- Puenzo in 2013
- Born: 28 November 1976 (age 49); Buenos Aires, Argentina
- Education: University of Buenos Aires ENERC
- Occupations: Author; director
- Parent: Luis Puenzo

Lucía Puenzo (born 28 November 1976, Buenos Aires) is an Argentine author, screenwriter and film director. She is the daughter of the Oscar-winning film director, producer, and screenplay writer, Luis Puenzo.

== Early life ==
Puenzo studied literature at the University of Buenos Aires and proceeded to attend the ENERC, film school of the National Film Institute from Argentina (INCAA), where she graduated. She has done work with feature films, documentary films and mini series.

== Career ==
Puenzo began her career in the film industry as a screenwriter; her first work being The Whore and the Whale (2002). She also wrote the screenplay for the film Through Your Eyes (2007), which was based on the short story "Cinismo", by the Argentine writer Sergio Bizzio. Within the same year, Puenzo made her debut as a director with the film, XXY (2007).

In much of her work, Puenzo focuses on childhood and adolescence. Most of these pieces feature either queer or intersex characters. She frames these stories through the innocence of a child's gaze. Through this practice, she attempts to resist heteronormative models of development.

In an interview with Elle magazine, Puenzo discusses her interest in Nazism. A common theme in her work, is the fascination with modulating the human body, much like how Hitler attempted to modulate a whole race. In the work that she creates, writes and directs, such as XXY and The German Doctor, she focuses on the question of medically modified bodies. She shows the ethical dilemma with modern medicine and the creation of what a "perfect body" should conform to. With her work, Puenzo addresses the fact that society keeps on pushing towards standardization. She finds there is a delicate line between the good of medicine and what is unnecessary. By addressing different stories that sway back and forth across the line, she explores the limits of medicine.

As a director, she is strongly influenced by silent films. Although her work features sound, she makes an effort to not solely rely on dialogue if a scene can be told with a look.

On top of directing and screenwriting, Puenzo also has written several novels including El Niño Pez and Nueve Minutos. She creates films from many of her novels. She has stated that the two novels were not written with film adaptation in mind, and instead adaptation began years later. El Niño Pez did not begin to be adapted until XXY was in the editing stage. Additionally, Puenzo was featured in issue 113 of Granta Magazine, The Best of Young Spanish-Language Novelists.

== Filmography ==
- Historias cotidianas (2000) - Screenplay
- The Whore and the Whale (2004) - Screenplay
- Los invisibles (2005)
- A través de tus ojos (2006)
- Through Your Eyes (2007) - Screenplay
- XXY (2007) - Director, Screenplay
- The Fish Child (2009) - Director, Screenplay
- The German Doctor (2013) - Director, Screenplay
- Cromo (2015) - TV series
- Pepita the Gunslinger (2026)

== Awards and nominations ==
- XXY (2007) - 2008 Argentine Film Critics Association Awards and 2008 2008 Goya award
- The German Doctor - 2nd Unasur Cine International Film Festival - Best Director and

35th International Festival of New Latin American Cinema

== See also ==
- List of female film and television directors
- List of LGBT-related films directed by women
