= Arquímedes Puccio =

Argentine gang leader and serial killer

- Born: 14 September 1929; Buenos Aires, Argentina
- Died: 4 May 2013 (aged 83); General Pico, La Pampa
- Known for: Being part of a criminal clan responsible for committing a series of killings in 1982–1985

Arquímedes Rafael Puccio (14 September 1929 in Barracas, Buenos Aires – 4 May 2013 in General Pico, La Pampa) nicknamed "The crazy sweeper (in Spanish: El loco de la escoba)" was an Argentine accountant, lawyer, entrepreneur, SIDE member and member of the Argentine Anticommunist Alliance, he also led the Batallón de Inteligencia 601 and participated in the Tacuara nacionalist movement. He was mainly known for being the leader of the Puccio Clan, a criminal organization famous for abducting and murdering three entrepreneurs: Ricardo Manoukian, Eduardo Aulet and Emilio Naum. He was captured along with other clan members while trying to collect the ransom for their fourth victim, the funerary establishment owner and entrepreneur Nélida Bollini de Prado.

Arquimedes had five children: Alejandro, player of the Argentina national rugby union team, Silvia, Daniel (Maguila), Guillermo and Adriana. He also collaborated with his former workmates: retired colonel Rodolfo Victoriano Franco, Guillermo Fernández Laborda, Gustavo Contepomi, Roberto Díaz.

== Biography ==
Arquimedes was born on 14 September 1929 in a Buenos Aires neighbourhood, Barracas. He was the oldest of six brothers. He had four brothers and one sister: Salvador, César, Rómulo, Augusto, and Beatriz. His father was Juan Puccio, Chancellor's press officer of Juan Atilio Bramuglia. His mother was Isabel Ordano, a relatively well-known painter.

He got married in Buenos Aires on 5 October 1957 with an accounting and mathematics professor Epifanía Ángeles Calvo, also born Buenos Aires on 5 August 1932 with whom he had five children: Alejandro Rafael in 1958, Silvia Inés in 1960, Daniel Arquímedes en 1961, Guillermo J. in 1963 and Adriana Claudia, the youngest, was born on 20 March 1970. Epifanía worked as professor era at the School María Auxiliadora. Shortly they bought a house in the wealthy neighbourhood of San Isidro, which also be the same house where the victims were held captive.

Puccio graduated from the commercial school of Hipólito Vieytes of Buenos Aires and got a degree in accounting from the School of Economic Sciences. Between 1957 y 1964 he worked as a diplomat in the Ministry of Foreign Affairs and Worships. Argentine president Juan Domingo Perón bestowed his diploma because he achieved the merit of being the youngest diplomat at the time. Carried out diplomatic mail missions in Madrid. In 1973, he attended the Escuela Superior de Conducción Política, which depended on the Movimiento Nacional Justicialista (National Justicialist Movement). During that time, he was appointed Undersecretary of Sports of the Municipality of Buenos Aires. It is in this school where he meets his future accomplice, Guillermo Luis Fernandez Laborda, who worked as an administrator at the Ramos Mejia Hospital.

Puccio and Laborda became members of the Air Force Intelligence Service.

On June 20, 1973, Puccio, Laborda, Díaz and Franco met in Ezeiza on the day of Perón's definitive return to Argentina.

Puccio was part of the Batallón de Inteligencia 601 (601 Intelligence Battalion), a special intelligence unit of the Argentine Army, which was famous for its active participation in Dirty War and Operation Condor. During the dictatorship known as the National Reorganization Process that governed the country from 1976 to 1983, there were numerous cases of extortive kidnappings perpetrated by police or members of the army.

=== The Puccio Clan ===
El clan was made up as a limited company (anonymous society) who was the house owner. The clan was formed by Arquímedes Puccio, Fernández Laborda, colonel Franco, Puccio's children, and as trustee, the accountant Revuelta, who was not arrested for lack of evidence. Revuelta was also the accountant for the Gotelli family, one of whom had also been kidnapped.

The clan appeared to be an ordinary family. None of their acquaintances suspected them. In addition to the four known kidnappings, the police at the time suspected that the clan was related to other kidnappings that had taken place a few years earlier. Puccio had been accused of kidnapping a businessman from Bonafide, Enrique Pels, in 1973. The clan planned to kidnap about ten people, according to a list written on a piece of paper the police found when they raided the Puccio house when the clan was dismantled.

In 1982 Laborda and Puccio met again at Customs, where Laborda was a commission agent, and Puccio commented on his plan to carry out extortive kidnappings.

The clan's first victim was Ricardo Manoukian, 24, Manoukian was kidnapped on 22 July 1982. His car was designed to prevent kidnappings and Manoukian was also trained to avoid abductions. This was because of an episode 8 years previous to his kidnap, in which his uncle was kidnapped and stabbed to death by another criminal organization (presumably a group of corrupt police officers). However, he got cheated because he had a relationship with Alejandro, one of the involved in the Clan He was held captive for 11 days, bound hand and foot and hooded in the bathtub on the first floor, with the bathroom's curtain closed. His family, owner of the supermarket chain Tanti, paid a rescue fee of US$250,000 ($663,582.90 as of 2019). Even though his family paid for the freedom of his son, Manoukian was murdered on 30 July 1982, being shot three times in the head. His corpse was thrown away in a river close to Escobar. His remains were found months later in Benavídez.

On 5 May 1983 the clan kidnapped Eduardo Aulet, an industrial engineer and Rugby player in the Pueyrredón Club. Shortly before his kidnapping, he married Rogelia Pozzi. Autlet, was captured while driving to work. Gustavo Contepomi whistleblowed Autlet to Arquimedes, Contepomi was the couple of María Esther Aubone, mother of the wife of Florencio Aulet, Eduardo's father The family paid $150,000 for his liberation, but Aulet was murdered General Rodríguez even before the family paid for the rescue fee. His whereabouts remained unknown until his corpse was found years later, in 1987.

The clan's third victim was the entrepreneur, Emilio Naum, aged 38, who, along with his wife, owned the McTaylor store chain. On 22 June 1984, They created a plan that consisted in Puccio, who already met his victim, to stop him while Naum was driving in his car, so he could get closer to the Puccio's house, to ease the kidnapping. But at the moment of carrying out the crime, Naum resisted even though he had two men trying to reduce him. So one of them, who was holding a gun, accidentally shot him in the chest, killing him instantly. As they knew they couldn't stay there for long because they would be discovered shortly. They escaped from the crime scene, leaving the corpse.

=== Arrest ===
On 23 August 1985, the police broke into the Puccios' house. When they had already kidnapped their fourth and last victim, Nélida Bollini de Prado, aged 58, who had been held captive for one month. Before the discovery, authorities had already been suspicious about the family (without knowing their responsibility in the three previous crimes). At the moment of the intervention of the Argentine police, Alejandro was with his girlfriend. The couple along with the clan's other members, who were about to collect the ransom, were arrested.

The women, the mother, the daughters and Alejandro's girlfriend denied knowing everything, but the judge in the case, María Servini de Cubría, was struck by the fact that none of them were surprised or asked what had happened. According to the judge, the only one who could not be held responsible was the younger daughter, but the rest could not ignore it. According to the psychologists who took care of her, the girl knew what was happening but she was not old enough to understand the facts.

== Sentencing and liberation ==
Puccio never admitted any participation in the crimes but always claimed to be a patriot and the victim of political persecution. In December 1985 Puccio was sentenced to life imprisonment. During that period he converted to Envangelicalism and finished the coursework towards a law degree.

In April 2008, he received conditional liberty, after being imprisoned for 23 years and 8 months, due to the approval of the 2x1 law. Arquímedes Puccio was taken to the Instituto Correccional Abierto de General Pico La Pampa, after having his house arrest revoked, as he had infringed its conditions. There, in General Pico he obtained a new parole, so he continued to live there, where he worked as a lawyer, after obtaining a law degree in La Pampa. Shortly after, he moved to an evangelical priest house and after cohabiting with a younger woman, he moved to a retirement center, where spent his last years.

== Final years and death ==
Arquímedes Puccio died on 4 May 2013 in General Pico at age 83 due to a complications from a stroke. He is buried in a common grave.

== Arquimedes Puccio in the popular culture ==
The Argentinian film director, Pablo Trapero directed a movie called El Clan based on the criminal story of the Puccio family. The movie was protagonized by Guillermo Francella who portrays Arquimedes and Juan Pedro Lanzani, it was released on 13 August 2015 in Argentina and it was the highest-grossing movie of 2015 in the country. While mostly true to the facts, the movie has some inaccuracies, Daniel "Maguila" is not shown from the beginning of the movie when he participated, in all kidnappings.

In 2015, a series consisting of 11 chapters, called Historia de un clan, was broadcast in Telefé.
