= Jeanne Marie Spicuzza =

Filmmaker and actress

- Born: June 21, 1969 (age 56); Wisconsin, United States
- Occupations: Director, writer, actress, producer, herbalist
- Spouse: Guy Hoffman

Jeanne Marie Spicuzza is an American actress, director and writer. She is best known for her work on the films Night Rain, The Scarapist and Field Day.

== Life and career ==
Spicuzza was born in Milwaukee, Wisconsin to educators Robert and Marianne. She earned a Bachelor of Arts degree in philosophy and psychology from the University of Wisconsin–Milwaukee and a Masters in philosophy and herbalism. Her first screenplay, Breath of God, was a semifinalist in the Academy of Motion Picture Arts and Sciences' Nicholl Fellowships in Screenwriting. Her short film Field Day screened at the Portobello Film Festival. In 2005, she published Beautiful Terrible & True.

In 2015, her directorial debut feature film, The Scarapist, won Best Picture at the Verein Deutscher Kritiker Und Filmemacher (VDKUF).

== Filmography ==
Year	Film	Actor	Writer	Director	Producer	Notes
2022	Night Rain	✓	✓	✓	✓	Feature film
2015	The Scarapist	✓	✓	✓	✓	Feature film
2004	Field Day	✓	✓	✗	✓	Short film
2000	Labors	✓	✓	✗	✓	Short film
2000	Providence	✓	✗	✗	✗	TV series
1999	Jackie's Back!	✓	✗	✗	✗	TV film
1999	Naked	✗	✓	✗	✓	Documentary

== Bibliography ==
- For Beautiful Children Like You (2010)
- My Italia (2008)
- Beautiful Terrible & True (2005)
