= Sidewalls =

2011 film by Gustavo Taretto

- Theatrical release poster
- Spanish: Medianeras
- Directed by: Gustavo Taretto
- Written by: Gustavo Taretto
- Produced by: Natacha Cervi; Hernán Musaluppi; Christoph Friedel; Lluís Miñarro; Luis Sartor
- Starring: Pilar López de Ayala; Javier Drolas; Inés Efron; Rafael Ferro; Carla Peterson; Adrián Navarro
- Cinematography: Leandro Martínez
- Edited by: Pablo Mari; Rosario Suárez
- Music by: Gabriel Chwojnik
- Production companies: Rizoma Films; Pandora Filmproduktion; Eddie Saeta
- Distributed by: Aura Films (Argentina); Real Fiction (Germany); Karma Films (Spain)
- Release dates: 15 February 2011 (Berlin); 6 October 2011 (Argentina); 18 November 2011 (Spain); 3 May 2012 (Germany)
- Running time: 95 minutes
- Countries: Argentina; Germany; Spain
- Language: Spanish
- Box office: $1 million

Sidewalls (Spanish: Medianeras) is a 2011 romantic comedy-drama film written and directed by Gustavo Taretto. The film is an international co-production of Argentina, Germany and Spain.

== Plot ==
In the urban sprawl of Buenos Aires, Martín and Mariana are strangers, living in neighboring apartment buildings. Martín is a web designer and takes up photography as a way to cope with his fear of the city. Mariana, an aspiring architect, is forced to move back into her old apartment after a breakup. Living solitary lives in one-room "shoebox" apartments, they both contemplate the changing cityscape, and struggle with anxiety and loneliness, feeling disconnected from other people in the digital age.

"A Short Autumn"

Witnessing a series of accidents on the street—a prostitute's dog jumps from a balcony, causing a passerby to be struck by a taxi and another to have a heart attack—Martín and Mariana separately stop to help. Martín is diagnosed with a harmless case of discarthrosis and has adopted his ex-girlfriend's dog after she abandoned them both to move to the United States. Mariana, working as a window dresser, finds herself talking to the store mannequins she assembles at home. She rediscovers one of her favorite Where's Wally? books, with a page she has never been able to solve. Ignoring a call from her ex-boyfriend, she reflects on the end of their four-year relationship.

"A Long Winter"

Martín and Mariana frequently pass each other in the street without meeting. Spending most of his time online, Martín orders a new desk chair and hires a dogwalker, Ana. They begin dating, but she is already in a relationship and eventually ghosts him. Mariana agrees to a date with a client, Lucas, at a restaurant at the top of a skyscraper. Explaining her phobia of elevators, she takes the stairs, to Lucas' dismay; as he waits at their table, she is overcome with anxiety and leaves. Finding Martín's old office chair on the curb, she brings it home, and deletes all her pictures of her ex-boyfriend from her laptop. She tells the story of the famed Kavanagh Building and is drawn to the music from a neighbor's new piano. Martín tries online dating and meets Marcela, a manic polyglot, but their date ends in disappointment. He begins swimming at Mariana's local pool, where she meets fellow avid swimmer Rafa. They go on a date, and Mariana reacts kindly when Rafa experiences erectile dysfunction, but he ghosts her.

"Spring at Last"

Mariana reflects on the unremarkable exterior "sidewalls" of the city's buildings. Seeking change in her life, she gets a lip piercing, and she and Martín each have a new window installed in their apartments. They unknowingly look out at each other while listening to "True Love Will Find You in the End" on the radio and are both moved to tears by the ending of Manhattan on television. One evening, they connect with each other by chance in an Internet chat room, but just as Mariana asks for Martín's phone number, the city is plunged in a blackout. Buying candles at the same store in the dark, they unwittingly share a static shock before going their separate ways. Some time later, from her window, Mariana spots Martín walking his dog, wearing a red-and-white-striped sweater similar to that of Where's Wally? She conquers her fear of the elevator and races outside where they finally meet. During the closing credits, a YouTube video is shown of Martín and Mariana—now living happily together—lip-syncing to "Ain't No Mountain High Enough".

== Cast ==
- Pilar López de Ayala as Mariana
- Javier Drolas as Martín
- Inés Efron as Ana
- Rafael Ferro as Rafa
- Jorge Lanata as traumatologist
- Carla Peterson as Marcela
- Adrián Navarro as Lucas
- Miguel Dedovich as psychiatrist
- Romina Paula as Martín's ex-girlfriend
- Alan Pauls as Mariana's ex-boyfriend
