= The Scarapist =

2015 American psychological thriller film

- Directed by: Jeanne Marie Spicuzza; Synthian Sharp
- Written by: Jeanne Marie Spicuzza
- Produced by: Jeanne Marie Spicuzza
- Starring: Jeanne Marie Spicuzza; Katy Colloton; R. Michael Gull; Kyle Walsh
- Cinematography: Sean Gelles
- Edited by: Synthian Sharp
- Music by: Thomas Christopher; Guy Hoffman
- Release date: October 22, 2015
- Running time: 81 minutes
- Country: United States
- Language: English

The Scarapist is a 2015 American suspense thriller film written and directed by Jeanne Marie Spicuzza, with co-direction and editing by Synthian Sharp. The film is based on a true story of therapist abuse and related essay written by Spicuzza.

== Plot ==
Lana (Jeanne Marie Spicuzza) a suburban writer, wife and mother, is seduced into bogus therapy by a possessed and demented hypnotherapist Ilse (Katy Colloton). Ilse employs the help of her patients, like Sweenie (R. Michael Gull). In a battle of good versus evil, Lana fights for her family against Ilse, who sets out to destroy them all.

== Cast ==
- Jeanne Marie Spicuzza as Lana
- Katy Colloton as Ilse
- R. Michael Gull as Sweenie
- Kyle Walsh as Nathan
- Nathaniel Ross as Steve

== Release ==
The film had its world premiere at the LA Femme Film Festival in 2015. It was released in Landmark Theatres before coming to streaming services through distributor XVIII Entertainment.

A segment of the film score, The Dinner Party, is on permanent exhibition at the Brooklyn Museum.

== Reception ==
The film has been hailed by critics David Luhrssen, Bennet Pomerantz and Tony Sokol as "intriguing" and "original."

== Awards ==
Year	Award	Category	Recipients	Result	Ref
2016	VDKUF Award	Best Picture	Jeanne Marie Spicuzza	Won	

== See also ==
- Get Out
- Hypnosis (2020 film)
- Hypnotic (2021 film)
- Teachers (2016 TV series)
