= Alan Pauls =

Argentine writer, literary critic and screenwriter

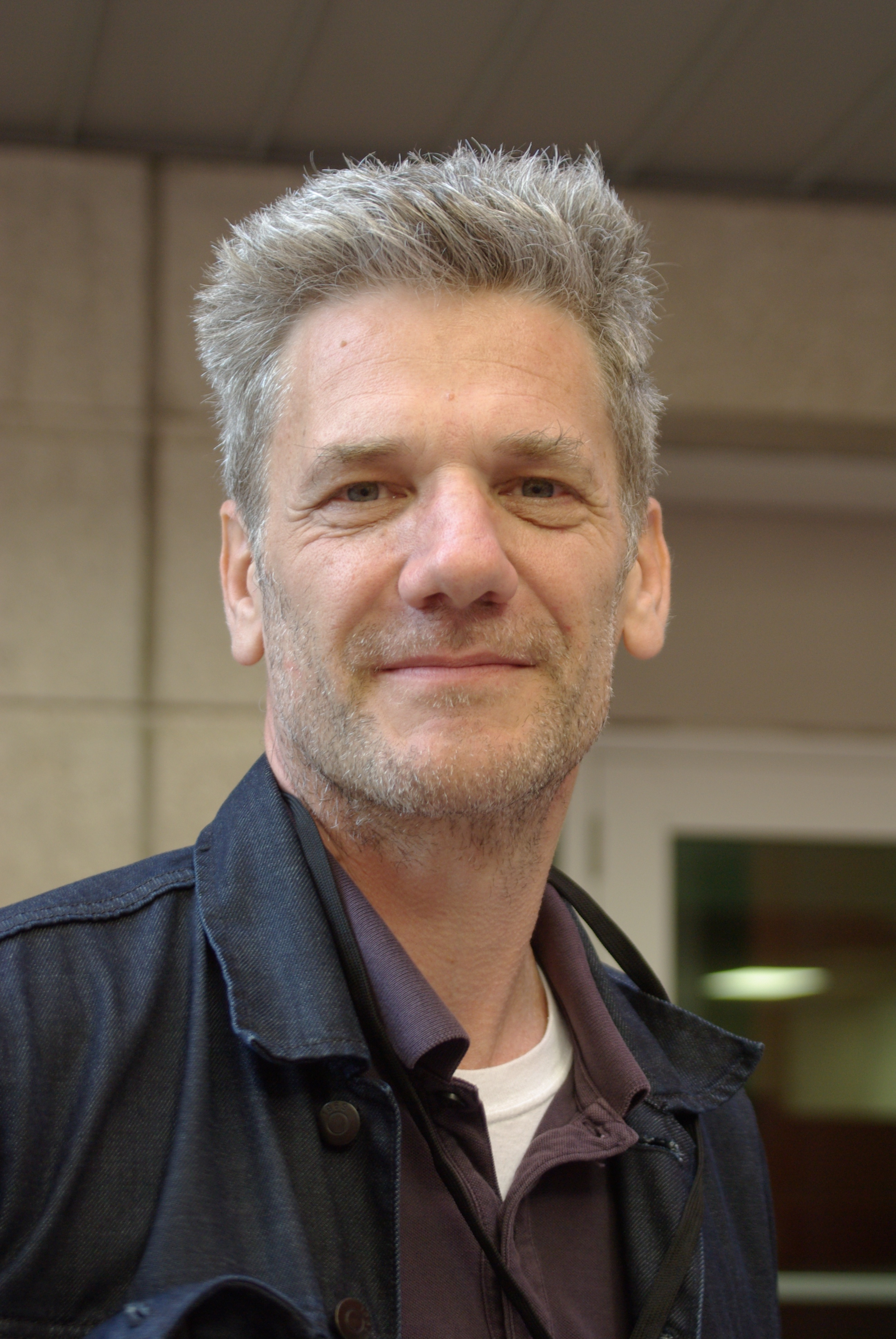
- Born: Buenos Aires, Argentina
- Education: University of Buenos Aires
- Occupation: Writer
- Writing career
- Notable awards: Premio Herralde (2003)

Alan Pauls (born 1959) is an Argentine writer, literary critic and screenwriter.

== Early life ==
Pauls was born in Buenos Aires, Argentina in 1959. He studied literature at the University of Buenos Aires.

== Career ==
An early essay by Pauls on Betrayed by Rita Hayworth by Manuel Puig is said to show his interest in him as an "experimental writer." Although he has expressed skepticism about the avant-garde as any form of program, preferring to see it as a "toolbox." Among his own experimental works is Wasabi from 1994. He also had a longstanding interest in film and his later work El pasado was adapted to film in 2007.

He wrote a "History of" trilogy with the titles being History of crying, History of hair, and History of money.

== Academia ==
Pauls has served as a visiting professor at Princeton University. He is also a professor of literary theory at the University of Buenos Aires Faculty of Philosophy and Letters.

== Awards and fellowships ==
Year	Title
2003	Herralde Award
2013	Santa Maddalena Foundation
2014	Konex Award
2019-2020	DAAD Artists in Berlin Program

== Selected works ==
=== Books ===
Year	Title
1984	El pudor del pornógrafo
1990	El coloquio
1994	Wasabi
2003	El pasado
2007	Historia del llanto
2010	Historia del pelo
2013	Historia del dinero
2013	Noche en Opwijk
2019	Trance: Un glosario

=== Essays ===
Year	Title
1986	Manuel Puig. La traición de Rita Hayworth
1995	Lino Palacio. La infancia de la risa
1996	Cómo se escribe. El diario íntimo
1996	El factor Borges
2006	La vida descalzo
2012	Temas lentos
2019	Trance

== Filmography ==
Year	Title	Role
1983	Los enemigos	Scriptwriter
1986	La era del ñandú	Scriptwriter
1988	Sinfín	Scriptwriter
1995	El censor	Scriptwriter
2001	Private Lives	Scriptwriter
2003	The Blonds	Scriptwriter
2004	Imposible	Scriptwriter
2005	Alan Pauls. Conversaciones con Daniel Guebel	Scriptwriter
2006	Arizona sur	Scriptwriter
2007	¿De quién es el portaligas?	Actor
2011	La vida nueva	Actor
2011	Medianeras	Actor
2012	Cassandra	Actor
