= Sergio Bizzio =

Argentine writer and director (born 1956)

Sergio Bizzio is an Argentine writer and director. He was born on December 3, 1956, in Villa Ramallo, Buenos Aires Province, Argentina.

Among his works, the short story Cinismo (Cynicism), included in his book Chicos (Boys), was the basis for the 2007 movie XXY.

Other works include Rabia, which was awarded the International Prize to the Diversity Novel in Spain.

== Works ==
- Gran salón con piano, 1982 (poetry)
- El divino convertible, 1990 (novel)
- Mínimo figurado, 1990 (poetry)
- Infierno Albino, 1992 (novel)
- Son del África, 1993 (novel)
- Paraguay, 1995 (poetry)
- Más allá del bien y lentamente, 1995 (novel)
- Dos obras ordinarias, 1997 (play, with Daniel Guebel)
- Planet, 1998 (novel)
- Gravedad, 2000 (play)
- En esa época, 2001 (novel)
- El abanico matamoscas, 2002 (poetry)
- Rabia, 2005 (novel)
- El genio argentino, 2005 (poetical essay)
- Chicos, 2006 (short stories)
- El día feliz de Charlie Feiling, 2006 (novel, with Daniel Guebel)
- Era el cielo, 2007 (novel)
- Te desafío a correr como un idiota por el jardín, Editorial Mansalva, 2008 (poetry)
- Realidad, 2009 (novel)
- Aiwa, Editorial Mansalva, 2009 (novel)
- El escritor comido, Editorial Mansalva, 2010 (novel)
- Un amor para toda la vida (novel) 2011
- Borgestein (novel) 2012
- En el bosque del sonambulismo sexual, Editorial Mansalva, 2013
- Dos aventuras espaciales, Editorial Mansalva, 2015 (novel)
