= Alejandro Awada =

Argentine actor

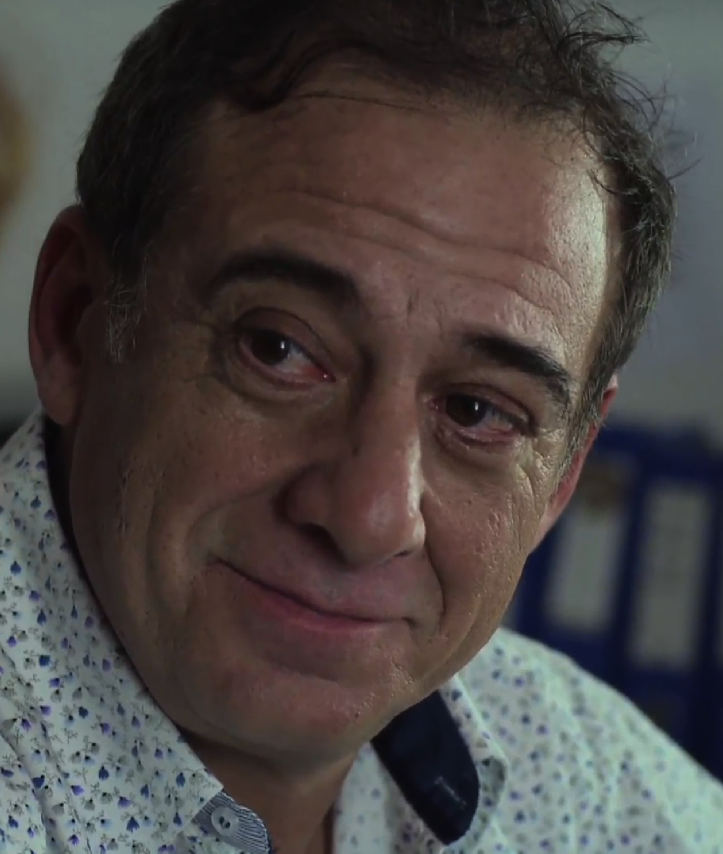
- Born: December 7, 1961 (age 64); Villa Ballester, Argentina
- Occupation: Actor
- Children: 1
- Relatives: Juliana Awada (sister), Mauricio Macri (brother-in-law)

Alejandro Awada (Spanish pronunciation: [aleˈxandɾo aˈwaða]; December 7, 1961) is an Argentine character actor of Syrian and Lebanese descent. He has appeared in a great number of television series, programmes and onstage.

== Personal life ==
Awada was born on 3 December 1961 in Villa Ballester, Argentina, the son of the businessman Ibrahim Awada, a Lebanese Muslim immigrant native of Baalbek, and Elsa Esther "Pomi" Baker, of Syrian-Lebanese descent.

He was known for his relations with Melanie Alfie, Marina Borensztein and Sabrina Farji and presently with Mishal Katz. He has one daughter, Naiara.

His sister Juliana was the First Lady of Argentina as she is married to Mauricio Macri, ex-President of Argentina.

== Filmography ==
- Yosi, the Regretful Spy (2022) TV Series
- El paraíso (2022) as Roco Falcao
- Sangre Blanca (2018)
- El Otro Hombre (2018)
- The Bar (2017)
- Nafta Super (2016) (mini) TV Series
- Historia de un clan (2015) (mini) TV Series
- Francis: Pray for Me (2015)
- The Games Maker (2014)
- Gone Fishing (2012)
- Bye Bye Life (2006)
- El Ratón Pérez (2006) (voice)
- Suspiros del corazón (2006)
- El Aura (2005)
- Tigre escondido, El (2005)
- Suerte está echada, La (2005)
- "Hombres de honor" (2005) TV Series
- Partiendo átomos (2005)
- Traductor, El (2005)
- "Sin crédito" (2005) (mini) TV Series
- Peligrosa obsesión (2004)
- Whisky Romeo Zulu (2004)
- Ay Juancito (2004)
- 48, El (2004)
- Borde del tiempo, El (2004)
- Arizona sur (2004)
- Los simuladores (2002) TV Series
- "Sol negro" (2003) (mini) TV Series
- Séptimo arcángel, El (2003)
- Día que me amen, El (2003)
- Dibu 3 (2002)
- Cabeza de tigre (2001)
- La Fuga (2001)
- Un amor de Borges (2000)
- Nueve reinas (2000)
- Camino, El (2000)
- Tesoro mío (2000)
- Sueño de los héroes, El (1997)
- Comodines (1997)
- Nano (telenovela, 1994) TV Series

== Awards ==
- 2015 Martín Fierro Awards
  - Best actor of miniseries

=== Nominations ===
- 2013 Martín Fierro Awards - Best actor of miniseries
