= Historia de un clan =

- Genre: Drama
- Based on: Puccio family
- Written by: Luis Ortega; Javier Van de Couter; Pablo Ramos; Martín Méndez
- Directed by: Luis Ortega
- Starring: Alejandro Awada; Cecilia Roth; Chino Darín; Nazareno Casero
- Theme music composer: Luis Ortega
- Opening theme: "Fantasma ejemplar" by Daniel Melingo
- Country of origin: Argentina
- Original language: Spanish
- No. of seasons: 1
- No. of episodes: 11

Production
- Executive producers: Leandro Culell; Pablo Flores
- Producer: Pablo Culell

Original release
- Network: Telefe
- Release: September 9 – November 18, 2015

Related
- Fronteras; Un gallo para Esculapio

Historia de un clan (Spanish: History of a Clan) is an Argentine television series made in 2015 by Telefe, starring Alejandro Awada. It is based on the 1980s exploits of the real-life Puccio family.

== Plot ==
The Puccio are apparently a family like any other: Arquímedes (Alejandro Awada), the father, has a plan in hand, for which he needs the help of his family. This is how he reunites his children, Alejandro (Chino Darín) and Daniel (Nazareno Casero), to help him bring about the company. Arquímedes house would become the center of operations, maintaining a life of contrasts. The story tells the family organization of the crime, the connections of Arquímedes Puccio with other criminal gangs and the unsustainable innocence of this story based on real events.

== Production ==
The first episode includes a nude scene by Chino Darín, who plays a rugby player. This was the first scene of male full frontal nudity aired on Argentine television in almost 60 years. The writer, Javier Van de Couter, joked about it on social networks, generating many responses.

== Reception ==
=== Rating ===
The first episode garnered 16.2 rating points. It was the second most-seen TV program of the day, following the last episode of the Binbir Gece rerun. It surpassed the miniseries Signos, which achieved 10.6 rating points.

=== Critical reception ===
Silvina Lamazares of the Clarín newspaper praised the quality of the series. She considered it the best work of actor Alejandro Awada's for television, and the consolidation of Chino Darín as an actor. The TV series has been compared with the film The Clan, released the same year, which is also based on the story of the Puccio family. According to Infobae, both productions have a "tense and hostile" mood, but the miniseries allows for the development of the story at a slower pace and the exploration of the characters in greater depth. Infobae also noted that Awada and Darín's characters received the most focus in the first episode, but considers that Cecilia Roth, Gustavo Garzón, Pablo Cedrón, Nazareno Casero, and Tristán Díaz Ocampo may have greater roles as the story develops.

== Awards and nominations ==
Year	Award	Category	Nominees	Result
2015	Ondas Awards	Honorable Mention	Historia de un clan	Winner
2015	Tato Awards	Best fiction edition	Guille Gatti and Fabricio Rodríguez	Winner
2015	Tato Awards	Best photography direction	Sergio Dotta	Winner
2015	Tato Awards	Best costume in fiction	Andrea Duarte	Winner
2015	Tato Awards	Best fiction art	Julia Freid	Winner
2015	Tato Awards	Best musical curtain	Luis Ortega and Daniel Meligno	Nominated
2015	Tato Awards	Best Screenplay in Fiction	Pablo Ramos, Javier Van de Couter and Luis Ortega	Winner
2015	Tato Awards	Best direction in fiction	Luis Ortega	Winner
2015	Tato Awards	Revelation	Matías Mayer	Nominated
2015	Tato Awards	Best Supporting Actor	Nazareno Casero	Winner
2015	Tato Awards	Best Supporting Actress	Verónica Llinás	Winner
2015	Tato Awards	Best Leading Actor	Alejandro Awada	Winner
2015	Tato Awards	Best Leading Actor	Chino Darín	Nominated
2015	Tato Awards	Best Leading Actress	Cecilia Roth	Nominated
2015	Tato Awards	Best production	Historia de un clan	Winner
2015	Tato Awards	Best unit fiction	Historia de un clan	Winner
2015	Tato Awards	Program of the year	Historia de un clan	Winner
2016	International Festival of Audiovisual Programs	FIPA Gold for Best Series	Historia de un clan	Winner
2016	International Festival of Audiovisual Programs	Best Original Music	Luis Ortega and Daniel Meligno	Winner
2016	Martín Fierro Awards	Best integral production	Historia de un clan	Nominated
2016	Martín Fierro Awards	Best musical curtain	Fantasma ejemplar	Nominated
2016	Martín Fierro Awards	Best director	Luis Ortega	Winner
2016	Martín Fierro Awards	Best author	Javier van de Couter and Pablo Ramos	Winner
2016	Martín Fierro Awards	Revelation	Rita Pauls	Nominated
2016	Martín Fierro Awards	Revelation	María Soldi	Nominated
2016	Martín Fierro Awards	Best Supporting Actress	Verónica Llinás	Winner
2016	Martín Fierro Awards	Best Supporting Actor	Tristán Díaz Ocampo	Winner
2016	Martín Fierro Awards	Best Supporting Actor	Nazareno Casero	Nominated
2016	Martín Fierro Awards	Best unitary actress	Cecilia Roth	Nominated
2016	Martín Fierro Awards	Best unitary actor	Chino Darín	Nominated
2016	Martín Fierro Awards	Best unitary actor	Alejandro Awada	Winner
2016	Martín Fierro Awards	Best Miniseries	Historia de un clan	Winner
2016	Silver Condor Awards	Best Audiovisual for Digital Platforms	Historia de un clan	Winner
2016	Notirey Awards	Leading Actor	Alejandro Awada	Winner
2016	Notirey Awards	Leading Actor	Chino Darín	Winner
2016	Notirey Awards	Female Revelation	Rita Pauls	Nominated
2016	Notirey Awards	Male Revelation	Matías Mayer	Nominated
2016	Notirey Awards	Male Revelation	Benjamín Alfonso	Winner
2016	Notirey Awards	Best production	Historia de un clan	Nominated

== Cast ==
Note: The names of the characters except for the Puccio family and Mónica Sörvick were changed for dramaturgical reasons, the real names are in brackets.

- Alejandro Awada as Arquímedes Rafael Puccio
- Cecilia Roth as Epifanía Ángeles Calvo de Puccio
- Chino Darín as Alejandro Puccio
- Nazareno Casero as Daniel Arquímedes "Maguila" Puccio
- María Soldi as Silvia Inés Puccio
- Rita Pauls as Adriana Claudia Puccio
- Justina Bustos as Mónica Sörvick
- Pablo Cedrón (†) as Labarde (Guillermo Fernández Laborde)
- Gustavo Garzón as Rojas (Roberto Díaz)
- Matías Mayer as Federico "Fede" Olsen (Ricardo Manoukian)
- Benjamín Alfonso as Juani
- Enrique Liporace as Gustavo Bonomi (Gustavo Contepomi)
- Jean Pierre Noher as Roberto Rizzo (Florencio Aulet)
- Verónica Llinás as Angélica Bolena (Nélida Bollini de Prado)
- Coraje Ábalos as Lucas
- Tristán Díaz Ocampo as Coronel Franco (Rodolfo Franco)
- Victoria Almeida as María Belén (Cecilia Demargazzo)
- Laura Laprida as Paula (Isabel Menditeguy)
- Oscar Ferrigno as Federico's Father
- Marcela Guerty as Federico's Mother
- Martín Slipak as Franco Rizzo (Eduardo Aulet)
- Guadalupe Docampo as Adela Pozzi (Rogelia Pozzi)
- Tina Serrano as Aurelia (María Esther Aubone)
- Patricio Aramburu as Emir Seguel (Emilio Naum)
- Bárbara Lombardo as Juliana (Alicia Betti)
- Nicolás Condito as Tomás
- Esteban Meloni as Marco
- Fabián Arenillas as Commissar
- Abel Ayala as Rodolfo

== Data of interest ==
- Guillermo Puccio is nonexistent in the story, leaving the Puccio family with six members instead of seven.
- Daniel Puccio appeared shortly before the second kidnapping, but appears in the series from the beginning.
- Originally it was contemplated that the first actress Norma Aleandro would play Angélica Bolena (Nelida Bollini de Prado), but finally she rejected the offer and was replaced by Verónica Llinás.
