= Martín Piroyansky =

Argentine actor and film director (born 1986)

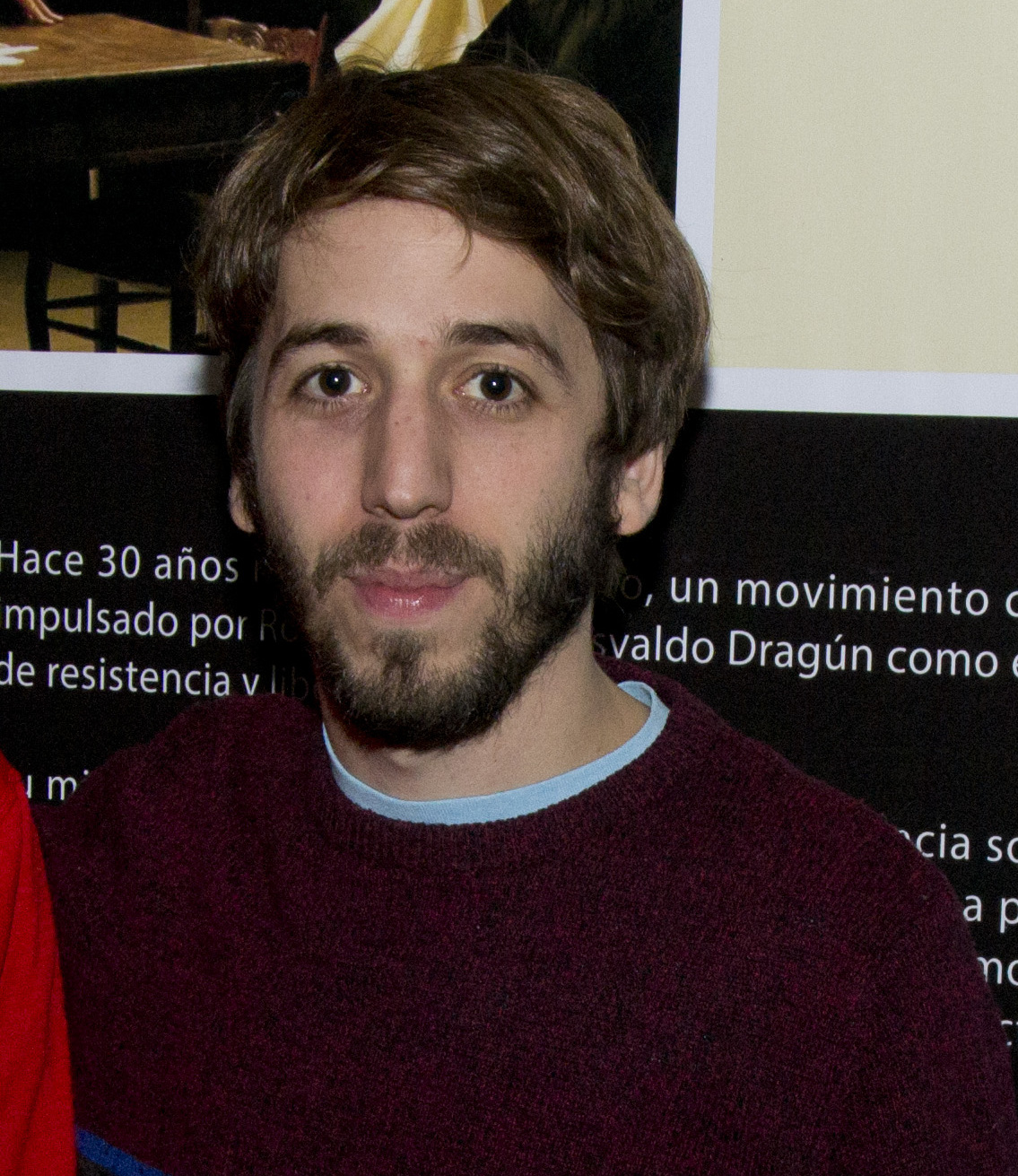
- Piroyansky in 2014
- Born: 3 March 1986 (age 40); Buenos Aires, Argentina
- Occupation: Actor
- Years active: 1998–present

Martín Piroyansky (born 3 March 1986) is an Argentine actor and film director. He has appeared in more than forty films since 1998.

== Selected filmography ==
Year	Title	Role	Notes
2007	XXY	Álvaro	
2011	My First Wedding	Martin	
2015	Volley	Nicolás	also director
2015	No Kids		
2016	That's Not Cheating	Mateo	
2016	Psiconautas	Axel	series regular
2017	The Last Suit	Leo	
2018	Porn for Newbies	Víctor Medina	
