= Luis Puenzo =

Argentine film director, producer and screenwriter (1946–2026)

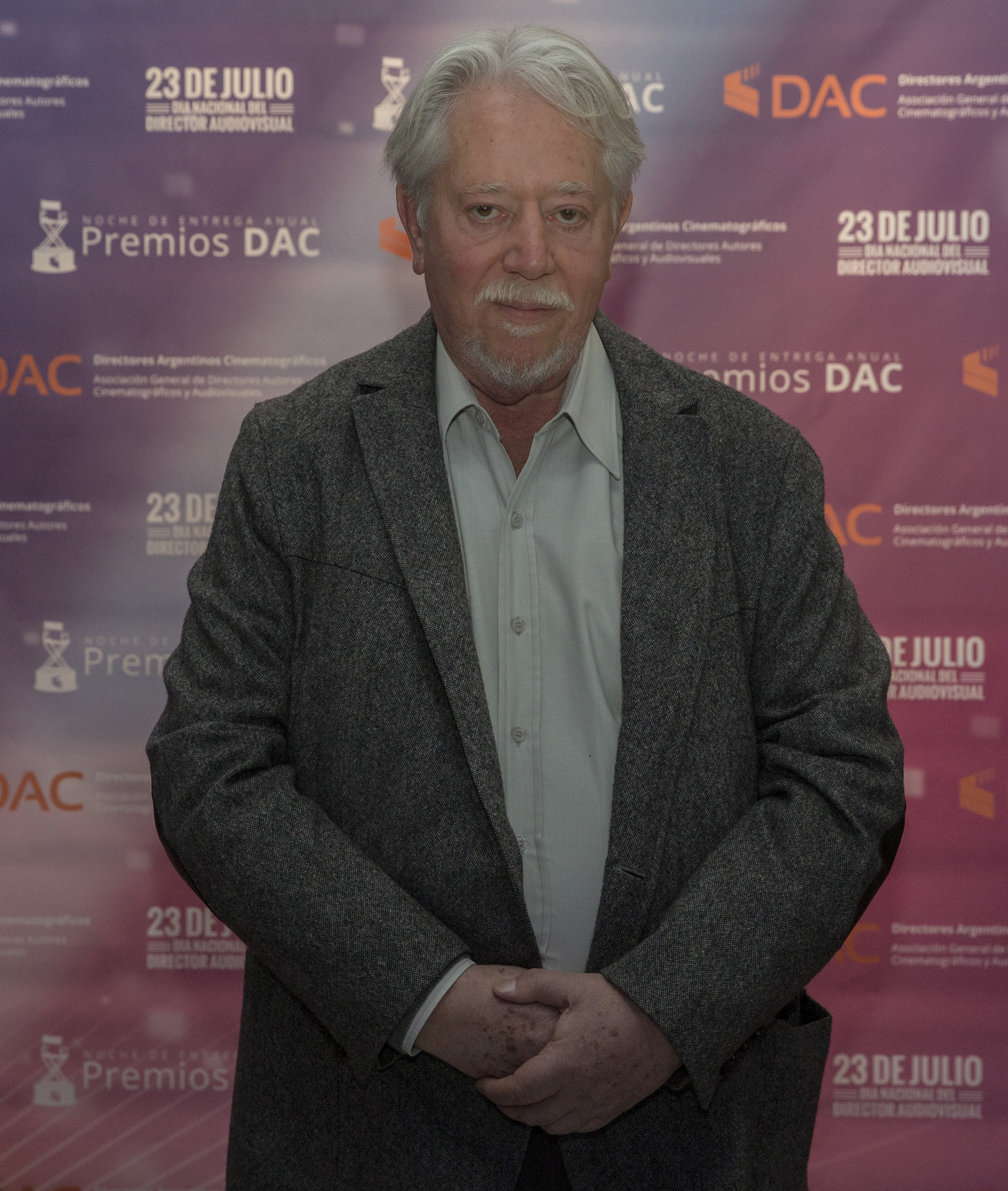
- Puenzo in 2016
- Born: 19 February 1946; Buenos Aires, Argentina
- Died: 21 April 2026 (aged 80); Buenos Aires, Argentina
- Occupations: Film director, producer, screenwriter

Luis Adalberto Puenzo (19 February 1946 – 21 April 2026) was an Argentine film director, producer and screenwriter. He worked mainly in the cinema of Argentina, but also worked in the United States.

== Life and career ==
Puenzo was born in Buenos Aires, Argentina on 19 February 1946. He began a successful career in 1965 producing television advertising spots in Argentina. He founded Luis Puenzo Cinema, a production company, with Sergio Tamburri (film editor and trombone player of the famous Porteña Jazz Band); the firm's name was changed to Cinemanía S.A. in 1974.

During the civic-military dictatorship of Argentina in the mid 1970s and early 1980s many filmmakers became victims of repression and some went into exile; some disappeared. During this difficult time, Puenzo decided to work in advertising.

In the United States he is known for his film Old Gringo (1989), starring Gregory Peck, Jane Fonda and Jimmy Smits.

His film The Official Story (1985) won an Academy Award for Best Foreign Language Film and many other accolades.

He was the president of the INCAA under the presidency of Alberto Fernández.

Puenzo died in Buenos Aires on 21 April 2026, at the age of 80. He was the father of screenwriter and film director Lucía Puenzo.

== Observations ==
The Official Story, arguably Puenzo's best work, is according to Thomas J. Blommers of California State University-Bakersfield "an excellent point of departure to explore some of Argentina and Latin America's most salient problems today. As the film deals with its various themes, it shows their impact on individuals in a very personal way, thus making them more immediate." Blommers says that Puenzo's film has become "a staple in many Latin American culture courses throughout the U.S. and Europe, keeping its relevance intact even though it is now well into its second decade".

According to Sandra Brennan most of his films "offer probing, metaphorical portraits of characters and relationships in the face of larger sociopolitical issues".

== Filmography ==
- Luces de mis zapatos (1973)
- Las Sorpresas (1975), segment "Cinco años de vida"
- La Historia oficial (1985), aka The Official Story
- Old Gringo (1989)
- With Open Arms (1990)
- La Peste (1992), The Plague (USA). Based on Albert Camus' novel of the same name.
- Broken Silence (2002), Mini-TV Series, segment "Some Who Lived."
- La Puta y la Ballena (2004), The Whore and the Whale

== Awards for The Official Story ==
Wins

- Academy Awards: Best Foreign Language Film, 1985.
- Argentinian Film Critics Association Awards: Silver Condor, Best Director and Best Screenplay, 1986.
- Berlin International Film Festival: Interfilm Award, Otto Dibelius Film Award, Luis Puenzo, 1986.
- Cannes Film Festival: Prize of the Ecumenical Jury, Luis Puenzo (1986).
- Toronto International Film Festival: People's Choice Award, Luis Puenzo, 1985.
- Association of Latin Entertainment Critics: Premio ACE, 1985.

Nominations

- Academy Awards: Best Writing, Screenplay Written Directly for the Screen, 1985.
- Cannes Film Festival: Golden Palm, Luis Puenzo, 1985.
