= Puccio family =

Argentine criminal family

- Years active: early 1980s
- Territory: Argentina
- Ethnicity: Italian Argentines, Argentines
- Membership: 6 men
- Activities: kidnappings, murders, extorting ransom

The Puccio family was an Argentine criminal family. Three of the Puccios were convicted of four kidnappings and three murders in the early 1980s.

== Background ==
The family, which comprised father Arquímedes Puccio, mother Epifanía Calvo, and five children (three sons and two daughters) – Alejandro, Silvia, Daniel, Guillermo, and Adriana Puccio - lived in a large house in San Isidro, a wealthy suburb of Buenos Aires. Arquímedes is suspected to have been involved in forced disappearances during the Dirty War. Alejandro was a star rugby player, and Silvia was an art teacher.

== Victims ==
- Ricardo Manoukian, aged 23, who disappeared on 22 July 1982, was the Puccio family's first known kidnapping victim. Manoukian's family paid a ransom of $250,000; nevertheless, he was later killed with three shots to the neck. He had been introduced to Alejandro Puccio by friends in his neighbourhood, and the two often played tennis and football together.
- Engineer Eduardo Aulet was kidnapped on 5 May 1983. Although his family paid $150,000 for his ransom, the Puccios killed him. His body was found four years later.
- Emilio Naum was kidnapped in June 1984 and attempted to resist the kidnapping. He was shot right there, and his body was left in the street.
- Nélida Bollini de Prado, the family's last victim and the only one who could survive, was kidnapped and held for almost a month. She was found and released in a police raid on the Puccio house on 23 August 1985. The police detained the kidnappers when they attempted to retrieve the ransom; Alejandro and his girlfriend Monica were also detained during the raid on the Puccio house.

== Punishment ==
The family was arrested and taken to jail. While awaiting court sentencing, Alejandro tried to commit suicide by jumping from the fifth floor of the courthouse when he was being taken to testify. He survived, however, with serious health complications.

Arquímedes and his two older sons, Alejandro and Daniel, were convicted of the crimes, along with three other accomplices. Arquímedes and Alejandro each received a life sentence, while Daniel was jailed for a number of years. The youngest son, Guillermo, who had escaped from the family long before they were arrested, avoided justice by leaving the country. Epifanía Calvo, Silvia, and Adriana were never convicted of any involvement in the crimes.

== Accomplices ==
The Puccios had at least three adult male accomplices: Roberto Oscar Díaz, Guillermo Fernández Laborda and Rodolfo Victoriano Franco. Franco, a retired colonel, is simply referred to as "the Colonel" in the TV mini-series, Historia de un clan Another was Gustavo Contepomi.

== Later life ==
- The location of Daniel, who served only a few years in prison, was unknown until 17 September 2019, when he was arrested during a routine drug route bus inspection at Rodovia Castelo Branco in Itu, a city in the State of São Paulo in Brazil. He was arrested for carrying falsified Brazilian identification documents. After checking with Interpol it was concluded that there were no pending arrest warrants for Daniel. In his possession was US$5,000.00 in cash which according to him, it was a gift from his brother.
- In the early 1980s, Guillermo left Argentina and never returned. The statute of limitations for his alleged crimes expired in 2013, so he will never be tried.
- In 2007, Alejandro was paroled. A year later, he died of pneumonia at the age of 49.
- In 2011, Silvia, the second eldest child who taught art locally, died of cancer.
- In 2013, Arquímedes died of a stroke, still proclaiming his innocence.
- As of 2015, Epifanía Calvo and Adriana (the youngest child) still own the house in San Isidro where the crimes were perpetrated.

== In popular culture ==
The family and their crimes are the subjects of several works:

- The film, The Clan (2015), starring Guillermo Francella as Arquímedes
- The Telefe TV mini-series, Historia de un clan (2015), starring Alejandro Awada as Arquímedes
- "The secret of the Greco family", (2022) Mexican series produced by Alejandro Ciancio, aired on Netflix, casting Fernando Colunga, Lisa Owen, Manuel Masalva, Luis Machín, Rafael Ferro, Alejandro de Hoyos, Samantha Siqueiros, Antonio de la Vega, Roberta Damián and Paula Reca
