= Alejandro Puccio =

Argentine rugby union footballer, and murderer (1958-2008)

- Born: Alejandro Rafael Puccio; 14 October 1958; Buenos Aires, Argentina
- Died: 27 June 2008 (aged 49); Avellaneda, Buenos Aires, Argentina
- Occupation: Rugby Player
- Years active: 1977–1987
- Height: 1.82 m (5 ft 11 1/2 in)
- Spouse: Nancy Arrat (?–2008)
- Partner: Mónica Sörvik (1982–1995; engaged)
- Parent(s): Arquímedes Puccio and Epifanía Calvo

Alejandro Rafael Puccio (14 October 1958 – 27 June 2008) was an Argentine rugby union footballer and criminal. He played in the Argentine national rugby union team and became famous because of his participation in a criminal organization dedicated to kidnap, torture and murder of wealthy people.

== Biography ==
Alejandro was the son of Arquimedes Puccio, an accountant and lawyer who was a member of the Argentine Secretariat of Intelligence (SIDE) during the dictatorship era of the National Reorganization Process, and of Epifanía Ángeles Calvo, an accounting and mathematics professor. Alejandro had two brothers: Daniel (Maguila) and Guillermo; and two sisters: Silvia and Adriana.

== Career as a rugby player ==
He used to play as a 3/4 wing in the Club Atlético de San Isidro and also participated on the Los Pumas. He debuted in the first league in Club Atlético de San Isidro in 1977 at age 19 and where played until his arrest in August 1985.

He was chosen in 1979 to play the South American Tournament of Rugby. He played a total of five matches and scored three tries.

He was champion of the 1979 and also won Torneo de la URBA in 1981, 1982 and 1985.

== Criminal career ==
He was part of an organization dedicated to extortive kidnappings. Along with his father and his brother, Daniel, he kidnapped and murdered three Argentine businessmen between 1982 and 1985. They also kidnapped a woman whose life was saved when the police broke into their house and arrested some of the family members.

On 22 July 1982, the organization kidnapped Ricardo Manoukian (aged 24 at the time of his murder), a personal friend of Alejandro, in San Isidro. They extorted his family to make them pay $250,000 U.S. dollars (equivalent to as $663,450.78 of 2019). He was held captive in a bathtub where he remained for 11 days until his murder.

On 5 May 1983 they kidnapped Eduardo Aulet, a rugby player and engineer. They initially held him captive in a closet, but after learning that he was claustrophobic, they moved him to the basement of the Puccio's home. The Puccio family extorted Aulet's family for the payment of $150,000 (equivalent to $385,680.72 as of 2019). Although both ransoms were paid, both men were killed by the family.

Arquimedes was arrested by the Division of Frauds and Scams of the Argentine Federal Police on 23 August 1985 at a gas station while he was extorting the last victim's family via payphone for the ransom payment.

Alejandro was arrested that same day while he was at home with his girlfriend, Mónica Sörvik, a gardening teacher of the Escuela de Todos los Santos and then vice-headteacher of the kindergarten Myflower from San Isidro. In the basement, they found the last victim.

When Alejandro was arrested, he denied any participation in the organization's criminal activities. Neither his friends nor his girlfriend believed he was guilty. They always defended his innocence.

When Alejandro was taken to court, in late 1986, in Palacio de Tribunales, he attempted to kill himself by jumping from the fifth floor, inside the building. As a result of this suicide attempt he suffered from convulsions the rest of his life, for which he was medicated with antipsychotics.

On 26 December 1995 he was sentenced to life imprisonment At first, he was visited by his girlfriend, Monica, until he ordered her to stop coming . Later in the 1990s, he married Nancy Arrat, whom he met during his years imprisoned. In jail, he became friends with Sergio Schoklender.

He never accepted any responsibility for the crimes for which he was convicted.

He remained imprisoned until 7 April 1997 when he was released thanks to the 2x1 law on a one million pesos bail. But due to the law's veto he was re-arrested on 28 September 1999.

Alejandro studied psychology and in, September 2000, he was allowed to leave prison for work.

After 22 years imprisoned, Alejandro was released from the Buenos Aires Prison located in the Florencio Varela department on parole, in November 2007. He died a few months after his release, on 27 June 2008, aged 49, after being infected in a hospital where he had been hospitalized for convulsions. No one attended his funeral.

== In popular culture ==
In 2015 the journalist Rodolfo Palacios published a booked called El Clan Puccio (The Puccio Clan) which includes many testimonies from Arquímedes Puccio.

In 2015 the Argentinian film director Pablo Trapero adapted the story into a movie, The Clan starring Guillermo Francella as the main protagonist, playing Arquímedes Puccio. Alejandro was portrayed by Peter Lanzani.

In 2015 Historia de un clan, a series composed of 11 chapters was released, and was broadcast by Telefé, where Alejandro was portrayed by Ricardo "Chino" Darin.
