= K-PAX (disambiguation) =

K-PAX is a 2001 science fiction film starring Kevin Spacey and Jeff Bridges. K-PAX or KPAX may also refer to:

- K-PAX (novel), a 1995 science fiction novel by Gene Brewer, first in a series, from which the 2001 film is adapted
- K-Pax Racing, an auto racing team
- KPAX-TV, a U.S. television station (channel 8) licensed to Missoula, Montana

== See also ==
- Kippax (disambiguation)
