= Hugo Soto (actor) =

Argentine actor and artist

- Born: January 15, 1953; Corrientes, Argentina
- Died: August 2, 1994 (aged 41); Buenos Aires, Argentina
- Occupations: Actor, artist
- Years active: 1972-1994

Hugo Soto (January 15, 1953 – August 2, 1994) was an Argentine actor and artist.

== Biography ==
Soto was born in Corrientes. Developing an early interest in both painting and the stage, Soto relocated to Buenos Aires in the early 1970s, where he was mentored by expressionist painter Carlos Gorriarena.

He became active in Buenos Aires' active theatre life and in 1975, director José María Paolantonio gave Soto his first cinematic role in the comic La película (The Movie). This foray into film was unsuccessful, though Soto became increasingly prominent as a stage actor and was soon invited to become a part of the prestigious San Martín Municipal Theatre's retinue.

A then little-known local documentarian, Eliseo Subiela, cast Soto in the lead role for his 1986 adaptation of an Adolfo Bioy Casares novella, Morel's Invention. Portraying the enigmatic Rantés, Soto's role in Man Facing Southeast earned him a Silver Condor from the Argentine Film Critics Association as Best New Actor and secured his standing in Argentine cinema. The intense, surrealistic performance led to his role in 1988 as the unwitting target of a futuristic dictatorship's paranoia in Gustavo Mosquera's Lo que vendrá (The Near Future). The unconventional lead role earned him recognition in the United States through a Latin ACE Award, for Best Actor.

A minor role that year Beda Docampo Feijóo's The Loves of Kafka was followed by his reuniting with director Eliseo Subiela and Man Facing Southeast co-star Lorenzo Quinteros in the moody Last Images of the Shipwreck, in 1989. He contributed a supporting role in (I, the Worst of All) - María Luisa Bemberg's ode to the reformist 17th century Mexican nun, Sor Juana Inés de la Cruz - and in 1991, he was cast by Fernando Ayala in his gently comic look at social mores in Argentina, Dios los cría (In God's Hands). The film, Ayala's last, was a frank look at both a gay man's struggles with his mostly conservative neighbors and at bisexuality: Soto's character, Ángel, is attracted to both a male co-worker at the bank and a kind-hearted prostitute, with whom he elopes.

Soto's talent as a sculptor was called on by Subiela for his drama, El lado oscuro del corazón (The Dark Side of the Heart) and he was cast in Oscar Barney Finn's 1992 look at literary critic Victoria Ocampo, Four Faces for Victoria. The actor, however, developed AIDS and died from its complications, at age 41.
