= Pere Ponce =

Spanish actor (born 1964)

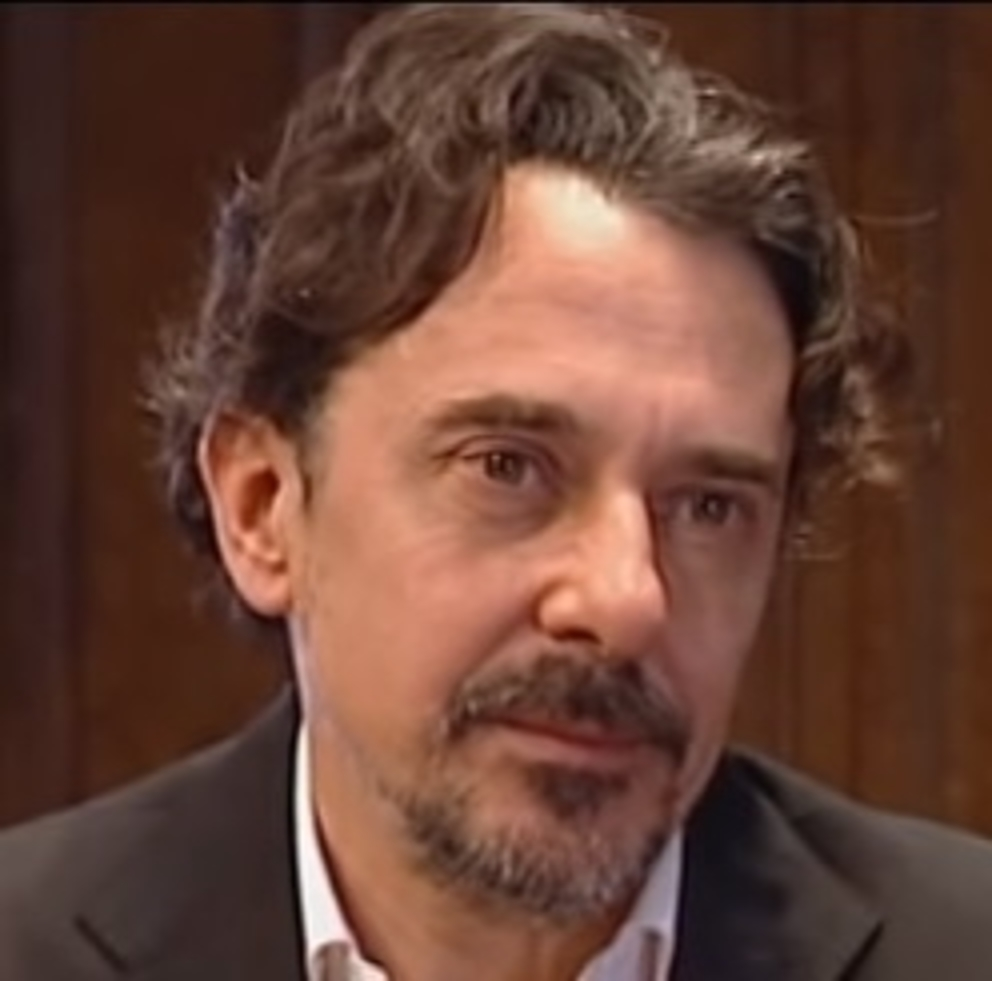
- (2013)
- Born: Pere Ponce Alifonso; 1964 (age 61–62); Tortosa, Spain
- Occupation: Actor

Pere Ponce Alifonso (born 1964) is a Spanish actor from Catalonia. He earned early public recognition for the 1992 romantic comedy film Amo tu cama rica. He has featured in television series such as Cuéntame cómo pasó and Merlí.

== Biography ==
Pere Ponce Alifonso was born in Tortosa, province of Tarragona, in 1964. He studied a degree in psychology, but decided to pursue an acting career instead. Some of his early career in Catalonia include television works such as Pinnic and credits in films directed by Francesc Bellmunt such as Pa d'àngel (1984), Un parell d'ous (1985) and La ràdio folla (1986). Still rather unknown to a wider audience, he starred alongside the similarly unknown Ariadna Gil in Emilio Martínez Lázaro's romantic comedy Amo tu cama rica, which earned both leads a shared Ondas Awards for Best Actors. Performances in films such as Atolladero, Alegre ma non troppo, The Law of the Frontier, El pianista, The Dutchman's Island, Football Days, The Great Vazquez, and Copito de Nieve followed. His performance as Genaro in Snow White (2012) earned him an Actors and Actresses Union Awards nomination for Best Film Actor in a Minor Role, whilst his performance as Colombo in The Replacement (2021) earned him a nomination to the Feroz Award for Best Supporting Actor in a Film.

He played the popular role of Eugenio (a priest with progressive ideals who ends up quitting clergy) in Cuéntame cómo pasó from episode 10 on, leaving the series after 139 episodes with the character's onscreen death in 2014. Other television roles include performances in Tot un senyor, Jacinto Durante, representante, Falsa culpable, Isabel (playing Gutierre de Cárdenas), El ministerio del tiempo (playing Miguel de Cervantes), Merlí (playing Eugeni Bosch) and Jo mai mai (playing Pere Garcia).
