= Los simuladores =

- Promotional poster
- Genre: Comedy drama; Suspense; Mystery; Black comedy; Satire; Thriller
- Created by: Damián Szifron
- Written by: Gustavo Malajovich; Diego Peretti; Damián Szifron; Patricio Vega
- Directed by: Damián Szifron
- Starring: Federico D'Elía; Alejandro Fiore; Diego Peretti; Martín Seefeld
- Opening theme: "Cité Tango" by Astor Piazzolla
- Country of origin: Argentina
- Original language: Spanish
- No. of seasons: 2
- No. of episodes: 24

Production
- Executive producer: Juan Carlos Cabral
- Cinematography: Alejandro Silva Corbalán
- Camera setup: Multicamera setup
- Running time: 40–69 minutes; 109 minutes (series finale)
- Production company: Telefe Contenidos

Original release
- Network: Telefe
- Release: 21 March 2002 – 5 January 2004

Los simuladores (English: The Pretenders) is an Argentine television series created by Damián Szifron for Telefe. Starring Federico D'Elía, Alejandro Fiore, Diego Peretti, and Martín Seefeld, it follows a small team of con artists for hire, who use their skills to solve common people's life problems. The show ran for two seasons, from 2002 to 2004. It was very popular and highly acclaimed, winning a Golden Martín Fierro Award.

Following its original run, the series was occasionally shown in reruns on Telefe. Remakes were produced in Chile, Spain (with D'Elía reprising his role), Russia, and Mexico.

A feature film sequel to the series was announced in March 2022, with the main cast returning and Szifron serving as the screenwriter and director. Originally scheduled to be released in 2024, it was later delayed indefinitely and ultimately cancelled.

== Premise ==
The series centers on a team of four associates who run a "simulation" business, solving the problems and needs of their clients by staging simulacros ("simulations", or confidence tricks) aimed at staging events that help the client come on top of the situation. The price the team charges for its services is exactly twice the cost of the simulation, as well as the client's promise to participate in future simulations. This leads to characters who appeared in previous episodes reappearing in later episodes as secondary actors and helpers for the team, giving the show a degree of continuity. The underlying philosophy used by the team is that sometimes what's legal is not fair, and sometimes what's fair is not legal.

In the second season of the show, a second Simuladores team is introduced. This group, known as the "B-Team" and composed of former clients of the original team (who had appeared on season 1), has been created to take over smaller cases and free the original team for larger and more demanding assignments.

The show is influenced by the literature work Los árboles mueren de pie (1949) by Alejandro Casona. This show shared elements with American 80s series like Stingray, The A-Team, Vengeance Unlimited, and The Equalizer.

== Cast and characters ==
=== Main ===
- Federico D'Elía as Mario Santos:
  The head of the team, responsible for planning, logistics and contacting the clients. He is the most refined member. He is fond of drinking Earl Grey tea, listening to classical music, reading classic French literature, and eating fine, cosmopolitan cuisine. After each successful operation he appears smoking a cigar, often lit by the person that was fooled. He is the only member of the team to be a widower, since his wife died roughly five years before the start of the series.
- Alejandro Fiore as Pablo Lamponne:
  The member in charge of finding the materials and elements needed for the simulations. He has a black mixed-breed dog, "Betún" ("Shoe Polish"), who plays a role in several simulations. He is the most reserved member of the team, being very uncomfortable talking about his feelings or his private life.
- Diego Peretti as Emilio Ravenna:
  The team's leading "actor", who does most of the characterizations required for the simulation. He usually takes the name of "Máximo Cozzetti", which he took from a fraudulent lender who ran an illegal lending business. He's a charismatic playboy, shown to be dating multiple women at the same time.
- Martín Seefeld as Gabriel Medina:
  The team's investigator, in charge of obtaining information about the team's clients, the intended targets of the simulation and the elements of the problem the team must solve. He is the most sensitive member of the team, appearing to be very tough and stoic in public, but in truth being very openly emotional and kindhearted with his friends and family. He became divorced shortly before the time when the show takes place, something that he copes with throughout the first season.

=== Recurring ===
- Pasta Dioguardi as Martín Vanegas
- Juan Carlos Ricci as Arturo Gaona
- Jorge D'Elía as José Feller
- Fernando Sureda as Lucio Bonelli
- Claudio Rissi as Bernardo Galván (season 1, guest season 2)
- Humberto Serrano as Juan Dumas (season 1, guest season 2)
- Miguel Dedovich as Miguens (season 1, guest season 2)
- Martín Coria as Roberto Ávalos (season 1, guest season 2)
- César Vianco as Franco Milazzo (season 2, guest season 1)
- Daniel Valenzuela as Hugo Maresca
- Chang Sung Kim as Tamazaki
- Boy Olmi as José Zarazola
- Patrick Aduma as Douglas Jones
- Beatriz Thibaudin as Ravenna's mother (season 2)
- Alejandro Awada as Marcos Molero (season 2)

== Episodes ==
Season	Episodes	Originally released	
Season	Episodes	First released	Last released
1	13	21 March 2002	19 June 2002
2	11	26 May 2003	5 January 2004

=== Season 1 (2002) ===
No. overall	No. in season	Title	Original release date
1	1	"Tarjeta de Navidad" (Christmas Card)	21 March 2002
The team–Mario Santos, Pablo Lamponne, Emilio Ravenna, and Gabriel Medina–helps struggling artist Bernardo Galván get back together with his estranged wife Claudia. Cast: Carola Reyna, Claudio Rissi
2	2	"Diagnóstico rectoscópico" (Rectoscopic Diagnosis)	28 March 2002
The team helps Martín Vanegas to get rid of loan shark Fernando Laguzzi and his thugs. Cast: Manuel Vicente, Pasta Dioguardi
3	3	"Seguro de desempleo" (Unemployment Insurance)	4 April 2002
The team helps José Feller to get his job back after being unceremoniously fired by his boss Romagnoli for being too old. Cast: Jorge D'Elía, Luis Machín
4	4	"El testigo español" (The Spanish Witness)	11 April 2002
The team helps Alicia Corsiglia to get rid of her nosy, Spanish former lover Carlos Villarreal who is trying to pressure her into restarting their affair. Cast: Andrea Politti, Osvaldo Santoro
5	5	"El joven simulador" (The Young Pretender)	18 April 2002
The team is hired by architect Miguens, whose wife is sick and needs to relax, so that they can help his son Matías to pass seven hard exams in a single week, thus keeping him from flunking the year and stressing out his sick mother. Cast: Nazareno Casero, Miguel Dedovich
6	6	"El pequeño problema del gran hombre" (The Big Man's Small Problem)	25 April 2002
The team must help the President of Argentina, Agustín Mendilaharzu, to get his self-esteem (and his sexual performance) back up. Cast: Héctor Bidonde, Marita Ballesteros
7	7	"Fuera de cálculo" (Out of Calculations)	2 May 2002
While trying to extract some blackmail material from a safety deposit box, Santos and Lamponne get caught up in a botched bank robbery and must help the thieves escape in order to save their lives and those of the other hostages. Cast: Emilio Bardi, Vando Villamil, Joselo Bela, Martín Adjemián, Jorge Prado
8	8	"El pacto copérnico" (The Copernicus Pact)	15 May 2002
Adulterous lawyer José Zarazola hires the team to make his wife Laura want to leave him, clearing his conscience for cheating on her. Cast: Boy Olmi, Claribel Medina, Gabriel Goity
9	9	"El último héroe" (The Last Hero)	22 May 2002
The team works to take all the money from Franco Milazzo, a swindler who poses as an artistic agent, convincing him to enter a fake Survivor-like reality show which will keep him in the Chaco jungle for a full year. Cast: César Vianco, Daniel Valenzuela, Santiago Bal
10	10	"Los impresentables" (The Unpresentables)	29 May 2002
The team helps Clara Molina's crass, lower-class family look good for a dinner with her boyfriend Federico's upper-class family. Cast: Érica Rivas, Cacho Espíndola, Mabel Pessen
11	11	"El colaborador foráneo" (The Foreign Collaborator)	5 June 2002
The team helps a neighborhood get rid of corrupt police officer Diego Crucitti who terrorizes the vicinity. Cast: Lorenzo Quinteros, Fabio Aste, José María Rivara
12	12	"Marcela & Paul"	12 June 2002
The team helps Marcela, a recently divorced woman, get over her depression by arranging a romantic night with whom she believes to be Paul McCartney. Cast: Mónica Galán, Malena Solda
13	13	"Un trabajo involuntario" (An Involuntary Job)	19 June 2002
The team must work for free to free Santos from a mobster who kidnaps him after refusing a job request. Cast: Rolo Puente, Tony Vilas, Pachi Armas

=== Season 2 (2003–2004) ===
No. overall	No. in season	Title	Original release date
14	1	"Los cuatro notables" (The Remarkable Four)	26 May 2003
To help the family of an ailing man, the team tries to convince an HMO doctor-turned-businessman that he has been nominated to the Nobel Prize for an old idealistic paper he wrote in his youth. Cast: Norberto Díaz, Atilio Pozzobón, María Marull
15	2	"Z-9000"	2 June 2003
The team convinces Beatriz Ledesma's abusive husband Carlos Lorenzo that he has a murderous clone stalking him. Cast: Mónica Villa, Luis Luque
16	3	"La gargantilla de las cuatro estaciones" (The Necklace of the Four Seasons)	9 June 2003
The team is contacted by engineer Alejandro Barack who can't stop thinking on sleeping with other women while in a relationship with Corina Lázaro; however, they pretend to refuse the case and he becomes part of the simulation. Cast: Federico Olivera, Eleonora Wexler
17	4	"El clan Motul" (The Motul Clan)	16 June 2003
Simulating a vampires story, the team saves a retirement house from being sold by its owner Luis Torrejón. Cast: Mario Alarcón, Guido Gorgatti, Sandra Di Milo
18	5	"El vengador infantil" (The Child Avenger)	23 June 2003
The team helps young comic-book lover Pablo Herdel to gain self-esteem and resist a bully. Cast: Luciano Acosta, Pablo Iemma, Fernando Caride, Alejandro Awada
19	6	"El matrimonio mixto" (The Mixed Marriage)	30 June 2003
A Jewish boy, Gustavo Brosky, and a catholic girl, Paula Rivera, hire the team to convince their respective parents that a mixed marriage is not a bad idea. Cast: Jimena La Torre, Nicolás Mateo, Raúl Rizzo, Rita Terranova, Juan Manuel Tenuta, Alejandra Da Passano
20	7	"La brigada B" (The B-Team)	7 July 2003
U.S. agents capture the members of the B-Team after taking them for terrorists–which they were pretending to be for the purposes of a simulation–leading the original team to try to infiltrate the FBI itself to free them. Cast: Jorge D'Elía, Juan Carlos Ricci, Pasta Dioguardi, Fernando Sureda
21	8	"Fin de semana de descanso" (Holiday Weekend)	14 July 2003
Taking a small vacation, the team unmasks a crime being committed by a couple, the Sherlock Holmes way. Cast: Atilio Veronelli, Verónica Llinás, Sergio Lerer, Pepe Monje
22	9	"El debilitador social" (The Social Debilitator)	21 July 2003
The team simulates a trial against model manager Manuel Garriga that encourages girls into unhealthy eating habits, charging him for "pre-crimes against Humanity". Cast: Jean Pierre Noher, Marcela Kloosterboer, Nicolás D'Agostino
23	10	"El anillo de Salomón" (The Ring of Solomon)	4 August 2003
Famous orchestra conductor Alejandro Horvat hires the team to get rid of Fabián Charbone, an obnoxious classical music fan. Cast: Villanueva Cosse, Carlos Santamaría
24	11	"Episodio final" (Final Episode)	5 January 2004
Milazzo comes back from the jungle seeking to kill the team for having tricked him and stolen from him almost one million pesos (at that time, almost USD200,000). The team then makes a simulation to make him believe that it was a test, and then train him to kill Osama bin Laden. The team also works to convince an ambitious corporate employee, Diego Manzione, to return home and help his father and sister with the family business. This is the team's final job, as they decide to quit for some time and go their separate ways. Cast: César Vianco, Alejandro Awada, Gerardo Chendo, Adriana Salonia
