= Daniel Freire =

Argentine film actor

- Born: December 29, 1961 (age 63); Buenos Aires, Argentina
- Occupation: Actor

Daniel Freire (born 29 December 1961, in Buenos Aires) is an Argentine film actor.

He had his film debut in 1993 in Un Muro de silencio and has appeared in over 15 films including Las Aventuras de Dios 2000 in which he portrayed Jesus Christ and Arizona Sur in 2004.

In 2005 he appeared in 27 episodes of the Spanish TV series Motivos personales.

He has lived in Spain since 1999.

== Filmography ==
- "Amar es para siempre" (2014-actualidad)....Aquilino González
- Adius Amoto ....Gervasio (2011)
- Doctor Mateo .... Tomas Pellegrini "Tom" (2008-2011)
- Un ajuste de cuentas (2009) .... Josito Fernández
- MIR .... Dr. Javier Lapartida (2007-2008)
- El síndrome de Ulises (1 episode, 2008)
- Ese beso (2008)
- Hermanos & detectives (1 episode, 2007)
- El niño de barro (2007) .... Comisario Petrie. / The Mudboy (International: English title)
- Arizona sur (2007)
- Masala (2007) (TV)
- Límites naturales (2006)
- Motivos personales .... Daniel Garralda (2005)
- Aliteración (2005)
- Machulenco (2005) .... Víctor
- Interior (noche) (2005) .... Emilio
- El mono de Hamlet (2005)
- Laura (2004/I)
- Catarsis (2004) .... Enrique
- Matar al ángel (2004) .... Sabino
- Una pasión singular (2003) .... Blas Infante
- Ana y los 7 (2002) TV series .... David (2002-2004)
- El refugio del mal (2002) .... Martín
- Impulsos (2002) .... Jaime. / Impulses (International: English title)
- Lucía y el sexo (2001) .... Carlos/Antonio. / Lucia et le sexe (France). / Sex and Lucia (International: English title)
- Sagitario (2001) .... Gustavo
- Las aventuras de Dios (2000) .... Jesus Christ. / The Adventures of God (International: English title)
- Balada del primer amor (1999)
- El milagro de Sara Duval (1998)
- Canción desesperada (1997)
- El censor (1995) .... Hombre Basural. / The Eyes of the Scissors (International: English title)
- Un muro de silencio (1993). / A Wall of Silence (International: English title). / Black Flowers (International: English title)

=== Self ===
- La mandrágora .... Himself / ... (6 episodes, 2005-2009)
- 3 i més (2006) TV series .... Himself (2007)
- Versión española .... Himself (1 episode, 2005). / Episode dated 29 April 2005 (2005) TV episode .... Himself
- La noche con Fuentes y cía. .... Himself (1 episode, 2005). / Episode dated 24 April 2005 (2005) TV episode .... Himself
- XVIII Premios Goya (2004) (TV) .... Himself - Presenter: Best New Actress & Best Costume Design
- Jimanji kanana .... Himself (1 episode, 2003). / Episode dated 10 August 2003 (2003) TV episode .... Himself
- Lo + plus .... Himself (1 episode, 2002). / Episode dated 18 December 2002 (2002) TV episode .... Himself
- El Che (1997) .... Alejandro. / El Che - Ernesto Guevara: Enquête sur un homme de légende (France: poster title)

=== Archive Footage ===
- 52 premis Sant Jordi de cinematografia (2008) (TV) .... Comisario Petrie
- Maquillando entre monstruos (2007) (TV) .... Carlos/Antonio
