= Pa d'àngel =

1984 Catalan comedy film

- Directed by: Francesc Bellmunt
- Production company: Ópalo Films
- Release date: 1984
- Country: Spain

Pa d'àngel is a 1984 Spanish comedy film directed by Francesc Bellmunt and produced by Ópalo Films. It screened in the Panorama of Spanish Cinema section at the 1984 San Sebastian International Film Festival. The film was also released under the Castilian Spanish title Pan de ángel.

== Plot ==
Barcelona, 1983. Agustí Martorell, a forty-year-old left-wing lawyer, an atheist and a former anti-Franco activist, discovers that his 15-year-old daughter Esther has been secretly baptised under the influence of a progressive priest. Agustí reacts to Esther's religiosity much as his own parents had reacted to his atheism.

== Cast ==
The cast includes:

- Llorenç Santamaria
- Eva Cobo
- Pierre Oudrey
- Patrícia Soley-Bertran
- Francesc Albiol
- Pere Ponce
- Joan Borràs
- Josep Maria Cañete
- Joaquín Cardona
- Artur Costa
- Rosa Cadafalch
- Carme Callol
- Elisa Crehuet
- Ferran Rañé

== Awards ==
Pere Ponce received the award for best actor for his performance in the film at the 1985 Premis de Cinematografia de la Generalitat de Catalunya.
