= K-PAX (novel) =

1995 American science fiction novel by Gene Brewer

- Author: Gene Brewer
- Language: English
- Genre: Science fiction
- Publisher: St. Martin's Press
- Publication date: 1995
- Publication place: United States
- ISBN: 0-312-97702-6
- OCLC: 45697130

K-PAX is a 1995 American science fiction novel by Gene Brewer, the first in the K-PAX series. The series deals with the experiences on Earth of a being named Prot. It is written in the first person from the point of view of Prot's psychiatrist.

K-PAX was adapted into a theatrical film of the same name, released in 2001.

== Series ==
- K-PAX (1995)
- K-PAX II: On a Beam of Light (2001)
- K-PAX III: Worlds of Prot (2002)
- K-PAX IV: A New Visitor from the Constellation Lyra (2007)
- K-PAX V: The Coming of the Bullocks (2014)

== Synopsis ==
In 1990, a man is picked up by the New York Police after being found bending over the victim of a mugging at Grand Central Terminal in midtown Manhattan. After responding to the police questions with somewhat strange answers, he is transferred to Bellevue Hospital for evaluation. Although not physically ill, he is found to harbor the strange delusion that he is from a planet called K-PAX in the Lyra constellation. The patient calls himself "Prot" (pronounced to rhyme with "goat", and intentionally written in lower-case to reflect the insignificance of an individual life form in the universe). He is eventually transferred to the Manhattan Psychiatric Institute (MPI), where he becomes the patient of Dr. Gene Brewer.

Prot is extremely fond of fruit, including banana skins and apple cores, which he eats during each session. He tells Brewer that he is 337 Earth years old, that he has visited Earth often, and that on this visit he has traveled to most of the world's countries for the past four years and nine months. He exhibits a sense of humor, reassuring Brewer on the first session that, despite being one, an alien will not burst out of his chest. Brewer discovers that Prot is also a savant who possesses arcane information about astronomy that excites a group of astronomers who meet him. Prot states that he possesses at least rudimentary conversational knowledge of most human languages as well as the languages of animals, including whale song and the apparent gibberish of some schizophrenic patients.

Though Prot's dialogue is usually satirical, he turns out to be highly suggestible and easily hypnotized. Once Brewer learns this, he begins more serious therapy. With the help of journalist Giselle Griffin, Brewer discovers that Prot may be Robert Porter, who was traumatized by the murder of his wife and child, and his subsequent killing of the perpetrator, and that prot may be an alter ego resulting from dissociative identity disorder. Brewer speculates that the name Prot is derived from Porter's surname.

When Prot "returns" to his own planet, Robert Porter is left in a catatonic state. However, Bess, another patient Prot had promised to take with him, disappears along with a box of souvenirs prot has been collecting. Before departing, prot promises to return in five Earth years.

== Adaptations ==
The 2001 film K-PAX was directed by Iain Softley and based on the first book in this series. Kevin Spacey portrays prot, and Jeff Bridges plays the psychiatrist.

K-PAX was made into a stage play, also written by Gene Brewer, and has been performed at the Lion and Unicorn Theatre, directed by Victor Sobchak. In 2010, the play made its North American debut at The Geneva Underground Playhouse in Geneva, Illinois directed by Eric Peter Schwartz.

== Reception ==
Booklist called the novel "fascinating". Psychiatrist Allan Beveridge wrote that the novel is a good example of "why psychiatrists should read fiction", saying that it shows "how to approach moral quandaries and decision-making". Science fiction scholar David Ketterer compares it with the novel Star-Begotten by H.G. Wells. Reviewer Michael Berry wrote "There aren't many possible denouements for a book like this, and Brewer steers a middle course between the extremes of outright fantasy and predictable mundaneness. K-PAX displays the mildly off-putting attitude found in such movies as Rain Man and Forrest Gump, that we all can learn so much about ourselves from the simple-minded, but one can't deny that some of the story's episodes are genuinely funny and touching." Reviewer Lisa Koosis wrote that Prot "is one of the more extraordinary characters found in current science fiction" and that the author, "without actually having the characters set foot on another planet, manages to bring an alien world to life".

== Lawsuit ==
Upon the release of the film version of the book, Argentinian director Eliseo Subiela claimed that K-PAX plagiarized his 1986 film Man Facing Southeast, and sued Brewer. The complaint was later withdrawn when Subiela could not afford continued litigation, but maintained his stated position on the matter until his death in late 2016. Brewer went on to release a memoir exploring his inspiration for the books, called Creating K-PAX or Are You Sure You Want to Be a Writer?

== See also ==
- K-PAX, a movie from 2001
- Man Facing Southeast, a movie from 1986 that preceded the novel
- Kirk Allen, a psychiatric patient who claimed to live in the worlds depicted in Edgar Rice Burroughs' series of novels titled Barsoom
- Anarchism
- Utopia
