= List of Argentine films of 2007 =

A list of films produced in Argentina in 2007:

Argentine films of 2007
| Title | Director | Release | Genre |
A - B
| 1 peso, 1 dólar | Gabriel Condron | | |
| A cada lado | Hugo Grosso | | |
| A dos tintas | Lucas Di Santo y Walter Becker | | |
| A los cuatro vientos | Alejandro Larrán | | |
| El amor y la ciudad | Teresa Costantini | | |
| La antena | Esteban Sapir | | |
| Antonio Gil Núñez... La leyenda | Roberto Cesán | | |
| El árbol | Gustavo Fontán | | |
| El Arca | Juan Pablo Buscarini | | |
| Argentina beat | Hernán Gaffet | | |
| Argentina latente | Pino Solanas | | |
| Arizona Sur | Daniel Pensa y Miguel Angel Rocca | | |
C - D
| La cáscara | Carlos Ameglio | | |
| CineNegro | Mariana Wenger | | |
| Ciudad en celo | Hernán Gaffet | | |
| Cobrador, in god we trust | Paul Leduc | | |
| Cocalero | Alejandro Landes | | |
| Cuando ella saltó | Sabrina Farji | | |
| ¿De quién es el portaligas? | Fito Páez | | |
| El destino | Miguel Pereira | | |
E - I
| La educación de las hadas | José Luis Cuerda | | |
| Encarnación | Anahí Berneri | | |
| Ese mismo loco afán | Enrique Muzio | | |
| Estrellas | Federico León y Marcos Martínez | | |
| Familia Lugones | Paula Hernández | | |
| Final de obra | José Glusman | | |
| Fotografías | Andrés Di Tella | | |
| Fuga | Pablo Larraín | | |
| Futuro perfecto | Mariano Galperín | | |
| Gambartes, verdades esenciales | Miguel Mato | | |
| Garúa | Gustavo Corrado | | |
| Germán | Nicolás Batlle, Fernando Molnar, Sebastián Schindel y Huck | | |
| Hacer patria | David Blaustein | | |
| Hunabkú | Pablo César | | |
| ¿Infidelidad? | Miguel Oscar Menassa | | |
| El infinito sin estrellas | Edgardo González Amer | | |
| Incorregibles | Rodolfo Ledo | | |
| Isidoro: La film | José Luis Massa | | |
J - O
| La loma... no todo es lo que aparenta | Roberto Luis Garay | | |
| M | Nicolás Prividera | | |
| Madres | Eduardo Félix Walger | 9 of March | Documentary |
| Madres con ruedas | Mario Piazza y Mónica Chirife | | |
| Las mantenidas sin sueños | Vera Fogwill y Martín Desalvo | | |
| Martín Fierro: la film | Liliana Romero y Norman Ruiz | | drama |
| Más que un hombre | Dady Brieva y Gerardo Vallina | | |
| Mate Cosido, el bandolero fantasma | Michelina Oviedo | | drama |
| La mirada de Clara | Pablo Torre | | |
| La mujer rota | Sebastián Faena | | |
| Música nocturna | Rafael Filipelli | | |
| El niño de barro | Jorge Algora | | drama |
| Nos fuimos | Gonzalo Santiso | | |
| Nevar en Buenos Aires | Miguel Miño | | |
| Número 8 | Sergio Esquenazi | | |
| El otro | Ariel Rotter | | drama |
P - S
| El Pasado | Héctor Babenco | | |
| La peli | Gustavo Postiglione | | |
| Pueblo chico | Fernán Rudnik | | |
| Pulqui, un instante en la patria de la felicidad | Alejandro Fernández Mouján | | Documentary |
| Los próximos pasados | Lorena Muñoz | | |
| Pura sangre | Leo Ricciardi | | |
| Quiéreme | Beda Docampo Feijóo | | |
| ¿Quién dice que es fácil? | Juan Taratuto | | |
| El resultado del amor | Eliseo Subiela | | |
| El salto de Christian | Eduardo Calcagno | | |
| Sensaciones (historia del Sida en la Argentina) | Hernán "Pampo" Aguilar | | |
| La señal | Ricardo Darín y Martín Hodara | | Drama |
| La soledad | Maximiliano González | 6 of September | Drama |
| Sotuyo, sueños de un viejo cerro | Eduardo López y Eliana Leira | | |
| Snuff 102 | Mariano Peralta | | Horror |
T - Z
| Terapias alternativas | Rodolfo Durán | | |
| TL-1, mi reino por un platillo volador | Tetsuo Lumière | | |
| Tocar el cielo | Marcos Carnevale | | |
| El traductor | Oliverio Torre | | |
| Tres de corazones | Sergio Renán | | |
| Una novia errante | Ana Katz | | |
| UPA! Una film argentina | Santiago Giralt, Camila Toker y Tamae Garateguy | | |
| Vacas gordas | Giorgio Peretti | | |
| La velocidad funda el olvido | Marcelo Schapces | | |
| Vísperas | Daniela Goggi | | |
| XXY | Lucía Puenzo | | |
| Yo la recuerdo ahora | Néstor Lescovich | | |

== See also ==
- 2007 in Argentina

== External links and references ==
- Argentine films of 2007 at the Internet Movie Database
