= People in the Room =

1950 novel by Norah Lange

- First edition
- Author: Norah Lange
- Original title: Personas en la sala
- Translator: Charlotte Whittle
- Cover artist: Horacio Butler (1897-1983)
- Language: Spanish
- Genre: Fiction, Avant-garde
- Publisher: CABA: Editorial Sudamericana (Spanish 1st ed.); Sheffield: And Other Stories (English 1st. ed)
- Publication date: 1950
- Publication place: Argentina
- English publication date: August 9, 2018
- Media type: Print (Paperback)
- Pages: 119 p. (Spanish 1st ed.); 176 p. (English 1st ed.)
- ISBN: 978-1-911508-23-6

People in the Room is a novel by Argentine author Norah Lange, originally published in Spanish under the name Personas en la sala in 1950. The English version, translated by Charlotte Whittle, was published in August 2018 by And Other Stories. In 1959, the Argentine Writer’s Association bestowed the novel with the Gran Premio de Honor. The book was notable for diversifying existing feminine themes expected of female Argentine authors at the time into new areas.

The story follows a young girl in Argentina as she notices and then begins to obsess over three figures she can see in the house across the street from hers. The blurred lines between reality and imagination in People in the Room contribute to an eerie ambiguity present throughout the novel.

== Background ==
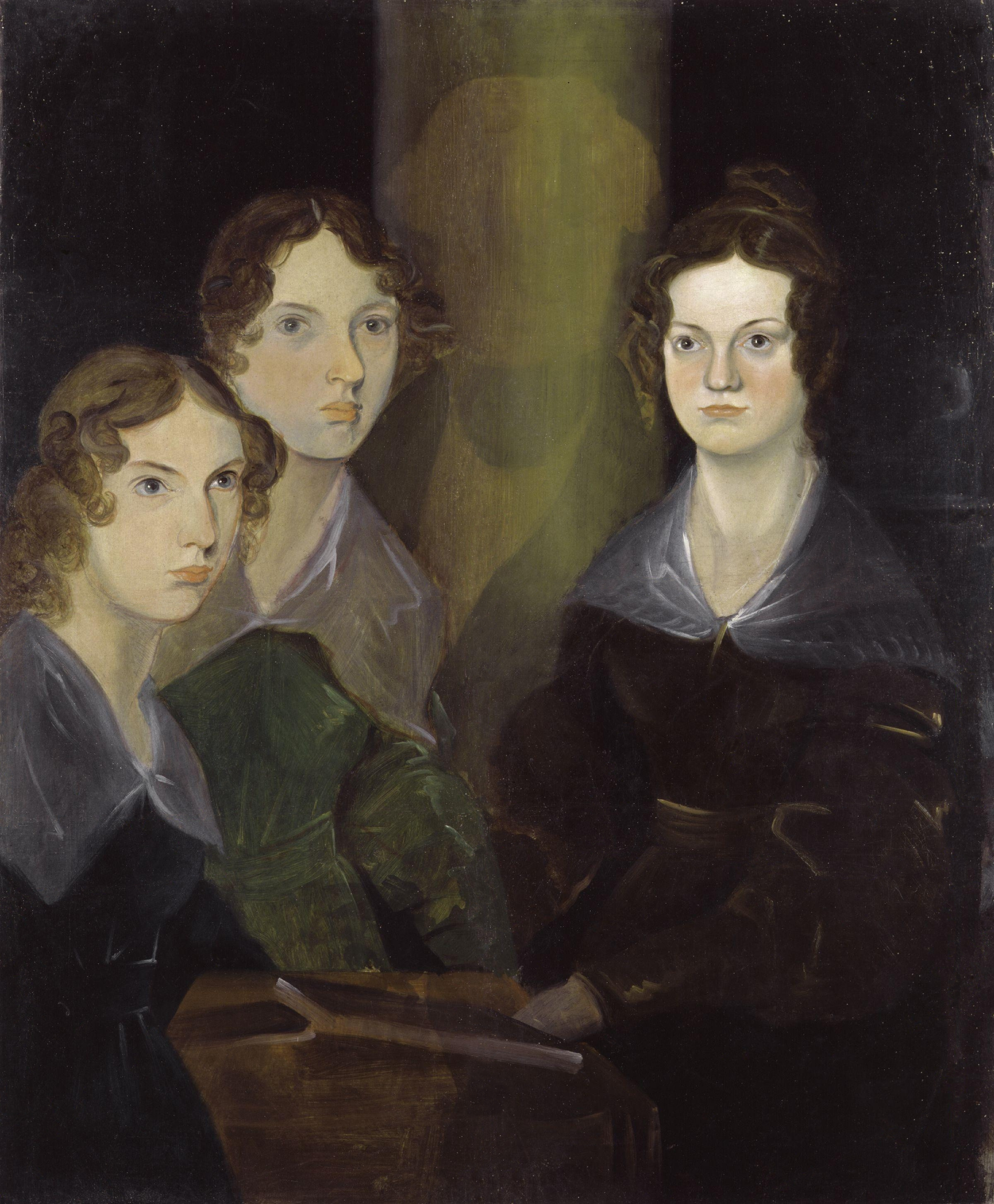
Portrait of the three Brontë sisters that inspired the sisters in People in the Room

Born in Buenos Aires in 1905, Norah Lange grew up surrounded by accomplished writers such as her distant cousin Jorge Luis Borges, and her future husband, Oliverio Girondo. She became more involved in the Argentine writing scene as she joined the acclaimed literary-artistic Martín Fierro Group and contributed to the ultraist literary movement. She gained notoriety for writing a collection of books with adolescent female protagonists. Perhaps her most important work, People in the Room was published in 1950 and was inspired by a portrait of the three Brontë Sisters. The book was largely overlooked; Lange was seen primarily as a muse for others rather than a writer. In 2018, the novel was translated into English by Charlotte Whittle, who herself says she only found People in the Room because of her neighbor, by coincidence named "Nora" Lange.

== Plot summary ==
An unnamed seventeen-year-old girl living with her family on Avenida Juramento in Buenos Aires, Argentina begins filling much of her free time secretly observing three mysterious women in the house across the street. From her house, she can see the women sitting in their drawing-room. Fixated on these women, she searches their faces, imagining the stories of their lives.

Slowly, the clarity in time and space of the novel begins to morph into vagueness as the narrator is pulled from reality into her own imagination. The girl feels a sense of ownership over the figures across the street as she weaves a possible version of their lives. It is unclear whether she actually visits these ladies, but she describes what it is like to sit with them in the room, and the somber dynamic between them. She thinks they must be sisters whose lives have unravelled so far that they grimly await salvation or death. The girl changes from wishing death on the eldest sister to liking her as the story progresses. One of the sisters receives a bundle of letters from a man one evening which she thinks must be a former lover, and the young girl is filled with hatred that she might be left alone that way.

Her family slowly takes notice of her changing behavior and intervenes. She is sent to a nearby city Adrogué for four days to clear her head. She is concerned she will miss something important across the street while she is gone, but realizes it could be an adventure to leave for a while and see what it is like when she returns. Her unhealthy obsession begins to relax a bit during her time out of town. However, it only builds anticipation for her homecoming and inevitable reunion.

When she gets back home, she notices the drawing-room across the street is dark. She asks her family if anyone in the neighborhood has died, but they reassure her that no one died. Distraught that her family seems ignorant to this grand change in the one thing that has consumed her life for the past months, she mourns. The book ends with a suggestion that the sisters moved out and put the home up for rent.

== Themes ==
The main themes of People in the Room are death and isolation. Throughout the novel, the narrator examines the figures across the street from her and contemplates their lives and how they will die. This includes descriptions of these women committing suicide and even desires to murder them. Many times Lange’s writing, she seems scared of getting older, mirroring the deteriorated view of what she sees as normal adulthood. People in the Room is also considered to be a commentary on feminine roles within Argentine society and the mental torture that can be caused by household isolation.
