= Andrés Boiarsky =

Argentine musician (born 1957)

Andrés Boiarsky (born October 9, 1957) is an Argentine alto and tenor saxophonist. He is known for his work as a jazz musician and his contributions to the film Man Facing Southeast (1986).

== Biography ==
Boairsky was born in Buenos Aires, on October 9, 1957. A 1972 concert by the Duke Ellington Orchestra in Buenos Aires, and a later appearance by trumpeter Dizzy Gillespie, inspired Boiarsky to become a jazz musician. He took part in the local revivalist jazz scene of the mid-1970s as a clarinetist, and subsequently played the alto and tenor saxophones. He was admitted into the National Conservatory of Music, where he was trained in classical music, and in 1978, enrolled in the Royal College of Music in London.

He recorded a solo album for Spotlight Records, and after forming a group, performed in a number of BBC programs. He returned to Argentina in 1982, and following two solo albums for CBS Records, he composed and performed incidental music for the Argentine science fiction film, Man Facing Southeast, in 1986. He later toured Latin America with latin jazz bandleader Paquito D'Rivera and composer Carlos Franzetti, and with their support, relocated to New York City in 1988. Boiarsky joined Lionel Hampton's Orchestra, and in 1989, was named music director by the renowned vibraphonist. He was reunited with Paquito D'Rivera as a member of his United Nations Orchestra in 1993, where he performed until 1998.

Boiarsky recorded his first U.S. album, Into the Light, for Reservoir Records in 1996. He took part in the commemorative album, Dizzy's 80th Birthday, alongside Jon Faddis and Cyrus Chestnut, among others, in 1997, and was inducted into Slide Hampton's Dizzy Gillespie Alumni All Stars. He later collaborated with Jimmy Heath, Nancy Wilson, Al Di Meola, and Claudio Roditi, with whom he worked on a number of samba-jazz fusion recordings. A performance with Japanese pianist Tomoko Ohno in 2004 led to a partnership, through which they recorded Shadows of Spring for MDR Records in 2005 and Tomoko in Buenos Aires, the following year.

His performances have included numerous appearances at the White Nights Jazz Festival in St. Petersburg, and at the CJW Jazz Lounge in Shanghai, where he had relocated by 2008. Boiarsky also taught extensively in his discipline, leading clinics at the University of Idaho and George Mason University, as well as in Argentina.
