= Quiéreme (film) =

- Theatrical release poster
- Directed by: Beda Docampo Feijóo
- Written by: Beda Docampo Feijóo
- Produced by: Álvaro Zapata; Harold Sánchez; Pablo Kompel; Ibón Comenzana; Beda Docampo Feijóo; Cristina Durández
- Starring: Darío Grandinetti; Ariadna Gil; Kira Miró; Agustina Lecouna; Cristina Valdivielso; Luis Brandoni; Juan Echanove; Carlos Hipólito; Jorge Marrale
- Cinematography: Juanmi Aspiroz
- Edited by: Teresa Font
- Music by: Xavier Capellas
- Production companies: Iroko Films; Nada Music; Quiéreme Produccione; Infinity Films; Kompel Producciones; Exponencial
- Distributed by: A. Zeta Cinema
- Release dates: 19 October 2007 (Spain); 15 November 2007 (Argentina)
- Countries: Spain; Argentina
- Language: Spanish

Quiéreme is a 2007 Spanish-Argentine drama film written and directed by Beda Docampo Feijóo. It stars Darío Grandinetti alongside Kira Miró, Ariadna Gil, Agustina Lecouna, and Cristina Valdivielso.

== Plot ==
Fiftysomething cook Pancho's life in Buenos Aires with his new girlfriend Rita takes a wild turn when a Spanish girl named Amparo claiming to be her granddaughter knocks at his door. He is forced to deal with his past in Spain, going to Madrid, where he tries to find Lucía, Pancho's daughter and Amparo's mother.

== Cast ==
- Darío Grandinetti as Pancho
- Cristina Valdivielso as Amparo
- Agustina Lecouna as Rita
- Kira Miró as Lucía
- Ariadna Gil as Consuelo
- Jorge Marrale as Roberto
- Luis Brandoni as Polo
- Juan Echanove as Jaime
- Carlos Hipólito as Isidro

== Production ==
The film is a Spanish-Argentine co-production by Iroko Films, Nada Music, Quiéreme Producciones, Infinity Films, Kompel Producciones and Exponencial. Filming began on 8 October 2006. Shooting locations included Madrid, Buenos Aires, Ciudad de la Luz (Alicante), and Sitges.

== Release ==
Quiéreme was released theatrically in Spain on 19 October 2007. It was released theatrically in Argentina on 15 November 2007.

== Reception ==
Adolfo C. Martínez of La Nación gave the film a 'very good' rating, writing about how Docampo endows the film with "enormous warmth and tenderness".

Juan Pablo Cinelli of Página/12 assessed that the film rounds off "an effective narrative and, above all, tells a concrete and complete story", while pointing out that the sense of derivativeness from other works hovers around over the course of the film.

== See also ==
- List of Spanish films of 2007
- List of Argentine films of 2007
