= The Dark Side of the Heart =

1992 film

- Film poster
- Directed by: Eliseo Subiela
- Written by: Eliseo Subiela
- Based on: Selected poems by Oliverio Girondo; Mario Benedetti; Juan Gelman
- Produced by: Suzanne Dussault; Roger Frappier; Susana Serebrenik; Fernando Sokolowicz
- Starring: Darío Grandinetti; Sandra Ballesteros; Nacha Guevara
- Cinematography: Hugo Colace
- Edited by: Marcela Sáenz
- Music by: Mario Clavell; Osvaldo Montes; Chico Novarro; Fito Páez
- Production companies: CQ3 Films; Instituto Nacional de Cine y Artes Audiovisuales (INCAA); Max Films Productions
- Release date: 21 May 1992
- Running time: 127 minutes
- Country: Argentina
- Language: Spanish

The Dark Side of the Heart (Spanish: El lado oscuro del corazón) is a 1992 Argentine romantic drama film written and directed by Eliseo Subiela. The film was selected as the Argentine entry for the Best Foreign Language Film at the 65th Academy Awards, but was not accepted as a nominee. It is currently considered a cult film.

== Plot ==
Oliverio, a Bohemian poet, travels through Buenos Aires with his friends, harassed by Death, looking for a woman capable of “flying”. In the course of the film, the poetry of Mario Benedetti, Juan Gelman and Oliverio Girondo is seen intermingled with the thickest places of Argentine and Uruguayan artistic daily life. From the barbecue, to the battered bars of Buenos Aires and Montevideo, the main character's thought is intermittently intertwined with fiction, only to be able to better show the central character's thinking.

The story unfolds in the comings and goings of Oliverio, through his world, in which, exchanging food for poetry, or asking for coins on street corners, seeing Mario Benedetti reciting his poems in German, seeing Genetic sculptures, talking to cows, and conversing with death seem to be part of any given day in the life of a poet.

== Cast ==
- Darío Grandinetti as Oliverio
- Sandra Ballesteros as Ana
- Nacha Guevara as Death
- André Melançon as Erik
- Jean Pierre Reguerraz as Gustavo
- Mónica Galán as the ex-wife
- Inés Vernengo as the blind girl

== Awards ==
Montreal World Film Festival

- Grand Prix des Amériques

Biarritz Film Festival

- Best Actor
- Best Actress

Huelva Ibero-American Film Festival

- Critic Award

Havana Film Festival

- Best Actor

Argentine Academy of Cinematography Arts and Sciences Awards

- Best Director
- Best Cinematography
- Best Art Direction
- Best Editing

43rd Berlin International Film Festival

- Jury Award of the Readers of the Berliner Zeitung newspaper, International Forum of Young Cinema

Cartagena Film Festival

- Best Director
- Best Cinematography
- Critics Jury Award

Cinoche International Film Festival of Baie-Comeau

- Best Screenplay

Festival du film de Sept-Îles

- Best Film

Silver Condor, Argentine Film Critics Association

- Best Director
- Best Cinematography
- Best Art Direction
- Best Female Revelation

Bergamo Film Meeting

- "Rosa Camuna" Award for Best Film

Sin Cortes Awards

- Best film
- Best Screenplay
- Best Art Direction
- Best Original Music Score
- Best Female Revelation

Argentores Awards

- Best Film Book

Festival de Gramado

- Best Director
- Best Actor
- Best Original Music Score

== Sequel ==
A sequel titled The Dark Side of the Heart 2 was released on July 5, 2001. A Spanish-Argentine co-production, it was again written and directed by Eliseo Subiela, with Darío Grandinetti and Sandra Ballesteros reprising their roles from the original film. The supporting cast includes Ariadna Gil, Manuel Bandera, Carolina Peleritti and Nacha Guevara.

== See also ==
- List of submissions to the 65th Academy Awards for Best Foreign Language Film
- List of Argentine submissions for the Academy Award for Best Foreign Language Film
- A Place in the World
