= Amo tu cama rica =

- Theatrical release poster
- Directed by: Emilio Martínez-Lázaro
- Written by: Emilio Martínez-Lázaro; Martín Casariego; David Trueba
- Starring: Pere Ponce; Ariadna Gil
- Cinematography: José Luis López Linares
- Music by: Michel Camilo
- Production companies: Fernando Trueba PC; Kaplan S.A
- Distributed by: United International Pictures
- Release date: 31 January 1992 (Spain)
- Country: Spain
- Language: Spanish

Amo tu cama rica is a 1992 Spanish romantic comedy film directed and co-written by Emilio Martínez-Lázaro, which stars Ariadna Gil and Pere Ponce. The film helped to launch the acting career of a young Ariadna Gil.

== Plot ==
The fiction tracks the up and downs on the relationship between Pedro and Sara.

== Cast ==
- Pere Ponce as Pedro
- Ariadna Gil as Sara
- Cassen as padre
- Lina Canalejas as madre
- Clara Sanchís as Albertina
- Nancho Novo as Ramón
- Fernando Vivanco as jefe
- Ayanta Barilli as Inés
- Javier Bardem as Antonio
- Cayetana Guillén as Lola

== Production ==
Amo tu cama rica was co-written by the director Emilio Martínez-Lázaro alongside Martín Casariego and David Trueba. The score was composed by Michel Camilo. Ariadna Gil and Pere Ponce joined the cast as leads after a three-month-long casting of young actors across Spain. José Luis López Linares took over cinematography duties. Produced by Fernando Trueba PC and Kaplan S.A, filming began by April 1991 in Madrid.

== Release ==
The film was theatrically released in Spain on 31 January 1992.

== Awards and nominations ==
Year	Award	Category	Nominee(s)	Result	Ref.
1992	39th Ondas Awards	Best Film Performers	Pere Ponce & Ariadna Gil	Won	

== See also ==
- List of Spanish films of 1992
