= Don't Look Down (2008 film) =

- Directed by: Eliseo Subiela
- Written by: Eliseo Subiela
- Produced by: Daniel Pensa
- Starring: Antonella Costa; Leandro Stivelman; Hugo Arana; Mónica Galán
- Cinematography: Sol Lopatín
- Edited by: Marcela Sáenz
- Music by: Pedro Aznar
- Release dates: March 2008 (Guadalajara Film Festival); 7 March 2010
- Running time: 85 minutes
- Country: Argentina
- Language: Spanish

Don't Look Down (Spanish: No mires para abajo) is a 2008 Argentine fantasy-erotic drama film written and directed by Eliseo Subiela and starring Antonella Costa and Leandro Stivelman. The allegorical story portrays a young man in mourning who takes to sleep-walking, falls into a girl’s bed through her skylight, and accepts her literally transporting lessons in intimacy.

== Plot summary ==
19-year-old Eloy works with his parents in the family business, assigning tombstones and ornamental figures at burials in the city cemetery. After his father's death Eloy is suddenly forced to grow up quickly in a world he finds hostile and alien. One day he meets Elvira, a young Andalusian girl, who introduces him to sexual practices that will lead him to uncover unknown areas of his spirit and reality. Elvira invites Eloy to become her lover and teaches him Tantric sex, first helping Eloy to discover bliss and eventually to grow as a person.

== Cast ==
- Antonella Costa as Elvira
- Leandro Stivelman as Eloy
- Hugo Arana as Padre de Eloy
- Mónica Galán as Ana

== Reception ==
Dan Fainaru of Screen Daily wrote that "Most audiences will probably go along for the ride mainly for the piquant stuff on the menu, though they are ultimately bound to be as sceptical about the higher concepts of it all as Eloy's brother is when he's told about the 'magical' experiences of his sibling."
