= Norah Lange =

Argentine author (1905–1972)

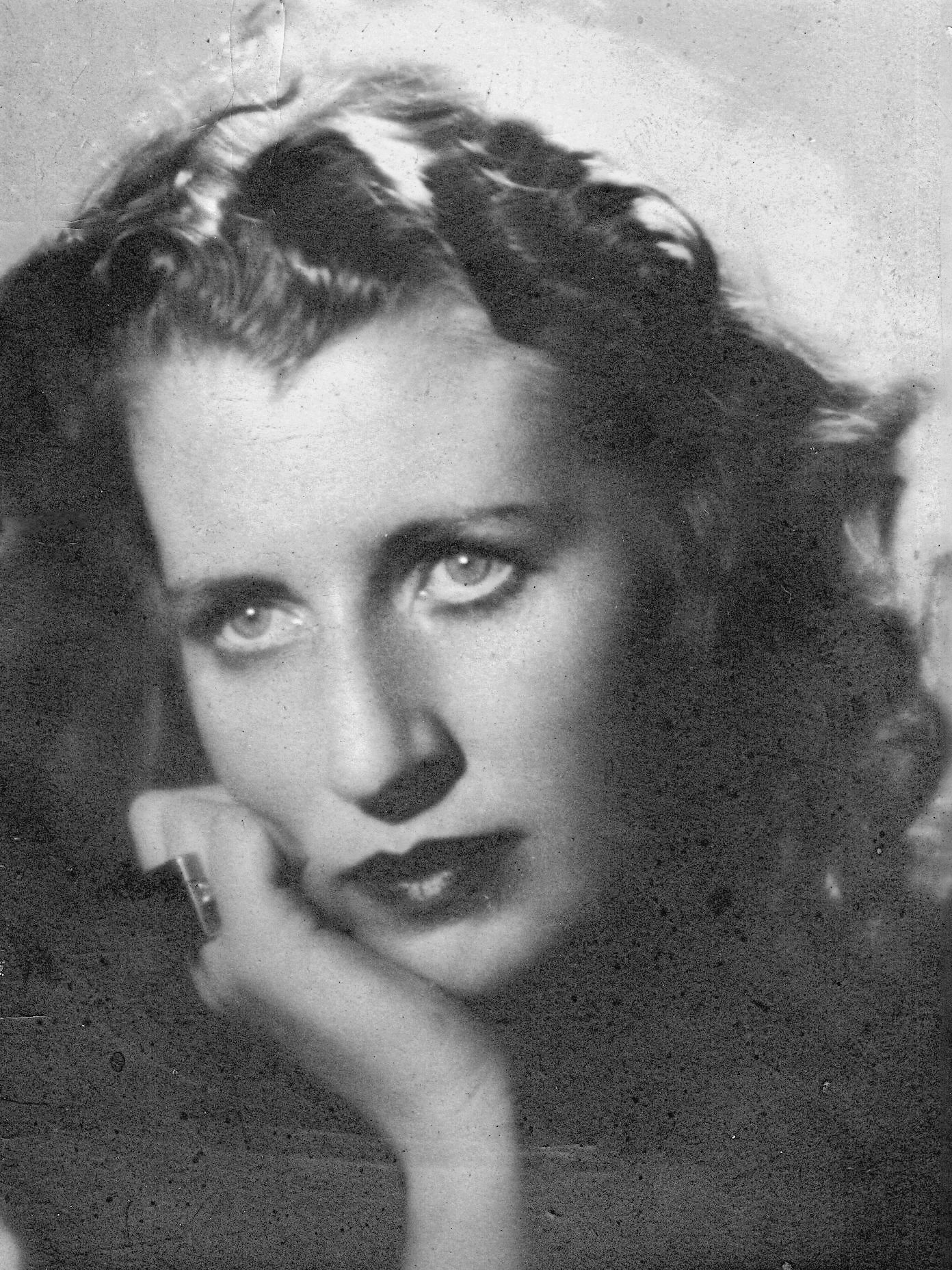
- Born: Nora Lange; 23 October 1905; Buenos Aires, Argentina
- Died: 5 August 1972 (aged 66); Buenos Aires, Argentina
- Occupation: Author

Norah Lange (23 October 1905 – 5 August 1972) was an Argentine writer, who was associated with the Buenos Aires avant garde of the 1920s and 1930s.

== Life ==
A member of the Florida group, which also included figures such as Oliverio Girondo (whom she married in 1943) and Jorge Luis Borges (who dedicated an article to her in his first book of prose, Inquisiciones), she published in the "ultraist" magazines Prisma, Proa, and Martín Fierro.

Her ultra-modernist poetry influenced other well-known Argentine writers such as Nydia Lamarque, Maria Elena Walsh, Maria Dhialma Tiberti, and Ines Malinow.

Her 1950 novel Personas en la sala was published in English as People in the Room (trans. Charlotte Whittle) by the publisher "And Other Stories" in 2018.

In 1959, SADE (the Argentine Society of writers) awarded her their Grand Prize of Honour. This was the same award that Jorge Luis Borges had been given in 1944 but his work has remained more popular and in print. It has been proposed that she has been mistakenly seen as (just) a muse and not as a leading author.

== Works ==
=== Poetry ===
- La calle de la tarde (The Street in the Evening, 1925), with a prologue by Borges
- Los días y las noches (Days and Nights, 1926)
- El rumbo de la rosa (1930)

=== Prose ===
- Voz de la vida (The Voice of Life, 1927), novel
- 45 días y 30 marineros (45 Days and 30 Sailors, 1933), novel
- Cuadernos de infancia (Childhood Notebooks, 1937), autobiographical work, received the Buenos Aires Municipal Prize and the Argentine National Second Prize.
- Discursos (Speeches, 1942), speeches
- Antes que mueran (Before They Die, 1944), autobiographical work
- Personas en la sala (People in the Room, 1950), novel
- Los dos retratos (The Two Portraits, 1956), novel
- Estimados congéneres
