= Elvia Andreoli =

Argentine actress (died 2020)

- Born: 4 January 1950 or 2 January 1951
- Died: 28 March 2020 (aged 69 or 70)
- Years active: 1965–1998

Elvia Andreoli (4 January 1950 or 2 January 1951 – 28 March 2020) was an Argentine film actress of Sicilian, Jewish and Spanish descent. She appeared in over 30 films between 1965 and 1998.

She starred in films such as Aquellos años locos (1971), Así no hay cama que aguante (1980), Atrapadas (1984), Apartment Zero (1998) and Asesinato a distancia (1998). She died on 28 March 2020.

== Filmography ==
- Asesinato a distancia (1998) .... Regina
- Minuto, treinta y dos segundos, Un (1992) (TV)
- Prisioneras del Terror (1991) (not released)
- Apartment Zero (1988) .... Adrian's Mother
- Sentimientos: Mirta de Liniers a Estambul (1987)
- Obsesión de venganza (1987)
- "Valeria" (1987) TV Series .... Deborah
- Sin querer, queriendo (1985)
- Telo y la tele, El (1985)
- "Rossé" (1985) TV Series .... Beatriz
- Atrapadas (1984) .... Olga
- ... aka Condemned to Hell (USA)
- "Amo y señor" (1984) TV Series .... Nora
- ¿Somos? (1982)
- ... aka Are We? (USA)
- Departamento compartido (1980)
- A los cirujanos se les va la mano (1980)
- Así no hay cama que aguante (1980)
- Noche viene movida, La (1980)
- Las Muñecas que hacen pum (1979)
- Aquellos años locos (1971) (as Elvia Evans)
- ¡Qué noche de casamiento! (1969) (as Elvia Evans)
- La Cama (1968) (as Elvia Evans)
- La Casa de Madame Lulù (1968) (as Elvia Evans)
- Coche cama alojamiento (1968) .... Bailarina
- Mannequín... alta tensión (1968)
- Escándalo en la familia (1967)
- Ritmo nuevo y vieja ola (1965)
