= The Mud Boy =

- Theatrical release poster
- Spanish: El niño de barro
- Directed by: Jorge Algora
- Written by: Christian Busquier; Jorge Algora; Héctor Carré
- Produced by: Susana Maceiras; Harold Sánchez; Fernando Blanco; Adrián Suar; Julio Fernández
- Starring: Maribel Verdú; Daniel Freire; Chete Lera; Juan Ciancio
- Cinematography: Suso Bello
- Edited by: Rita Romero
- Music by: Nani García
- Production companies: Adivina Producciones; Iroko Films; Castelao Producciones; Pol-ka Producciones; Patagonik; Televisión de Galicia
- Distributed by: Filmax (es); Buena Vista International (ar)
- Release dates: 18 May 2007 (Spain); 6 September 2007 (Argentina)
- Countries: Spain; Argentina
- Language: Spanish

The Mud Boy (Spanish: El niño de barro) is a 2007 Spanish-Argentine thriller drama film directed by Jorge Algora which stars Maribel Verdú, Daniel Freire, Chete Lera, and Juan Ciancio.

== Plot ==
Set in 1912 Buenos Aires against the backdrop of the story of the Petiso Orejudo serial killer, the plot tracks 10-year-old boy Mateo, haunted by nightmares, and the main suspect behind a trail of brutal killings in the city.

== Cast ==
- Maribel Verdú as Estela
- Chete Lera as Dr. Soria
- Daniel Freire as Comisario Petrie
- Juan Ciancio as Mateo
- César Bordón as Octavio
- Abel Ayala as Cayetano
- Sergio Boris as Subinspector Palacios

== Production ==
A Spanish-Argentine co-production, the film was produced by Adivina Producciones, Iroko Films, Castelao Producciones and Televisión de Galicia, Patagonik and Pol-ka, with backing from INCAA and ICAA. The film was shot in Argentina.

== Release ==
The film was released theatrically in Spain on 18 May 2007. Distributed by Buena Vista, the opening in Argentine theatres was scheduled for 6 September 2007.

== Reception ==
Juan Pablo Cinelli of Página/12 assessed that Algora is right to opt for fiction rather than documentary accuracy.

Jonathan Holland of Variety considered that "the excesses of the story are reined in by intelligent treatment, with thoughtful perfs, fine period atmospherics and a well-achieved sense of dread making up for occasionally clunky direction and loose scripting".

Parana Sendrós of Ámbito Financiero deemed the film to be worth your time, considering that the balance is positive "due to the way [the film] is made, the intelligence with which it tells the story, and the light it sheds on the always current issue of the treatment of children".

== Accolades ==
Year	Award	Category	Nominee(s)	Result	Ref.
2008	22nd Goya Awards	Best Original Song	"Pequeño paria" by Daniel Melingo	Nominated	
2008	7th Mestre Mateo Awards	Best Film		Won	
2008	7th Mestre Mateo Awards	Best Director	Jorge Algora	Won	
2008	7th Mestre Mateo Awards	Best Screenplay	Jorge Algora, Christian Busquier, Héctor Carré	Won	
2008	7th Mestre Mateo Awards	Best Actress	Maribel Verdú	Nominated	
2008	7th Mestre Mateo Awards	Best Actor	Chete Lera	Won	
2008	7th Mestre Mateo Awards	Best Actor	Daniel Freire	Nominated	
2008	7th Mestre Mateo Awards	Best Actor	Juan Ciancio	Nominated	
2008	7th Mestre Mateo Awards	Best Supporting Actor	Abel Ayala	Nominated	
2008	7th Mestre Mateo Awards	Best Production Supervision	Eduard Vallés, Juan Lovece	Nominated	
2008	7th Mestre Mateo Awards	Best Cinematography	Suso Bello	Won	
2008	7th Mestre Mateo Awards	Best Editing	Rita Romero	Nominated	
2008	7th Mestre Mateo Awards	Best Music	Nani García	Won	
2008	7th Mestre Mateo Awards	Best Makeup and Hairstyles	Beata Wojtowicz	Won	
2008	7th Mestre Mateo Awards	Best Costume Design	Cecilia Monti	Won	
2008	7th Mestre Mateo Awards	Best Art Direction	Mariela Rípodas	Won	
2008	7th Mestre Mateo Awards	Best Sound	Perfecto de San José Prieto, Alberto Suárez	Nominated	

== See also ==
- List of Spanish films of 2007
- List of Argentine films of 2007
