= Maradona: Blessed Dream =

Argentinian television series

- Maradona, sueño bendito
- Genre: Biographical; Drama
- Directed by: Alejandro Aimetta
- Starring: Juan Palomino; Nazareno Casero; Nicolás Goldschmidt; Julieta Cardinali; Mercedes Morán; Leonardo Sbaraglia; Marcelo Mazzarello; Pepe Monje; Peter Lanzani
- Country of origin: Argentina
- Original language: Spanish
- No. of seasons: 1
- No. of episodes: 10

Production
- Producers: Rodrigo Cala; Ricardo Coeto; Francisco Cordero; Lluís Malet; Pierpaolo Verga
- Editors: Ariel Frajnd; Anabela Lattanzio; Mariano Saban
- Production companies: BTF Media; Dhana Media; Raze

Original release
- Release: October 29, 2021

Maradona, sueño bendito (English: Maradona: Blessed Dream) is a biographical drama television series. The series stars Juan Palomino, Nazareno Casero, Nicolás Goldschmidt, Julieta Cardinali, Laura Esquivel, Mercedes Morán, Peter Lanzani, Leonardo Sbaraglia, Marcelo Mazzarello, and Pepe Monje. Before the series premiere, it was confirmed that the series was originally renewed for a second 10-episode season. The series premiered on October 29, 2021 on Amazon Prime Video. In 2022, it was revealed that the second season had been delayed because Claudia Villafañe and Guillermo Coppola were suing for over $10 million in damages. They claimed they were not allowed to review the scripts for the first season of the series and, therefore, did not sign the necessary releases for those parts of their lives to be shown. In 2024, according to actor Nazareno Casero, a second season was scrapped due to his inability to resolve the legal issues.

== Synopsis ==
Maradona: Blessed Dream follows the controversial life of notable footballer Diego Armando Maradona. A boy from Argentina with a dream of greatness, made his mark in the international football league. Living a life strewn with drugs, sex and public scrutiny, he played by his own rules regardless of the consequence.

== Cast ==
=== Main ===
- Juan Palomino as Diego Maradona
  - Nazareno Casero as young Diego Maradona
  - Nicolás Goldschmidt as teenage Diego Maradona
  - Juan Cruz Romero as child Diego Maradona
- Julieta Cardinali as Claudia Villafañe
  - Laura Esquivel as young Claudia Villafañe
- Mercedes Morán as Dalma Salvadora Franco "Doña Tota"
  - Rita Cortese as old Doña Tota
- Pepe Monje as Diego Maradona Padre "Don Diego"
  - Claudio Rissi as old Don Diego
- Leonardo Sbaraglia as Guillermo Coppola
  - Jean Pierre Noher as old Guillermo Coppola
- Darío Grandinetti as César Menotti
- Nicolás Furtado as Daniel Passarella
- Marcelo Mazzarello as Carlos Bilardo
- Eva De Dominici as Lorena Gaumont
- Federico D'Elía as Fernando Signorini
- Tea Falco as Cristiana Sinagra
- Martín Piroyansky as Ricardo Suárez
- Peter Lanzani as Jorge Cyterszpiler

=== Recurring ===
- Gerardo Romano as Carlos Ferro Viera
- Fernán Mirás as Francis Cornejo
- Giovanni Esposito as Corrado Ferlaino
- Francesc Orella as José Luis Núñez, president of F. C. Barcelona
- Leonard Kunz as Bernd Schuster
- Richard Sammel as Udo Lattek
- Riccardo Scamarcio as Carmine Giuliano
- Mauricio Dayub as Roque Villafañe
- Douglas Silva as Pelé
- Inés Palombo as Marílu
- Natalia Dal Molín as María Rosa "Mary" Maradona
- María Onetto as Mother of the Plaza de Mayo
- Esteban Recagno as Jorge Carrascosa
- Gabriel Schultz as Yayo Trotta
- Aarón Balderi as Peón
- Diego Martín Vásquez as Dr. Pastoni
- Antonio Braucci as Giuseppe Bruscolotti
- Romina Ricci
- Stefanía Roitman
- Mario Guerci as Jorge Taiana
- Maximiliano Ghione
- Osqui Guzmán
- Diego Alonso Gómez as Osvaldo
- Daniel Leonardo Quinteros as Capataz

== Episodes ==
=== Season 1 (2021) ===
No.	Title	Directed by	Written by	Original release date
1	"Promise" (Promesa)	Alejandro Aimetta	Silvina Olschansky, Guillermo Salmerón & Alejandro Aimetta	October 29, 2021
2	"Dictation" (Dictado)	Alejandro Aimetta	Silvina Olschansky, Guillermo Salmerón & Alejandro Aimetta	October 29, 2021
3	"Machine" (Máquina)	Alejandro Aimetta	Silvina Olschansky, Guillermo Salmerón & Alejandro Aimetta	October 29, 2021
4	"South American" (Sudaca)	Alejandro Aimetta & Roger Gual	Silvina Olschansky, Guillermo Salmerón & Alejandro Aimetta	October 29, 2021
5	"Broken" (Roto)	Alejandro Aimetta & Roger Gual	Silvina Olschansky, Guillermo Salmerón & Alejandro Aimetta	October 29, 2021
6	"Vesuvius" (Vesubio)	Alejandro Aimetta & Eddardo De Angelis	Silvina Olschansky, Guillermo Salmerón & Alejandro Aimetta	November 5, 2021
7	"Free" (Libre)	Alejandro Aimetta & Eddardo De Angelis	Silvina Olschansky, Guillermo Salmerón & Alejandro Aimetta	November 5, 2021
8	"Cristiana (Note: The title should not be translated into English, because it refers to Cristiana Sinagra.)" (Cristiana)	Alejandro Aimetta & Eddardo De Angelis	Silvina Olschansky, Guillermo Salmerón & Alejandro Aimetta	November 12, 2021
9	"Captain" (Capitán)	Alejandro Aimetta	Silvina Olschansky, Guillermo Salmerón & Alejandro Aimetta	November 19, 2021
10	"God" (Dios)	Alejandro Aimetta	Silvina Olschansky, Guillermo Salmerón & Alejandro Aimetta	November 25, 2021

== Production ==
=== Development ===
In 2018, it was reported that Amazon Prime Video was developing a biographical series based on Diego Maradona's life. The series is written by Guillerno Salmerón and Silvina Olschansky and directed by Alejandro Aimetta.

=== Filming ===
In 2019, the series was filmed in places such as Argentina, Barcelona, Naples, Seville, Italy and Mexico.

== Release ==
The series premiered on Amazon Prime Video on October 29, 2021.
