= Nuts for Love =

- Directed by: Alberto Lecchi
- Starring: Ariadna Gil; Gastón Pauls
- Edited by: Alejandro Alem
- Release date: 10 August 2000
- Running time: 1h 43min
- Country: Argentina
- Language: Spanish

Nuts for Love (Spanish: Nueces para el amor) is a 2000 Argentine drama film, directed by Alberto Lecchi.

== Cast ==
- Ariadna Gil - Alicia
- Gastón Pauls - Marcelo
- Malena Solda - Alicia de joven / Cecilia
- Nicolás Pauls - Marcelo de joven
- Nancy Dupláa - Claudia
- Gabriel Goity - Médico
- Rodrigo De la Serna - Armando
