= Alejandro Fiore =

Argentine actor

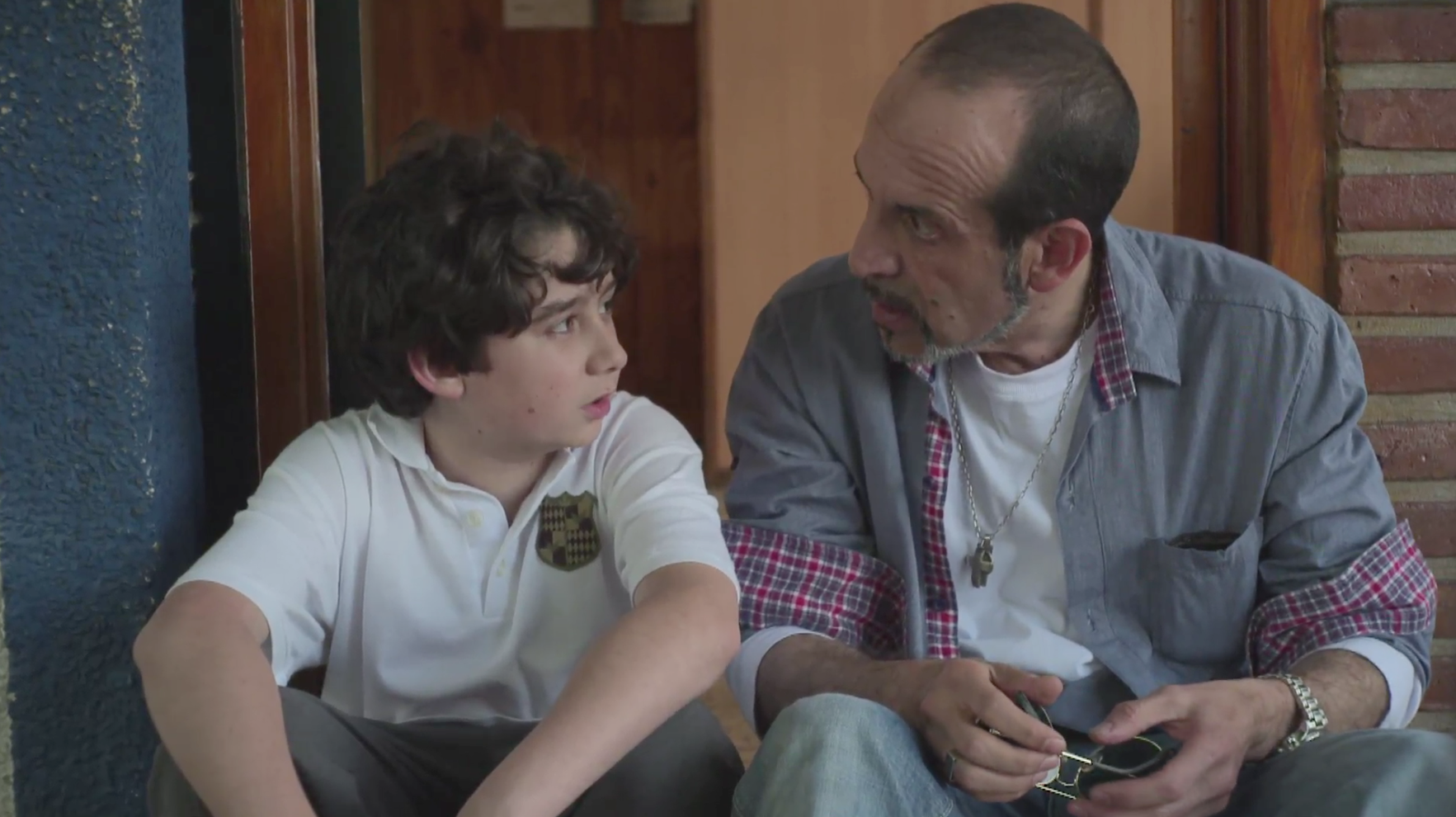
A portrait of Alejandro Fiore

Alejandro Fiore (born July 5, 1969) is an Argentine actor. He has worked in Los Simuladores, a miniseries that received the Golden Martín Fierro award.
