= Gene Brewer =

American novelist

- Born: Gene R. Brewer; July 4, 1937 (age 89); Muncie, Indiana, U.S.
- Education: DePauw University; University of Wisconsin–Madison
- Occupation: Novelist
- Writing career
- Genre: Science fiction

Gene Brewer (born Gene R. Brewer, July 4, 1937) is an American writer, the author of the K-PAX book series, about a man who claims to be a visiting extraterrestrial from a planet called K-PAX: K-PAX (novel) (1995), On a Beam of Light (2001), K-PAX III: The Worlds of Prot (2002), K-PAX IV (2007) K-PAX V: The Coming of the Bullocks (2014) and Prot's Report, a brief natural history of the Earth, which appears in K-PAX: The Trilogy, an omnibus edition of the first three K-PAX books. The first book in the series was made into a film in 2001, starring Kevin Spacey and Jeff Bridges.

== Biography ==
Brewer was born in Muncie, Indiana.

He was educated at DePauw University and University of Wisconsin–Madison, and he studied DNA replication and cell division, then became a novelist.

Brewer currently lives in New York City and Vermont with his wife.

== Bibliography ==
- K-PAX: The Trilogy (2003). New York: Bloomsbury USA, ISBN 0-7475-6695-X. (Omnibus featuring "Prot's Report")
- En un Rayo de Luz (2003) Umbriel, ISBN 978-8-49561-847-4. (Spanish trans. of On a Beam of Light)
- Creating K-PAX, Or, Are You Sure You Want to Be a Writer? (2005) Xlibris, ISBN 1599264757. A memoir concerning the 2001 lawsuit over the film Man Facing Southeast.
- Murder on Spruce Island: A Louis B. Davenport Mystery (2006), Xlibris, ISBN 978-1-42570-290-8.
- Wrongful Death: A Novel in Dialogue (2006) Xlibris, ISBN 978-1-42571-222-8.
- Ben and I: A Christmas Story (2006) Xlibris, ISBN 978-1-42571-880-0.
- Watson's God: A Novel (2007) Xlibris, ISBN 978-1-42571-892-3.
- K-PAX IV: A New Visitor from the Constellation Lyra (2007) Xlibris, ISBN 978-1-4257-1889-3.
- Three Stories and a Novella: For All Ages (2007) ISBN 978-1-42571-885-5.
- The American Way: A Politically Incorrect Satire (2007), Xlibris, ISBN 978-1-42571-881-7.
- K-Pax Redux: A Play, Screenplay, and a Report (2007) Xlibris, ISBN 978-1-42571-884-8.
- 3 Early Novels (2007), Xlibris, ISBN 978-1-42571-888-6.
- Becoming Human (2013), Xlibris ISBN 978-1-47978-154-6.
- K-PAX V: The Coming of the Bullocks (2014) Xlibris, ISBN 978-1-4990-0481-6.
