= The Adventures of God =

Las Aventuras de Dios
- Directed by: Eliseo Subiela
- Written by: Eliseo Subiela
- Produced by: Victor Catania; Alejandro Galindo
- Starring: Daniel Freire
- Cinematography: Daniel Rodríguez Maseda
- Edited by: Laura Bua
- Music by: Osvaldo Montes
- Distributed by: CQ3 Films; Estudios Darwin; XL Films
- Release date: September 1, 2000
- Running time: 84 minutes
- Country: Argentina
- Language: Spanish

The Adventures of God (Spanish: Las Aventuras de Dios) is a 2000 Argentine fantasy drama film directed and written by Eliseo Subiela and starring Daniel Freire. The film premiered on 1 September 2000 in Canada.

== Main cast ==
- Pasta Dioguardi .... Protagonist
- Flor Sabatella .... Valeri
- Daniel Freire .... Jesus Christ
- Lorenzo Quinteros
- María Concepción César
- José María Gutiérrez
- Walter Balzarini
- Enrique Blugerman

== Other cast ==
- Mariana Arias .... Guest #1
- Victoria Bertone .... Huésped 2
- Ana María Giunta .... Guest 4
- Jorge Lira .... Hombre Boquilla
- Lalo Mir .... Huésped 3
- Pino Paperella .... Sr. Petersen
- Carmen Renard .... Madre en Bolsa
- Sandra Sandrini .... Esposa
