= The Dark Side of the Heart 2 =

- Spanish: El lado oscuro del corazón 2
- Directed by: Eliseo Subiela
- Screenplay by: Eliseo Subiela
- Produced by: Enrique Cerezo; Gerardo Herrero; Luis Alberto Scalella
- Starring: Darío Grandinetti; Ariadna Gil; Nacha Guevara; Sandra Ballesteros; Manuel Bandera; Pepe Novoa; Carolina Peleritti; Santiago Ramos
- Cinematography: Teo Delgado
- Edited by: Juan Carlos Macías
- Music by: Osvaldo Montes
- Production companies: Enrique Cerezo PC; Tornasol Films; Argentina Sonfilm
- Distributed by: Columbia TriStar Films de España (Spain)
- Release dates: 5 July 2001 (Argentina); 5 July 2002 (Spain)
- Countries: Argentina; Spain
- Language: Spanish

The Dark Side of the Heart 2 (Spanish: El lado oscuro del corazón 2) is a 2001 Argentine-Spanish surreal drama film written and directed by Eliseo Subiela, which stars Darío Grandinetti and Ariadna Gil. It is a sequel to 1992 film The Dark Side of the Heart, following on the vicissitudes of the character played by Grandinetti in his search for an ideal woman.

== Plot ==
Hitherto based in Buenos Aires, Argentina, poet Oliverio travels to Barcelona, Spain, to search for prostitute and soulmate Ana. Once there, he meets with circus acrobat Alejandra.

== Cast ==
- Darío Grandinetti as Oliverio
- Ariadna Gil as Alejandra
- Nacha Guevara as La Muerte
- Sandra Ballesteros as Ana
- Pepe Novoa as Paco
- Manuel Bandera as El Muerte
- Carolina Peleritti as Miranda
- Santiago Ramos as Joaquín

== Production ==
The film is an Enrique Cerezo PC, Tornasol Films, and Argentina Sonfilm Argentine-Spanish coproduction. Teo Delgado worked as cinematographer, whereas Osvaldo Montes was responsible for the music and Juan Carlos Macías for editing. Shooting locations included Buenos Aires, Barcelona, and Sitges.

== Release ==
The film premiered on 5 July 2001. It was theatrically released in Spain on 5 July 2002.

== Reception ==
Eddie Cockrell of Variety considered the film to be "a cheeky, sexy, elegant new chapter" in the adventures of the leading character.

== Accolades ==
Year	Award	Category	Nominee(s)	Result	Ref.
2001	27th Huelva Ibero-American Film Festival	Best Director	Eliseo Subiela	Won	
2002	50th Silver Condor Awards	Best Director	Eliseo Subiela	Nominated	
2002	50th Silver Condor Awards	Best Actress	Ariadna Gil	Nominated	
2002	50th Silver Condor Awards	Best Supporting Actress	Sandra Ballesteros	Nominated	

== See also ==
- List of Argentine films of 2001
- List of Spanish films of 2002
