= Black Tears (1998 film) =

- Theatrical release poster
- Spanish: Lágrimas negras
- Directed by: Ricardo Franco; Fernando Bauluz
- Screenplay by: Ricardo Franco; Ángeles González Sinde
- Based on: an original story by Ricardo Franco and Dionisio Pérez Galindo
- Starring: Ariadna Gil; Fele Martínez; Elena Anaya; Ana Risueño; Elvira Mínguez
- Cinematography: Gonzalo Berridi
- Edited by: Esperanza Cobos; Buster Franco
- Music by: Eva Gancedo
- Production companies: Sogetel; Aurum
- Release dates: 28 October 1998 (Seminci); 26 February 1999 (Spain)
- Country: Spain
- Language: Spanish
- Budget: 300 million ₧

Black Tears (Spanish: Lágrimas negras) is a 1998 Spanish romantic drama film directed by Ricardo Franco and Fernando Bauluz. Ricardo Franco's swan song, filming was unfinished upon Franco's death and then completed under assistant director Fernando Bauluz. It stars Ariadna Gil and Fele Martínez alongside Elena Anaya, Ana Risueño and Elvira Mínguez.

== Plot ==
The plot tracks Andrés, a photographer engaged to his long-time girlfriend Alicia who falls romantically for a mentally-ill woman, Isabel (under the guise of 'Ana'), some time after their first encounter when the assault on Andrés by Isabel together with another woman, Cinta—as well as Andrés' ensuing kidnapping, humiliation and rape—took place.

== Cast ==
- Ariadna Gil as Isabel / Ana
- Fele Martínez as Andrés
- Elena Anaya as Alicia
- Ana Risueño as Cinta
- Elvira Mínguez as Marta

== Production ==
The screenplay was penned by Ricardo Franco and Ángeles González Sinde, based on an original story by Ricardo Franco and Dionisio Pérez Galindo. The plot has a backdrop of autobiographical elements reportedly inspired by Ricardo Franco's relationship with Jean Seberg while the latter was married to Romain Gary. Produced by Sogetel and Aurum, the film featured a 300 million ₧ budget. Director Ricardo Franco died in the midst of the shooting and filming was thus completed by assistant director Fernando Bauluz. Shooting wrapped in June 1998 in Portugal. Gonzalo Berridi was responsible for cinematography and Eva Gancedo for the music.

== Release ==
The film screened at the 43rd Valladolid International Film Festival (Seminci) in October 1998. It also screened at the 49th Berlin International Film Festival (Berlinale) in February 1999. It was theatrically released in Spain on 26 February 1999.

== Accolades ==
Year	Award	Category	Nominee(s)	Result	Ref.
1998	43rd Valladolid International Film Festival	Silver Spike for Best Actress	Ariadna Gil	Won	
2000	14th Goya Awards	Best Actress	Ariadna Gil	Nominated	

== See also ==
- List of Spanish films of 1999
