= La Cama =

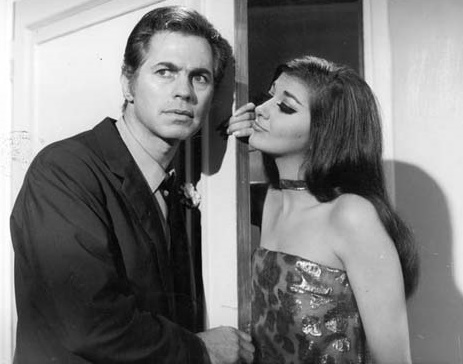
- Still with Jorge Barreiro and Pochi Grey
- Directed by: Emilio Gómez Muriel
- Written by: Alfredo Ruanova
- Starring: Mauricio Garcés; Isela Vega; Lupita Ferrer
- Cinematography: Antonio Merayo; Humberto Peruzzi
- Edited by: Gerardo Rinaldi
- Music by: Lucio Milena
- Production company: Cima Films
- Distributed by: Cinematográfica Pelimex
- Release date: 2 September 1968
- Running time: 88 minutes
- Country: Argentina
- Language: Spanish

La Cama (transl. The Bed) is a 1968 Argentine comedy film directed by Emilio Gómez Muriel.

== Cast ==
- Mauricio Garcés as Charlie
- Isela Vega
- Lupita Ferrer
- Zulma Faiad as Lucy Montes
- Rosángela Balbó as Murcama
- Enrique Rocha
- Marcela López Rey as Ana
- Elvia Andreoli (credited as Elvia Evans)
- Jorge Barreiro as Ramiro Ramos
- Jorge Brisco
- Amparito Castro
- Rafael Chumbito
- Rodolfo Crespi
- María Dolores Pardo
- Mauricio Ferrer
- Susana Ferrer
- Pochi Grey
- Sonia Grey
- Guendolina
- Nancy Lopresti
- Lalo Malcolm
- Miguel A. Olmos
- Vicente Rubino as Hector
- Víctor Tasca
