= Oliverio Girondo =

Argentine poet

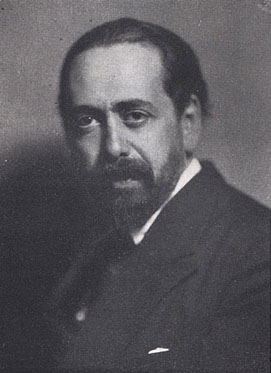
- Oliverio Girondo
- Born: August 17, 1891; Buenos Aires, Argentina
- Died: January 24, 1967 (aged 75); Buenos Aires, Argentina
- Occupation: Poet
- Spouse: Norah Lange
- Writing career
- Literary movement: Neo-Surrealism

Oliverio Girondo (August 17, 1891 – January 24, 1967) was an Argentine poet. He was born in Buenos Aires to a relatively wealthy family, enabling him from a young age to travel to Europe, where he studied in both Paris and England. During the 1920s, he was involved with the avant-garde journal Martín Fierro, which ushered in the arrival of ultraism, the first of the vanguardist movements to settle in Argentina.

His first poems, full of color and irony, surpass the simple admiration of beauty in nature which was then a common theme, opting instead for a fuller and more interesting topic: a sort of celebration of living cosmopolitan and urbane, both praising such a lifestyle and criticizing some of the customs of its society.

Girondo was contemporary to Jorge Luis Borges, Raúl González Tuñón and Macedonio Fernández and Norah Lange (whom he married in 1943) whom he met at a lunch banquet in 1926 held in honor of Ricardo Güiraldes. Of these authors, all also involved in the vanguardia (avant gardism) of Argentina, most identified with the Florida group in the somewhat farcical literary hostility between that group and another called Grupo Boedo. Girondo was one of the most enthusiastic animators of the ultraist movement, exerting influence over many poets of the next generation, among them Enrique Molina with whom he translated the work of Arthur Rimbaud “Una temporada en el infierno.”

Other notable peers include Pablo Neruda and Federico García Lorca with whom he began lasting friendships in 1934, era when both were to be found in Buenos Aires, capital city of Argentina. Around the year 1950 he began painting in the style of surrealism, but he never published or sold any of these works. He was buried in La Recoleta Cemetery in Buenos Aires.

== Works ==
- Veinte Poemas Para Ser Leidos En El Tranvia; Calcomanias; Y Otros Poemas (Coleccion Visor de poesia) (Spanish ed.). Buenos Aires: Visor. 1922. ISBN 978-84-7522-242-4.
- Calcomanías [Stickers] (1925)
- Espantapájaros [Scarecrow] (1932), translated in the collection Scarecrow and Other Anomalies by Gilbert Alter-Gilbert, together with "Interlunio," selected poems and prose poems (Xenos Books).
- Interlunium (1937)
- Persuasion De Los Dias (Biblioteca Clasica Y Contemporanea) (Spanish ed.). Losada. 1942. ISBN 978-950-03-0462-7.
- Campo nuestro [Countryside of ours] (1946)
- En la masmédula [In the masmédula] (1957) . ISBN 978-0-941073-25-7.

Scarecrow & Other Anomalies was translated by Gilbert Alter-Gilbert. Scarecrow inspired the feature film The Dark Side of the Heart (1994), directed by Eliseo Subiela. It is a collection of Girondo's previous books Espantapájaros (Scarecrow), Interlunio (Lunarlude), in addition to selected poems and a manifesto written by Girondo for Martín Fierro.

The last of these, "In the masmédula", his final book was an earnest attempt at absolute expression. Enrique Molina comments: “The very structure of the language he uses suffers the impact of an entirely unfettered poetic energy in this truly unique book. To the point that the words themselves begin to lack separation between them, blurring which are individuals, groups, or other units of comprehension more complex still, he presents a specie of superwords with multiple connotations and multitudinous functions which proceed in a manner tailored just as much to their phonetic associations as to their semantic meaning.” Some critics relate this ultimate gesture of vanguardia (avant gardism) to the work of another, equally desperate constructor and destroyer of language and semanticity: “Trilce”, of the Peruvian author of the same era, César Vallejo.

In the Moremarrow, translated from the Spanish by Molly Weigel (Argentina; Action Books), was shortlisted for the 2014 Best Translated Book Award.

== Trivia ==
Girondo's works are the backbone of The Dark Side of the Heart, a 1992 independent film directed by Eliseo Subiela, in which a poet strives to find the love of his life, defying Death's constant interventions.
