= Pasta Dioguardi =

Argentine film and TV actor (born 1961)

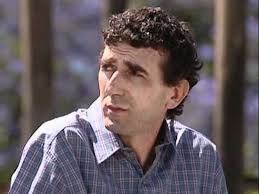
Dioguardi in 2002

Sergio "Pasta" Dioguardi (born 12 December 1961 in Buenos Aires) is an Argentine film and TV actor.

He entered film in Las Aventuras de Dios in 2000 with a major role as the protagonist. Then in 2003 he appeared in the acclaimed film El Fondo del Mar working with Daniel Hendler.

Dioguardi has also appeared in the TV series Los Simuladores.
