= The Absent =

- Theatrical release poster
- Spanish: Ausentes
- Directed by: Daniel Calparsoro
- Screenplay by: Daniel Calparsoro; Ray Loriga; Elio Quiroga
- Produced by: Juan Alexander
- Starring: Ariadna Gil; Jordi Mollà; Nacho Pérez; Omar Muñoz; Mar Sodupe; Alex Brendemühl
- Cinematography: Josep M. Civit
- Edited by: Iván Aledo
- Music by: Carlos Jean
- Production companies: Estudios Picasso; Star Line Productions
- Distributed by: Buena Vista International
- Release date: 16 September 2005
- Country: Spain
- Language: Spanish

The Absent (Spanish: Ausentes) is a 2005 Spanish psychological thriller film directed by Daniel Calparsoro from a screenplay by Calparsoro, Ray Loriga, and Elio Quiroga which stars Ariadna Gil and Jordi Mollà.

== Plot ==
A married middle-class couple (Julia and Samuel) moves with their children to a new estate in the city outskirts, with Julia suffering from anxiety upon settling in what turns out to be a deserted place.

== Cast ==
- Ariadna Gil as Julia
- Jordi Mollà as Samuel
- Nacho Pérez as Félix
- Omar Muñoz as Luis
- Mar Sodupe as María
- Alex Brendemühl

== Production ==
The film is an Estudios Picasso and Star Line production. It was shot in the suburbs of Madrid.

== Release ==
The film was released theatrically in Spain on 16 September 2005.

== Reception ==
Casimiro Torreiro of El País considered that the film holds for around a 95% of its footage but, in the remaining 5%, issues pop up and it becomes clear that cheating has occurred, with the whole experience underpinned by a hard-to-swallow plot device.

== See also ==
- List of Spanish films of 2005
