= K-PAX =

2001 film by Iain Softley

- Theatrical release poster
- Directed by: Iain Softley
- Screenplay by: Charles Leavitt
- Based on: K-PAX by Gene Brewer
- Produced by: Robert F. Colesberry; Lawrence Gordon; Lloyd Levin
- Starring: Kevin Spacey; Jeff Bridges; Alfre Woodard; Mary McCormack
- Cinematography: John Mathieson
- Edited by: Craig McKay
- Music by: Edward Shearmur
- Production companies: Intermedia Films; Lawrence Gordon Productions
- Distributed by: Universal Pictures
- Release date: October 26, 2001
- Running time: 121 minutes
- Country: United States
- Language: English
- Budget: $68 million
- Box office: $65 million

K-PAX is a 2001 American science fiction mystery film starring Kevin Spacey as a psychiatric patient who claims to be an alien from the planet K-PAX and Jeff Bridges as the doctor who investigates his case. It also stars Alfre Woodard and Mary McCormack. It is directed by Iain Softley based on Gene Brewer's 1995 novel K-PAX.

Universal Pictures released the film in theaters in the United States on October 26, 2001. It grossed $65 million in its theatrical run against a $68 million budget and received mixed reviews from film critics.

== Plot ==
A man calling himself “prot” is committed to the Psychiatric Institute of Manhattan after claiming he is an extraterrestrial from the planet 'K-PAX', 1,000 light years away in the Lyra constellation. There, psychiatrist Dr. Mark Powell attempts to cure him of his apparent delusions. However, prot is unwavering in his ability to provide cogent answers to questions about himself, K-PAX, and its civilizations. His medical examination only reinforces his story, as prot can see ultraviolet light and he is completely resistant to the effects of Thorazine. Powell introduces him to a group of astrophysicists who are befuddled when prot displays a highly detailed level of knowledge about the star system he claims to be from and which had previously been unknown to them.

Prot also wins over the other patients at the institute, each of whom believes unquestioningly that he is indeed from K-PAX. Prot, who claims to have journeyed to Earth by means of "faster-than-light travel," explains that he can take a single person with him when he returns. Thereafter, most of the patients at the Institute ask prot to take them with him.

Upon learning that many of his patients expect to leave Earth on July 27, Powell confronts prot, who explains that it is a predetermined date. However, Powell believes this to be a significant date in prot's life, a day on which he suffered severe psychological trauma. Powell decides to subject prot to regression hypnosis, which works well. Using information gained from these sessions, Powell figures out that prot may simply be an alter ego of Robert Porter, a man from New Mexico who had worked as a 'knocker' (animal slaughterer) in a local abattoir, and attempted suicide in 1996, after his wife and child had been murdered by a drifter. Powell tries to confront prot with this knowledge, showing him a photo of Robert Porter in a high school yearbook and stating that it is in fact prot himself; but prot‘s reaction is one of bemusement, and he cryptically tells Powell that he hopes he will take good care of Robert now that he has found him.

On July 27, as the hospital staff watches, the camera in prot‘s room cuts to static at the precise time prot had said he would be departing Earth. A moment later, Powell finds Porter lying on the floor in his room, catatonic, prot having apparently left Porter's body for the light travel back to K-PAX. As Robert is being wheeled out of the room, none of the other patients recognizes him as prot, and claim that prot has left. In addition, one of the patients is missing: Bess, a woman mute since her home had been destroyed in a fire, and who had been among those patients who had asked prot to take them to K-PAX. She is never found again. Remaining patients believe prot had taken her to K-PAX. Powell continues to take care of the catatonic Porter and tells him about how the patients he helped have gone on to live normal lives again, but Robert does not respond. Powell is left with no absolute answer as to whether prot was in fact an alien entity or just a coping mechanism of the traumatized Porter, but seems far from convinced that Porter's behavior was a delusion.

In a final voiceover, prot explains to Powell that the people of K-PAX have discovered that our universe will repeat its events again and again, so the mistakes we make will be repeated forever. Prot encourages Powell to make this time count, as it is the only chance we have. Inspired, Powell begins a new, better life by reconciling with his estranged son Michael.

In a post-credit sequence, Powell watches the night sky before returning to his home.

== Cast ==
- Kevin Spacey as prot / Robert Porter
- Jeff Bridges as Dr. Mark Powell
- Mary McCormack as Rachel Powell
- Alfre Woodard as Dr. Claudia Villars
- David Patrick Kelly as Howie
- Saul Williams as Ernie
- Peter Gerety as Sal
- Celia Weston as Doris Archer
- Ajay Naidu as Dr. Chakraborty
- Tracy Vilar as Maria
- Melanee Murray as Bess
- John Toles-Bey as Russell
- Kimberly Scott as Joyce Trexler
- Conchata Ferrell as Betty McAllister
- Vincent Laresca as Navarro
- Brian Howe as Dr. Steven Becker
- Mary Mara as Abby
- William Lucking as sheriff
- Aaron Paul as Michael Powell
- Norman Alden as babbling man
- Lola Pashalinski as Russian woman

== Production ==
Will Smith was offered the role of prot/Robert Porter. Kevin Spacey was originally offered the role of Dr. Mark Powell, but instead landed the role of prot.

== Reception ==
K-PAX received mixed reviews from critics. On Rotten Tomatoes, it has an approval rating of 42%, based on 141 reviews, with an average rating of 5.10/10. The website's consensus states "For those who have seen One Flew Over the Cuckoo's Nest or Starman, K-PAX may not hold anything new. The movie works best as a showcase for Kevin Spacey and Jeff Bridges." The film has a weighted average score of 49 out of 100 on Metacritic, based on 31 reviews, indicating "mixed or average" reviews. Audiences polled by CinemaScore gave the film an average grade of "B+" on an A+ to F scale.

Roger Ebert of the Chicago Sun-Times gave K-PAX three stars out of four and wrote: "I admired how the movie tantalized us with possibilities and allowed the doctor and patient to talk sensibly, if strangely, about the difference between the delusional and that which is simply very unlikely." A. O. Scott, wrote in The New York Times: "K-PAX is a draggy, earnest exercise in pseudo-spiritual uplift, recycling romantic hokum about extra-terrestrial life and mental illness with wide-eyed sincerity." For Variety, Robert Koehler wrote "'K-PAX' gives off a great deal of light but generates little heat in a drama that aspires to cosmic themes but ends up with plain, comforting homilies." Claudia Puig at USA Today wrote "Besides being saddled with the year's worst title...this misguided movie is shackled by its own overreaching sense of importance and foggy earnestness."

== Box office ==
K-PAX grossed $17.5 million and ranked number 1 in its opening weekend ahead of Warner Bros.' Thirteen Ghosts and 20th Century Fox's From Hell. It plunged into fourth place when Monsters, Inc. was released during its second weekend. The film was a box-office disappointment, making only $65,001,485 worldwide vs. a budget of $68 million, including $50,338,485 in North America and $14,663,000 internationally.

== Home media ==
K-PAX was released on DVD and VHS on March 26, 2002, and on Blu-ray on January 6, 2026.

== Plagiarism lawsuit ==
Argentinian director Eliseo Subiela claimed that K-Pax plagiarized his 1986 film Man Facing Southeast. He said "it's a copy, but a good quality one". Subsequently, Gene Brewer and others connected with K-PAX were sued in November 2001. The complaint was withdrawn because the trial stretched over time and Subiela lacked sufficient funds to continue the litigation. Subiela claimed until his death in late 2016 that his film was plagiarized by the makers of K-PAX.

== Bibliography ==
- Frauley, Jon (2010). "Pathology, Power, and Medicalization in K-Pax". Criminology, Deviance, and the Silver Screen: The Fictional Reality and the Criminological Imagination. New York: Palgrave Macmillan. pp. 156–194. ISBN 9781349378869. OCLC 951516342.

Preceded by From Hell	Box office number-one films of 2001 (USA); October 28	Succeeded by Monsters, Inc.
