= Atrapadas =

- DVD cover
- Directed by: Aníbal Di Salvo
- Written by: Aníbal Di Salvo; José P. Dominiani
- Produced by: Carlos Luis Mentasti; Luis A. Scalella
- Starring: Leonor Benedetto; Betiana Blum; Mirta Busnelli
- Cinematography: Carlos Torlaschi
- Edited by: Darío Tedesco
- Music by: Luis María Serra
- Distributed by: Trans World Entertainment
- Release date: 16 August 1984 (Argentina)
- Running time: 90 minutes
- Country: Argentina
- Language: Spanish

Atrapadas (English: "Trapped"), released as Condemned to Hell, is a 1984 Argentine film written and directed by Aníbal Di Salvo and starring Leonor Benedetto, Betiana Blum, Mirta Busnelli and Juan Leyrado. The story is set in a women's prison.

== Plot ==
In a corrupt women's prison, closely monitored by the inmates, a mafia thrives among the most dangerous prisoners, deceitful guards, and drug traffickers. They collaborate to smuggle drugs into the prison. Silvia (Leonor Benedetto) staunchly refuses to cooperate with Susana (Camila Perissé) when she attempts to involve her in drug trafficking. Consequently, Silvia is punished, and tragically, her younger sister is murdered. Determined, Silvia orchestrates her escape from the prison one night, with the aid of fellow inmates and trustworthy guards. Once free, she embarks on a quest for revenge against the drug traffickers.

== Cast ==
- Leonor Benedetto as Silvia
- Betiana Blum as Martina
- Cristina Murta as La Galíndez
- Camila Perissé as Susana Nieto
- Mirta Busnelli as Graciela González (as Mirtha Busnelli)
- Rita Terranova as Maricarmen
- Juan Leyrado as Daniel
- Mónica Galán
- Esther Goris
- Paulino Andrada
- Susana Cart
- Miriam Perazolo
- Elvia Andreoli ... Olga
- Patricia Bermudez
- Clotilde Borella
- Olga Bruno
- Perla Cristal
- Julio Fedel
- Golde Flami
- Inés Murray ... La Judía
- Carlos Olivieri
- Adriana Parets ... Celadora
- Dorys Perry ... La Rusita
- Gerardo Romano ... Nacho
- Edgardo Suárez ... El Negro
- Hernán Zabala
