= Nazareno Casero =

Argentine film and television actor

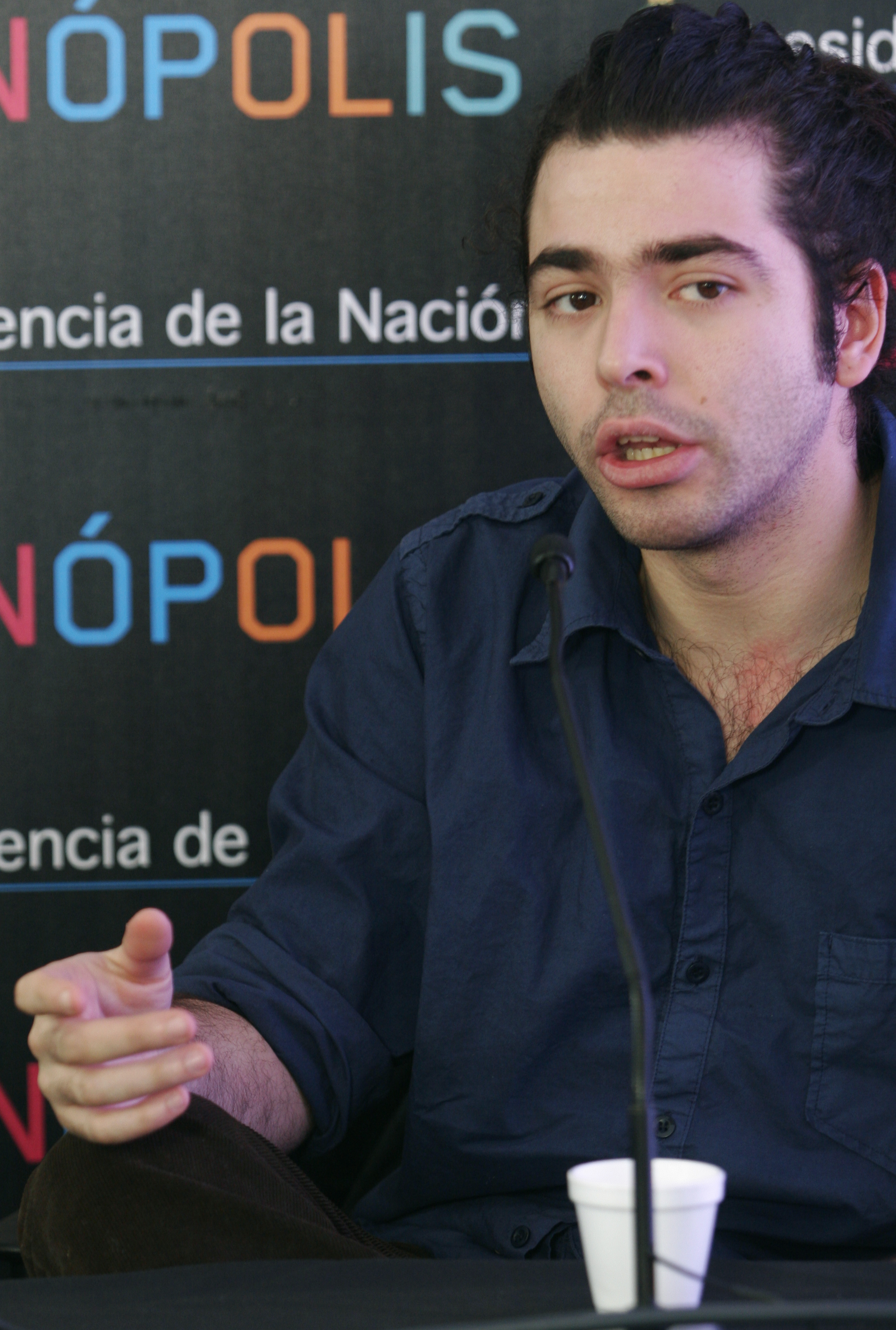
- Born: Nazareno Tomás Casero; June 19, 1986 (age 39); Buenos Aires, Argentina
- Occupation: Actor
- Years active: 1993-present
- Height: 1.73 m (5 ft 8 in)
- Parent(s): Alfredo Casero and Claudia Galar
- Relatives: Minerva Casero (half-sister)

Nazareno Tomás Casero (born June 19, 1986) is an Argentine film and television actor. He works in the cinema of Argentina.

== Biography ==
The son of actor Alfredo Casero, Nazareno started acting in 1996 under the direction of Alejandro Agresti, in Buenos Aires Vice Versa. His role earned him a Silver Condor nomination from the Argentine Film Critics Association Awards in 1998. In 2001, Nazareno landed a regular role in the TV series Culpables, as well as guest starring in Los Simuladores in 2002. This year also marked second feature film, Todas las azafatas van al cielo, which was directed by Daniel Burman and co-starred Casero's father, Alfredo.

In 2004, Nazareno acted 18-j, a homage to the 1994 AMIA bombing on their tenth anniversary. He played a role in the segment La comedia divina, which was directed by Israel Adrián Caetano. A year later, Casero landed his second regular role in the TV series Paraíso Rock.

2006 marked his second Silver Condor nomination for playing the real-life Dirty War victim Guillermo Fernández in Chronicle of an Escape, which also marked his second collaboration with Caetano and co-starred name actors Rodrigo de la Serna and Pablo Echarri. That year he won two Clarin Awards for his role in this film, which was Argentina's entry for the 2007 Golden Globes Awards for the category of Best Foreign Language Film.

After making a guest appearance on the pilot episode of Doble venganza, Casero acted in Arizona sur in 2007, next to Alejandro Awada.

In late 2018, he was cast to portray the late Argentine soccer player Diego Armando Maradona in the upcoming drama series Maradona: Blessed Dream set to premiere later in 2021.

== Filmography ==
- Buenos Aires Vice Versa (1996)
- Todas las azafatas van al cielo (2002)
- Arizona Sur (2004)
- Chronicle of an Escape (2006)
- Aballay (2010)
- Estamos Juntos (2011)

== Television ==
- Culpables (2001)
- Los Simuladores (2002)
- Paraíso Rock (2005) TV Series, (2004)
- Doble venganza TV Episode, (2006)
- Maradona: Blessed Dream (2021)
