= Camera Obscura (2000 film) =

- Directed by: Hamlet Sarkissian
- Written by: Hamlet Sarkissian
- Produced by: Tassos Kazinos
- Starring: Adam Trese; Ariadna Gil; Cully Fredricksen; VJ Foster; Molly Bryant; Kirk Ward
- Cinematography: Haris Zambarloukos
- Edited by: Andrea Zondler
- Distributed by: Fish Eye Films
- Release date: 2000
- Running time: 99 minutes
- Country: United States
- Language: English
- Box office: $11,384 (USA)

Camera Obscura is a 2000 crime film. The film was directed by Hamlet Sarkissian. It stars Adam Trese, Ariadna Gil, Cully Fredricksen, VJ Foster, Molly Bryant and Kirk Ward.
