= Mónica Galán =

Argentine actress (1950–2019)

- Mónica Galán
- Born: October 16, 1950; Buenos Aires
- Died: January 15, 2019 (aged 68); Buenos Aires
- Occupation: actor

Mónica Galán (October 16, 1950 – January 15, 2019) was an Argentine actress. She was a character actor seen on TV, film and in the theatre.

== Life ==
Galán was born in 1950 in Buenos Aires. Galán graduated from the National School of Dramatic Arts and her first film appearance was in Daniel Tinayre's La Mary, starring Susana Giménez and Carlos Monzón in 1974. She went on to appear in other films such as Atrapadas Blue Eyes, Murder in the Senate of the Nation, The side Dark of the Heart, Waiting for the Messiah and The Mural . Her last film was The Other Skin in 2018.

She had said in 1997 that she preferred to be a character actor rather than the star of films or TV dramas. Two years later she directed her first play which was No Be You, by Susana Torres Molina.

She appeared in the 2010 telenovela Malparida

She appeared as Vienna in the 1982 film Last Days of the Victim. That film was proposed but not nominated for Best Foreign Language Film at the List of submissions to the 55th Academy Awards for Best Foreign Language Film. Her role of Vienna was one of 17 where she was cast as a prostitute.

Galán died in Buenos Aires in 2019 having made 70 appearances in film or television.

== Selected filmography ==
- 1974: La Mary
- 1982: Últimos días de la víctima, as Vienna
- 1984: Atrapadas
- 1984: Asesinato en el Senado de la Nación, as Proxeneta
- 1985: Los días de junio
- 1992: Algunas mujeres (cortometraje)
- 1992: El lado oscuro del corazón
- 1992: ¿Dónde estás amor de mi vida que no te puedo encontrar?, as Chela
- 1995: No te mueras sin decirme adónde vas, as Susana
- 1997: El impostor, as Clotilde
- 1997: Bajo bandera, as Paula
- 1997: Pequeños milagros, as Susana
- 1998: Sus ojos se cerraron y el mundo sigue andando,
- 2000: Lejanía
- 2000: Esperando al mesías, as Voz de Elsa
- 2000: Un amor de Borges
- 2001: Cicatrices
- 2001: Cabeza de tigre, as la Perichona
- 2003: Nadar solo, as Lucía
- 2004: Un mundo menos peor, as Isabel
- 2008: Don't Look Down
- 2010: Argentino Vargas, as Alicia
- 2010: El mural, as Victoria Ocampo
- 2018: La otra piel
