= Lorenzo Quinteros =

Argentine actor (1945–2019)

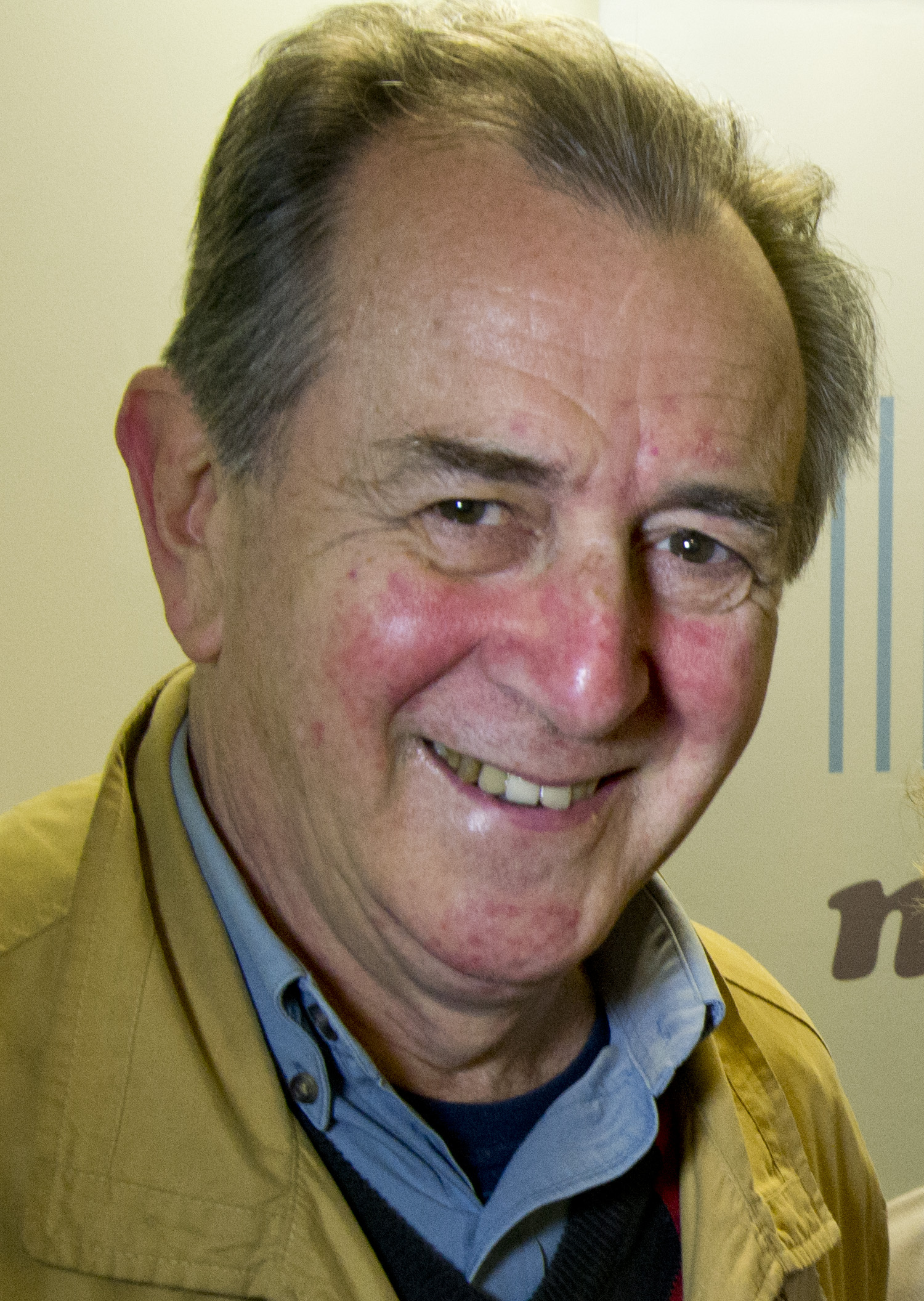
- Quinteros in 2014
- Born: 14 June 1945; Monte Buey, Córdoba Province, Argentina
- Died: 23 April 2019 (aged 73); Buenos Aires, Argentina
- Years active: 1971–2019

Lorenzo Quinteros (14 June 1945 – 23 April 2019) was an Argentine cinema and theatre actor.

Born in Córdoba Province, Quinteros has appeared in many films since his debut in Alianza para el progreso in 1971. His reputation as a talented character actor was established with leading roles in Eliseo Subiela's Hombre mirando al sudeste (Man Facing Southeast, 1986) and Últimas imágenes del naufragio (Last Scenes from the Shipwreck, 1989).

Other notable appearances include Noche de los lápices (1986), Un Muro de Silencio (1993), El Acto en cuestión (1994), Eva Perón (1996), Buenos Aires Vice Versa (1996), Las Aventuras de Dios (2000) and Valentín (2002). Quinteros remains active in the theatre, as well; in 2009, he was cast as the Marquis de Sade in a local production of Swedish playwright Peter Weiss' Marat/Sade.
