= A Wall of Silence =

- Promotional poster
- Directed by: Lita Stantic
- Written by: Graciela Maglie; Gabriela Massuh
- Produced by: Dolly Pussi; Pablo Rovito
- Starring: Vanessa Redgrave; Ofelia Medina; Lautaro Murúa; Lorenzo Quinteros; Soledad Villamil
- Cinematography: Félix Monti
- Edited by: Juan Carlos Macías
- Music by: Néstor Marconi
- Distributed by: Transeuropa
- Release date: 10 June 1993
- Running time: 107 min
- Countries: Argentina; Mexico; United Kingdom
- Language: Spanish

A Wall of Silence (Spanish: Un muro de silencio) is a 1993 drama film starring Vanessa Redgrave. The film depicts a turbulent period in Argentine history, the National Reorganization Process as well as the responsibility of artists in engaging and interpreting human stories from this period. It was directed by Lita Stantic — until then best known as one of Argentina's most prominent film producers — in her feature directorial debut; as of 2026 it remains her only film as director. A co-production between Argentina, Mexico and the United Kingdom, it draws on Stantic's own experience of losing a loved one to the forced disappearances of the dictatorship, and unfolds as a film within a film about the making of a political drama.

The film was released theatrically in Argentina on 10 June 1993 and was screened later that year at the Toronto International Film Festival. It was released as Black Flowers in some English territories. Its screenplay won the Argentine Film Critics Association's Silver Condor Award for Best Original Screenplay in 1994.

== Plot ==
In Buenos Aires in 1990, Kate Benson (Vanessa Redgrave), a British film director, arrives in Argentina to shoot a film set during the last civic-military dictatorship (1976–1983). The screenplay she is directing was written by Bruno Tealdi (Lautaro Murúa), an Argentine former university professor and left-wing intellectual who first met Benson while living in exile, and who argues with her about the mistakes of that era. Kate's film tells the story of Silvia Cassini, who as a young woman (portrayed in Kate's film by Soledad Villamil) lost her husband Juan (Julio Chávez), a Peronist militant who was seized by the security forces and joined the ranks of the "disappeared", leaving her alone with their baby daughter María Elisa (Marina Fondeville).

The present-day life of the real Silvia (Ofelia Medina) bears little resemblance to the film being made about her. Now a sociologist and teacher, she has tried to rebuild her life: her daughter is a teenager, and she lives with a new partner, Ernesto (Lorenzo Quinteros), from whom she has kept her painful past hidden. While Silvia struggles to move on and concentrate on her family, a friend (Rita Cortese) tells her that a film based on her own story is being shot in the city; Bruno, an old friend of hers, never told her about the project or asked her permission.

Seeing her experiences transposed to the screen makes Silvia's hard-won stability collapse. Her memories return with force, bringing back grief and loss and reopening old wounds; she begins to imagine that she sees the missing Juan in the street, and his ghost revives her unresolved search for him. Meanwhile Kate, struggling with how to approach her material and guide her actors, inadvertently becomes the catalyst for the turmoil that follows when she discovers that the woman behind her film is alive, remarried and trying to forget. Silvia is eventually persuaded to relive her painful past, while Kate is forced to confront the ethical questions raised by interpreting another person's suffering for the screen.

== Cast ==
- Vanessa Redgrave as Kate Benson
- Ofelia Medina as Silvia Cassini
- Lautaro Murúa as Bruno Tealdi
- Lorenzo Quinteros as Ernesto
- Soledad Villamil as Ana-Laura
- Julio Chávez as Julio-Patricio
- Marina Fondeville as María Elisa
- Rita Cortese as Silvia's friend
- André Melançon
- Graciela Araujo
- Alberto Segado
- Niní Gambier

== Production ==
=== Development ===
The project was deeply personal for Stantic. Her partner during the 1970s, filmmaker Pablo Szir, the father of her daughter, was kidnapped during the dictatorship and became one of the disappeared. Stantic had the idea for the film as early as 1986, after an experience of working with the British actress Julie Christie on María Luisa Bemberg's Miss Mary, which Stantic produced. Christie came to Argentina intending to stay seven weeks and remained for months, falling in love with the country and setting out to learn about its recent past; this, Stantic recalled, "was the origin of the idea of the English woman who comes to the country to understand what happened here." Following that experience, Stantic began work on the screenplay, which she wrote with historian and screenwriter Graciela Maglie, with the collaboration of Gabriela Massuh.

Visually, the film was influenced by the bleak style of Polish cinema of the late 1950s and early 1960s, which Stantic — together with Italian neorealism — has cited as the strongest formative cinematic experience of her youth.

=== Filming ===
The film was shot in Buenos Aires in 1992. It is a co-production between Argentina's Lita Stantic Producciones and Aleph Producciones, Britain's Channel 4 and Mexico's Instituto Mexicano de Cinematografía (IMCINE), produced by Dolly Pussi with Pablo Rovito as executive producer. Redgrave, sporting short blond hair for the role, performed her part largely in Spanish. It was among the last films of Lautaro Murúa, who had himself been exiled during the dictatorship. The score was composed by bandoneonist Néstor Marconi, with art direction by Margarita Jusid.

The film arrived while the impunity laws shielding military officers from prosecution for crimes committed during the Dirty War were still in force, and it was among the first Argentine productions to openly challenge the then-common notion that society had been largely unaware of the clandestine and systematic repression carried out by the regime.

== Themes ==
Structured as a film within a film, A Wall of Silence alternates scenes from the shooting of Kate's political drama with flashbacks to Silvia's past and episodes of her present-day life, incorporating newsreel footage of the period. Revolving around questions of personal and collective memory, the film suggests that there is no escape from history: sooner or later individuals must come to terms with the most terrible events of their lives. Stantic said she "wanted to talk about memory, about a person who wanted to forget. But memory always returns. And it returns in the most hellish way, with hallucinations," adding that for her "the basic and indeed the only way of keeping one's sanity is to preserve memory." The film is also, in her words, "about secrecy, about hiding," including what Silvia conceals from her daughter, and she described it as "a film in which the process begins when the film ends... a thinker's film."

The film additionally examines the responsibility of artists in interpreting real people's stories for the screen. Stantic noted that the story allowed something long unspoken to be voiced — that many of the disappeared had been kept alive for a time — and said she was proud that many people working in human rights identified with a story "recounted from within."

== Release ==
A Wall of Silence was released theatrically in Argentina on 10 June 1993, distributed by Transeuropa. It screened at the Festival of Festivals in Toronto on 14 September 1993 as part of that year's Toronto International Film Festival. It was released as Black Flowers in some English territories.

== Reception ==
The film was generally well-received, proving to be a success with Argentine film critics. Although this was a period when Argentine film audiences were more enthralled with viewing politics through the gaze of melodrama and rock music. Redgrave was praised for her performance, especially for the striking similarities between her character and her real-life persona as supporter of sometimes unpopular minority causes.

Alejandro Ricagno, writing in El Amante del Cine, praised the film's confidence in its images and the tension between them and the spoken word, observing that the impossibility of reconciling the characters' opposed impulses — "to speak–to stay silent, to remember–to forget" — generates the emotional force underlying both the film and the film within it, and that it "avoids the stereotypes of good victims and bad victims." In the same magazine, Quintín called it "a small piece of private fiction, fed by suspense, narrated in a low voice, laden with ambiguity, free of concessions... This truly is a necessary film." Marcelo Figueras of Clarín wrote that it "speaks of an irritating subject that many people would like to see closed forever, and once settled into it, resorts to none of the cheap tricks that could have made it more commercial," while Daniel López of La Razón found it "surprising for its narrative rigour... at times exasperatingly slow, it takes its time, pauses which can be taken as intervening spaces for reflection." Manrupe and Portela later described it as "a rigorous treatment of the theme of the disappeared, presented from the questioning point of view of a foreign protagonist and with the distance of the years; if not the best film on the subject, at least the most precise and best narrated."

International reviews were more mixed. Emanuel Levy of Variety described the film as "a kind of sequel to the 1985 Oscar-winning The Official Story", tackling the important issue of how individuals deal with traumatic past events, but he criticised its awkward narrative structure, slow pacing and "unexciting direction", finding that the switches between the filming of the political saga and the flashbacks to the real-life counterparts prevented emotional involvement. He judged Redgrave "simply too intelligent to convince as a filmmaker who walks around during rehearsals helplessly, not knowing how to direct her actors," though he credited her "valiant effort to speak in Spanish," and he singled out Medina as the film's "emotional center — and best asset," capturing "the tragic price of historical forgetfulness and the urgent need for remembrance of things past."

=== Accolades ===
At the 1994 Argentine Film Critics Association awards, Graciela Maglie, Gabriela Massuh and Lita Stantic won the Silver Condor for Best Original Screenplay. Redgrave was nominated for Best Actress and Stantic for Best First Film.
