= Kippax =

Kippax may refer to:

- Kippax, West Yorkshire, a village in England
- Kippax Centre, a suburban centre in Canberra, Australia, named after Alan Kippax
- Kippax Plantation, an archaeological site and former home of Robert Bolling and Jane Rolfe in Hopewell, Virginia
- The Kippax, a stand at Manchester City Football Club's Maine Road stadium

== People with the surname ==
- Alan Kippax (1897–1972), Australian cricketer, uncle of H. G. Kippax
- H. G. Kippax (1920–1999), Australian journalist
- Peter Kippax (1940–2017), English cricketer
- Peter Kippax (footballer) (1922–1987), English footballer
- John Kippax the pen name of English science fiction writer John Charles Hynam
- Susan Kippax (born 1941), Australian social psychologist

== See also ==
- KPAX (disambiguation)
