= Man Facing Southeast =

1986 film

- DVD cover
- Directed by: Eliseo Subiela
- Written by: Eliseo Subiela
- Produced by: Luján Pflaum; Hugo E. Lauría
- Starring: Lorenzo Quinteros; Hugo Soto
- Cinematography: Ricardo de Angelis
- Edited by: Luis César d'Angiolillo
- Music by: Pedro Aznar; Andrés Boiarsky
- Production company: Cinequanon Pictures
- Distributed by: Cinemat (Argentina, theatrical); FilmDallas Pictures (1987, USA, subtitled)
- Release date: 9 September 1986 (Toronto Film Festival)
- Running time: 105 minutes
- Country: Argentina
- Language: Spanish
- Budget: $600,000
- Box office: $1.5 million

Man Facing Southeast (Spanish: Hombre mirando al sudeste) is a 1986 Argentine science fiction drama film written and directed by Eliseo Subiela, starring Lorenzo Quinteros and Hugo Soto.

The film was selected as the Argentine entry for the Best Foreign Language Film at the 60th Academy Awards, but was not accepted as a nominee.

The 2001 American film K-PAX bears a strong resemblance to Man Facing Southeast and its filmmakers were the subject of a plagiarism lawsuit by Subiela.

In a survey of the 100 greatest films of Argentine cinema carried out by the Museo del Cine Pablo Ducrós Hicken in 2000, the film reached the 10th position. In a new version of the survey organized in 2022 by the specialized magazines La vida útil, Taipei and La tierra quema, presented at the Mar del Plata International Film Festival, the film reached the 40th position. Also in 2022, the film was included in Spanish magazine Fotogramas's list of the 20 best Argentine films of all time.

== Plot ==
In summer of 1985, at the José Borda Psychiatric Hospital in Buenos Aires, staff psychiatrist Dr. Julio Denis is surprised to find an unidentified patient at the ward for non-violent delusional cases playing the chapel organ proficiently. Summoning him to his office, the patient introduces himself as Rantés (an exotic-sounding name in Argentina) and claims to be a holographic projection from another planet. Dr. Denis speculates that Rantés might be a fugitive hiding from the law but lets him stay after seeing how his caring touch helps the other patients. The doctor is amused by his extraterrestrial claims and suspects that the man is a genius using his talents as a charade.

Denis is a lonely man whose recent divorce left him jaded. Rantés is as interested in his troubles as the doctor is in Rantés, being the first patient in a long time that has interested him. Believing that Rantés' claim of being a projection is an allusion to Adolfo Bioy Casares' classic novel Morel's Invention, Denis concludes that Rantés is very literate. The doctor includes Rantés in several outings, including a visit to a touring Moscow State Circus performance.

Having psychokinetic abilities, Rantés explores the city on his own without permission. He also spends hours standing in one of the asylum's courtyards, motionless, facing southeast. He claims to do this to receive transmissions from his planet and implies that he is Denis' own hallucination. The doctor gets Rantés a job in the pathology department of the hospital. Because of his kindness, he quickly earns the loyalty of the other patients and Denis' respect. The doctor is aware that Rantés has been leaving without permission and has avoided taking his medicine. Nevertheless, he takes Rantés' requests seriously, persuading Dr. Prieto, the head of pathology, to hire him as a volunteer assistant.

Rantés is visited by a young woman, Beatriz, to whom Denis quickly becomes attracted to. She tells Denis of Rantés' work among children in a slum, where they met while working for an evangelical mission, and his devotion to a young child with superior musical abilities. Beyond that, she knows him as a "very good man" whom she is only casually acquainted with. Dr. Denis is charmed by the woman and asks Rantés about her, replying that she is very special.

Beatriz invites them to an outdoor classical concert. During the concert, Rantés becomes entranced by the music as the orchestra plays Beethoven's Ninth Symphony. He persuades the conductor to let him take the baton for the symphony's iconic Ode to Joy. The audience is amused and excited by the situation while at the asylum, the patients get excited and agitated and parade in a state of joy, then go into the town where the concert is being held. The police are about to remove Rantés from the conducting podium when the conductor convinces them not to do so. Rantés finishes and is arrested.

Confronted by the hospital's angry Director, Dr. Denis is less concerned for his job than he is for his impetuous friend, whom the director orders closely monitored and strictly medicated. Dr. Denis fears this could kill Rantés' unique personality and intellect, but the director is unsympathetic and states: "Instead of making the police blotter, next time Rantés goes out he will end up in the front page: LUNATIC ORDERS MILITARY ATTACK", to which Denis quickly and ironically retorts (referring to the Malvinas/Falklands War): "That already happened, and I doubt Rantés had anything to do with it!". Shortly after Rantés, affected by the new medication, broods and becomes rebellious. Denis starts believing that Rantés is disillusioned with humankind and may never recover.

Denis convinces Beatriz to meet at his home, where they have sex. Then she confides to the doctor that she is an alien projection, like Rantés, but assures him that she now feels emotion and can love him. Denis angrily throws her out of his home while accusing her of being a lunatic "like Rantés".

After Rantés starts becoming catatonic, the Director decides to give him electroshock treatment without notifying Denis. Rantés does not endure anesthesia and dies from a heart attack. The rest of the patients do not believe he is dead, as they all hope that he has only gone back to his ship for some time. From then on, the patients wait for Rantés to return and take them to his planet. At the same time Denis, filled with doubts and regrets about Rantés, waits for Beatriz, who is away indefinitely, to return to him.

== Cast ==
- Lorenzo Quinteros as Dr. Julio Denis
- Hugo Soto as Rantés
- Inés Vernengo as Beatriz Dick
- Cristina Scaramuzza as Nurse
- Tomás Voth as Young Suicidal Man
- David Edery as Hospital Director
- Rúbens Correa as Dr. Prieto

== Release and reception ==
A modest box-office draw when released in Argentina in April 1987, Man Facing Southeast received wider acclaim upon its video release later that year. The Secretary of Culture (now the Ministry of Culture) submitted it for consideration to the Academy of Motion Pictures for the 1987 Oscar for Best Foreign Language Film, but the film never made the shortlist of nominees.

On Rotten Tomatoes, the film has a score of 86% based on reviews from 7 critics, with an average rating of 8.3 out of 10.

== K-PAX controversy and influence ==
Little known outside Argentina, Man Facing Southeast received wider exposure upon the 2001 release of Universal Pictures' K-PAX, which was considered by some film enthusiasts and critics to be similar to the Argentine title (whose author and director, Eliseo Subiela, was not credited). Robert Koehler of Variety and Bob Strauss of the Los Angeles Times both expressed surprise at K-PAX author Gene Brewer's contention that Man Facing Southeast was unfamiliar to him.

Film critics at MSNBC, for their part, commented that "both films are quite similar, though Man Facing Southeast is more ingenious and enigmatic". The film was described by Mark R. Leeper as a combination of Nicolas Roeg's The Man Who Fell to Earth and Miloš Forman's One Flew Over the Cuckoo's Nest.

Other critics have highlighted the metaphoric value of Rantés, himself, whose miraculous powers, concern for the poor, frank criticism of human hypocrisy and willingness to subject himself to what amounts to torture create a character with a clear parallel in Christianity.

The 1993 American drama film Mr. Jones, directed by Mike Figgis and starring Richard Gere and Lena Olin, was partially inspired in Man Facing Southeast: in the film's story, Gere's character is a manic-depressive patient in a psychiatric institution, and in one scene the character abruptly jumps the stage at a classical music concert and conducts the orchestra. This scene was directly taken from Man Facing Southeast by Gere's own admission during an interview for Televisión Española, where he stated that the concert scene was "a homage to an Argentine film called Hombre mirando al sudeste".

== See also ==
- Bioy Casares, Adolfo. The Invention of Morel. (short novel; 1940)
- List of submissions to the 60th Academy Awards for Best Foreign Language Film
- List of Argentine submissions for the Academy Award for Best Foreign Language Film

== Notes ==
- Membrez, Nancy J. (ed.) The Cinematic Art of Eliseo Subiela, Argentine Filmmaker. Lewiston, NY: Mellen Press, 2007.
