= Arizona Sur =

Arizona sur
- Theatrical release poster
- Directed by: Daniel Pensa; Miguel Angel Rocca
- Written by: Alan Pauls
- Produced by: Daniel Pensa; Miguel Angel Rocca
- Starring: Nazareno Casero; Daniel Freire; Alejandro Awada
- Cinematography: Andrés Mazzon
- Edited by: Ariel Direse
- Release dates: April 2006 (Uruguay International Film Festival); January 18, 2007
- Running time: 110 minutes
- Country: Argentina
- Language: Spanish

Arizona Sur (lit. 'South Arizona') is a 2006 Argentine comedy film directed and produced by Daniel Pensa and Miguel Angel Rocca and written by Alan Pauls. The film stars Nazareno Casero, Daniel Freire and Alejandro Awada and premiered on 18 January 2007 in Buenos Aires.

== Synopsis ==
A pregnant 70-year-old woman falls into a coma. Her two sons decide to hunt down the man who impregnated her. In this journey the younger of the two brothers makes some observations and has some wild experiences. He discovers that he himself is the son of the absconding father of his would-be sibling. To his astonishment and curiosity he also discovers the gift that this father gives to all his sons: webbed toes. The younger brother, meanwhile, meets an angelic girl and is molested in a betting-house. After that, things get even stranger for the two of them.

== Cast ==
- Nazareno Casero
- Daniel Freire
- Alejandro Awada
- Beatriz Thibaudin
- Marina Glezer
- Christina Banegas
- Carlos Kaspar
- Tito Gómez
- Fernando Llosa ... Mecánico
- María Onetto ... Patrona
- Ruben Surace ... Místico
- Silvia Trawier ... Dueña de hotel
- Alberto Vázquez ... Patrick
