= Ariadna Gil =

Spanish actress

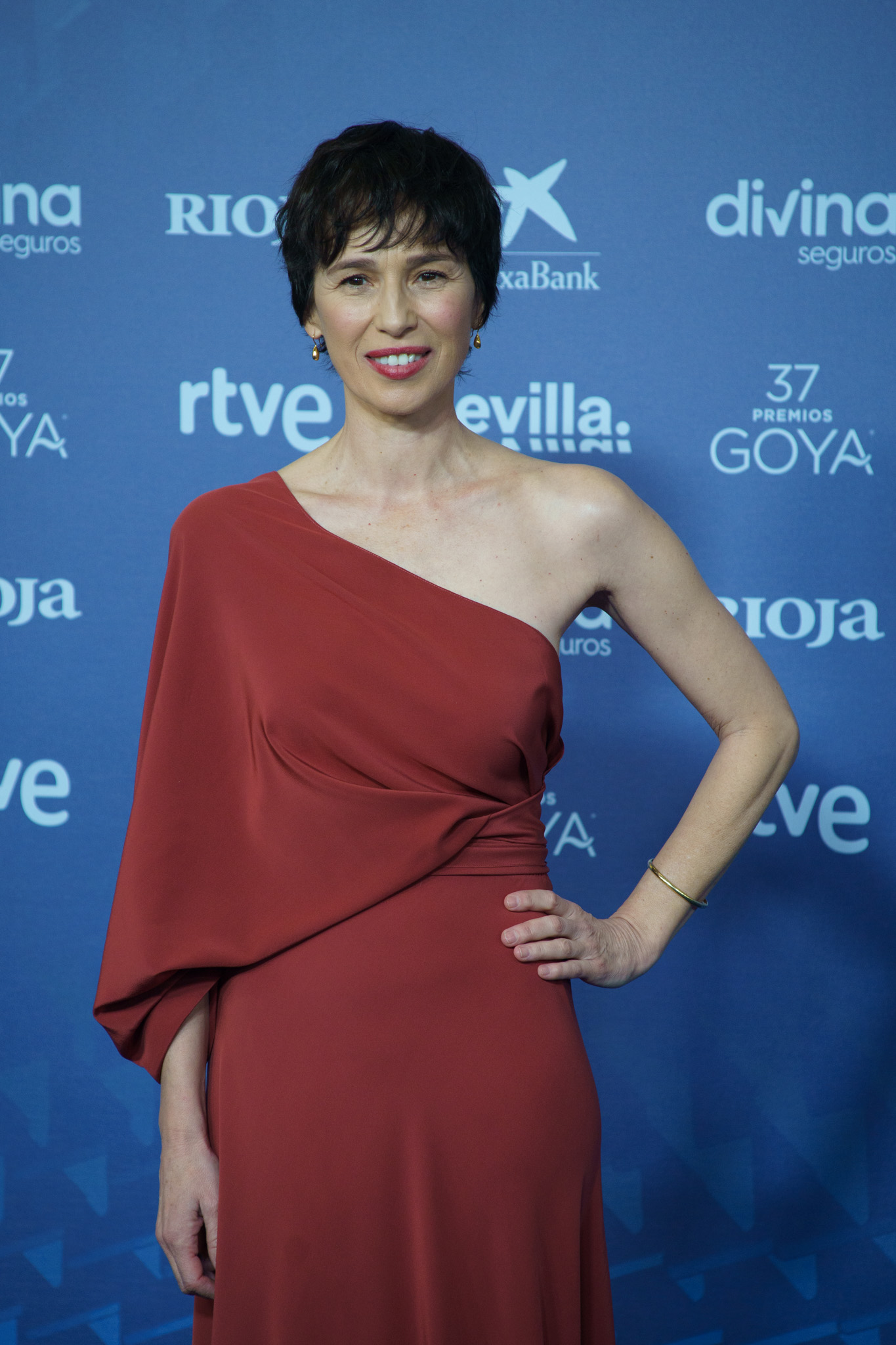
- Gil in 2023
- Born: Ariadna Gil i Giner; 23 January 1969 (age 57); Barcelona, Spain
- Occupation: Actress
- Years active: 1986–present
- Spouse: David Trueba (m. 1993; div. 2008)
- Partner(s): Viggo Mortensen (2009–present)
- Children: 2

Ariadna Gil i Giner (Catalan pronunciation: [əɾiˈanːə ˈʒil i ʒiˈneɾ], born 23 January 1969) is a Spanish actress. She is known for her performances in films such as Belle Époque (for which she won the Goya Award for Best Actress), Black Tears, and Pan's Labyrinth.

== Career ==
Gil made her feature-film debut as an actress in Bigas Luna's Lola (1986). After four films primarily in Catalan, though partly in Spanish and French, she took part in a movie exclusively in Spanish shot in 1991, Emilio Martínez Lázaro's Amo tu cama rica, and has gone on to star in myriad films and series in Catalan, Spanish, French, and English, among other languages.

Between 1993 and 2007, she performed in more than 30 films, including Libertarias, directed by Vicente Aranda; Pan's Labyrinth, directed by Guillermo del Toro; and Soldados de Salamina, directed by her former husband David Trueba.

== Personal life ==
Gil was married to screenwriter, director, and novelist David Trueba, with whom she has two children.

Gil has been in a relationship with Danish-American actor Viggo Mortensen since 2009.

== Filmography ==
=== Film ===
Year	Title	Role	Notes	Ref.
1986	Lola	Ana adolescente	Feature film debut	
1988	El complot dels anells	Muriel		
1990	Capitán Escalaborns	Marina		
1991	Un submarí a les estovalles	Icaria		
1991	Barcelona, lamento	Miranda		
1992	Amo tu cama rica	Sara		
1992	Mal de amores	Angela		
1992	Belle Époque	Violeta		
1994	Todo es mentira (Life's a Bitch)	La Sucia		
1994	Mécaniques célestes (Celestial Clockwork)	Ana		
1994	Los peores años de nuestra vida (The Worst Years of Our Lives)	María		
1995	Atolladero	India		
1995	Antártida (Antarctica)	María		
1996	Tranvía a la Malvarrosa (Tramway to Malvarrosa)	La China		
1996	Malena es un nombre de tango (Malena Is a Name from a Tango)	Malena		
1996	Libertarias	María		
1998	Lágrimas negras (Black Tears)	Isabel		
1998	Talk of Angels	Beatriz		
1998	Don Juan			
1999	Segunda piel (Second Skin)	Elena		
2000	Camera Obscura			
2000	Obra maestra (Masterpiece)	Amanda Castro		
2000	Nueces para el amor (Nuts for Love)	Alicia		
2000	Jet Set	Andréa Dionakis		
2001	Torrente 2: Misión en Marbella			
2001	El lado oscuro del corazón 2 (The Dark Side of the Heart 2)	Alejandra		
2002	La virgen de la lujuria (The Virgin of Lust)	Lola		
2002	El embrujo de Shanghai (The Shanghai Spell)	Anita		
2002	El beso del oso			
2003	Soldados de Salamina (Soldiers of Salamina)	Lola Cercas		
2003	Les Parents terribles			
2005	Hormigas en la boca (Ants in the Mouth)	Julia		
2005	Ausentes (The Absent)	Julia		
2006	Alatriste	María de Castro		
2006	El laberinto del fauno (Pan's Labyrinth)	Carmen		
2006	Bienvenido a casa (Welcome Home)	Sandra		
2007	Quiéreme	Consuelo		
2007	Una estrella y dos cafés			
2008	Appaloosa	Katie		
2008	Sólo quiero caminar (Just Walking)	Aurora		
2009	El baile de la Victoria (The Dancer and the Thief)	Teresa Capriatti		
2011	Værelse 304 (Room 304)	Teresa		
2013	Treading Water	Sophie		
2013	Sola contigo	María Teresa		
2013	Vivir es fácil con los ojos cerrados (Living Is Easy with Eyes Closed)	Madre de Juanjo		
2014	L'altra frontera	Hannah		
2014	Murieron por encima de sus posibilidades (Dying Beyond Their Means)	Directora del colegio ('school's principal')		
2017	Zona hostil (Rescue Under Fire)	Capitán Varela		
2019	Parking	Mercedes		
2021	Solo una vez (Just Once)	Laura		
2022	La casa entre los cactus (The House among the Cactuses)	Rosa		
2023	Calladita (The Quiet Maid)	Andrea		
2026	Sants (Saints)	Gloria		

=== Television ===
Year	Film	Role	Notes	Ref.
2014	Cuéntame cómo pasó	Paz Ortega		
2018–20	Aquí en la Tierra (Here on Earth)	Helena Ogarrio		

== Accolades ==
Year	Award	Category	Work	Result	Ref.
1992	Ondas Awards	Best Film Performance	Amo tu cama rica	Won	
1993	7th Goya Awards	Best Actress	Belle Époque	Won	
1993	37th Sant Jordi Awards	Best Spanish Actress	Amo tu cama rica	Won	
1996	10th Goya Awards	Best Actress	Antarctica	Nominated	
1996	2nd Butaca Awards	Best Film Actress	Malena Is a Name from a Tango	Won	
1998	43rd Valladolid International Film Festival	Best Actress	Black Tears	Won	
2000	14th Goya Awards	Best Actress	Black Tears	Nominated	
2000	Havana Film Festival	Best Actress	Nuts for Love	Won	
2001	49th Silver Condor Awards	Best Actress	Nuts for Love	Won	
2002	50th Silver Condor Awards	Best Actress	The Dark Side of the Heart 2	Nominated	
2004	18th Goya Awards	Best Actress	Soldiers of Salamina	Nominated	
2004	36th ACE Awards	Best Actress	Soldiers of Salamina	Won	
2007	21st Goya Awards	Best Supporting Actress	Alatriste	Nominated	
2007	27th Fantasporto Film Festival	Best Actress	The Absent	Won	
2009	23rd Goya Awards	Best Actress	Just Walking	Nominated	
2009	51st Ariel Awards	Best Actress	Just Walking	Nominated	
