= Francesc Bellmunt =

Spanish film director

Francesc Bellmunt (Catalan pronunciation: [fɾənˈsɛzɡ ˌbeʎˈmun]; born 1 February 1947 in Sabadell) is a Spanish screenwriter and film director from Catalonia.

== Film director ==
- 1975, Canet Rock
- 1975, La Nova Cançó
- 1977, La Torna
- 1978, L'Orgia
- 1979, Salut i força al canut
- 1980, La quinta del porro
- 1983, Pa d'àngel
- 1984, Un parell d'ous
- 1985, La ràdio folla (Radio speed)
- 1988, El complot dels anells
- 1988, Un negre amb un saxo
- 1990, Rateta, rateta
- 1993, Monturiol, el senyor del mar
- 1995, Escenes d'una orgia a Formentera
- 1996, Gràcies per la propina
- 2002, Lisístrata

== Film producer ==
- 1988, El complot dels anells
- 1988, Un negre amb un saxo
- 1990, Rateta, rateta
- 1993, Monturiol, el senyor del mar
- 1995, Escenes d'una orgia a Formentera
- 1996, Gràcies per la propina
- 2000, Lisístrata (Lysistrata)

== TV producer ==
- 1994, Quin curs, el meu tercer (TV movie) TVC
- 1996, Junts (TV movie) TVC
- 1999, Happy House (tv) (serie) TVE
- 2001, Nines russes (TV movie) TVC
- 2006, Àngels i Sants (serie) TVC
