= Eliseo Subiela =

Argentine film director and writer

- Born: Eliseo Alberto Subiela; December 27, 1944; Buenos Aires, Argentina
- Died: December 25, 2016 (aged 71); San Isidro, Buenos Aires, Argentina
- Occupation(s): Film director, screenwriter

Eliseo Alberto Subiela (December 27, 1944 – December 25, 2016) was an Argentine film director and writer. His works are considered to be in the 'magic realism' genre.

Subiela was the father of actress, Guadalupe Subiela (who acted in her father's film, Pequeños Milagros). He has won and been nominated for awards at the Toronto, Montreal, Berlin, Istanbul and Havana film festivals, among others.

== Writer/Director ==
- The Long Silence / Un largo silencio (1963)
- Sobre todas estas estrellas (1965)
- Argentina, mayo de 1969: Los caminos de la liberación (1969)
- The Conquest of Paradise / La conquista del paraíso (1981)
- Man Facing Southeast / Hombre mirando al sudeste (1986)
- Last Images of the Shipwreck / Últimas imágenes del naufragio (1989)
- The Dark Side of the Heart / El lado oscuro del corazón (1992)
- Don't Die Without Telling Me Where You're Going / No te mueras sin decirme adónde vas (1995)
- Wake Up Love / Despabílate amor (1996)
- Little Miracles / Pequeños milagros (1997)
- The Adventures of God / Las aventuras de Dios (2000)
- The Dark Side of the Heart 2 / El lado oscuro del corazón 2 (2001)
- Angel (2002) (TV)
- El Destino de Angélica (2002) (TV)
- Relaciones carnales (2002) (TV)
- Heartlift / Lifting de corazón (2005)
- Larga distancia (2005) (TV miniseries)
- The Effect of Love / El resultado del amor (2007)
- Don't Look Down / No mires para abajo (2008)
- Vanishing Landscapes / Paisajes devorados (2012)
- Hostage of an Illusion / Rehén de ilusiones (2012)
