= Pilar Boyero =

Spanish singer

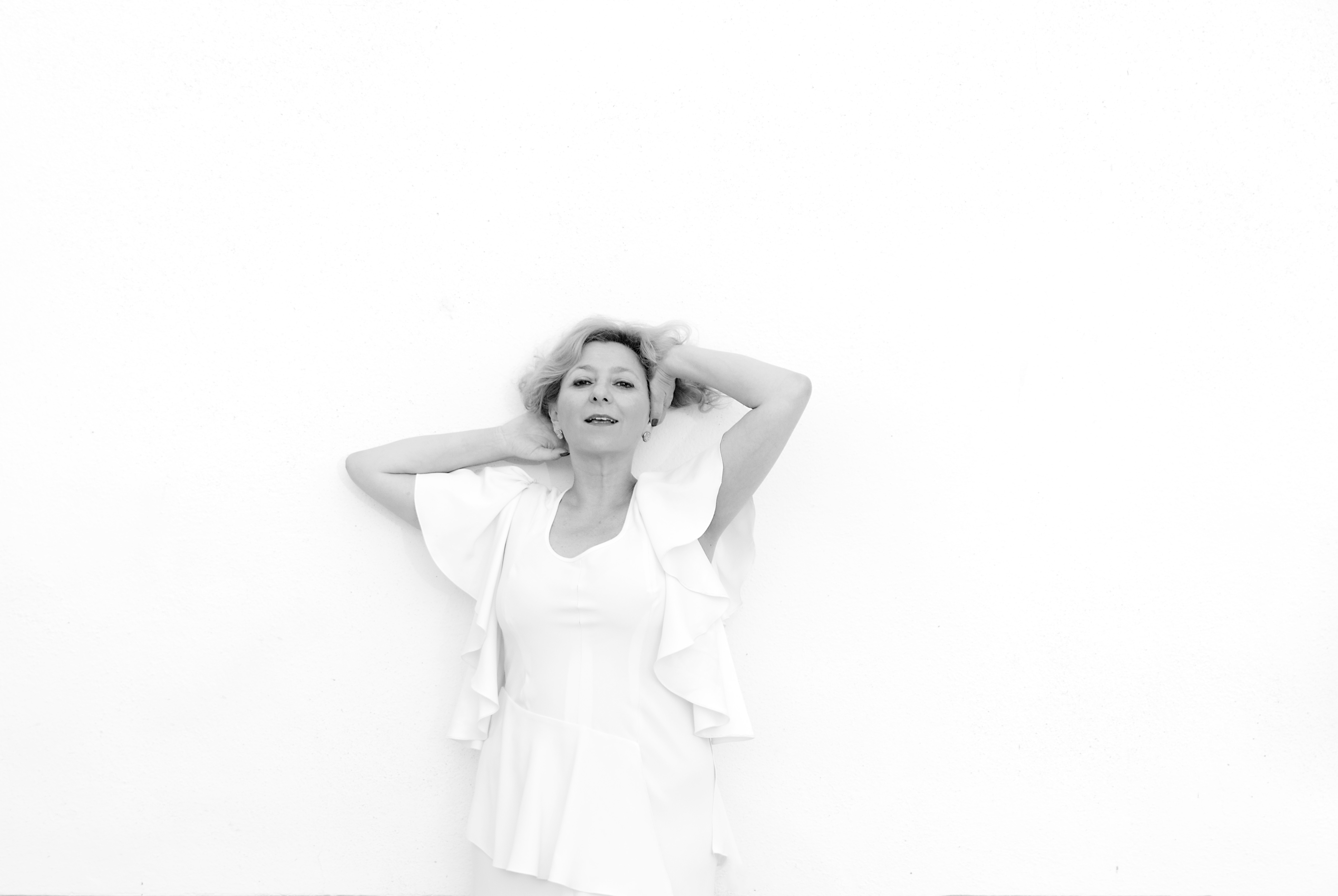
- Born: Pilar Boyero Gómez; May 28, 1974 (age 51); Cáceres, Spain
- Occupations: Singer; artist; radio presenter; professor
- Years active: 1992–present
- Awards: Cubadisco Award: Best internacional album
- Musical career
- Also known as: La Catedrática de la Copla ("The Professor of Copla")
- Genres: Copla; Flamenco; Latin ballad
- Instrument: Vocals

Pilar Boyero Gómez (born May 28, 1974), better known as Pilar Boyero, is a Spanish singer, radio presenter and professor specializing in copla. She was born in Cáceres and nicknamed "La Catedrática de la Copla" ("The Professor of Copla").

== Biography ==
She studied law at the University of Extremadura. She was a singing and piano student at the "Hermanos Berzosa" Official Conservatory of Music in Cáceres for five years and soloist with the university choir. In Seville she studied with Maestro Borriño, specializing in copla, and later in Madrid with Maestro Bazán.

She decided to dedicate herself professionally to copla in 1992, after having stood out in this genre performing on local stations, neighborhood parties, festivals, etc. That same year, she participated in the tribute to the composer Juan Solano which was held in Cáceres, with established artists such as Lolita Sevilla, Paquita Rico, María José Santiago, etc., organized by the Cáceres Provincial Council. She was also included in the activity programs of the Junta de Extremadura and the Provincial Councils of Cáceres and Badajoz, such as "Estivalia", "Otoño Musical", among others.

In 1995 she released her first album entitled "El cante mío" on the national market; Recorded at the Jammin 'studios in Mérida. This record work was played on the main radio stations dedicated to Spanish music: Cadena Dial, Radio Nacional de España, etc.

She frequently performed outside the region, performing in Extremaduran clubs such as Igualada (Barcelona), Vitoria, etc., as well as in theaters and venues in Madrid. In May of that year she performed in the capital on Canal 47 television as a guest artist in the program "Las noches del 47", presented by Maestro Bazán. She was included in the Spanish flamenco show "Quejío", devised by flamenco guitarist José Antonio Conde.

In February 1996 she was accompanied on the piano by the pianist Felipe Campuzano, in a performance held at the San Francisco Auditorium of Cáceres. In April of this same year, he toured Morocco, performing in educational centers dependent on the Spanish Embassy. In 1998 he began his summer tour performing in an acoustic concert (piano, double bass and voice) at the legendary Ateneo Cultural Center in Madrid. The same concluding it three months later, in the Congress and Exhibition Palace of Salamanca, performing accompanied by her orchestra.

On April 28, 1999, she presented her second album "Pilar Boyero canta al Maestro Solano", with a concert at the Cáceres Auditorium. (Palace of Congresses of Cáceres.)

Since the beginning of 2002, she has been giving conferences under two headings: "La copla, recuperación de un patrimonio común" y "La copla y las leyes: El derecho de la pasión"; also published in cultural magazines.

In September she participated in the musical show "Extremadura, los sonidos de un pueblo", a production of the Junta de Extremadura for the acts of the Day of Extremadura in the Roman Theater of Mérida.

In addition, that same year she premiered her show "Una vida Entera", a musical project with international artists such as the American trumpeter Jerry González, the Cadiz pianist Chano Domínguez, both protagonists of the film Calle 54 by Fernando Trueba, the jazz-flamenco saxophonist-flautist Jorge Pardo and the violinist Ara Malikian, who took the stage for the first time with Pilar Boyero in a concert held in Guadalupe in August 2002.

On June 4, 2004, she presented her album "Una vida entera", accompanied by Chano Domínguez and Jerry González, at the Gran Teatro de Cáceres and continuing like this, by various theaters in Extremadura. This album is full of art, sensations, emotions, flavors, sighs, but above all, a compliment of the soul and the freedom to dream and love. She renews the copla with nuances of salsa and jazz, opening the way to continue advancing in the world of fusion, thus being a turning point in her career.

Since 2006 she writes, presents and directs the program "Soy lo prohibido" on Canal Extremadura Radio, which is dedicated to copla. In addition, she performed the section "La copla por montera" in the program "El Coso" of the same station.

In May 2008 she was honored by more than 40 artists in the "Divina Pilar" exhibition at the Gran Teatro de Cáceres. The exhibition collected a photographic and pictorial treatment of the figure of Pilar Boyero as queen of the copla. In addition, paintings, videos, sculptures and even graffiti were shown; in total more than fifty pieces. At first the show was only going to occupy one floor of the theater, but due to the success of the call, the works were divided into two floors.

In 2009 she was the herald of the Medieval Carnival of Cáceres, at the Palace of the Golfines de Arriba.

That same year she participated in the short film "¡Cuánta mentira!", directed by Marce Solís.

In 2010 she published the album "Cáceres-Manhattan", with lyrics from the homonymous collection of poems by Santiago Tobar and with arrangements by the composer Carlos Ojeda. The concept of the album is about human relationships, how they are established and fluctuate, how some endure and others fade. He opted for the fusion of poetry, copla and other music. The songs surprised by the mix of sounds and their originality. In some cases, due to the quality of the compositions and in others due to the musical risk assumed by this project, far from being commercial.

Since 2011 she teaches 'Historia de la copla' at the University of Extremadura.

In April 2011 she published the EP "Coplas de puñalá", recorded at Casa Limón and Jenny Music, thanks to artists such as Antonio Serrano, Jerry González, Jorge Pardo or Niño Josele. In addition, it has collaborations such as that of Juan Antonio Valderrama. This work revises the classic copla with a very current vision and reflects an important part of the artist's life. The name was due to a phrase by Carlos Cano in an interview with Arturo Pérez Reverte, in which he advocated the copla of the singing café, of the great-grandfather and of the dagger.

Months later she recorded the song "Embrujá por tu querer", with the collaboration of Jerry González, filling this song with New York magic with flamenco overtones, resulting in a complete fusion.

In 2012 she presented the space "Cuadernos de copla" in the program "Nuestra tarde" on Canal Extremadura.

In November 2012, she released the album "Por siempre Carlos Cano", a tribute record to Granada-born singer-songwriter Carlos Cano.

In addition, tour with the show of the same name. One of its peculiarities is that it has the artist's original band, led by Benjamín Torrijo, who accompanied him for 15 years, and is the musical director and director of the arrangements in recent years. The repertoire brings together his most emblematic hits such as "Habaneras de Cádiz", "Alacena de las monjas", "El tango de las madres locas", "Dormido entre rosas" and those titles that he recovered such as "Ojos verdes", "La bien pagá", "Tani", "Antonio Vargas Heredia", "Rocío", reaching its most exciting moment with María la portuguesa, a song which they sing to duet.

In March 2015 she was awarded the "A Tu Vera Award" by Castilla-La Mancha Media.

In April of that same year she received the Grada Award for Leisure at the Palace of Congresses of Badajoz. And in November she was awarded the Menina Award, in recognition of her commitment to the eradication of gender violence.

In 2016 she performed with the Orchestra of Extremadura, conducted by Álvaro Albiach, at the Roman Theater of Mérida, during the Extremadura Day gala. It was broadcast on the international channel Canal Extremadura, which opened the Latin American market for it. That same year, she finished a tribute album to Juan Solano Pedrero, which is titled "Solano sinfónico", recorded with the Orquesta de Extremadura and with the collaboration of Carmen París, Clara Montes and Enrique Heredia Negri.

In 2017 she was awarded the "Cáceres con nombre de mujer Award", in recognition of her defense of women.

In 2019 she received the "Las Vaguadas Award", for her commitment to education and children's rights.

In March 2020, she presented the album "Cuba por coplas", recorded live in Havana on October 20, Cuban Culture Day, with the National Symphony Orchestra of Cuba, conducted by Enrique Pérez Mesa. In it, the soprano Milagros de los Ángeles made a collaboration. All the songs on the album are by the composer Juan Solano Pedrero from Cáceres. This album was nominated for the Best International Album Cubadisco 2020-2021.

In July 2021, she published her latest album entitled "Notas de viajes", a tribute to Carlos Cano, in which his son Pablo Cano and Israel Rojas, singer of the group Buena Fe, collaborate.

On November 15, 2021, she paid tribute to Rocío Jurado, La Más Grande, with the show "Algo se nos fue contigo", at the EDP Gran Via Theatre in Madrid. It is inspired by the legendary artist, not only the repertoire, but also the staging and costumes. The orchestra was made up of fifteen musicians, directed by Juan Carlos Carrasco, who usually works with artists such as Ricky Martin. The drummer, Juan Carlos Rico, who also played with Jurado herself. And also, a flamenco group, among which is the dancer Andrés Malpica. Among the personalities who attended the event were Enrique Heredia Negri, Olga María Ramos, Javier de Montini, Hilario López Millán, Manuel Francisco Reina, Carlos Vargas, Roser, Mara Barros and Jesús Manuel Ruiz.

Days later she performed with Omara Portuondo and Enrique Heredia Negri in the show "Canciones de ida y vuelta" in Talayuela.

In April 2022 she was a member of the jury of the San Remo Music Awards Cuba. In addition, she performed concerts and conferences in Cuba, performing with artists such as Waldo Mendoza or Israel Rojas, who is the singer of the group Buena Fe.

Later she was nominated for the Cubadisco Awards in the Best International Album category. She was part of the program of the WOMAD festival in Cáceres 2022, performing at the Carvajal Palace in Cáceres, dedicated to the history of copla from the perspective of women.

In May, finally, she was awarded the Cubadisco 2022 Award for Best International Album. The award ceremony was at the Teatro América in Havana, where the artist performed.

In July, she performed several concerts with the Cuban artist Haila Mompié at the 16th Anniversary of Partagás' Friends Meeting in Matelica (Italy), where she received the Partagás' Friends Club Award.

In August she performed at the Salorino Copla Festival. The artists Soraia Branco, Nane Ramos, Guadiana Almena and Lucía Panadero Lechuga also performed.

== Nursing homes ==
Since 2006 she has been working with Alzheimer's patients singing copla, thanks to the good results that this genre brings about in them. Also since 2016, she has offered concert cycles, accompanied on the piano by Pedro Monty, in nursing homes in Extremadura, with two programs financed by the Diputación de Cáceres, Diputación de Badajoz, foundations and town councils: “Vivir la copla” and “Te recuerdo”.

== Discography ==
- 1995: El cante mío.
- 1998: Pilar Boyero canta al maestro Solano.
- 2004: Una vida entera.
- 2011: Coplas de puñalá.
- 2016: Por siempre Carlos Cano.
- 2020: Cuba por coplas.
- 2021: Notas de viajes.
- 2025: Solano a la orilla de mi boca.

== Awards and honours ==
- 2005: Premio Superolé 2005.
- 2015: Premio Grada al ocio.
- 2015: Premio A Tu Vera.
- 2015: Premio Menina 2015.
- 2017: Premio Cáceres con nombre de mujer.
- 2017: Premio Las Vaguadas.
- 2017: Premio Ellas 2020.
- 2021: Nominación Cubadisco 2020-2021: Mejor Disco Internacional.
- 2021: Embajadora del Capazo.
- 2022: Nominación VI Premios Extremadura Exporta: Empresa de servicios.
- 2022: Premio Cubadisco 2022: Mejor Disco Internacional.
- 2022: Premio Club Amigos de Partagás.
