= Welcome Home (2006 film) =

- Theatrical release poster
- Spanish: Bienvenido a casa
- Directed by: David Trueba
- Written by: David Trueba
- Produced by: Cristina Huete; Teddy Villalba
- Starring: Pilar López de Ayala; Alejo Sauras; Ariadna Gil; Juan Echanove; Jorge Sanz; Javivi Gil Valle; Julián Villagrán; Juana Acosta; Vicente Haro; Carlos Larrañaga; Concha Velasco
- Cinematography: Juan Molina
- Edited by: Manuel Huete
- Music by: Andrés Calamaro; Javier Limón
- Production companies: Fernando Trueba PC; Ensueño Films
- Release dates: 17 March 2006 (Málaga); 7 April 2006 (Spain)
- Running time: 121 minutes
- Country: Spain
- Language: Spanish

Welcome Home (Spanish: Bienvenido a Casa) is a 2006 Spanish romantic comedy-drama film written and directed by David Trueba, starring Pilar López de Ayala and Alejo Sauras as Eva and Samuel, a couple just settled in Madrid, alongside Ariadna Gil, Juan Echanove, Jorge Sanz, Javivi Gil Valle, Julián Villagrán, Juana Acosta, Vicente Haro, Carlos Larrañaga and Concha Velasco.

== Cast ==
- Pilar López de Ayala as Eva
- Alejo Sauras as Samuel
- Ariadna Gil as Sandra
- Juan Echanove as Félix
- Julián Villagrán as Contra
- Jorge Sanz as Lucas
- Javivi Gil Valle as Mariano
- Concha Velasco as madre de Samuel
- Juana Acosta as Nieves
- Carlos Larrañaga as Andrés
- Vicente Haro as Don Vicente

== Production ==
The film is a Fernando Trueba PC and Ensueño Films production, and it had the participation of Antena 3 and Canal+. Javier Limón and Andrés Calamaro were responsible for composing and producing the score. It was shot in between Madrid, Almería and Santander.

== Release ==
The film screened out as the opening film of the 9th Málaga Film Festival in March 2006. It was theatrically released in Spain on 7 April 2006.

== Accolades ==
Year	Award	Category	Nominee(s)	Result	Ref.
2006	9th Málaga Film Festival	Silver Biznaga for Best Director	David Trueba	Won	
2007	21st Goya Awards	Best Original Song	"Duermen los niños" by Andrés Calamaro, Javier Limón, David Trueba	Nominated	

== See also ==
- List of Spanish films of 2006
