= Copla (music) =

Andalusian musical genre

The copla, copla andaluza ("Andalusian copla"), canción andaluza, canción española, tonadilla or canción folklórica is a form of Spanish popular song, deriving from the poetic form of the same name. Although the genre has a long heritage, it flourished in the 1930s and 1940s, and is epitomized by songwriters Antonio Quintero, Rafael de León and Manuel Quiroga.

One of the first singers of coplas was Raquel Meller. Initially she sang cuplé, which later evolved in Andalusian and Spanish song into the copla as it is known today. Other well-known singers of coplas are Imperio Argentina, Manolo Corrales, Estrellita Castro, Concha Piquer, Miguel de Molina, Lola Flores, Marifé de Triana, Juanita Reina, Manolo Escobar, Juanito Valderrama, Sara Montiel and Antonio Molina.

Particularly of note is Carlos Cano, who was a key figure in reviving the popularity of the copla in the later 20th century. More recent singers of coplas include Rocío Jurado, Bambino, María Jiménez, Isabel Pantoja, Martirio, and Miguel Poveda and, even more recently, Pasión Vega, Clara Montes, Pastora Soler, Aurora Guirado, Diana Navarro, Pilar Boyero, Concha Buika, Montse Delgado and opera singer Plácido Domingo, who released an album of coplas entitled Pasión Española in 2008. Some of these artists, particularly Pasión Vega (born 1976) and Diana Navarro (born 1978), have bent and stretched the genre in directions that have come to be known as Nueva Copla ("New Copla").

Some examples of famous coplas include "Ojos verdes" (Green Eyes), "Tatuaje" (Tattoo), "La falsa moneda" (The Fake Coin), "María de la O," and "Rocío." The lyrics often feature marginalized characters, including prostitutes, sailors, escaped convicts, gypsies and so on, and have themes based on the "illegitimacy of all relationships outside the recognized heterosexual marriage" (i.e., mistreated women, abandoned children and extramarital affairs). Because these were stories of love gone wrong, of women who crossed the line of sexual mores, and of men's honor, they used to be criticized for being old-fashioned and sexist. However, more recently, modern performers have given the songs a new twist by "selecting coplas that vindicate a women's power, their independence and their passion." Lidia García's podcast on coplas, ¡Ay, campaneras! analyzes the humor and double meaning of the songs.

== See also ==
- Cuplé – a genre of risqué cabaret songs in Spain of the 1890s–1910s
