= Chano Domínguez =

Spanish Latin jazz pianist (born 1960)

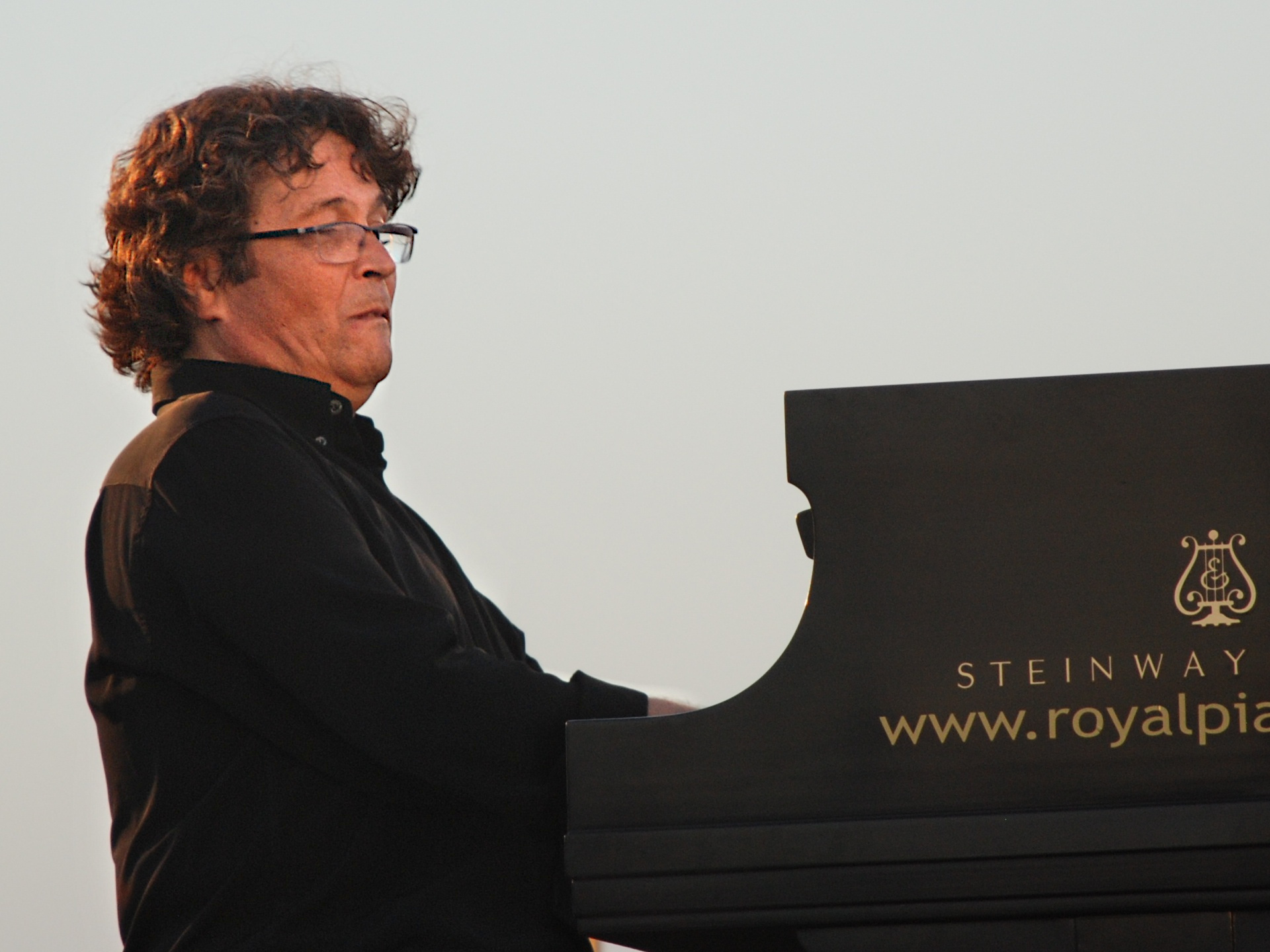
Chano Domínguez in 2007.

Chano Domínguez (born Sebastián Domínguez Lozano; 29 March 1960, in Cádiz, Spain) is a Spanish Latin jazz, post bop and flamenco pianist. Dominguez has released over 20 albums as a bandleader, and collaborated extensively with other jazz artists including Paquito D’Rivera, Gonzalo Rubalcaba, Joe Lovano, Chucho Valdés, Martirio, and Wynton Marsalis and the Lincoln Center Jazz Orchestra, He performs his own original compositions, as well as the music of Harold Arlen, Thelonious Monk, Miles Davis, and the Spanish classical composer Joaquín Rodrigo. He was nominated for a Grammy Award in 2012 for his album Flamenco Sketches on the Blue Note label.

Domínguez began his career in the progressive rock group CAI before moving on to jazz. They recorded three LPs from 1978 to 1980, Mas Alla de Nuestras Mentes Diminutas, Noche Abierta and Cancion de Primavera for the Columbia label. After CAI broke up in the early 1980s, Dominguez joined the local, Cadiz-based jazz ensemble, Hixcadix.

Domínguez's initial interest in jazz came from jazz fusion groups like Mahavishnu Orchestra or Weather Report, but later he became interested in Bill Evans and Thelonious Monk. In 1992, he formed his first jazz trio, and won First Prize in the National Jazz Competition for Young Performers that same year, and released his first recording as a leader, Chano, in 1993, followed by Diez de Paco in 1994. From there, Dominguez recorded a number of projects, including Coplas de Madruga, with the Spanish flamenco singer Martirio.

Domínguez's greatest international exposure came in the year 2000, courtesy of his performance of his composition, “Oye Como Viene,” in Spanish director Fernando Trueba’s Grammy Award-winning Latin jazz documentary Calle 54, which also featured Eliane Elias, Jerry Gonzalez and the Fort Apache Band and Tito Puente. Dominguez has also been nominated for three Latin Grammys, including two in the "Best Flamenco Album" category: a 2002 collaboration with singer Martirio called Mucho Corazon, and a 2015 collaboration with singer Blas Cordoba, AKA “El Kejío”, called Bendito.

Domínguez performs as both a solo artist and in collaboration with a number of different artists and combos. Domínguez performs regularly in a trio with bassist Horacio Fumero and drummer David Xirgu, another trio with bassist Alexis Cuadrado and drummer Henry Cole; as well as various duets with longtime collaborator bassist Javier Colina, a flutist Hadar Noiberg, and pianist Steffano Bolani.

Domínguez’s Flamenco Quartet performs the classic compositions of Manuel de Falla, Isaac Albeniz, Enrique Granados, and Federico Mompou, with percussionist Pablo Dominguez and singer Blas Cordoba and dancer Daniel Navarro. In 2018, Dominguez debuted his quintet consisting of himself, Cuadrado, Cole, Cordoba and Navarro.

In addition to his recording and performing career, Domínguez has taught at Juilliard, the Taller de Músics in Barcelona, the Bogotá Conservatory, and the University of Washington School of Music, among other institutions. Domínguez currently resides in Brooklyn, NY and records for the Queens, NY-based Sunnyside label.

== Discography ==
- Chano Nuba Records 1993
- 10 de Paco versions of Paco de Lucía's songs, with Jorge Pardo and Tino di Geraldo, 1994.
- Hecho a mano (with Tomatito), 1995
- Coplas de Madrugá (With Martirio) 1996
- En directo Café Central 1998
- Tú no sospechas, (With Marta Valdés) 2000
- Imán (with Enrique Morente, Sunnyside Records), 1999
- Mira como viene, 2003
- Oye como viene, 2003
- 1993-2003, 2004
- Con alma (with George Mraz and Jeff Ballard), 2005
- Cuentos del mundo, 2005
- Flamenco Jazz, 2005
- Acoplados (with Martirio, Sunnyside Records), 2004
- New Flamenco Sound, 2006.
- Acércate más, 2004
- Cuentos del Mundo (Sunnyside Records) 2008
- Quartier Latin (with Paquito D'Rivera), 2009
- Piano Ibérico (Blue Note)2010
- Flamenco sketches (Blue Note) 2011
- Chano &Josele (Calle54 Records) 2012
- Hecho a Mano (with Enrique Morente, Sunnyside Records) 2015
- Over The Rainbow (Sunnyside Records) 2017
- Chano & Colina (with Javier Colina, Sunnyside Records) 2018
- Quatro (with Magos Herrera) John Finbury (composer) 2020

== Awards ==
In 2020 he was awarded the Premio Nacional de las Músicas Actuales (Spanish National Award on Recent Music styles).
