= Lucía Jiménez =

Spanish actress

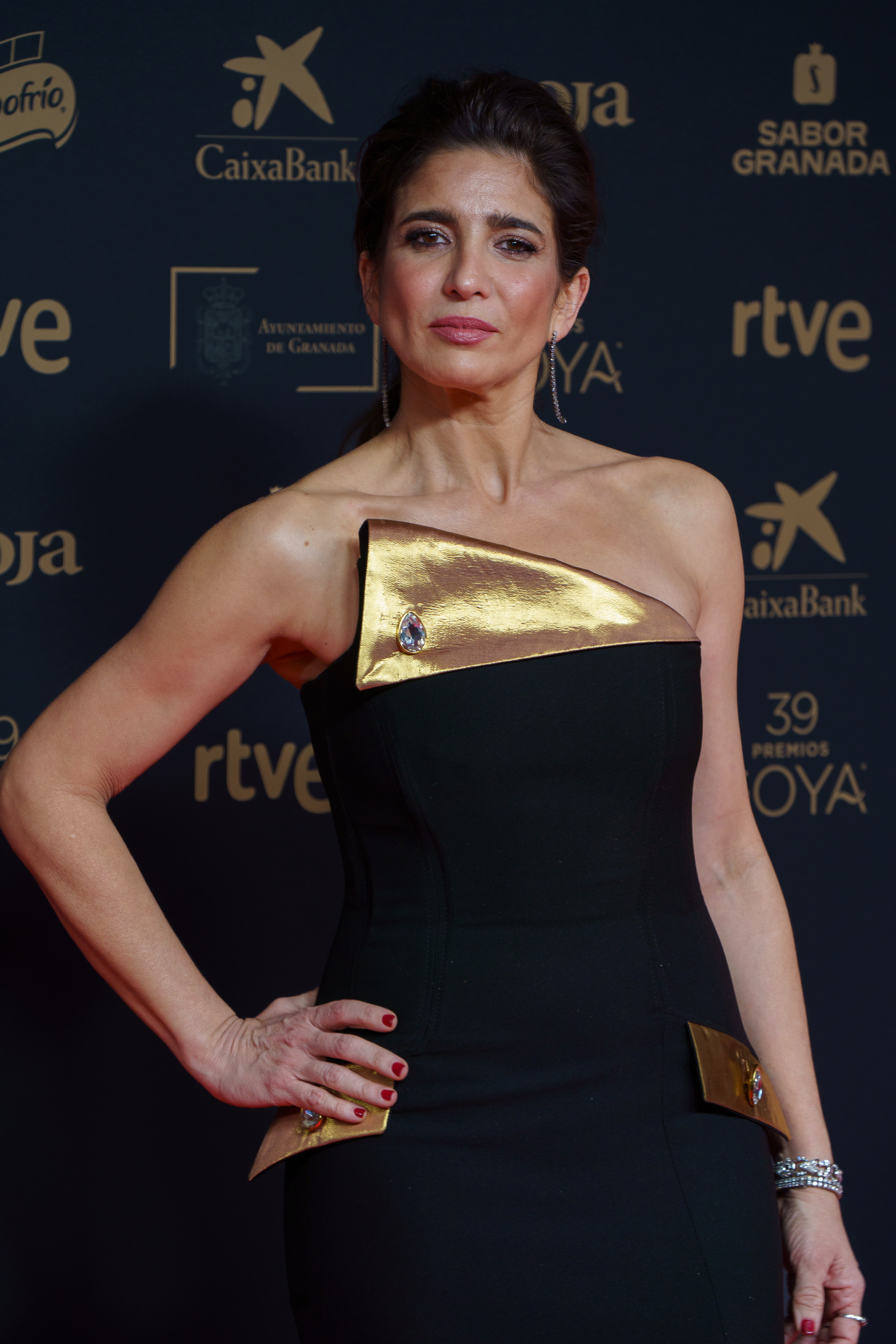
- Jiménez in 2025
- Born: Lucía Jiménez Arranz; 21 November 1978 (age 47); Segovia, Spain
- Years active: 1996 - present

Lucía Jiménez Arranz (born 21 November 1978) is a Spanish actress.

She started with a David Trueba movie, The Good Life, and she became very popular thanks to the TV series Al salir de clase.

== Filmography ==
=== Cinema ===
Year	Film	Role	Notes	Ref.
1996	La buena vida (The Good Life)	Lucía		
1998	No se lo digas a nadie	Alejandra		
1998	Una pareja perfecta (A Perfect Couple)	Sonia		
1998	El olor del vientre	Mensajera		
2000	Tinta roja (Red Ink)	Nadia		
2000	Kasbah	Lua		
2000	El arte de morir (The Art of Dying)	Patricia		
2000	Mi abuelo es un animal			
2001	Silencio roto (Broken Silence)	Lucía		
2001	La caída del imperio			
2001	Estés donde estés	adult Angela		
2002	El refugio del mal	Eloisa		
2002	Mantis			
2003	Ilegal	Sofía		
2004	Mujeres infieles	Roberta Lage		
2004	Eyes of Crystal	Giuditta		
2004	El atraco	Erika		
2005	Los 2 lados de la cama (The 2 Sides of the Bed)	Raquel		
2005	Pobre juventud	Rebeca		
2006	Los Borgia	María Enríquez		
2006	The Kovak Box	Silvia Mendez		
2007	El club de los suicidas	Ana		
2007	Café solo o con ellas (Love Expresso)	Bea		
2008	Butterflies & Lightning			
2008	Sangre de mayo (Blood in May)	Plata		
2008	Cosas insignificantes	Eli		
2008	Proyecto Dos			
2018	Casi 40 (Almost 40)	Lucía	Reprise of role in The Good Life	
2024	El cuento del lobo	Olga		

=== Television ===
Year	Series	Role	Notes	Ref.
1997–1998	Al salir de clase	Silvia Castro	107 episodes	
2003	Jugar a matar	Inés	TV movie	
2004	El cruce	Lourdes/Rocío	TV movie	
2007	Hidden Camera	Alejandra	TV movie	
2008	Cazadores de hombres	Elena Ocana	1 episode	
2008–2010	La Señora	Encarna Alcántara Prieto	39 episodes	
2010	Ben Hur	Athene	Miniseries	
2011, 2018-2019	14 de abril. La República	Encarna Alcántara Prieto		
2015	Las aventuras del Capitán Alatriste	Caridad la lebrijana		
2016	La sonata del silencio	Virtudes Molina		
2017	El gran reto musical	Invitada		
2017-2018	Tu cara me suena	Concursante		
2018	Apaches	Teresa, sister of Miguel		
2019	Hospital Valle Norte	Emma Olivares		
2019	Amar es para siempre	Irene Eguía		
