= Lidia García =

Spanish activist

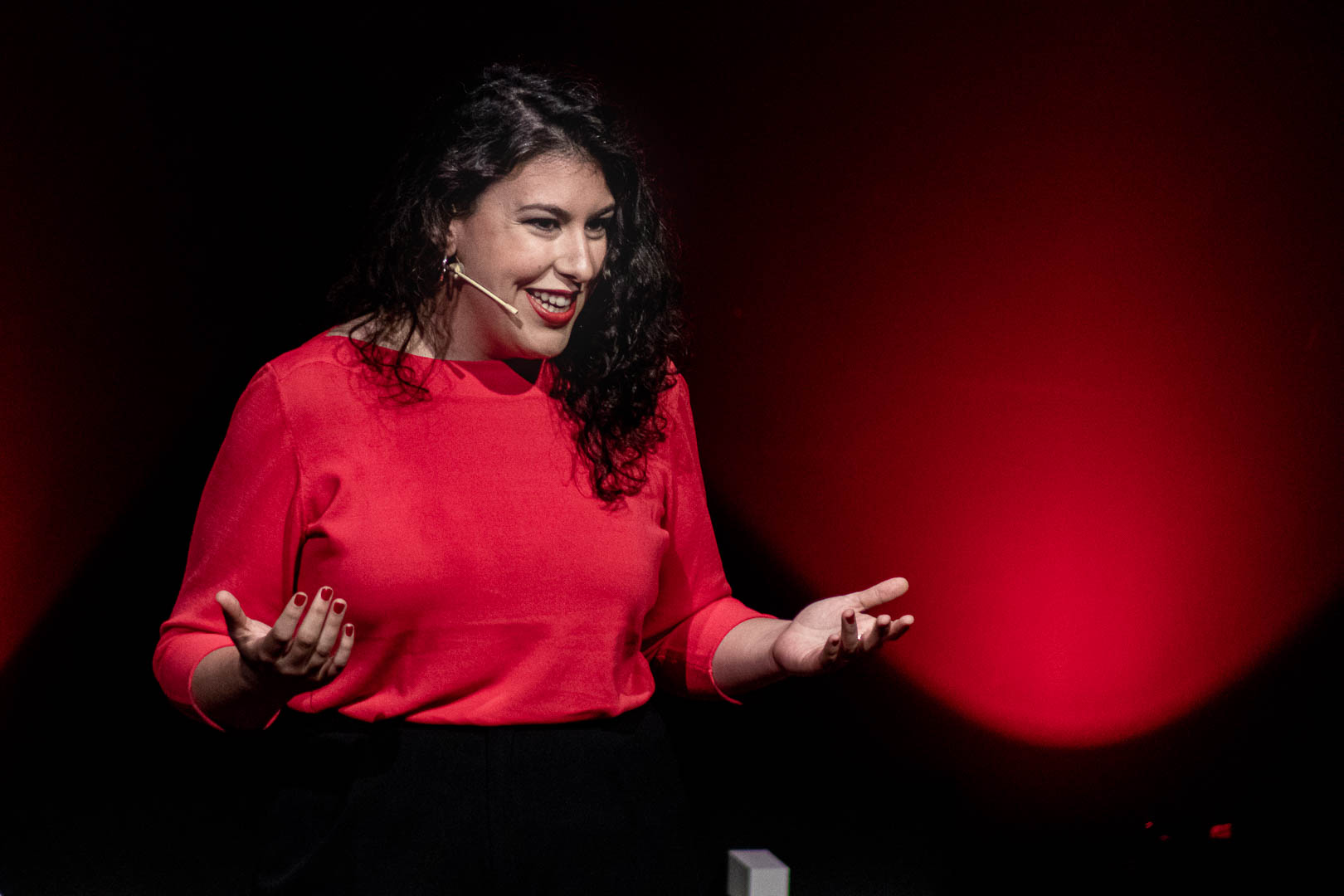
- Born: Lidia García García; 26 November 1989 (age 36); Montealegre del Castillo, Spain
- Other name: The Queer Cañí Bot
- Education: University of Valencia; University of Alicante; University of Murcia

Lidia García García, also known as The Queer Cañí Bot, (Montealegre del Castillo, November 26, 1989), is a Spanish lesbian researcher and activist. She is a popularizer of copla, feminism, and sexual dissidence in social networks and in the podcast ¡Ay, campaneras! that she created during the confinement caused by the COVID-19 pandemic.

== Trajectory ==
She was born on November 26, 1989, in Montealegre del Castillo, a municipality in the province of Albacete. She listened to zarzuelas, and cuplés since she was a child because her mother used to sing them. She started writing in her childhood and has won some literary prizes. One of them allowed her to participate as an expeditionary in the education and cultural exchange project La Ruta Quetzal in 2006 and to travel through Mexico, Belize and Guatemala.

She graduated in Hispanic Philology at the University of Valencia and later in Humanities at the University of Alicante, where she obtained the extraordinary end-of-degree prize and a mention for academic excellence from the Generalitat Valenciana. Her final thesis was awarded the first national prize in the category of Social Sciences and Humanities in the XV Certamen Arquímedes de Introducción a la Investigación Científica of the Ministry of Education. She is a predoctoral researcher in the Department of Art History at the University of Murcia with a thesis on kitsch aesthetics, childhood imagination, and gender in digital visual culture.

Through various international mobility programs, she was able to pursue studies outside her country, in places such as Coímbra, Montevideo, and Berlin. She specialized in artistic heritage research. Her doctoral thesis deals with contemporary art and popular culture from a gender perspective, and she has participated in international congresses such as the University of Cambridge and the University of Southern Denmark on this topic. She has also published articles in scientific journals and in media such as El Salto, El País, Vogue and Vanity Fair. On social networking sites, she is known as The Queer Cañí Bot, an alias under which she began to participate so as not to reveal who she was. Finally, several factors led her to make her identity visible. She is a regular contributor to the program Hoy empieza todo on Radio 3.

In 2020, during the confinement caused by the COVID-19 pandemic, García decided to create a podcast from the bathroom of her home without a professional microphone, which she called ¡Ay, campaneras! The more than 30 episodes that have been produced, in which she talks about sexuality, humor, or the faranduleo of the world of the copla, as well as the double meanings of the lyrics of the songs, have accumulated thousands of reproductions in 23 countries.

In 2021, she participated in the Movistar Plus+ documentary series Lola, about the life of the artist Lola Flores.

Thanks to the success of the podcast, in January 2022, García published her first book, ¡Ay, campaneras! Canciones para seguir adelante, an essay where she delves into the topics she had been dealing with in the episodes made in sound format, explaining the stories behind the copla songs, where there are female transgressions, social class differences are denounced, and the desire for freedom during the repression of Franco's dictatorship. In addition, the book tells different anecdotes, such as that the German philosopher Friedrich Nietzsche said that "the loudest thing" he had ever heard in his life was the zarzuela La Gran Vía (1886) by Federico Chueca and Joaquín Valverde Durán, or that the comedian Charles Chaplin had stolen the music of La violetera for his film Luces de la ciudad (1931).

Garcia's research and various popularization works on the world of the copla appear at the same time as other academic research, such as those of professors Alberto Romero and Cristina Cruces; researchers Inmaculada Mata Polo, Enrique Encabo, and Javier Barreiro; and the comic Doña Concha, la rosa y la espina by illustrator Carla Berrocal on the life of singer Concha Piquer, and are considered a reference in this field.

On May 7, 2022, she participated as a speaker with the talk: ¿Qué podemos aprender de las canciones de nuestras abuelas? At the TED event, TEDxVitoriaGasteiz, held in the city of Vitoria, which on this occasion focused on positive things that arose as a result of the confinement due to the COVID-19 pandemic, and therefore, its motto was "Empowered."

== Recognitions ==
García was awarded in November 2021 with the 'Las horas' award of the Fancinegay in Badajoz, for giving visibility to the LGBTI collective through her work as a disseminator and for having managed to bring Spanish popular song to the new generations from a gender and class perspective.

In 2022, Garca was recognized as the Student of the Year Award, presented by the University of Murcia, for giving voice to culture and considering her a national reference in terms of equality and identity of the LGBT+ collective. That same year, it became the winner of the Las Horas Award given by FanCineGay, the International LGBT Film Festival of Extremadura, for its vindicating role, with a feminist, LGBTI and working class approach, of the copla, cuplé, and zarzuela.

Also in 2022, Andalesgai, the Seville LGBTI Film Festival, awarded Garca the Triángulo Andaluca Award for visibility in its 18th edition.

== Work ==
- 2022 – ¡Ay campaneras! Canciones para seguir adelante. Plan B. ISBN 978-8418051449.
