= Two Much =

- Theatrical release poster
- Directed by: Fernando Trueba
- Screenplay by: Fernando Trueba; David Trueba
- Based on: Two Much by Donald Westlake and Le Jumeau written by Élisabeth Rappeneau
- Produced by: Cristina Huete; Andrés Vicente Gómez
- Starring: Antonio Banderas; Melanie Griffith; Daryl Hannah; Danny Aiello; Joan Cusack; Eli Wallach
- Cinematography: José Luis Alcaine
- Edited by: Nena Bernard
- Music by: Michel Camilo
- Production companies: Touchstone Pictures; Interscope Communications; PolyGram Filmed Entertainment; Fernando Trueba Producciones Cinematográficas S.A.; Sogetel
- Distributed by: Sogepaq (Spain); Buena Vista Pictures Distribution (United States and Canada); PolyGram Filmed Entertainment (International)
- Release dates: December 1, 1995 (Spain); March 15, 1996 (U.S.)
- Running time: 118 minutes
- Countries: United States; Spain
- Language: English
- Budget: $24 million
- Box office: $13.6 million

Two Much is a 1995 romantic screwball comedy film based on Donald Westlake's novel of the same name, and is also a remake of the 1984 French comedy film Le Jumeau. Directed by Fernando Trueba, Two Much stars Antonio Banderas, Melanie Griffith, Daryl Hannah, and Danny Aiello. It was released in the United States by Touchstone Pictures. Lew Soloff composed the music for the film.

== Plot ==
Former artist Art Dodge is struggling to keep his art gallery open, unable to pay bills, his assistant Gloria or his artist Manny. To survive, he reads the obituaries and tries to convince the widows that the deceased purchased a painting shortly before dying.

When Art tries this scam with mobster Gene, whose father just died, he tries to have his henchmen beat him up. Art barely escapes by hiding in Betty Kerner's Rolls-Royce, Gene's estranged two-time ex-wife and wealthy heiress.

Betty is excited to help the handsome stranger, and they end up having sex. Impulsive, she wants to marry Art in two weeks, and the tabloids immediately unearth the story. Stuck between Betty who won't budge and Gene who still loves her, although Art isn't happy about it, he plays along.

One morning at Betty's, Art surprises her in the shower, naked. He sees it's not Betty, but her sister Liz, an art professor. He is attracted to her, but she is very cold and distant, seeing him as a gigolo. He invents a fake twin brother Bart (who wears glasses and has his hair down instead of in a ponytail), a painter who just returned from Italy.

Bart and Liz instantly hit it off while Gene still tries to romance Betty. They talk about everything, he plays with her dog and even invites her to Manny's studio, pretending it's his. When Liz's favorite painting in the studio turns out to actually be Art's (who gave it to Manny as an "advance" on what he owes him), he gives it to her.

Thanks to his imaginary twin brother, Art manages to romance both sisters. As the "twin brothers" can't be in the same place at the same time, it means a lot of running around, excuses and enlisting a very reluctant Gloria. One evening he needs to be on two simultaneous dates.

At the restaurant with Betty, he drugs her wine to shorten the date and puts a very sleepy Betty to bed. He then goes out with Liz (who chooses the same restaurant), also having sex with her. The next morning, Art/Bart has to run back and forth between the sisters' bedrooms as he's supposed to be with them simultaneously.

The night before the wedding, Art spots Gene's two henchmen near his house and escapes with his dad's help. He tries to spend the night at Gloria's but Manny is there, he gives him the studio's keys to spend the night. There, Art is painting again but is interrupted by the henchmen who start beating him up. When Art proposes leaving town, Gene insists he go ahead with the wedding and threatens to break one bone for each tear Betty cries.

After they leave, Liz arrives to the studio, thinking Bart got beat up. He tells her he is Art, that he fell in love when he saw her in the shower and tries to kiss her. She thinks Art is trying to make a pass at her, not realizing Bart is Art.

On the wedding day, Liz tells Bart his "brother" tried to kiss her, so the wedding should be called off. Bart needs to "confront" Art in a study alone, with Liz and Gene listening outside -and, unbeknownst to everyone, also by Betty through the phone. When Gene enters the study, he confronts Art alone, and again threatens him if he doesn't marry Betty. He insists that they want is irrelevant, and that the only thing that matters is Betty's happiness.

During the wedding ceremony, Betty, shaken by Gene's selfless devotion, calls the wedding off. Falling into Gene's arms, she admits she loves him too, and they elope. In the general confusion, Liz sees her dog wanting to play with Art and realizes he and Bart are the same person. Bart then gives Liz a fake excuse to "go back to Italy" (which she of course doesn't buy), adding he's not worthy.

Months later, Art's gallery is now very successful (Gloria owns and manages it, and Art is the artist). At the inauguration of his work, he notices Liz, who has feelings for him but is unsure of who he really is. Art convinces her he is the one she had feelings for, and the movie ends with them happily walking down the street, hand in hand.

== Cast ==
- Antonio Banderas as Art Dodge, "Bart Dodge"
- Melanie Griffith as Betty Kerner
- Daryl Hannah as Liz Kerner
- Danny Aiello as Gene
- Joan Cusack as Gloria
- Eli Wallach as Sheldon Dodge
- Gabino Diego as Manny
- Austin Pendleton as Dr. Huffeyer
- Allan Rich as Reverend Larrabee
- Vincent Schiavelli as Sommelier
- Phil Leeds as Lincoln Brigade
- Sid Raymond as Lincoln Brigade

== Reception ==
The film received negative reviews from critics. It holds a 14% rating on Rotten Tomatoes, based on 7 reviews.

The film was released in 140 cinemas in Spain and opened at number one at the Spanish box office with a record $1.3 million (159 million pesetas) opening weekend for a Spanish film. It was the highest-grossing film in Spain for the year with a gross of almost €7 million. In the United States and Canada, the film grossed $1.1 million.

Antonio Banderas was nominated for a Goya Award for his part, while both Melanie Griffith and Daryl Hannah received Golden Raspberry Awards and Stinkers Bad Movie Awards nominations for theirs as both Worst Actress and Worst Supporting Actress respectively. At the Razzies, Griffith lost the former category to Demi Moore for both The Juror and Striptease, while Hannah lost the latter category to Griffith for her performance in Mulholland Falls. At the Stinkers, Griffith lost Worst Actress to Whoopi Goldberg for Theodore Rex, Eddie, and Bogus; Hannah lost Worst Supporting Actress to Jami Gertz for Twister.

== Other ==
- Banderas and Griffith's on-screen relationship also developed off-screen, leading to their 1996 marriage.
- This movie is the remake of a French movie called Le jumeau ("The twin"). It borrows the main plot of a man struggling with bills, inventing a fake twin to seduce two wealthy sisters, as well as the "morning after", need-to-wake-up-next-to-both-sisters scene.
- It was also remade in Tamil as Naam Iruvar Namakku Iruvar (1998) with Prabhu Deva playing the lead role.
