= Madrid, 1987 =

- Theatrical release poster
- Directed by: David Trueba
- Written by: David Trueba
- Produced by: Jessica Berman
- Starring: José Sacristán; María Valverde
- Cinematography: Leonor Rodríguez
- Edited by: Marta Velasco
- Music by: David Trueba; Irene Rodríguez Temblay; Leonor Rodríguez
- Production company: Buenavida Producciones
- Distributed by: Breaking Glass Pictures
- Release dates: 22 September 2011 (SSIFF); 13 April 2012 (Spain)
- Running time: 105 minutes
- Country: Spain
- Language: Spanish
- Budget: $350,000
- Box office: $56,203 (Spain)

Madrid, 1987 is a 2011 Spanish drama film written and directed by David Trueba. It stars José Sacristán as an old, bitter journalist who attempts to seduce a young journalism student played by María Valverde. It premiered at the 2011 San Sebastián International Film Festival.

== Plot ==
In 1987, Miguel, an old and bitter journalist, agrees to meet with Ángela, an idealistic young journalism student, for an interview at a local restaurant. Ángela has missed many of her lectures and needs to write an essay; she has chosen to use Miguel as her subject. Throughout the interview, Miguel expresses his contempt for idealism and style. When he reads a sample of Ángela's writing, Miguel dismisses much of it, though he says that she is talented. He asks to keep the sample and invites Ángela to his friend Luis' house. Miguel explains that Luis will be gone until Monday, and they will have the place to themselves. She agrees, and they continue their discussions there over whiskey. Miguel walks over Luis' paintings, and, when Ángela objects, he says that Luis would prefer them to be marred by life and experience. Miguel alternates between cynical advice and derisively ridiculing romantic notions of journalism. Soon, he enters the bedroom and point blank asks Ángela to strip naked. When she balks, he tells her that he has been true to his nature and never hidden his motives. When she turns to leave, Miguel stops her and says that he hopes she will one day respect him for his boldness.

As Miguel smokes a cigarette, he hears the boards creaking, and Ángela steps through the doorway wearing nothing but an open shirt. Surprised, Miguel wordlessly spreads paint over her naked body. Ángela rises to wash it off, and he follows her to the bathroom. After they take turns in the shower, Ángela becomes frustrated when she cannot open the door. Miguel tries as well and concludes that it has locked from the outside. The bathroom has only one towel, and both are naked; when he realizes her discomfort, Miguel surrenders the towel to Ángela. The two continue their conversation from before, and Miguel alternates between attempts to seduce Ángela, giving cynical advice, and expressing his preference for whiskey and cigarettes over company with her. As time passes, the two become worried that they will be missed: Miguel by his wife, and Ángela by her parents. When Miguel learns that Ángela is the daughter of a prominent fascist soldier, he describes his run-ins with fascists and failed attempts to seduce Ángela's eldest sister. Although initially opposed to bringing in outside intervention, Miguel agrees that the risk of scandal is now outweighed by their desire to leave the bathroom. However, their cries out the window go apparently unheard.

As Miguel becomes despondent about the situation, his age, his attractiveness, and his foolish desire to seduce to a much younger woman, Ángela turns off the lights, drops her towel, and the two have sex. Afterward, Miguel dismisses her feelings of guilt and proclaims himself to have a more developed and profound sense of guilt. Ángela angrily accuses him of egotism, which she says she will write about in her essay. They quickly reconcile when a chastened Miguel offers to entertain Ángela with a story. The story, framed as an imaginary film that they are watching at the cinema, is about a boy who refuses to leave his bed under any circumstances. The boy insists that nothing is wrong with him; he simply desires not to leave his bed. When the boy mysteriously disappears, his parents are conflicted as to whether they should be glad he has left his bed or sad that he has run away. Before Miguel can end the story, Luis returns to rescue them, summoned by a worker who heard their earlier calls for help. Luis asks Miguel if he will see Ángela again, but Miguel is philosophical. He tells Luis to keep a pair of glasses that Ángela left behind and reasons that if she returns, it will be to Luis' house. The film ends as Ángela walks back to her parents' house.

== Cast ==
- José Sacristán as Miguel
- María Valverde as Ángela
- Ramon Fontserè as Luis

== Production ==
The film was shot in twelve days in Madrid. The inspiration for the film came from writer-director David Trueba's experiences as a young journalist in Spain in the 1980s.

== Release ==
Madrid, 1987 premiered 22 September 2011 at the San Sebastián International Film Festival. The international premiere was at the 2011 Sundance Film Festival. Breaking Glass Pictures released it on home video on 26 February 2013.

== Reception ==
Rotten Tomatoes, a review aggregator, reports that 86% of seven surveyed critics gave the film a positive review; the average rating was 6.6/10. Metacritic rated it 61/100 based on seven reviews. Rene Rodriguez of the Miami Herald rated it 3.5/4 stars and called it "an engrossing study of generational clash inside a locked bathroom." Jonathan Holland of Variety called it a "perceptive" and "ultra-wordy" film that will mostly appeal to Spanish art-house audiences. Sheri Linden of the Los Angeles Times wrote, "The actors give their characters a resonance beyond the symbolic, but the action doesn't quite transcend the stagy setup." John DeFore of The Hollywood Reporter wrote, "An engrossing two-hander combining the smart-talk microcosm of My Dinner With Andre and the sexual dynamics of a Philip Roth novel, David Trueba's Madrid, 1987 is more universal than its title suggests and holds a strong art house appeal." Jon Caramanica of The New York Times called it a "sweet, sometimes dull and certainly overlong film". Fionnuala Halligan of Screen Daily wrote, "It is, in fact, hard to think of a movie less cinematic than Madrid, 1987" and stated that it might make a better play than film. Ollie Coen of DVD Talk rated it 3/5 stars and wrote, "For an artsy movie about two people stuck naked in a bathroom together, you could do much worse. [...] It has a lot to say about youth, love, idealism, sex, and life in general."
