= Almost 40 =

- Theatrical release poster
- Spanish: Casi 40
- Directed by: David Trueba
- Written by: David Trueba
- Starring: Lucía Jiménez; Fernando Ramallo; Carolina África; Vito Sanz
- Cinematography: Julio César Tortuero
- Edited by: Marta Velasco
- Production companies: Buenavida Producciones; Perdidos GC
- Distributed by: Avalon Distribución
- Release dates: 20 April 2018 (Málaga); 29 June 2018 (Spain)
- Country: Spain
- Language: Spanish

Almost 40 (Spanish: Casi 40) is a 2018 Spanish road comedy-drama film written and directed by David Trueba which stars Lucía Jiménez and Fernando Ramallo. It is a sequel to the 1996 film The Good Life.

== Plot ==
Salesman of eco-friendly make-up products Tristán tries to relaunch the musical career of singer Lucía, Tristán's teen crush, so he arranges a concert tour across Spain for her.

== Cast ==
- Lucía Jiménez as Lucía
- Fernando Ramallo as Tristán
- Vito Sanz
- Carolina África

== Production ==
The film is a Buenavida Producciones and Perdidos GC production. Shooting locations included Burgos, Madrid, Plasencia, Salamanca, Segovia, and Urueña.

== Release ==
Almost 40 was presented at the 21st Málaga Film Festival on 20 April 2018. Distributed by Avalón Distribución, it was released theatrically in Spain on 29 June 2018.

== Reception ==
According to the review aggregation website Rotten Tomatoes, Almost 40 has a 100% approval rating based on 7 reviews from critics, with an average rating of 7.5/10.

Jonathan Holland of The Hollywood Reporter summed up "wit, wisdom and simplicity" as bottom line.

Àlex Montoya of Fotogramas rated the film 4 out of 5 stars, highlighting the chemistry of the protagonists and the truths they tell as the best things about the film.

== Accolades ==
Year	Award	Category	Nominee(s)	Result	Ref.
2019	6th Feroz Awards	Best Comedy Film		Nominated	

== See also ==
- List of Spanish films of 2018
