= The Good Life (1996 film) =

- Theatrical release poster
- Original title: La buena vida
- Directed by: David Trueba
- Written by: David Trueba
- Produced by: Ana Huete; Cristina Huete
- Starring: Fernando Ramallo; Lucía Jiménez; Luis Cuenca; Isabel Otero; Vicky Peña; Jordi Bosch; Joel Joan; Jesús Bonilla
- Cinematography: William Lubtchansky
- Edited by: Ángel Hernández Zoido
- Music by: Antoine Duhamel
- Production companies: Fernando Trueba PC; Kaplan; Olmo Films; L. Films; Academy Films
- Distributed by: United International Pictures
- Release date: 13 December 1996 (Spain)
- Running time: 1h 47min
- Countries: Spain; France; Italy
- Language: Spanish

The Good Life (Spanish: La buena vida) is a 1996 comedy-drama film written and directed by David Trueba, starring Fernando Ramallo and Lucía Jiménez.

== Cast ==
- Fernando Ramallo as Tristán
- Lucía Jiménez as Lucía
- Luis Cuenca as abuelo
- Isabel Otero as Isabel
- Joel Joan as Claudio
- Vicky Peña as madre
- Jordi Bosch as padre
- Jesús Bonilla
- Eloi Yebra as Félix
- Alicia Hermida as Flora
- Ramón Barea

== Production ==
The film is a Spanish-French-Italian co-production by Fernando Trueba PC, Kaplan, and Olmo Films alongside L. Films and Academy Pictures.

== Release ==
Distributed by United International Pictures (UIP), the film was released theatrically in Spain on 13 December 1996. It screened in the Directors' Fortnight at the 1997 Cannes Film Festival. It also screened at the 32nd Karlovy Vary International Film Festival in July 1997, winning the Special Jury Prize.

== Reception ==
Jonathan Holland of Variety deemed the film to be "a charming, carefully crafted and low-key tragicomedy".

== Sequel ==
Trueba wrote and directed a 2018 sequel, Almost 40, with Ramallo and Jiménez returning to their roles over two decades after.

== Accolades ==
Year	Award	Category	Nominee(s)	Result	Ref.
1997	11th Goya Awards	Best Original Screenplay	David Trueba	Nominated	
1997	11th Goya Awards	Best New Director	David Trueba	Nominated	
1997	11th Goya Awards	Best Supporting Actor	Luis Cuenca	Won	
1997	11th Goya Awards	Best New Actress	Lucía Jiménez	Nominated	

== See also ==
- List of Spanish films of 1996
