= Paloma Chen =

Chinese-Spanish poet and journalist (born 1997)

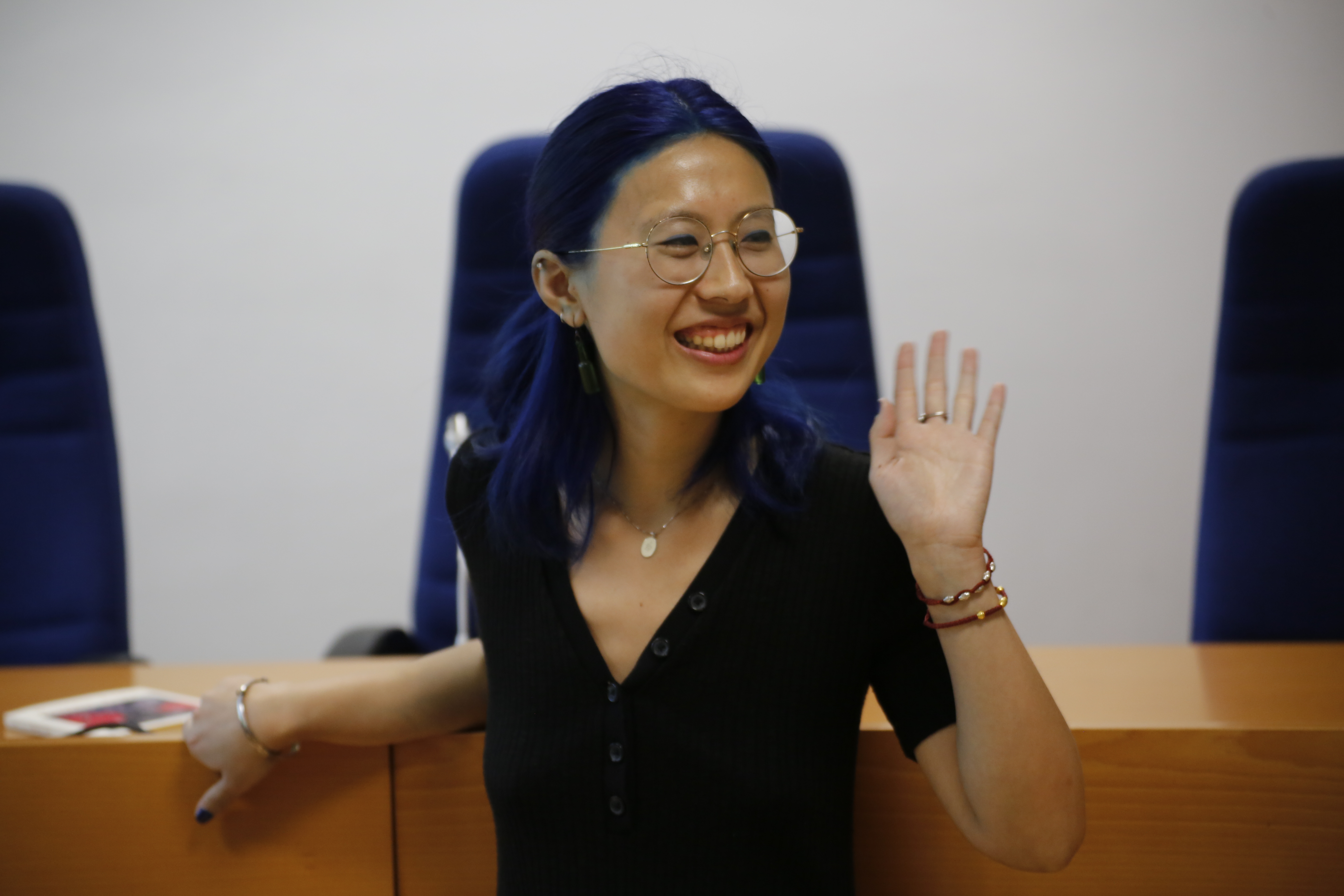
- The poet Paloma Chen at the University of Valencia
- Born: Paloma Chen; 28 October 1997 (age 29); Alicante, Spain
- Education: University of Valencia
- Occupations: journalist; poet

Paloma Chen (born 1997, Alicante) is a Chinese–Spanish poet and journalist. In 2021, she was awarded the Second Living Poetry Prize which she received at the Royal Spanish Academy.

== Biography ==
Chen was born in Alicante. Her parents moved to Spain from the Wenzhou region of China in the 1980s. The contrast of a woman born next to the Mediterranean Sea and who now masters the Spanish language and her difficulty she faced learning the language with her Chinese parents, is present in Chen's poetic work. Her education and life in and around her parents' restaurant in Utiel are a source of creativity that inspires many of her poetic works and writings. Chen was recognized in the 2014 to 2015 academic year with the extraordinary high school award from the Valencian Community. She studied journalism at the University of Valencia where she promoted the use of art and culture as tools for consensus and understanding among peoples. She founded a platform focused on the dissemination of interculturalism with activities which allow Chinese descendants to collaborate with Spanish and Latin American participants. As a journalist, she has worked for the EFE Agency and the communication departments of various institutions such as the Spanish Red Cross. She has worked in newspapers, including Verne-El País or El Salto.

Chen has participated in various intercultural projects such as Crecer en un Chino (Growing up in a Chinese restaurant/store), Tusanaje, or for taking part in the first Spanish meeting of the Chinese Diaspora. Under the Crecer en un Chino project, she conducted interviews with Chinese people in Spain, including one with the Taiwanese-Spanish singer Chenta Tsai Tseng.

Chen reached the final of the contest for the selection of winners of the II Premio de Poesía Viva (Second Live Poetry Prize) in Valencia. As a finalist, she read her meaningful poems on interculturalism and the experience of diverse cultural identities, combining the rhythm of the verses with the rhyming of the words. Her title work "Los estudiantes de Confucio con sombrero de paja" (Confucius's students with straw hats) was selected and received the award. Speaking at the event, Chen commented: "Dreaming is a language that is unaware of life as someone else that will always remain foreign." Her election as the winner in the final opened the doors to the auditorium of Royal Spanish Academy of Language, where on 5 October she was scheduled to appear together with the poet and narrator José María Merino, and Ana Merino, the poet who had received the Adonáis Prize for Poetry and the Nadal Prize.

On Monday, 15 March 2021, Chen received the Second Live Poetry Award (II Premio de Poesía Viva, Premio #LdeLírica) organized by Ámbito Cultural at the seat of the Royal Spanish Academy (RAE). The award ceremony took place in the presence of celebrities from the arts sphere, including Martirio (singer), winner of the National Prize for Contemporary Music, and Olvido García Valdés, winner of Spain's National Poetry Prize.

== Selected works ==
- 2021 Invocación a las mayorías silenciosas (Invocation to silent majorities), which received an award at the II Premio de Poesía Viva.

== Awards and achievements ==
- 2021: II Premio de Poesía Viva (Second Living Poetry Prize).
