= Insignificant Things =

- Theatrical release poster
- Directed by: Andrea Martínez
- Written by: Andrea Martínez
- Produced by: Guillermo del Toro; Bertha Navarro; Luis de Val
- Starring: Bárbara Mori; Fernando Luján; Carmelo Gómez; Lucía Jiménez
- Cinematography: Josep M. Civit
- Edited by: Ángel Hernández Zoido
- Music by: Leonardo Heiblum; Jacobo Lieberman
- Production companies: Tequila Gang; Manga Films; Media Films
- Distributed by: Warner Bros. Pictures
- Release dates: May 2008 (Cannes Film Festival); April 17, 2009 (Mexico); May 15, 2009 (Spain)
- Countries: Mexico; Spain
- Language: Spanish

Insignificant Things (Spanish: Cosas insignificantes) is a 2008 Mexican drama film directed by Andrea Martínez and produced by Guillermo del Toro. The cinematographer is by Josep M. Civit. The film was Martínez's directorial debut.

== Plot ==
The story centers around multiple characters in a suburb of Mexico City.

== Cast ==
- Bárbara Mori ... Paola
- Paulina Gaitán ... Esmeralda
- Carmelo Gómez ... Iván
- Blanca Guerra ... Mara
- Lucía Jiménez ... Eli
- Fernando Luján ... Augusto Gabrieli
- Arturo Ríos ... Tomás

== Reception ==
Comparing the film to Crash and Magnolia, a review in The Canberra Times said, "writer-director Andrea Martinez draws some powerful performances from her ensemble cast" and commended Civit's "warmly lit cinematography" which makes the film "an unmissable experience".
