= Fernando Trueba =

Spanish filmmaker and former book editor

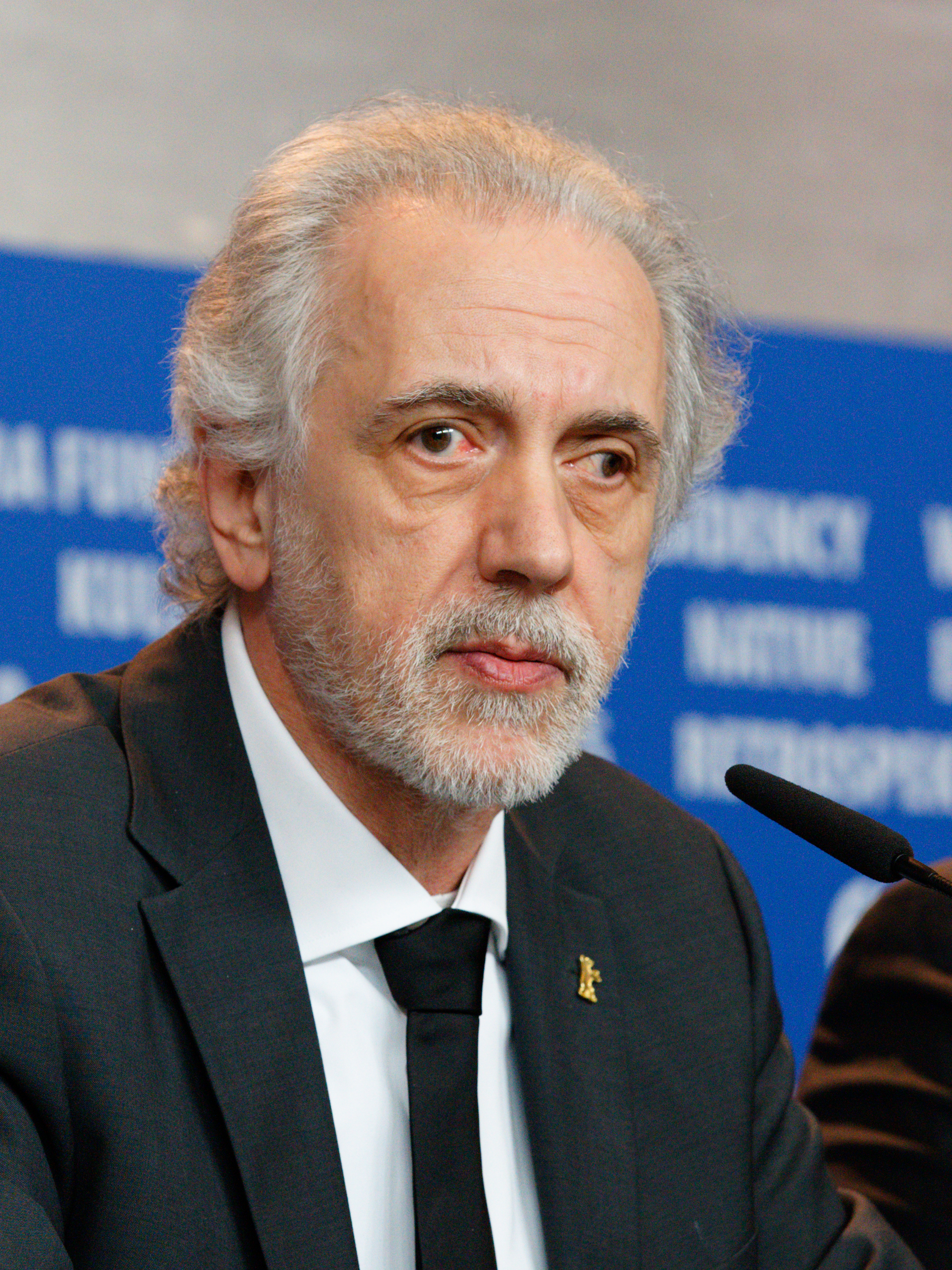
- Fernando Trueba in 2017
- Born: Fernando Rodríguez Trueba; 18 January 1955 (age 71); Madrid, Spain
- Occupations: Producer; film director; screenwriter
- Years active: 1974–present
- Spouse: Cristina Huete
- Children: Jonás Trueba
- Relatives: David Trueba (brother); Manuel Huete (father-in-law)

Fernando Rodríguez Trueba (born 18 January 1955), known as Fernando Trueba, is a Spanish filmmaker, writer, producer and book editor.

== Career ==
Between 1974 and 1979, Trueba worked as a film critic for Spain's leading daily newspaper El País. In 1980, he founded the monthly film magazine Casablanca, which he edited and directed during its first two years. He is the author of Diccionario (Planeta 1997, Plot 2004, Galaxia Guttenberg 2006) and the editor of Diccionario del Jazz Latino (SGAE, 1998).

== Accolades ==
Among other awards, he has won the Goya Award as Best Director three times and a Silver Bear for Year of Enlightment at the 37th Berlin International Film Festival. Miracle of Candeal won the Goya for Best Documentary, and Chico and Rita won the Goya for Best Feature Animation. In 1994, Trueba accepted the Oscar for Best Foreign Language Film on behalf of Spain for Belle Époque. In 1999, The Girl of Your Dreams was nominated for the Golden Bear at the 49th Berlin International Film Festival. In 2011 he won the Award of the Hungarian National Student Jury for Chico and Rita at the 7th Festival of European Animated Feature Films and TV Specials.

As a music producer he has won two Grammy Awards and four Latin Grammy Awards.

== Personal life ==
He is the elder brother of David Trueba. He is married to producer Cristina Huete, and he is the father of director Jonás Trueba.

== Filmography ==
=== Film ===
==== Feature Film ====
Year	Film	Director	Writer	Notes
1980	Opera prima	Yes	Yes	
1980	La Mano Negra	No	Yes	
1982	A Contratiempo	No	Yes	
1983	Sal gorda	Yes	Yes	
1985	Sé infiel y no mires con quién	Yes	Yes	
1985	De tripas corazón	No	Yes	
1986	El año de las luces	Yes	Yes	
1988	Miss Caribe	No	Yes	
1989	Twisted Obsession	Yes	Yes	
1992	Belle Époque	Yes	Story	
1995	Two Much	Yes	Yes	
1995	Suspiros de España (y Portugal)	No	Yes	
1998	La Niña De Tus Ojos	Yes	Uncredited	
2002	El Embrujo de Shangai	Yes	Yes	
2009	El Baile de la Victoria	Yes	Yes	
2010	Chico and Rita	Yes	Yes	Co-directed with Tono Errando and Javier Mariscal
2012	El Artista y la Modelo	Yes	Yes	
2016	La reina de España	Yes	Yes	
2020	Forgotten We'll Be	Yes	No	
2023	They Shot the Piano Player	Yes	Yes	Co-directed with Javier Mariscal
2024	Haunted Heart	Yes	Yes	

Producer only

Year	Film	Role
1981	Vecinos	Executive producer
1986	Lulú de noche	Producer
1988	El Juego Más Divertido	Executive producer
1991	Alas de Mariposa	Associate producer
1992	Sublet	Executive producer
1996	La Buena Vida	Producer

==== Short films ====
Year	Film	Director	Writer	Producer	Notes
1974	Oscar y Carlos	Yes	Yes	Yes	
1978	En Legítima Defensa	Yes	Yes	No	
1979	Homenage à trois	Yes	Yes	No	
1979	El León Enamorado	Yes	Yes	Yes	
1980	Koñensonaten	No	Yes	No	Segment of the anthology film "Cuentos Eróticos"
1980	Tunait is de nait	No	Yes	Executive	
1982	Oscar y Carlos 82	Yes	Yes	Yes	
2011	Café de Colombia	No	Idea	No	
2011	Versus	No	Yes	No	

=== Documentary ===
Year	Film	Director	Producer	Writer
1982	Mientras El Cuerpo Aguante	Yes	Yes	No
1995	Lumière and Company	Segment director	No	No
2000	Calle 54	Yes	Yes	Yes
2004	El Milagro de Candeal	Yes	No	No

Executive producer

- Blanco y Negro (2003)
- Wit (2004)
- Old Man Bebo (2008)

== Television ==
Year	Film	Director	Writer	Producer	Notes
1990	La Mujer de Tu Vida	Yes	Yes	Yes	Directed 1 episode; wrote 2 episodes and the story only for 1 episode; produced 4 episodes and executive produced 2 episodes
1990-1992	Magicians of the Earth	No	No	Yes	TV documentary series; 4 episodes
1993	El Trio en Mi Bemoll	Yes	Yes	No	TV movie
1994	La Mujer de tu Vida 2	No	Story	Yes	Worte the story for 1 episode; Executive produced 5 episodes and produced 2 episodes.
1996	Lumiere Sur Un Massacre	Yes	No	No	Directed 1 episode

== Discography as music producer ==
- 2000: Calle 54 (Soundtrack)
- 2002: Lágrimas Negras (Bebo & Cigala')
- 2003: We Could Make Such Beautiful Music Together (Bebo Valdés & Federico Britos)
- 2004: Bebo de Cuba (Bebo Valdés)
- 2005: Bebo (Bebo Valdés)
- 2006: Paz (Niño Josele)
- 2007: Live at the Village Vanguard (Bebo Valdés & Javier Colina)
- 2008: Juntos Para Siempre (Bebo Valdés & Chucho Valdés)
- 2009: Caribe - Michel Camilo Big Band (Michel Camilo)
- 2010: Española (Niño Josele)
