= The Flight of the Dove =

1989 Spanish film directed by José Luis García Sánchez

- Theatrical release poster
- Spanish: El vuelo de la paloma
- Directed by: José Luis García Sánchez
- Screenplay by: Rafael Azcona; José Luis García Sánchez
- Starring: Ana Belén; José Sacristán; Juan Luis Galiardo; Juan Echanove; Antonio Resines; Miguel Rellán; Luis Ciges; Manuel Huete
- Cinematography: Fernando Arribas
- Edited by: Pablo G. del Amo
- Music by: Mariano Díaz
- Production companies: Ion Films; Ames Films; Lola Films
- Distributed by: Warner Española
- Release dates: February 1989 (Berlinale); 15 February 1989 (Spain)
- Country: Spain
- Language: Spanish

The Flight of the Dove (Spanish: El vuelo de la paloma) is a 1989 Spanish comedy film directed by José Luis García Sánchez and written by Rafael Azcona and García Sánchez. The cast features Ana Belén, José Sacristán, Juan Luis Galiardo, Juan Echanove, Antonio Resines, Miguel Rellán, Luis Ciges, and Manuel Huete.

== Plot ==
Primarily taking place around the Plaza del Conde de Barajas in Madrid, the plot explores the plight of unsatisfied woman Paloma, married to Pepe and harassed by a fan (Juancho). Paloma's life is upended upon the arrival of a film set to the plaza where she lives, featuring film star Luis Doncel.

== Cast ==
- Ana Belén as Paloma
- José Sacristán as Pepe
- Juan Luis Galiardo as Luis Doncel
- Juan Echanove as Juancho
- Antonio Resines as Toñito
- Miguel Rellán as Miguel
- Luis Ciges as Columela
- Manuel Huete as Ciri
- José María Cañete as Cañete
- Amparo Valle as Paula
- María Adánez as Palomita

== Production ==
García Sánchez and Azcona conceived of the film during factory work hours, and met each morning to develop the script together. They incorporated current events such as the 1988 Spanish general strike as they were happening, as these were not part of the original concept. The film is a Ion Films, Ames Films, and Lola Films production.

== Release ==
The film was presented in the Panorama section of the 39th Berlin International Film Festival in February 1989. It was released theatrically in Spain on 15 February 1989. A Contracorriente Films re-released a digital copy in 2018.

== Reception ==
Ángel Fernández-Santos of El País considered that the film is underpinned by both "an excellent script" by Rafael Azcona and a long cast that "achieve a memorable ensemble creation". Javier Yuste of El Español noted how crude humor of the film is no longer acceptable for more modern sensibilities, especially with how the film tackles "pedophilia, racism, sexism, political reconciliation, and workers' rights."

== Accolades ==
Year	Award	Category	Nominee(s)	Result	Ref.
1990	4th Goya Awards	Best Original Screenplay	Rafael Azcona, José Luis García Sánchez	Nominated	
1990	4th Goya Awards	Best Actress	Ana Belén	Nominated	
1990	4th Goya Awards	Best Supporting Actor	Juan Luis Galiardo	Nominated	
1990	4th Goya Awards	Best Supporting Actor	Manuel Huete	Nominated	
1990	4th Goya Awards	Best Supporting Actor	Juan Echanove	Nominated	

== See also ==
- List of Spanish films of 1989
