= The Queen of Spain =

- Spanish: La reina de España
- Directed by: Fernando Trueba
- Written by: Fernando Trueba
- Produced by: Penélope Cruz; Anne Deluz; Cristina Huete; Judit Stalter
- Starring: Penélope Cruz; Antonio Resines; Neus Asensi; Ana Belén; Javier Cámara; Chino Darín; Loles León; Arturo Ripstein; Jorge Sanz; Rosa Maria Sardà; Santiago Segura; Clive Revill; Cary Elwes; Mandy Patinkin
- Cinematography: José Luis Alcaine
- Edited by: Marta Velasco
- Music by: Zbigniew Preisner
- Production companies: Fernando Trueba PC; Atresmedia Cine
- Distributed by: Universal Pictures
- Release dates: 25 November 2016 (Spain); February 2017 (Berlin)
- Country: Spain
- Languages: Spanish; English
- Box office: $1.2 million

The Queen of Spain (Spanish: La reina de España) is a 2016 Spanish comedy-drama film written and directed by Fernando Trueba. Starring Penélope Cruz, Antonio Resines, Neus Asensi, Ana Belén, Javier Cámara, Chino Darín, Loles León, Arturo Ripstein, Jorge Sanz, Rosa Maria Sardà, Santiago Segura, Clive Revill (in his final film role), Cary Elwes and Mandy Patinkin, it was shown in the Berlinale Special section of the 67th Berlin International Film Festival.

The film is a sequel to Trueba's 1998 drama The Girl of Your Dreams with Cruz, Resines, Asensi, León, Sanz, Sardà and Segura reprising their roles from the previous film.

It was nominated for 5 Goya Awards at the 31st Goya Awards, without winning any, including the nomination for Cruz as Best Actress for the same role for which she had won the Best Actress Award at the 13th Goya Awards, making her the first actress to be nominated twice for the same role in two different films.

== Plot ==
Nearly twenty years after the events of The Girl of Your Dreams, the story follows Macarena Granada (Penélope Cruz), now a successful Hollywood star in the 1950s. She returns to Francoist Spain to film a big-budget historical epic about Queen Isabella I, financed by an American studio. The production, led by "legendary" director John Scott (Clive Revill), starring Gary Jones (Cary Elwes) and produced by Jordan Berman (Mandy Patinkin), is meant as to promote a better image for Francoist Spain.

Spanish film director Blas, who was Granada's love interest in Girl, is now imprisoned by Franco's government for his past political activities. Determined to rescue him, Macarena and the film crew devise an elaborate plan to break Blas out of jail, using the Hollywood production as cover for their scheme.

During the filming of a ballroom scene at a royal palace the crew executes a prison break that outwits the authorities.

Blas is freed. Macarena discards the threats of Franco himself, who visits the set. She reconciles with her past and her Spanish roots, and completes the film.

== Cast ==
- Penélope Cruz as Macarena Granada
- Antonio Resines as Blas Fontiveros
- Neus Asensi as Lucía Gandía
- Ana Belén as Ana
- Javier Cámara as Pepe Bonilla
- Chino Darín as Leo
- Loles León as Trinidad "Trini" Morenos
- Arturo Ripstein as Sam Spiegelman
- Jorge Sanz as Julián Torralba
- Rosa Maria Sardà as Rosa Rosales
- Santiago Segura as Castillo
- Clive Revill as John Scott
- Cary Elwes as Gary Jones
- Mandy Patinkin as Jordan Berman
- Carlos Areces as Francisco Franco
- Aida Folch
- Jesús Bonilla as Marco Bonilla
- Ramón Barea as Ramón
- J. A. Bayona
- Guillermo Toledo
- Alberto San Juan
- Julio Vélez

== Production ==
The film was produced by Fernando Trueba PC and Atresmedia Cine and it had the participation of Movistar+. Marta Velasco was responsible for film editing.

== Reception ==
On the review aggregator website Rotten Tomatoes, 30% of 27 critics' reviews are positive. Metacritic, which uses a weighted average, assigned the film a score of 46 out of 100, based on 11 critics, indicating "mixed or average" reviews.

== Accolades ==
Year	Award	Category	Nominee(s)	Result	Ref.
2017	31st Goya Awards	Best Actress	Penélope Cruz	Nominated	
2017	31st Goya Awards	Best Cinematography	José Luis Alcaine	Nominated	
2017	31st Goya Awards	Best Art Direction	Juan Pedro de Gaspar	Nominated	
2017	31st Goya Awards	Best Production Supervision	Pilar Robla	Nominated	
2017	31st Goya Awards	Best Costume Design	Lala Huete	Nominated	
