= Manuel Huete =

Spanish cartoonist and actor

- Born: 1 January 1922; Madrid, Spain
- Died: 18 January 1999 (aged 77)
- Occupations: cartoonist, actor
- Children: Cristina and Lala

Manuel Huete Aguilar (1922 - 1999) was a comic artist and Spanish actor.

== Biography ==
He is the father of the producer Cristina Huete and the costume designer Lala Huete, and grandfather of the screenwriter and director Jonás Trueba. During the 1940s, he worked as a cartoonist of adventure and science fiction comics for Ediciones Rialto, Ediciones Marisal and Ediciones Maravillas, edited by Falange Española de las JONS. In 1986, he participated in the script of Year of Enlightment and since the 70s he collaborated in some films as a supporting actor, such as in Sal gorda (1984) or The Court of the Pharaoh (1985). In 1990, he was nominated for Goya Award for Best Supporting Actor for his portrayal in The Flight of the Dove. He died in Madrid on January 18, 1999 at the age of 77, being cremated in the funeral home of the Almudena Cemetery.

== Filmography ==
Filmography is as follows:

- Sal gorda (1984)
- La corte de Faraón (1985)
- Hay que deshacer la casa (1986)
- El año de las luces (1986)
- Pasodoble (1988)
- Miss Caribe (1988)
- El vuelo de la paloma (1989)
- El baile del pato (1989)
- Bajarse al moro (1989)
- Belle Époque (1992)
- Suspiros de España (y Portugal) (1995)
