= Buena Fe (band) =

Cuban pop music band

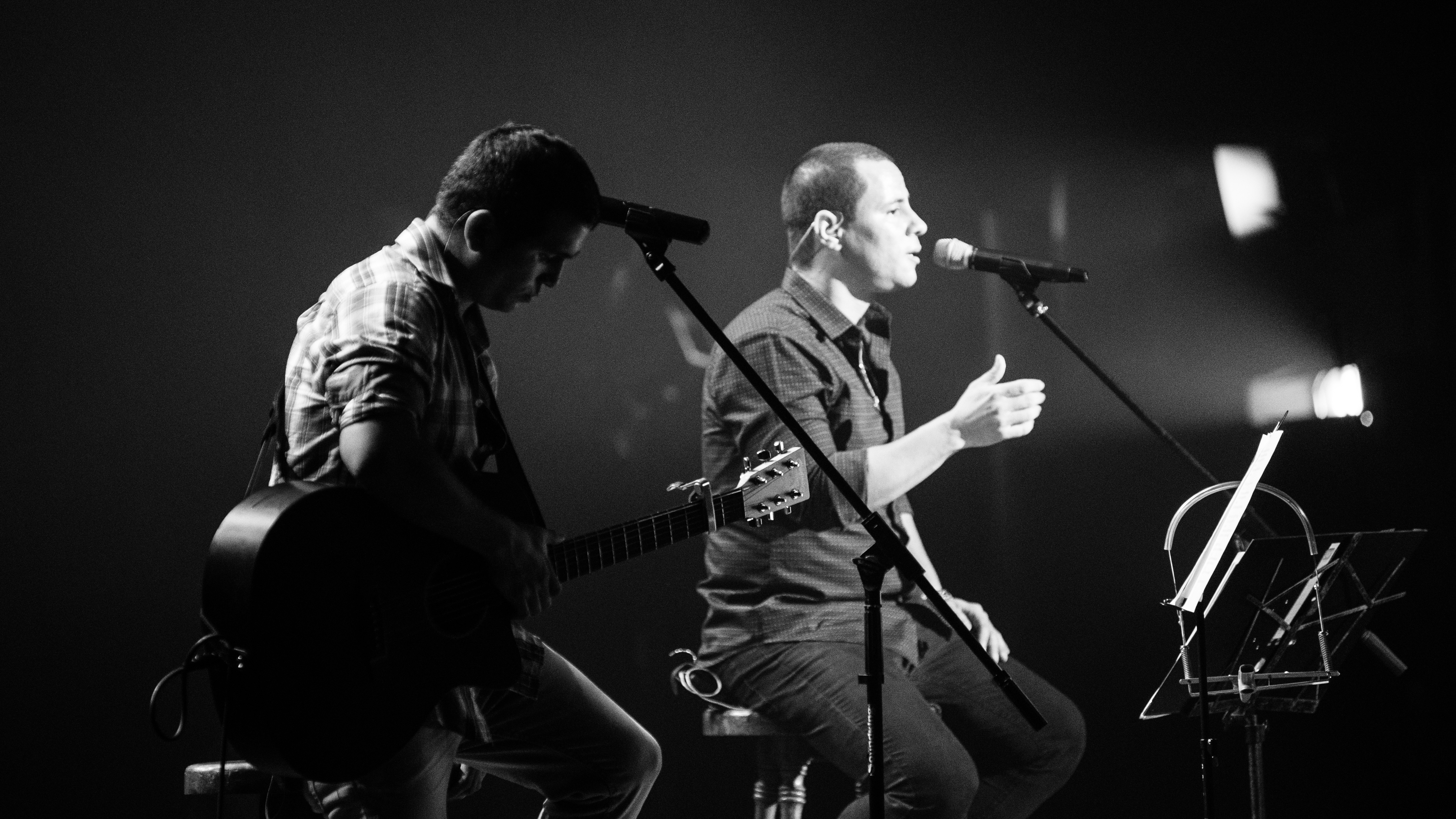
- Israel Rojas (right) and Yoel Martínez (left), before a live presentation in Cuba, April 19, 2008.

Background information
- Origin: Guantánamo, Cuba
- Genres: Pop • alternative rock
- Years active: 1999-present
- Label: Metamorfosis
- Members: Israel Rojas Fiel, Yoel Martínez Rodríguez Manager: Javier Otero
- Website: buena-fe.com

Buena Fe is a pop music band from Cuba, formed in 1999 in the province of Guantánamo, initially composed only of Israel Rojas Fiel and Yoel Martínez Rodríguez. They have released ten studio albums: Déjame entrar (2001), Arsenal (2003), Corazonero (2004), Presagios (2006), Catalejo (2008), Pi (3,14) (2010), Dial (2013), Soy (2015), Sobreviviente (2017) and Carnal (2019).

The name, "Buena Fe", translates literally to "Good Faith" in Spanish, but idiomatically as "Good Will".

== History ==
Israel Rojas Fiel, a lawyer, and Yoel Martínez Rodríguez, a music student, formed the duo. In November 1999, they made their debut with the song Intimidad. As a result, the Association "Hermanos Saíz" in Guantánamo invited the duo to join them.

In 2001 they moved to Havana to record their first album, Déjame entrar (English: Let me in). Once in Habana, they joined the agency Musicuba, of the label EGREM. Since then they adopted the band format.

On May 13, 2007 [check year], the group announced the death of its guitarist Dairon Rodríguez Lobaina, who died at the age of 32 due to a heart attack.

== Style ==
The music of Buena Fe has unique sound and compositions. The trova influences are present in their lyrics, which contain thoughts about contemporary life, with contemporary sonority, allowing arrangements that make each song fit in many Cuban genres, with influences from pop and rock.

Although the experts include them in the pop genre, according to Israel they make fusion music based in the trova style; and, while having pop tendencies, they use other styles and influences as well, which allows them to present more elaborate ideas. Also according to Israel, although they don't claim to be a pop band, they are not concerned with being classified as such, but however he thinks that they do more than pop music.

According to Yoel, they make a fusion using pop music and trova, besides playing with other styles to keep the texts flowing. Also according to Yoel, some say that Buena Fe makes trova if playing with the guitar alone; and makes Cuban pop rock if playing with the band; and this might be true, except for the fact that they also experiment a lot.

They try to avoid categories; trying to make prevail the poetry and the venturous verse; trying to wrap it with pop rock sonorities, but with a direct link to what used to be the intelligent songs that was made from the 60s to the 80s in Cuba.

== Discography ==
=== Déjame entrar ===
Déjame entrar (English: Let me in) is the first studio album released by Buena Fe. It was released in 2001.

The album is an invitation to think about the problems of the contemporary people. Its style ranges from son and guaracha to reggae, pop rock, and trova, including the fusion of flamenco.

It was nominated to the award Cubadisco 2002 in the categories Design and Pop. It was awarded the Cubadisco 2002 in the category of <Ópera prima>.

Track list:

1. "Déjame entrar" (3:25)
2. "Sicología al día" (3:22)
3. "Como un espejismo" (2:58)
4. "La zanja" (4:24)
5. "La ventana" (2:41)
6. "Guantanamero" (4:01)
7. "Como el neanderthal" (2:52)
8. "No juegues con mi soledad" (3:16)
9. "Puede que sí, puede que no" (3:13)
10. "El destino de la abeja" (3:17)
11. "Para no ver eso" (3:30)
12. "Fuego y balacera" (2:50)

=== Arsenal ===
Arsenal (English: Arsenal) is the second studio album released by Buena Fe. It was released in 2003.

The album was nominated to the Cubadisco 2003 awards, in the categories of Recording, Production, and Design. It was awarded the Cubadisco 2003 in the category of Pop, as well as the award EGREM 2004 in the same category.

Track list:

1. "Arsenal" (4:29)
2. "To be or no te vi" (4:33)
3. "Tras tus pies" (4:59)
4. "Buen viaje" (4:39)
5. "Intimidad" (4:00)
6. "Nunca digas nunca" (4:15)
7. "Cuando te amo" (4:12)
8. "Soñar en azul" (3:35)
9. "Noviembre" (3:46)
10. "Parque de provincia" (4:17)
11. "Propuesta" (3:36)
12. "Fin de fiesta" (4:25)

=== Corazonero ===
Corazonero (English: HeartFixer) is the third studio album released by Buena Fe. It was released in 2004.

Track list:

1. "Llegaré, llegaré" (3:16)
2. "El duende del bache" (3:53)
3. "Fiarme de ti" (4:44)
4. "Soy" (5:11)
5. "Nacimos ángeles" (3:16)
6. "Por si las moscas" (4:32)
7. "Navegando a la deriva" (4:39)
8. "Corazonero" (3:09)
9. "Puesta de sol" (5:14)
10. "Cuando tú me faltas" (3:36)
11. "Sé de un ser" (3:20)
12. "Dios salve al rey" (5:04)
13. "Corazonero (rap)" (3:05)

This album was nominated for the Cubadisco 2005 award in the category Pop/Fusion. It won the award EGREM 2005 in the category Pop rock and the award Cubadisco 2005 in the category Graphic design.

=== Presagios ===
Presagios (English: Premonitions) is the fourth studio album released by Buena Fe. It was released in 2006.

This album won the award Cubadisco in 2007, in the Pop Rock category.

Track list:

1. "Quien es" (5:15)
2. "Contragolpe" (4:27)
3. "Das más" (3:15)
4. "Nalgas" (4:40)
5. "Con hijo incluido" (4:37)
6. "Sola va ya" (4:15)
7. "El eco de las plazas" (3:57)
8. "Sigo cayendo" (4:06)
9. "Premoniciones" (4:21)
10. "Si la vida pide vía" (4:00)
11. "Vamos corazón" (3:40)
12. "Gracias por el fuego" (4:38)

=== Catalejo ===
Catalejo (English: Spyglass) is the fifth studio album of Buena Fe. It was released in 2008.

The album contains social thinkings about the Cuban way of life and the world's; being also present the topic of love, in ballads such as Lástima.

Track list:

1. "Los barcos en el puerto"
2. "Cada país"
3. "La primera vez"
4. "En cueros"
5. "Lástima"
6. "Fuera"
7. "Catalejo"
8. "Los fantasmas"
9. "Verso A. Machado"
10. "A la muerte"
11. "Era mi aire"
12. "Viernes, Sábado y Domingo"
13. "Soy lo que ves"

=== Pi 3,14 ===
Pi 3,14 is the sixth studio album of Buena Fe. It was released in 2010.

Continue their line of work where Israel Rojas, the author of all the issues, go to an acute reflection on the national and international society and its components, and to make an aside to question also specific ways philosophical concepts of human behavior.

Track list:

1. "Lo que fue"
2. "Dos Emigrantes"
3. "Pi" (3,14)
4. "Libre"
5. "Mamífero Nacional" (feat. Elíades Ochoa)
6. "La sospecha"
7. "Contracorriente"
8. "Despedida" (feat. Pablo Milanés)
9. "Lotería nono"
10. "Mar Adentro"
11. "Miedos" (feat. Aldeanos)
12. "Todo el mundo cuenta"

=== Dial (2013) ===
- 1- Acompáñame
- 2- Buena hembra, mala sangre
- 3- Pasa o parece
- 4- Ojeo
- 5- Volar sin ti(feat. Andres Suarez)
- 6- Si yo fuera
- 7- Pablo
- 8- Se bota a matar
- 9- La culpa
- 10- De proa a popa
- 11- Papel en blanco
- 12- Dial
- 13- Corazón Universidad

=== Soy (2015) ===
- 01- Pi 3,14
- 02- Soy
- 03- Catalejo
- 04- Volar sin ti
- 05- Miedos
- 06- Despedida
- 07- Noviembre
- 08- Nalgas
- 09- Si yo fuera
- 10- Dame guerra
- 11- No juegues con mi soledad
- 12- La culpa
- 13- En cueros
- 14- Papel en blanco
- 15- Casanova, Cecilia Valdes y la Bella Durmiente
- 16- Orare

=== Sobreviviente (2017) ===
- 01- Sin Arrepentimiento
- 02- Sobreviviente
- 03- Dijo el Diablo
- 04- La Tempestad (feat. Silvio Rodríguez)
- 05- Si Nos Dan un Filo
- 06- Bolero Sangriento
- 07- Besos
- 08- Alabanza
- 09- De Ti Depende
- 10- Lágrimas Tras Cebollas
- 11- Una Mujer (feat. Luna Manzanares)
- 12- Bodas
- 13- Hipibano (feat. Frank Delgado & Vicente)

=== Carnal (2019) ===
- 01- Patakí de libertad
- 02- Valientes
- 03- Sobre el arte de retoñar
- 04- La Catrina
- 05- Carnal
- 06- Mía
- 07- Cámara lenta
- 08- Quién soy yo
- 09- Mujer ciudad
- 10- Cuatro cuentos
- 11- Ni una más
- 12- Blues que Guateque
- 13- Música vital
- 14- Madurar
