= Carlos Cano =

Peruvian actor (1955–2015)

Carlos Cano de la Fuente (3 October 1955 – 23 December 2015) was a Peruvian actor.

He was married to actress Patricia Frayssinet, with whom he had three children: Alonso Cano, Carolina Cano (both actors), and Rodrigo Cano.

== Filmography ==
- La Casa de Enfrente (1984)
- Páginad de la Vida (1984)
- Carmín (1985)
- Los de Arriba y los de Abajo (1995)
- Los Unos y Los Otros (1995)
- Tribus de la Calle (1996)
- Lluvia de Arena (1996)
- Todo se Compra, todo se vende (1997)
- La Rica Vicky (1998)
- Procura Amarme Más (1999)
- Estrellita (2000)
- Éxtasis (2001)
- Cazando a un Millonario (2001)
- Mil Oficios (2001–2002)
- Que buena raza (2002–2003)
- Demasiada belleza (2003)
- Luciana y Nicolás (2003)
- Eva del Edén (2004)
- La Pre (2008)
- La Perricholi (2011)
- Avenida Perú (2013)

== Television series ==
- El Conspirador (1981)
- Matrimonios y algo más (1983)
- Gamboa (1983–85)
- Túpac Amaru (1984)
- César Vallejo (1986)
- El Proceso (1986)
- Raymondi por las Rutas del Perú (1989)
- La Perricholi (1992)
- Bolero (1993)
- Bajo el Mismo Cielo (1997)
- Sarita Colonia (2001)
- El faro (2003)
- Así es la vida (2004–2005)
- Los del solar (2005)
- Condominio S.A. (2006)
- Desde tu butaca (2006–2007)
- Diablos Azules (2007–2008)
- Operación rescate (2010).
- Adiós al 7º de línea (Chile) (2010)
- Conversando con la luna (2012)
- Al fondo hay sitio (2012)
- Guerreros de arena (2013)
- Comando Alfa (2013)

== Movies ==
- Túpac Amaru (1984)
- Dónde está el Muerto (1985)
- Bajo tu piel (1986)
- La fuga del chacal (1987)
- Ultra Warrior (1990)
- Reportaje a la muerte (1993)
- Días de Santiago (2004)
- Domingo (2004)
- La gran sangre: la película (2007)
- Motor y Motivo (2009)
- City Garden (2010)
- Casa Rosada (2011)
- Detrás del espejo (2012)
- Asu Mare (2013)
- El Gran Pajatén (2015)
- Paititi, la ciudad prohibida (2015)
