= Calle 54 =

- Theatrical poster
- Directed by: Fernando Trueba
- Written by: Fernando Trueba
- Produced by: Cristina Huete; Fabienne Servan-Schreiber; Fernando Trueba
- Cinematography: José Luis López-Linares
- Edited by: Carmen Frías
- Music by: Graeme Revell
- Distributed by: Buena Vista International; Miramax Films
- Release date: 8 September 2000
- Running time: 105 minutes
- Countries: Spain; France; Italy
- Languages: Spanish; French; English

Calle 54 is a 2000 documentary film about Latin jazz by Spanish director Fernando Trueba. With only minimal introductory voiceovers, the film consists of studio performances by a wide array of Latin Jazz musicians. The film takes its name from Sony Music Studios, where much of the film was shot, which are located on 54th Street in New York City. "The Latin World, so vague nowadays, mainly for the worst reasons, finds its most noble, exalted, sophisticated, and exuberant expression through jazz. This music has given me so much pleasure and has helped me like no other. Calle 54 is my way of paying a debt. And, as I've always believed that the main function of art is to help people to live, I've tried in this film to transmit the joy of this music and my passion for it." - Fernando Trueba

== Performances ==
=== Paquito D'Rivera: Panamericano ===
Performed by Paquito D'Rivera on alto sax and clarinet, Diego Urcola on trumpet, Aquiles Báez on guitar, Raul Jaurena on bandoneón, Dave Samuels on vibes and marimba, Darío Eskenazi on piano, Oscar Stagnaro on bass, Mark Walker on drums, Pernell Saturino on percussion, Milton Cardona on voice and batá (iyá), José Fernández on batá (okónkolo), and Abi Holliday on batá (itótele)

=== Eliane Elías: Samba Triste ===
Performed by Eliane Elías on piano, Marc Johnson on bass, and Satoshi Takeishi on drums

=== Chano Dóminguez: Oye Cómo Viene ===
Performed by Chano Dóminguez on piano, Guillermo McGill on drums, Javier Colina on bass, Blas Córdoba "El Kejío" as flamenco singer and claps, Tomás Moreno "Tomasito" on dance and claps, and Israel Suárez "Piraña" on cajón and claps

=== Jerry González & The Fort Apache Band: Earth Dance ===
Performed by Jerry González on flugelhorn and congas, Larry Willis on piano, Steve Berrios on drums, Andy González on bass, and Joe Ford on alto saxophone

=== Michel Camilo: From Within ===
Performed by Michel Camilo on piano, Anthony Jackson on six-string bass, and Horacio "El Negro" Hernández on drums

=== Gato Barbieri: Introducción, Llamerito y Tango/Bolivia ===
Performed by Gato Barbieri on tenor saxophone, Mark Soskin on piano, Mario Rodríguez on bass, Robbie González on drums, and Frank Colón on percussion

=== Tito Puente: New Arrival ===
Performed by Tito Puente on timbales and vibes, Hilton Ruiz on piano, Giovanni Hidalgo on congas, Mario Rivera on tenor saxophone, Dave Valentin on flute, Joe Santiago on bass

=== Chucho Valdés: Caridad Amaro ===
Performed by Jesús "Chucho" Valdés on piano

=== Chico O'Farrill: Afro-Cuban Jazz Suite ===
Performed by Chico O'Farrill as director, Arturo O'Farrill on piano, Michael Mossman on trumpet, Jim Seeley as second trumpet, Matt Hilgenberg as third trumpet, Jon Owens as fourth trumpet, Peter Brainin as tenor saxophone and clarinet, Richard Perry on alto saxophone, Mike Migliore on tenor saxophone and clarinet, Marshall McDonald on alto saxophone and clarinet, Max Schweiger on baritone saxophone, Rick Stepton on trombone, "Papo" Vázquez on trombone, Sam Burtis on trombone, Jack Jeffers on bass trombone, Andy González on bass, Joe González on bongos and percussion, Rolando Guerrero on congas, and Horacio "El Negro" Hernández on drums

=== Bebo Valdés and Cachao: Lágrimas Negras ===
Performed by Bebo Valdés on piano and Israel López Cachao on bass

=== Orlando "Puntilla" Ríos and Nueva Generación: Compa Galletano ===
Performed by Orlando Puntilla Ríos on congas, cajón, and voice, Pedro Martínez on voice, congas, and cajón, Román Díaz on congas, batás, cajón, and voice, Pedro Valdés on shékere, Félix Sanabria on claves, Rosalía Gamboa on dance, Felix Insúa on dance. Guest musicians include: Carlos Patato Valdés on congas, and Andy González on bass

=== Bebo Valdés and Chucho Valdés: La Comparsa ===
Performed by Bebo Valdés and Chucho Valdés on piano

== Reception ==
On review aggregator website Rotten Tomatoes, the film holds an approval rating of 87% based on 47 reviews, with an average rating of 7.9/10.
