= Cristina Huete =

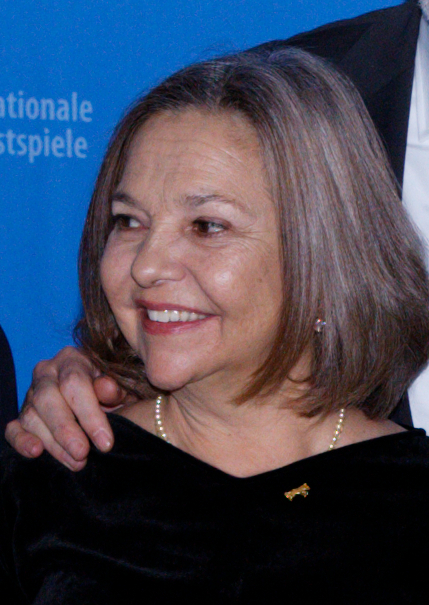
Huete attending the presentation of The Queen of Spain at the 2017 Berlinale.

Cristina Huete is a Spanish film producer.

She was born in São Paulo, Brazil. Her father was Manuel Huete, a Spanish comic book illustrator who also worked as an actor and lived in Venezuela and Brazil. Her sister Lala is a costume designer, while her sisters Ana and Angélica have also pursued careers as film producers.

A recurring producer of the films directed by her husband Fernando Trueba (Note: With whom she had one son, Jonás Groucho.) (and also her brother-in-law David Trueba), she first collaborated with her husband in documentary film Mientras el cuerpo aguante (1982). She has since been the producer of over 20 films, including Belle Époque (1992), Two Much (1995), The Girl of Your Dreams (1998), Calle 54 (2000), Chico and Rita (2010), Living Is Easy with Eyes Closed (2013), The Queen of Spain (2016), and They Shot the Piano Player (2023). She was invited to membership in the AMPAS in 2019.
