= Concha Piquer =

Spanish singer and actress

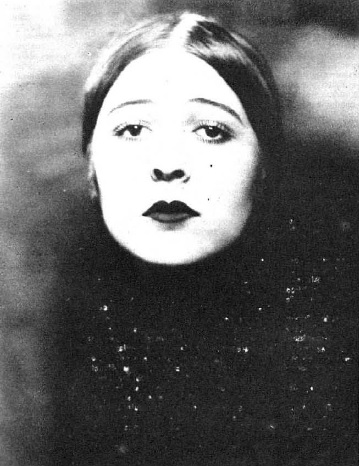
- Piquer in 1927

Background information
- Also known as: Doña Concha (Mrs Concha), La Gran Señora de la Copla ("The Great Lady of Copla"),
- Born: María de la Concepción Piquer López; 13 December 1906; Valencia, Spain
- Died: 12 December 1990 (aged 83) Madrid, Spain
- Genres: Copla; Cuplé; Pasodoble
- Occupations: Singer; Actress
- Instrument: Vocals
- Years active: 1922–1958 (recordings until 1963)
- Spouse: Antonio Márquez Serrano (bullfighter)

María de la Concepción Piquer López (13 December 1906 – 12 December 1990), better known as Concha Piquer (and sometimes billed as Conchita Piquer), was a Spanish singer and actress. She was known for her work in the copla form, and she performed her own interpretations of some of the key pieces in the Spanish song tradition, mostly works of the mid-20th century trio of composers Antonio Quintero, Rafael de León y Manuel Quiroga.

== Biography ==
Piquer was born in Valencia, Spain. In 1922, she made her stage debut in New York City at the age of 14, and later appeared with Eddie Cantor, Al Jolson, and Fred and Adele Astaire. On 15 April 1923, she appeared in a short film, From Far Seville, made by Lee de Forest in his Phonofilm sound-on-film process, and shown at the Rivoli Theater in New York City that is considered to be the first sound-integrated film in history. This film is now in the Maurice Zouary collection at the U.S. Library of Congress.

Piquer died in Madrid on 12 December 1990.

== Discography ==
=== Studio albums ===
(Original titles with English translations)

- Conchita Piquer en la intimidad (1961) — Conchita Piquer in Intimacy
- Conchita Piquer (1962) — (Self-titled: Conchita Piquer)
- Canciones del espectáculo Puente de coplas (1964) — Songs from the Show "Puente de Coplas"

=== Compilation albums ===
(Original titles with English translations)

- 10 creaciones ("10 Creations") (1958)
- Sus grandes éxitos ("Her Greatest Hits") (1958)
- Canciones de oro ("Golden Songs") (1986)
- Antología ("Anthology") (1986)

== Filmography ==
Year	Title	Country	Director	Role	Notes
1923	From Far Seville / De la lejana Sevilla.	United States	Lee De Forest	Herself	Documentary / Short film
1927	El negro que tenía el alma blanca / Le danseur de jazz.	(Spain) España; France	Benito Perojo	Emma	Silent film
1930	Wine Cellars.	(Spain) España; France	Benito Perojo	María Luz	
1934	Yo canto para ti.	(Spain) España	Fernando Roldán		
1940	La Dolores.	(Spain) España	Florián Rey	Dolores	
1949	Filigrana.	(Spain) España	Luis Marquina	María Paz Alcolea "Filigrana"	
1954	Me casé con una estrella.	Argentina	Luis César Amadori	Gloria María del Carmen Soler	
1975	Canciones de nuestra vida	(Spain) España	Eduardo Manzanos Brochero	Herself	Documentary
