= David Trueba =

Spanish novelist and film director

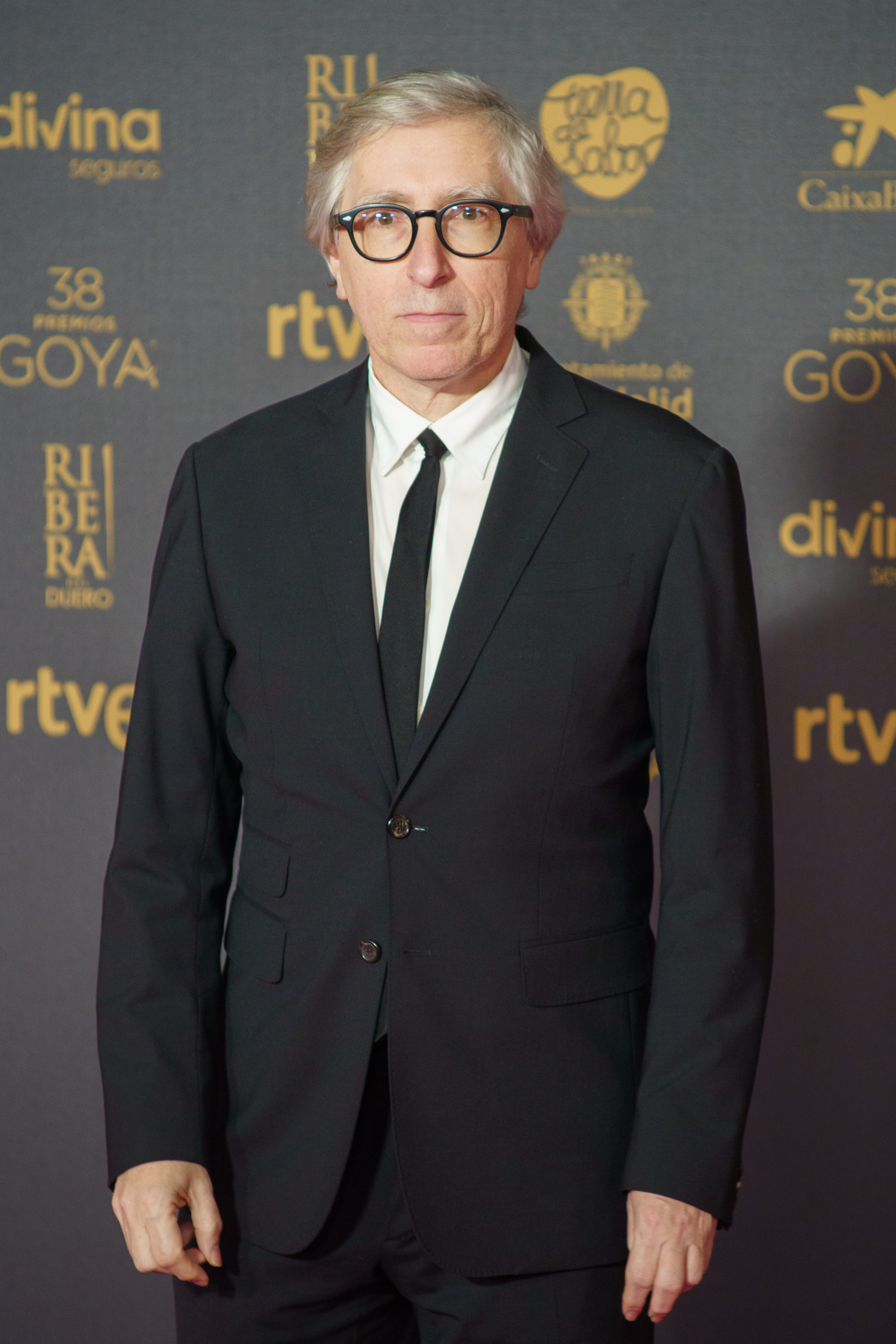
- Trueba in 2024
- Born: David Rodríguez Trueba; 10 September 1969 (age 56); Madrid, Spain
- Occupations: Film director; novelist; screenwriter
- Spouse: Ariadna Gil (m. 1993; div. 2008)
- Children: 2
- Relatives: Fernando Trueba (brother); Jonás Trueba (nephew)

David Rodríguez Trueba (born 10 September 1969) is a Spanish filmmaker and author.

== Biography ==
David Rodríguez Trueba was born on 10 September 1969 in Madrid, the youngest of 8 siblings. His elder brother Fernando is also a filmmaker. In 1987, he joined the Complutense University of Madrid to study journalism. He later took a 1-year course on scriptwriting at the American Film Institute, where he penned the base script of The Worst Years of Our Lives.

He is the ex-husband of actress Ariadna Gil.

He has published the novels Abierto toda la noche, Cuatro amigos and Saber perder in Anagrama.

== Filmography ==
=== Film ===
Year	Title	Director	Writer	Notes
1991	Quiero que sea él	No	Yes	Short film
1992	Amo tu cama rica	No	Yes	
1994	Los peores años de nuestra vida	No	Yes	
1995	Two Much	No	Yes	
1996	The Good Life	Yes	Yes	
1997	Perdita Durango	No	Yes	
1998	La niña de tus ojos	No	Yes	
2000	Vengo	No	Yes	
2000	Obra maestra	Yes	Yes	
2002	Soldados de Salamina	Yes	Yes	Also editor
2006	Bienvenido a casa	Yes	Yes	
2011	Madrid, 1987	Yes	Yes	Also composer
2011	Los muertos no se tocan, nene	No	Yes	
2013	Vivir es fácil con los ojos cerrados	Yes	Yes	
2018	Casi 40	Yes	Yes	
2020	El olvido que seremos	No	Yes	
2020	A este lado del mundo	Yes	Yes	
2023	Saben aquell	Yes	Yes	
2024	El hombre bueno	Yes	Yes	
2025	Siempre es invierno	Yes	Yes	Also based on his novel

=== Documentary ===
Year	Title	Director	Writer	Notes
2003	Balseros	No	Yes	
2004	Cerrar los Ojos	Yes	No	Segment from the episodic political documentary "¡Hay Motivo!!"
2006	La silla de Fernando	Yes	Yes	Co-directed with Luis Alegre; Also editor
2011	Positive Generation: Voces Por Un Futuro Sin Vida	Yes	No	
2013	El Cuadro	Yes	No	
2015	Monólogos de Montaigne por Ramon Fontseré	Yes	No	
2016	Salir de Casa	Yes	No	Also producer
2019	Si Me Borrara El Viento Lo Que Yo Canto	Yes	Yes	

=== Television ===
Year	Title	Director	Writer	Notes
1991	¡Felicidades, Albert!	No	Yes	TV special
1993	El Peor Programa del Mundo	Yes	No	5 episodes
1995	IX Premios Goya	No	Yes	TV special
2007	Rafael Azcona, Oficio de Guionista	Yes	Yes	TV Interview to Rafael Azcona
2009	La Ciudad de las Palabras	Yes	No	
2010	¿Que Fue de Jorge Sanz?	Yes	Yes	TV Mini-Series
2013	Un Lugar Llamado Mundo	Yes	No	TV Documentary Mini-Series
2016	¿Que Fue de Jorge Sanz?: 5 Años Después	Yes	Yes	TV Movie
2017	¿Que Fue de Jorge Sanz? III	Yes	Yes	TV Movie
2022	La Sagrada Familia	Yes	No	TV Mini-series Documentary
2023	Sofia y la vida real	Yes	No	TV Mini-series Documentary; Co-directed with Jordi Ferreons
2024	Un día en Nueva York con Woody Allen	Yes	Yes	TV Interview to Woody Allen

=== Music Videos ===
Director

Year	Title	Artist
1995	El Lado Más Bestia del Mundo	Albert Pla
2004	Suponne Follosa	Albert Pla
2006	Beautiful Señoritas	Top Models
2007	Sé Feliz	Luz Cascal
2009	Fuera de Aquí	Ondrina
2014	Universos Paralelos	Jorge Drexler
2015	'Dança Tribal' (Imagining Miró)	Ignasi Terraza Trio
2015	Not in Love	Maika Makovski
2020	A Este Lado del Mundo	Ondina

== Bibliography ==
=== Fiction ===
- Abierto Toda La Noche (1995)
- Artículos de Ocasión (1998)
- Cuatro Amigos (1999)
- Saber Perder (2008)
- Blitz (2014) - 2016 English translation by John Cullen
- Tierra de Campos (2017)
- El Río Baja Sucio (2019)
- Queridos Niños (2021)

=== Articles ===
- Artículos de Ocasión (1998)
- Tragarse la Lengua y Otro Artículos de Ocasión(2003)
- Érase una Vez(2013)
- La Tiranía Sin Titanos (2018)
- El Siglo XIX Cumple 18 (2018)
- Ganarse la Vida (2020)

=== Political books ===
==== "Biblioteca de Ideas Insensatas" ====
- Para salvar de una vez por todas la monarquía (2015)
- Para salvar de una vez por todas la democracia (2015)

== Awards and nominations ==
Year	Work	Award	Category	Result	Ref
1995	Los peores años de nuestra vida	Goya Awards	Best Original Screenplay	Nominated	
1997	The Good Life	Karlovy Vary International Film Festival	Special Jury Prize	Won	
1997	The Good Life	Goya Awards	Best Original Screenplay	Nominated	
1997	The Good Life	Goya Awards	Best New Director	Nominated	
1999	La niña de tus ojos	Goya Awards	Best Original Screenplay	Nominated	
2003	Soldados de Salamina	Cannes Film Festival	Un Certain Regard	Nominated	
2004	Soldados de Salamina	CEC Awards	Best Director	Nominated	
2004	Soldados de Salamina	CEC Awards	Best Adapted Screenplay	Nominated	
2004	Soldados de Salamina	CEC Awards	Best Editing	Won	
2004	Soldados de Salamina	18th Goya Awards	Best Director	Nominated	
2004	Soldados de Salamina	18th Goya Awards	Best Adapted Screenplay	Nominated	
2005	Hay motivo	Goya Awards	Best Documentary	Nominated	
2006	Bienvenido a Casa	Málaga Film Festival	Golden Biznaga	Nominated	
2006	Bienvenido a Casa	Málaga Film Festival	Best Director	Won	
2007	Bienvenido a Casa	Goya Awards	Best Original Song ("Duermen los niños")	Nominated	
2007	La silla de Fernando	Goya Awards	Best Documentary	Nominated	
2008	Saber perder	Premio de la Crítica Española	Narrativa Castellana	Won	
2012	Madrid, 1987	2012 Sundance Film Festival	World Cinema Jury Prize: Dramatic	Nominated	
2012	Los muertos no se tocan, nene	CEC Medals	Best Adapted Screenplay	Nominated	
2013	Living Is Easy with Eyes Closed	San Sebastián International Film Festival	Golden Shell	Nominated	
2014	Living Is Easy with Eyes Closed	Feroz Awards	Best Director	Won	
2014	Living Is Easy with Eyes Closed	Feroz Awards	Best Screenplay	Won	
2014	Living Is Easy with Eyes Closed	Goya Awards	Best Director	Won	
2014	Living Is Easy with Eyes Closed	Goya Awards	Best Original Screenplay	Won	
2014	Living Is Easy with Eyes Closed	CEC Awards	Best Director	Won	
2014	Living Is Easy with Eyes Closed	CEC Awards	Best Original Screenplay	Won	
2014	Living Is Easy with Eyes Closed	Platino Awards	Best Director	Nominated	
2014	Living Is Easy with Eyes Closed	Platino Awards	Best Screenplay	Nominated	
2017	¿Qué fue de Jorge Sanz? 5 años despues	Forqué Awards	Best Comedy	Nominated	
2018	Tierra de Campos	Premio de la Crítica de Madrid	Narrative	Won	
2018	Tierra de Campos	Los Libreros Recomiendan	Fiction	Won	
2018	Almost 40	Málaga Film Festival	Golden Biznaga	Nominated	
2018	Almost 40	Málaga Film Festival	Special Jury Prize	Won	
2020	A este lado del mundo	Málaga Film Festival	Golden Biznaga	Nominated	
2021	Forgotten We'll Be	Platino Awards	Best Screenplay	Won	
2024	Saben aquell	Gaudí Awards	Best Director	Nominated	
2024	Saben aquell	Gaudí Awards	Best Adapted Screenplay	Nominated	
2024	Saben aquell	CEC Medals	Best Adapted Screenplay	Nominated	
2024	Saben aquell	Goya Awards	Best Director	Nominated	
2024	Saben aquell	Goya Awards	Best Adapted Screenplay	Nominated	
2024	El hombre bueno	Málaga Film Festival	Golden Biznaga	Nominated	
