= Martirio =

Spanish singer (b.1954)

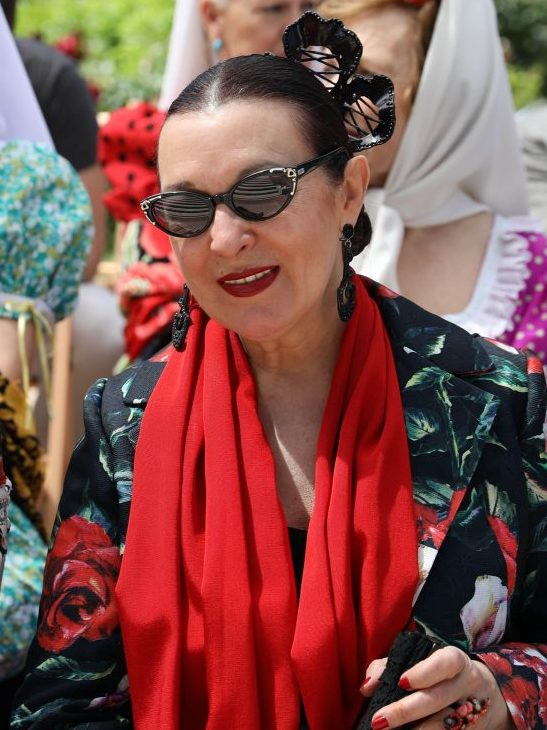
Martirio in 2017.

Maribel Quiñones or María Isabel de la Cinta Quiñones Gutiérrez in full, known under her stage name as Martirio (a Spanish given name meaning Martyrdom or Torment, in English) is a Spanish singer born in 1954 in Huelva, Spain.

== Biography ==
She borrows her style and inspiration from flamenco that she adapts or merge with more modern musical trends, especially jazz and tango but also pop, rock, swing, and guaracha, in this sense, she can properly be ranked as a New Flamenco artist.

She is also noted for a distinctive look (wearing large sunglasses).

Martirio participated in the delivery of the poetry prize to Paloma Chen at the Royal Spanish Academy on March 15, 2021, singing a cappella.

== Awards and achievements ==
In 2019 Martirio was awarded the Gold Medal of Merit in the Fine Arts together with the singer Patti Smith.

== Discography ==
- 1986 Estoy Mala (Nuevo)
- 2003 La Bola de LA Vida del Amor (Karonte)
- 2003 Mucho Corazon (Sunnyside)
- 2003 Flor de Piel (Sunnyside)
- 2004 Martirio (Nuevos Medios)
- 2004 He Visto Color Por Sevillanas (BMG International)
- 2005 Acoplados (RTVE Classics)
- 2006 Primavera en Nueva York (Norte)
- 2010 Total (Reyes)
- 2011 Aire Que Te Rodea (Sony Music)
- 2012 Cristalitos Machacaos (Nuevos Medios)
- 2013 De un Mundo Raro (Cantes por Chavela)
