= Argentine LGBTQ cinema =

Argentina has a strong body of national LGBT cinema. It is also home to the international LGBT film festival Libercine. Some LGBT films from the country have been said to "have created an impact thanks to positive critical reception, and their queer protagonists", with the nation itself in recent years said to have "taken the lead in Latin America in producing provocative films that shed the cliches of so much commercial gay filmmaking in the United States". Deborah Shaw theorises that new forms of co-production and different avenues of funding may be promoting more queer film in Argentina.

== Analysis ==
=== Homosexuality as social commentary ===
Rosalind Galt proposes that though new queer Argentine cinema and New Argentine Cinema (NAC) occupy the same time period, they may be distinct; that queer cinema is excluded from the discussion of NAC and "crisis cinema". Galt argues that "queer textuality provides a radical mode of articulating economic refusal", that the extra queer narrative is further subversive against crisis in ways not occupied by NAC, precipitated by creative and cultural differences between queer cinema and other modes of filmmaking.

In his 2016 article, Guillermo Abel Severiche also positions queer Argentine cinema as "[conceptualizing] desire as a means to defy a discourse of power", referring to Plan B when he asserts that "the construction of a (homo)erotic sexual tension questions the validity of sexual categories and/or their very existence", breaking a fixed cultural construct. One way in which this is achieved is the presentation of how the protagonists discover their sexuality, without self-imposing heterosexuality onto themselves or each other.

The idea of critiquing society by empowering characters through queer narratives had been mentioned by Lucía Brackes of Los Andes in 2012, in discussion of the much older 1969 Fuego. Brackes reflects that "Coca is such a whore that she becomes a lesbian, a revolutionary and almost militant idea about the oppressed condition of women."

=== "Berger shot" ===
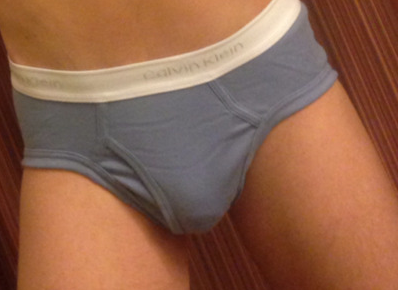
The "Berger shot" drives the view to men's crotches

"Some gay directors today focus on the obvious, like muscle or party boys or on women like Almodóvar. No one films the male body the way Jarman did or Fassbinder did, like it's art: faces, butts, dicks or just the beard shot very carefully. If I see a man in a cafe and I look at his arm and maybe it's very blonde and very hairy. I could spend a half an hour looking at his arm or even smelling him." — Marco Berger

Severiche also writes that director Marco Berger uses cinematographic techniques that result in "a (homo)erotization of the cinematographic image that intends to break the consolidation of heteronormative conceptions of sexuality"; these techniques include what he refers to as the "Berger shot" — "shots that depict a young man's crotch". He notes that the "Berger shot" is an example and an anti-example of the Male Gaze, and can be included in the "queer gaze".

Mark James writes that "Berger's distinctive style [is] both tensely sexual but also sensual and romantic" in how the camera is often "lingering on the parts of gay imagination and sensuality that all gay boys grow up trying to process — the sight of a man's arms, hands, legs, hair… handsome faces and the male body"; the sexuality but also the innocence means that though imagery of the body is not uncommon in film, "Berger works it at a wholly different level", as he intentionally avoids using stereotypical gay imagery in his shots.

The Fujoshi film reviewers look at the 2016 film Taekwondo, which Berger co-directed, identifying how it shows male physicality with "a lot of physical contact and the bodies (and private parts) detail shots" (sic); the "extraordinary masculinity" is still captured despite its slow and emotional tone.

== Films ==
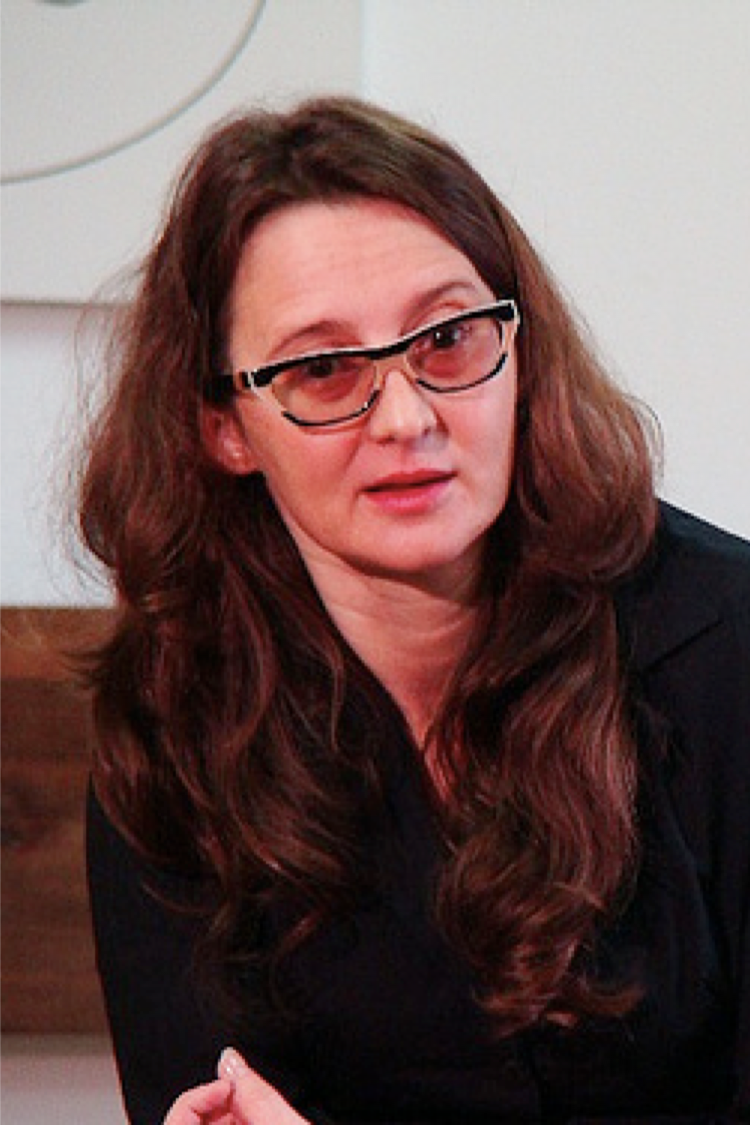
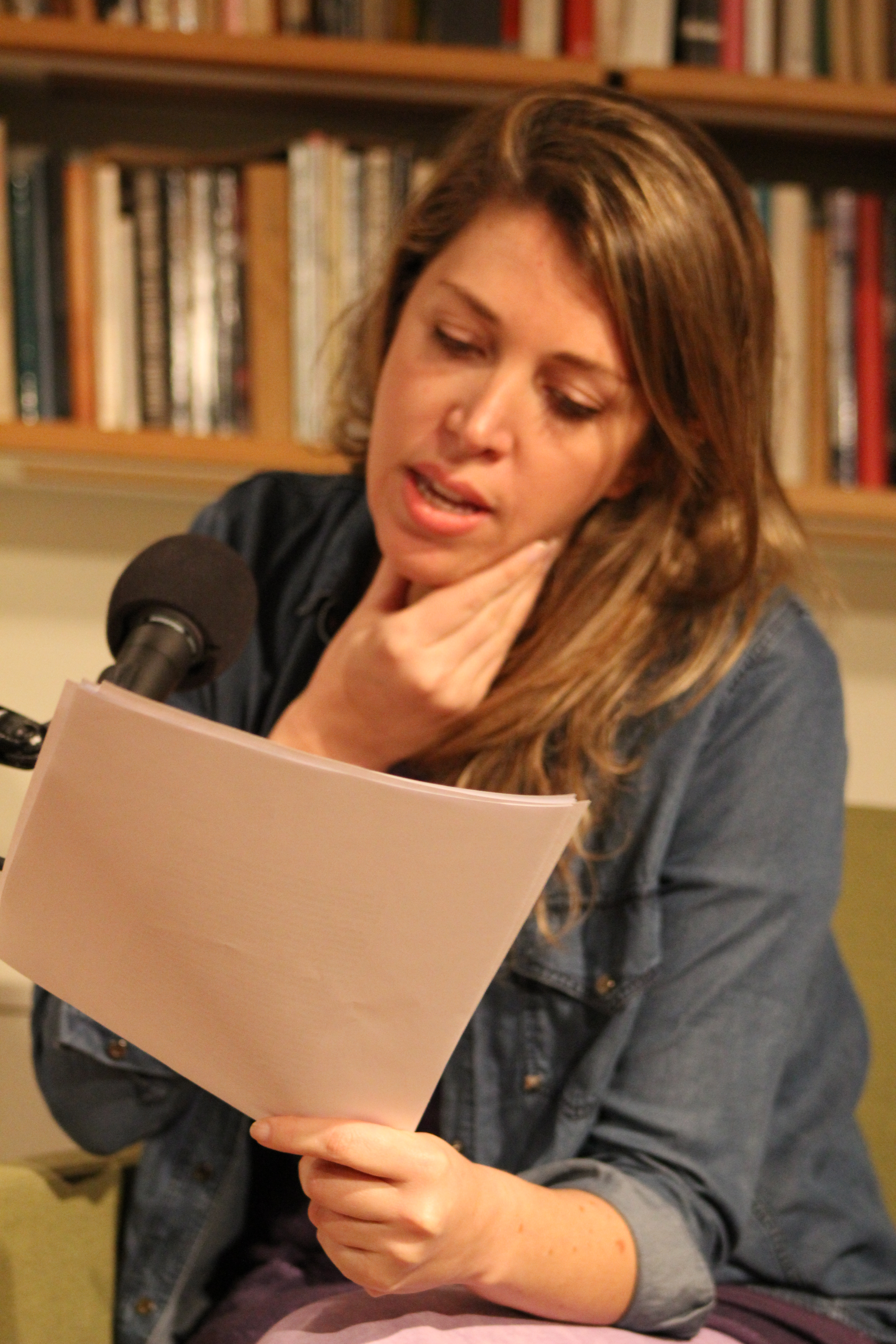
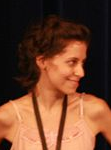
Argentine directors Lucrecia Martel (L)
and Lucía Puenzo (R). Both have
created multiple LGBT+ films. Actress
Inés Efron (below) has starred in many.
Deborah Shaw believes that "Martel,
[Claudia] Llosa, and Puenzo's arrival
onto the international stage at the
beginning of 21st century marked the
beginning of an extraordinary moment
in the history of Latin American
cinema".

Though not produced in Argentina, Wong Kar-wai's famous Happy Together is largely set in the country.

The Argentine films La León (2007), Absent (2011) and Brief Story from the Green Planet (2019) won the Teddy for best LGBTQ+ feature at the Berlin Film Festival.

Year	Film title	Director	Notes
1969	Fuego	Armando Bó	first representation of lesbianism in Argentine film history
1975	Mi novia el...	Enrique Cahen Salaberry	based on Victor and Victoria
1984	Atrapadas	Aníbal Di Salvo	based on a true story
1986	Otra historia de amor	Americo Ortiz de Zarate	
2000	Apariencias	Alberto Lecchi	based on a true story
2001	Burnt Money	Marcelo Piñeyro	based on a true story
2001	La Ciénaga	Lucrecia Martel	Salta trilogy; based on three true stories
2002	Tan de repente	Diego Lerman	based on a true story
2003	Carandiru	Héctor Babenco	based on Estação Carandiru
2004	The Holy Girl	Lucrecia Martel	Salta trilogy; based on three true stories
2005	A Year Without Love	Anahí Berneri	
2006	Glue	Alexis Dos Santos	based on a true story
2007	La León	Santiago Otheguy	based on a true story
2007	XXY	Lucía Puenzo	based on a true story
2008	The Headless Woman	Lucrecia Martel	Salta trilogy; based on three true stories
2009	The Fish Child	Lucía Puenzo	based on a true story
2009	The Last Summer of La Boyita	Julia Solomonoff	
2009	Plan B	Marco Berger	based on a true story
2011	Absent (Ausente)	Marco Berger	based on a true story
2011	Olympia	Leo Damario	based on a true story
2011	Widows	Marcos Carnevale	based on a true story
2012	My Last Round	Julio Jorquera	based on a true story
2013	Hawaii	Marco Berger	based on a true story
2014	Death in Buenos Aires	Natalia Meta	based on a true story
2014	The Guest (La Visita)	Mauricio López Fernández	based on a true story
2015	Butterfly	Marco Berger	based on a true story
2015	Rara	Pepa San Martín	based on a true story
2016	Esteros	Papu Curotto	based on a true story
2016	Taekwondo	Marco Berger	based on a true story
2017	The Heavy Hand of the Law	Fernán Mirás	based on a true story
2017	Nadie nos mira	Julia Solomonoff	International production, including Argentina's. Main actors are Argentines Guillermo Pfening and Elena Roger.
2018	El Ángel	Luis Ortega	based on a true story
2018	Las hijas del fuego	Albertina Carri	
2018	Marilyn	Martín Rodríguez Redondo	based on a true story
2018	My Best Friend	Martín Deus	based on a true story
2019	Un Rubio (The Blonde One)	Marco Berger	based on a true story
2019	Brief Story from the Green Planet (Breve historia del planeta verde)	Santiago Loza	based on a true story
2019	End of the Century (Fin de siglo)	Lucio Castro	based on a true story
2020	El cazador (The Young Hunter)	Marco Berger	
2023	León	Andi Nachon, Papu Curotto	
2024	Underground Orange	Michael Taylor Jackson	
