= Latin American LGBTQ cinema =

Latin American nations have been producing national LGBTQ cinema since at least the 1980s, though homosexual characters have been appearing in their films since at least 1923.^{:75} The collection of LGBTQ-themed films from 2000 onwards has been dubbed New Maricón Cinema by Vinodh Venkatesh; the term both includes Latine culture and identity and does not exclude non-queer LGBTQ films like Azul y no tan rosa.^{:6-7} Latin American cinema is largely non-systemic, which is established as a reason for its wide variety of LGBT-themed films.^{:142}

A "boom" in LGBTQ cinema of the region began at the turn of the century and was reinvigorated in the 2010s, which also notably included output of such films from spaces in Latin America (e.g. Venezuela) with film industries that "have lagged behind" the rest of the region.^{:6-7, 19, 192}

The bisexual-themed Mexican film Y tu mamá también (2001) was nominated for an Oscar, with the Chilean trans+ film A Fantastic Woman (2017) winning one. Azul y no tan rosa (2012) won the Goya Award for Best Spanish Language Foreign Film at the 28th Goya Awards, becoming the first Venezuelan film to do so.

== History ==
Before LGBTQ cinema was produced in Latin America, there were still such themes in films of the region; a notable director of this period was Arturo Ripstein. B. Ruby Rich clarifies that, in these earlier films, the queer elements were used symbolically and tailored for an arthouse and international audience, a form of intelligent cinema. They became popular in queer communities nationally, though.^{:143} Rich also believes that they likely inspired the later LGBTQ cinema, which took influence from them because "the most interesting narratives and characters were often gay and lesbian".^{:142}

Rich describes the popularity of LGBT-themed cinema in Latin America to have emerged from various Latin American nations' similar political histories. A culture of independent filmmaking arose during unfavourable political or military-political situations limiting popular freedom in the late 20th century; this same culture remained even after political stability was achieved from the 1980s — with stability the filmmakers could tackle different themes that critiqued society and the government, including telling LGBTQ narratives.^{:142}

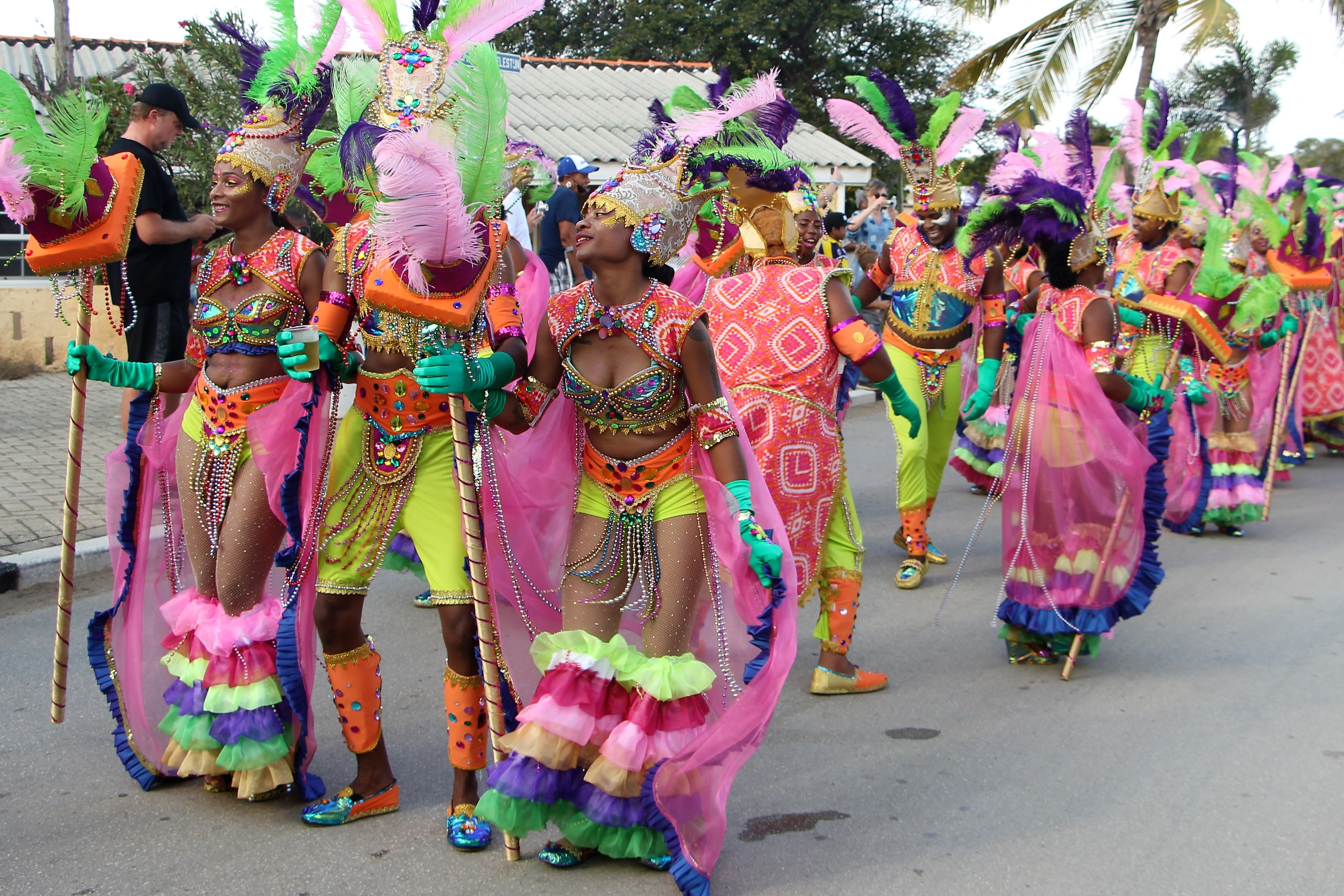
Carnaval in Bonaire; the colourful and performative Latin American carnivals are theorised to have informed film

From the 1990s, internal reinvigoration and growing interest in its cinema from people in the West, allowed for the emergence of more diverse filmmaking in Latin America. Rich notes that the independent-esque industry of Latin American cinema, including its large contributions to New Queer Cinema, is appreciably different to the system of the United States — allowing for such greater creativity in queer film.^{:142} She also proposes that there is influence from the flamboyant and performative burlesque, cabaret, and carnival aspects of many Latin American cultures, often included under the same umbrella as their filmmaking, which "communicates an unapologetic energy that can be claimed as queer".^{:168}

The Mexican performance artiste Ximena Cuevas, whose works often feature themes of lesbianism, has been called "a perfect prototype for an emergent Queer New Latin American Cinema". Some of her notable works are from 2001,^{:172} the same year as Y tu mamá también was released across the Americas, a trigger moment for LGBTQ themes to be incorporated in more of the region's productions that would be mainstream.^{:176-177}

In 2012, Gustavo Subero wrote that "Although it is undeniable that there have been a dramatic increase in the body of lesbi-gay themed films made in the region", they do not normalize or liberate queerness and queer characters. He theorizes that cinematic queerness and the reality of sex and sexuality are kept separate.^{:214-215}

== Conventions of Latin American LGBTQ cinema ==
=== Bed-sharing ===
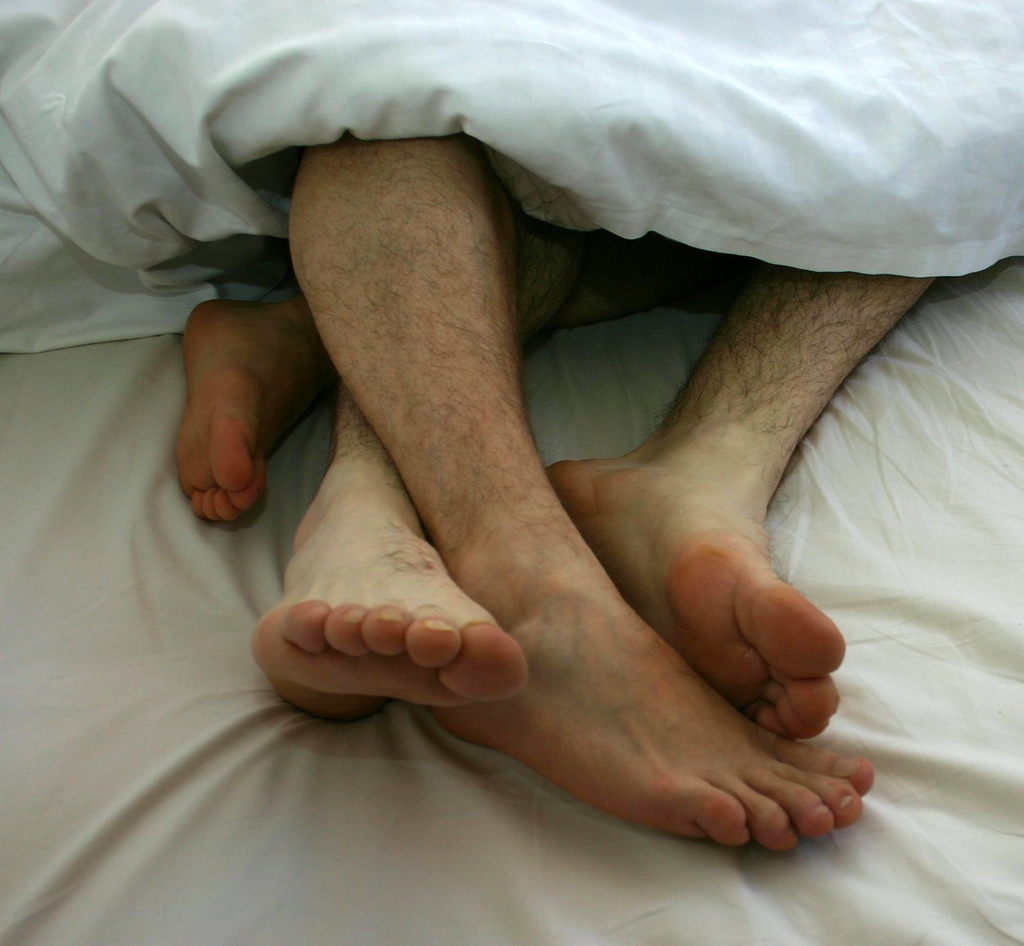
Two men's feet tangled under bedcovers

Within conventions of Latin American cinema there is a normative ideal that it is acceptable for women to sleep in the same bed together, with such situations not automatically placing a movie within the realm of queer cinema, but not for men; two men sharing a bed in Latin American cinema, even if those men are young, is often used as an indication of queer acts that are not explicitly shown. Related to the machismo present both in society and culture, Gustavo Subero suggests that bed-sharing for men is used as a stand-in when male homosexuality will not be physically expressed in order to not "challenge the rigid sexual system operating in Latin America".^{:213}

=== Black-and-white ===
Several works of Latin American LGBTQ cinema are rendered as stylistically black-and-white. These include Tan de repente (2002), where the choice is said to give the film a charming innocence that promotes its narrative, and A Thousand Clouds of Peace (2003), where it furthers the experimental intentions both in standing out and affronting expectations.^{:178}

=== "Haptic" sound ===
Venkatesh notes that "strongly haptic sounds [...] are common" in the genre; this is typically loud sound that feels distant and reaching out to the listener, including examples such as waves crashing on a shore in the background of a scene far from any coastline. The sound will have amplified bass and treble, and may be overlaid in scenes symbolically, especially if the scene is also intended to be distant but associated with longing.^{:183-184}

=== Machismo and transgender narratives ===
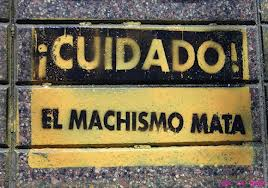
Protest sign saying "Caution: Machismo kills"

Gustavo Subero pursued research on queer representations in Latin American cinema. He has argued several points through cultural lenses, focusing largely on the machismo culture of many parts of Latin America. Subero suggests that queer individuals' contradiction of the heterosexual norm significantly impacts these ideals within the Latin American culture, where men are expected to be strong and dominant, and that the strongly male-dominated culture is afraid of a male that contradicts the traditional ideal; this has led to a lack of exposure for the transgender male even within Latin American queer cinema.

Bernard Schulz Cruz, who focused on Mexican Gay Cinema, suggested that even when Latino transgender men have appeared in queer cinema (like in Arturo Ripstein's 1978 El Lugar sin limites), it is rarely in a positive light, suggesting that in queer Latin American cinema, the body is a tool that is used in order to attain satisfaction above all other things.

=== Sex comedy characters ===
Fichera is a genre of Mexican film predominant in the 1970s and early 1980s that commonly featured homosexual characters. They derive from an earlier genre of nightclub films that would usually feature a queen performing. Lewis describes the gay characters in the genre as fitting the "in-between" type of Richard Dyer's categories.^{:75} In this early market, LGBTQ themes were only shown in Mexican films through minor characters of gender deviance, fulfilled in this genre; Lewis noted that though less-studied and not explicitly named by Lewis, Brazilian cinema showed the same phenomenon.^{:76} Also based on Italian sex comedy, this is the Pornochanchada genre.^{:269}

=== Symbolism and voice of children ===
Venkatesh writes in chapter 9 of his book on New Maricón Cinema about films within and surrounding the genre that show a convention of using child characters to represent a neoliberal future.^{:175-177} Diverging from the arguments of Ignacio Sánchez Prado, Venkatesh notes that child and youth characters in many films of the new era can become exposed to or involved in LGBTQ surroundings and situations without also experiencing a coming-of-age. Whilst acknowledging young characters realizing their sexuality in many of these films, Venkatesh highlights that several also feature young characters that provide a reflection of non-normative adult sexuality and/or a narrative on it, and may act as mediation between normative and non-normative realms.^{:177} These include characters like Pedro in Lokas (Chile, 2008), where he is given the power to accept his father's homosexuality or not as a symbol of the society in his father's future, suggesting that how children respond to the LGBTQ themes reveals the narrative's ultimate outlook,^{:183} and Hendrix in La otra familia (Mexico, 2011), who has a similar choice regarding prospective adoptive parents (a gay couple) and allowing queerness to be introduced into national identity.^{:188-190} Venkatesh also proposes that in films with such characters, the viewer largely sees the film through the child's eyes.^{:183-189} This also serves to allow the audience to be willing students to messages the films deliver, some with an "explicit agenda to educate".^{:190}

== In society ==
The British Film Institute compares the typically religious and machismo cultures of many Latin American countries with their "extraordinary" ranges of queer films; their 2019 Flare festival selected seven Latin American features.

Outrage against the high ratings given Y Tu Mamá También both in Mexico and the United States ultimately led to the Mexican ratings board (RTC) being made a separate body autonomous from the government.

The release and popularity of the Chilean film A Fantastic Woman, about a trans woman, helped the country pass its Gender Identity Law in 2018.

== List of films by identity ==
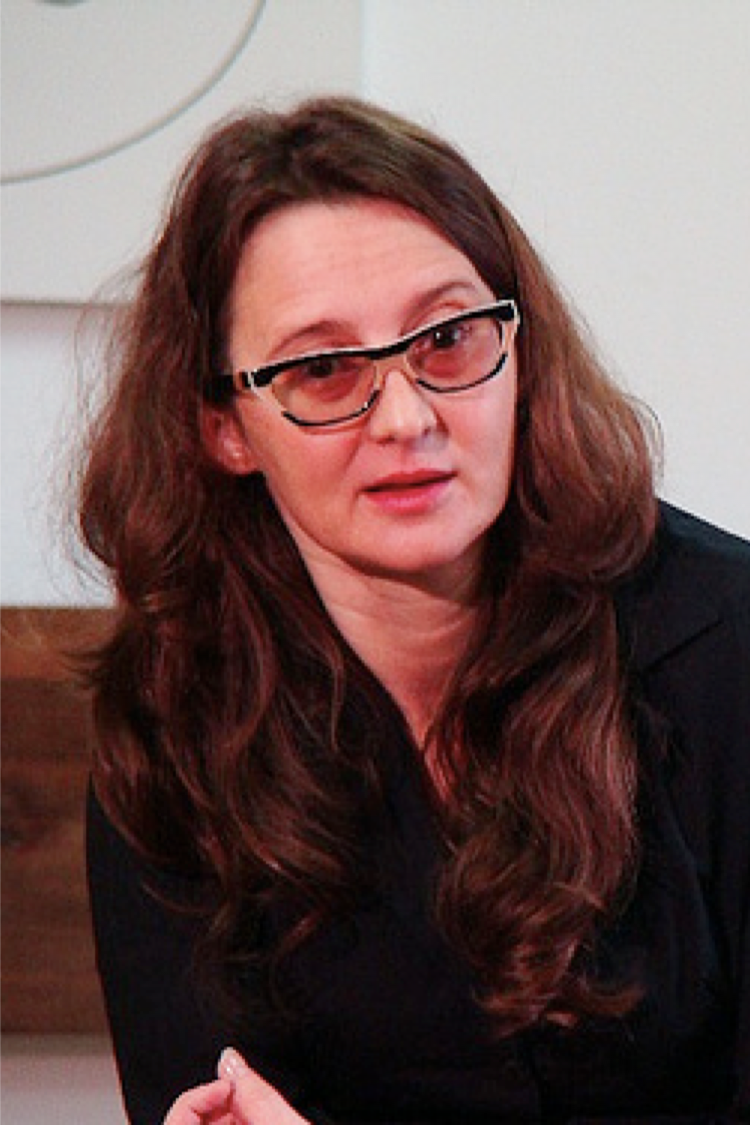
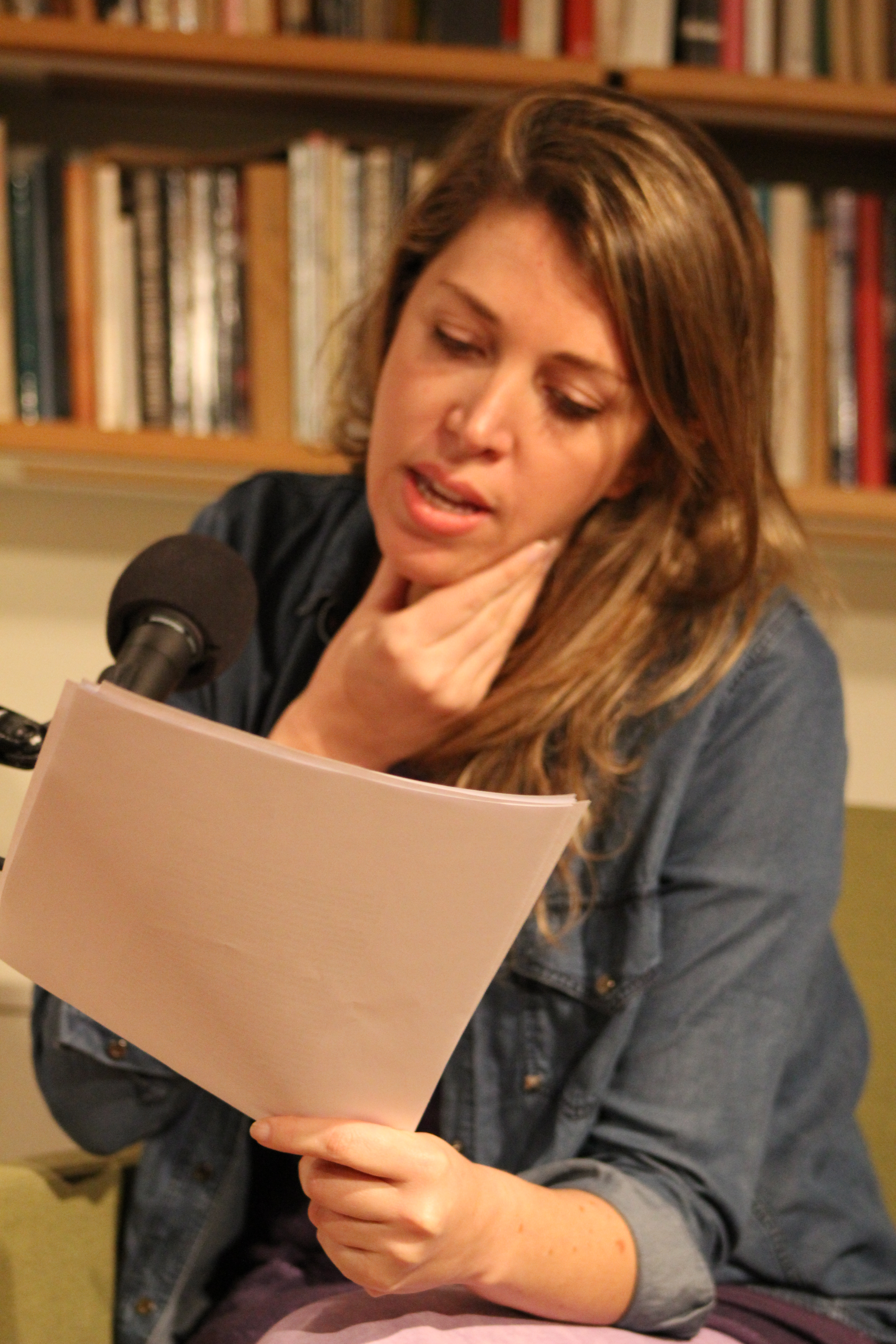
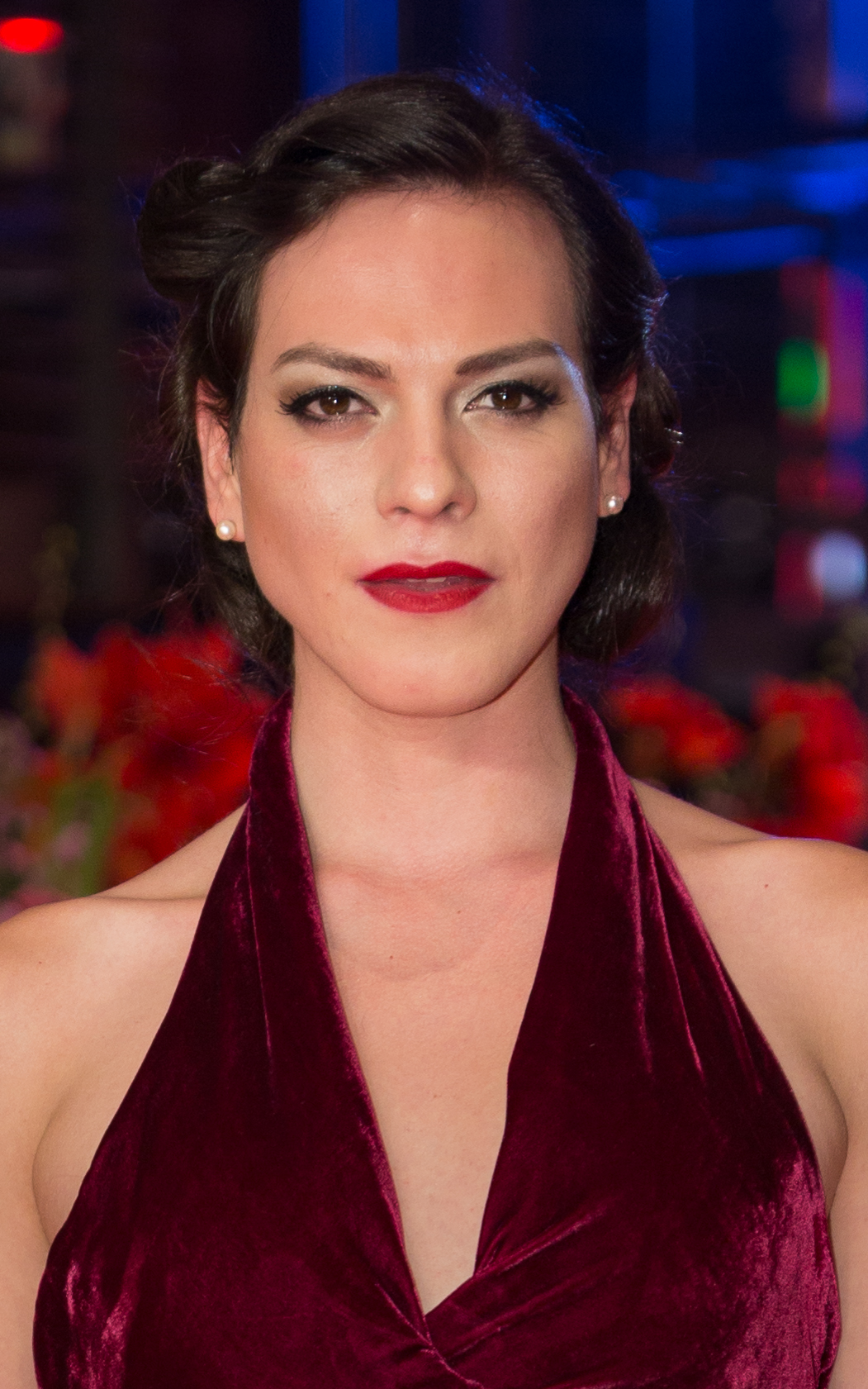
Top: Argentine directors Lucrecia Martel (L)
and Lucía Puenzo (R). Both have created
multiple LGBTQ films, several starring
Argentine actress Inés Efron;
Bottom: Chilean transgender actress
Daniela Vega has won seven Best Actress
awards for her performance in LGBTQ films

=== Bisexual cinema ===
- Y tu mamá también (2001) Two friends, with homoerotic history, have an unexpected sexual encounter whilst pursuing the same woman, leading them to part ways.
- Glue (2006) Two teenage friends in a punk band meet a girl, with the three exploring drugs and sex together.
- Plan B (2009) After being dumped for another man, Bruno seeks revenge on his ex-girlfriend by attempting to seduce her new boyfriend away from her.

=== Gay cinema ===
- Plata quemada (2001) The true story of an infamous 1965 bank robbery from the perspective of two thieves in a gay relationship.
- Carandiru (2003) Based on a real story; at a Brazilian prison, inmates prove to be HIV-positive in events that led up to a massacre.
- Un año sin amor (2005) The plot follows Pablo, a writer dealing with loneliness and AIDS. Yearning for love, he places ads in a gay magazine and finds himself involved in the secretive world of Buenos Aires gay leather scene.
- La León (2007) A gay outsider in a rural village begins a relationship with the local bully.
- La Mission (2009) Che Rivera (Benjamin Bratt) is a newly released prisoner. He has grown up living in the Mission District being a tough guy by embracing his masculinity. Being a recovering alcoholic, he tries to maintain his role model status within the barrio where everyone knows him and for his son Jesse "Jes" Rivera (Jeremy Ray Valdez), who he has raised by himself since the death of his wife. Che thought that he brought up his son right by encouraging him to be a better person than Che. However, dynamics change when he finds out that his son is gay. He does not accept it and ends up kicking Jes out of the house. For Che, being gay is losing your machismo within the community and you are viewed as weak. But if he wants to be a part of his son's life, he has to engage into an emotional side of himself that he is not familiar with.
- Leo's Room (2009) A young Uruguayan man has several encounters as he discovers his sexual identity.^{:195}
- Ausente (2011) A student forcefully tries to act on homosexual desires for his teacher.
- Hawaii (2013) Two young men from different social backgrounds come to terms with their growing attraction for each other in rural Argentina.
- El tercero (2014) After meeting online, three gay men - a college student and an older couple - share dinner, thoughs, and possibly start a ménage à trois.
- Retablo (2018) A young boy questions his father's craft, now his own as a devoted apprentice, when he finds out his father is gay.
- Tu me manques (2019) After the death of his son, Gabriel, conservative Bolivian Jorge travels to New York to visit Gabriel's boyfriend, Sebastian, and learn more about his life. Sebastian channels his grief into a play.

=== Intersex cinema ===
- Both (2005) Peruvian-American film about an adult woman, bisexual and masculine in appearance, discovering her intersex castration through clues from a reclusive relative.
- XXY (2007) Written and directed by Lucía Puenzo, starring Inés Efron as Alex, an intersex person. Also contains homosexual themes through the character of Álvaro.
- Being Impossible (2018) Venezuelan-Colombian film that explores societal implications of intersex and expectations of gendered roles.

=== Lesbian cinema ===
- Tan de repente (2002) A young salesgirl is kidnapped by older lesbians.
- The Fish Child (2009) A well-off girl and her maid commit a series of crimes to ensure they can stay together.
- Mosquita y Mari (2012) Directed by Aurora Guerrero. Synopsis: In a fast-paced immigrant community where dreams are often lost to economic survival, two young Chicanas contemplate life when they stir unexpected desires in each other.
- The Firefly (2015) After a young man's death on his wedding day, his grieving sister and bride hide from society and lean on each other for support, falling into a relationship. Though both main characters are shown as bisexual, the film focuses on their lesbian relationship.

=== Trans+ cinema ===
- A Fantastic Woman (2017) This film follows the character Marina, played by Daniela Vega, a trans woman, after the death of her lover Orlando. She faces discrimination, harassment, and harsh treatment, particularly from authorities and Orlando's family members. The film won the Academy Award for Best Foreign Language Film at the 90th Academy Awards.
- Brief Story from the Green Planet (2019) A science fiction film that follows a young transgender woman after the death of her grandmother.
- Todos cambiamos (2019) A perfect Panamanian family falls apart when the cross-dressing father chooses to pursue gender reassignment surgery.
