= Ausente =

Ausente, Spanish for absent, may refer to:

== Film and television ==
- La Ausente, original Spanish title of the 1951 Mexican drama film The Absentee directed by Julio Bracho
- El Ausente, a 1989 Argentine film directed and written by Rafael Filipelli
- Ausentes (film), a 2005 Spanish film by director Daniel Calparsoro
- Ausente, a 2008 Chilean film directed by Nicolás Acuña
- Ausente (film), a 2011 film by Argentinean director Marco Berger

== Other ==
- Ausente (river), a tributary of the Liris close to where it flows into the Tyrrhenian Sea
- José Antonio Primo de Rivera, Spanish political figure known as El Ausente

== See also ==
- Absence (disambiguation)
