= Ailín Salas =

Argentine actress (born 1993)

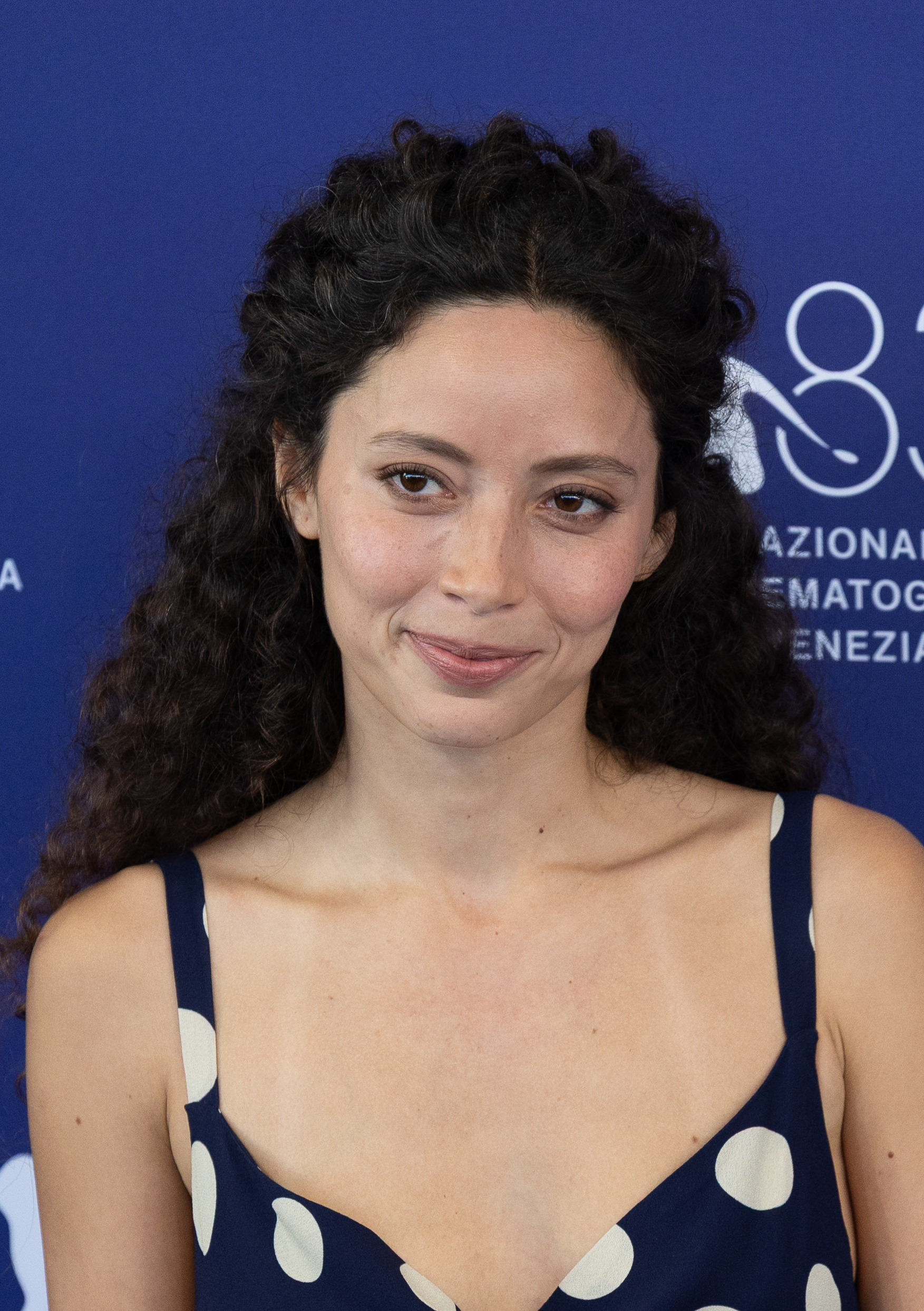
- Salas in 2026
- Born: July 14, 1993 (age 33); Aracaju, Sergipe, Brazil
- Occupation: Actress
- Years active: 2007–present
- Partner: Luis Ortega (2011–2014)

Ailín Salas (born July 14, 1993) is an Argentine actress.

== Filmography ==
=== Film ===
Year	Movie	Character	Notes
2007	XXY	Roberta	
2007	El tesoro del portugués	Camila	
2008	La sangre brota	Vanesa	
2009	The Fish Child	Ailín Guayi (girl)	
2010	The Invisible Eye	Inés	
2010	La mosca en la ceniza	Francisca/Denise	
2010	Malasangre	Desaparecida	Short film
2011	Dulce de leche	Ana	
2011	La vida nueva	Sol	
2011	Otros silencios	Lila	
2012	Back to Stay	Violeta Tauss	
2012	La araña vampiro	Camila	
2012	Dromómanos	Brasil	
2013	Vidrios		
2013	Ludmila en Cuba	Ludmila Vieytes	Short film
2013	Algunas chicas	Paula	
2014	Al Desentendido		
2014	La vida de alguien	Luciana	
2015	Onyx	Anahí	
2015	Butterfly	Romina	
2015	Eva Doesn't Sleep	Juana	
2015	Resplandecientes		Short film
2016	The Black Frost	Alejandra	
2016	Lulú	Ludmina Vieytes	
2016	Hija única	Julia/Delfina	
2017	La sierva	Sierva	Short film
2018	Con este miedo al futuro	Jazmín	
2018	The Broken Ones	Ailn	Short film
2019	Boni Bonita	Beatriz	
2019	Un rubio		
2019	El diablo blanco	Anahí	
2020	Noch ein bewölkter Tag	New Tenant	Short film
2020	Bahía Blanca	Catalina	
2021	Solas	Rocío	Short film
2022	El espejo de los malditos	Clelía	
2024	The Astronaut Lovers	Lula	
2026	Wild Horse Nine	Alicia	

=== Television ===
Year	Title	Character	Notes
2011	Televisión x la inclusión	Lucía	"Episodes 3 and 4: La violinista"
2012	En terapia	Clara Salinas	
2012-2015	Presentes	Mariana Ojeda	
2012	Daños colaterales	Rosario Irrazábal	
2012	Amores de historia	Lina	"Episode 5: David y Lina"
2014	Doce casas, Historia de mujeres devotas	Josefina	"Episode 7: Historia de Andrea"
2014	La celebración	Andrea	"Episode 7: Madre"
2019	Clorofilia	Herself	
2019	Broder	Roma	
2019–2021	El Tigre Verón	Estefanía Miranda	

== Awards and nominations ==
Year	Award	Category	Work	Result	Ref.
2013	Martín Fierro Awards	Revelation Artist	En terapia	Nominated	

== External access ==
- Ailin Salas at Cinenacional.com (in Spanish).
- Ailín Salas at IMDb
