= Absence =

Absence may refer to:

== Employment ==
- Leave of absence, a period of time away from a job
- Absenteeism, the habitual pattern of absence from work or duty
- Absence rate, the ratio of workers with absences to total employees

== Sciences and philosophy ==
- The (local) nonexistence of something
- Absence of evidence, a concept in informal logic
- Absence seizure, one of several kinds of seizures

== Arts and entertainment ==
=== Music ===
- The Absence (band), an American death metal band from Tampa, Florida
- Absence (Dälek album), 2004
- Absence (Paper Route album), 2009
- The Absence (Luna Mortis album), 2009
- Absence (Snowman album), 2011
- The Absence (Melody Gardot album), 2012
- Absence (Terence Blanchard album), 2021

=== Other media ===
- Absent (1928 film), a silent film
- The Absence (1976 film), a Canadian drama film
- The Absence (1992 film), a French-German-Spanish drama film
- Absence (audio drama), a 2009 audio drama by Big Finish Productions
- Absent (2011 film), a Spanish-language drama film
- Absences (film), a 2013 Canadian documentary film directed by Carole Laganière
- Absence (film), a 2014 Brazilian film
- Absence (2025 novel), a 2025 novel by Issa Quincy
- Absence (Una Nemo), a Batman villain

== See also ==
- Nothing
