= Otheguy =

Otheguy is a surname. Notable people with the surname include:

- Filipe Otheguy (born 1991), French-born Brazilian basque pelota player
- Santiago Otheguy (born 1973), Argentine film director
