= Young Hunter =

2020 Argentine drama film

- Theatrical film poster
- Directed by: Marco Berger
- Release date: 23 January 2020 (IFFR)
- Running time: 101 minutes
- Country: Argentina
- Language: Spanish

Young Hunter (Spanish: El cazador) is a 2020 Argentine drama film directed by Marco Berger.

== Plot ==
Ezequiel tries to affirm his gay identity with an older boy he meets in a square, and the film gradually evolves into an increasingly passionate youthful romance, only to unveil the criminal plot later.

== Cast ==
- Juan Pablo Cestaro - Ezequiel
- Lautaro Rodríguez - Mono
