= Cinema of Catalonia =

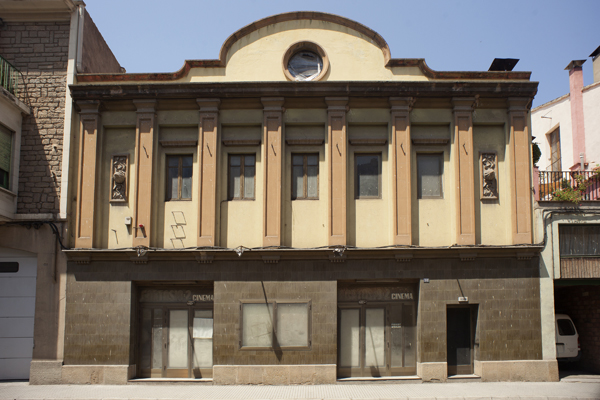
Cinema Fantasio in Ponts

The cinema of Catalonia encompasses film productions produced and acted preferably by people from Catalonia. It is a subset of Spanish cinema and includes movies both in Catalan and Spanish.

The Catalan Academy of Cinema was created to recognize and support Catalan productions, and annually commemorates the best films with the Gaudí Awards.

== History ==
In the first 30 years of the 20th century a number of Catalan films were made; in 1931 the Catalan government, the Generalitat, was restored and in 1932 it set up a film committee which encouraged the making of the first Catalan feature films, in Barcelona and Valencia. In the early 1930s Barcelona had four large film studios and the film industry flourished in the city. After the war had ended the Nationalist government had a policy of centralisation and the suppression of regional nationalism which existed in Catalonia and in the Basque country. Film making continued in Barcelona but began to decline. As public use of the Catalan language was now prohibited no films could be made in the language. In 1965 it again became possible to make a Catalan version of a film; Armando Moreno's Maria Rosa was made in Castilian and dubbed into Catalan; Moreno's wife, Nuria Espert played the title role. The film was of poor quality.

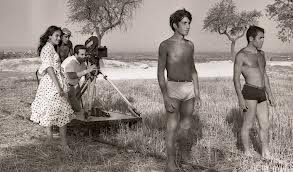
"La horda" (1969)

The Institut de Cinema Català was founded in 1975 by a group of over 70 professionals from all areas of the cinema. It was divided into four sections: commissions for education, labour and production, distribution and exhibition, and the economic commission. The first films made were two documentaries by Francesc Bellmunt (Canet rock and La nova cançò) and La ciutat cremada by Antoni Riba. In the mid 1970s there also existed in Catalonia some groups of "alternative" film-makers, e.g. the Central del Corto.

== Notable productions ==
- In Catalan (some of these also contain scenes in Spanish, due to the bilingual nature of the region):
  - Aro Tolbukhin
  - Beloved/Friend
  - La ciutat cremada (dir. Antoni Riba)
  - Els Nens Salvatges
  - El pasajero clandestino
  - The Sea
  - The Tit and the Moon
  - Black Bread
  - Story of My Death
  - Summer 1993
  - Pàtria
- In Spanish
  - Balseros
  - Tras el cristal
  - The Astronaut Lovers (dir. Marco Berger)

== See also ==
- Barcelona School of Film
