= Horseplay (2022 film) =

2022 Argentine dramedy film

- Theatrical film poster
- Spanish: Los agitadores
- Directed by: Marco Berger
- Written by: Marco Berger
- Produced by: Marco Berger; Murray Dibbs
- Starring: Bruno Giganti; Augustín Machta; Franco De La Puente
- Cinematography: Nahuel Berger
- Edited by: Marco Berger
- Music by: Pedro Irusta
- Release dates: July 2, 2022 (Karlovy Vary); June 1, 2023 (Argentina)
- Running time: 102 mins.
- Country: Argentina
- Language: Spanish

Horseplay (Spanish: Los agitadores) is a 2022 Argentine independent erotic dramedy film written and directed by Marco Berger. The film stars an ensemble cast, featuring Bruno Giganti, Augustín Machta, Franco De La Puente, et al. It premiered at the Karlovy Vary International Film Festival in 2022, before a limited theatrical release throughout Argentina in 2023.

== Synopsis ==
A group of young men at a gathering in a luxury villa test each other's boundaries.

== Cast ==
- Bruno Giganti as Nico
- Augustín Machta as Andy
- Franco De La Puente as Juanma-Poli
- Iván Masliah as Artur
- Facundo Mas as Luquitas
- Ivan Benitez as Fran, El Gordo
- Carlos Carneglia as Daro-Belo
- Jordán Romero as Gago
- Fernando De Simone as Faro

== Reception ==
On the review aggregator website Rotten Tomatoes, 57% of 7 critics' reviews are positive, with an average rating of 5.50/10.

Stephen Dalton of The Film Verdict raved: "Argentinean director Marco Berger turns his queer eye on the straight guys in this darkly funny critique of homophobic machismo." Zachary Wild of The Rectangular View commented: "The acting, pacing, and visuals make it easy to watch, and it has an ending that’s hard to forget." Chad Armstong of The Queer Review added: "A slow burn, [the film] avoids easy conclusions."

Rubén Rosario of Miami ArtZine praised the film, likening it to a past work: "The film's setting and episodic structure are strongly reminiscent of Berger's Taekwondo (2016)...He wants to deconstruct, not titillate, and he pointedly chooses to end the film with a sudden act of violence – abrupt, ruthless, deeply effective." John Paul King of the Washington Blade revered the theme: "Its insight into hyper-hypermasculinity and its correlation with social condition around sex & gender norms rings true."

Rich Cline of Shadows on the Wall gave it 3.5/5 stars and lauded the ulterior motive behind the full frontal male nudity: "As usual, Berger puts many bare bodies on display along the way, as these guys have no qualms about lounging around naked together. Of course, this cleverly feeds into Berger's central idea exposing the myth of a straight society in which divergence is a problem."

Erdinch Yigitce of Film Cred said: "The sour and pessimistic final act seems inevitable and predictable, but this is another sharply observed study of machismo from Berger with the sting of subversion." Alastair James of Attitude rated it 3/5 stars and concurred: "[The film] exposes toxic masculinity for all that it is – fragile – and built on long-outdated ideas of what it is to be a man."

Kevin Taft of We Live Entertainment rated the film 6.5/10: "Don’t get me wrong, [the film] is a fascinating watch for a number of reasons, but the ultimate point might be lost among the naked skin, bare butts, and exposed private parts of Berger's rough-housing actors." Noel Murray of the Los Angeles Times commented: "It’s more a series of thematically similar vignettes, only a few of which connect up into something resembling a story."

Dennis Harvey of 48 Hills derided the film for its lack of plot: "But his latest is more like the 2016 Taekwondo, a near-plotless excuse to show off a slew of such guys at leisure in various states of undress, both resisting and indulging a rampant homoeroticism. Indeed, it’s practically a remake, with another group of rambunctious dudes in another rural-vacation-home setting, their juvenile antics basically one long conundrum of 'You homo' taunts and compulsively gay-adjacent behavior."

Kyle Turner of The New York Times lambasted the film, chiding it for the same reasons others applauded: "[The film] is less an acutely mapped-out anthropological study into toxic masculinity and pervasive homophobia and misogyny, and more like having to spend a day chilling with the most annoying guys you know."
