= El tercero =

- Spanish: El Tercero
- Directed by: Rodrigo Guerrero
- Screenplay by: Rodrigo Guerrero
- Produced by: Nicolás Batlle; Patricio Funes; Rodrigo Guerrero; Ricardo Gutiérrez; Lorena Quevedo
- Starring: Carlos Echevarría; Emiliano Dionisi; Nicolás Armengol
- Cinematography: Gustavo Tejeda
- Edited by: Rodrigo Guerrero
- Music by: Tomás Barry; Silvina Costa; Félix Cristiani; Daniel Melero
- Production company: Twins Latin Films
- Release date: April 3, 2014
- Running time: 70 minutes
- Country: Argentina
- Language: Spanish

The Third One (Spanish: El tercero) is a 2014 gay-themed romantic Argentinian movie written and directed by Rodrigo Guerrero, starring Carlos Echevarría, Emiliano Dionisi and Nicolás Armengol.

== Plot ==
Fede (Emiliano Dionisi), a shy college student, meets Franco (Nicolás Armengol) and Hernán (Carlos Echevarría), an older gay couple, on an erotic chat. The three men are very forward online and decide to have dinner and then sex at Franco's and Hernán's house. Once they meet in person, however, they all appear to be awkward and initially have trouble connecting. They talk over dinner and get to know some intimate facts about their lives, like Fede's mother suicide and some of Franco's and Hernán's problems, while the couple's fun memories and banter also provide some lighter and comedic moments. The three men finally have passionate sex, then tenderly fall asleep together. The next morning, the three men prepare to go to work or classes while also flirting and chatting some more about their lives. Before parting ways, they cheerfully suggest the possibility of seeing each other again. In the last scene, Fede is shown in class recounting the events of the night, with a smile on his face.

== Reception ==
Scott Ellot in his Iris Prize Festival 2014 review called it an "intimate and interesting film about love, relationships and sex in the 21st century" noting that the film shows how "unconventional sexual arrangements" can be lived without shame while being "fun, sexy and very human". Derek Winnert in his Classic Movie Review noted how the film stands in favour of a "ménage à trois", stating that the dinner scene is the real highlight of the movie while the sex scenes were unnecessarily long.

José Antonio Martín rated the film 3 stars out of 5 and, admitting the plot was not very rich, found the film promising and praised its general approach. La Voz praised the acting while El Patagónico underlined the scenographic work and esthetics of the film.

== See also ==
- LGBTQ cinema in Latin America
- Threesome
- Polyamory
