= Carlos Echevarría =

Argentine actor, producer, and writer

Carlos Echevarría is an Argentine film and television actor, producer, and writer.

He works in the cinema of Argentina.

== Filmography ==
- Olympic Garage (1999)
- Vamos ganando (2001)
- Sons and Daughters (2001)
- Los Inquilinos del infierno (2004)
- Vacaciones día uno (2004)
- Ciudad para vivir (2005)
- Como un avión estrellado (2005)
- A Year Without Love (2005)
- Stephanie (2005)
- Otros besos brujos (2006)
- Un Grito de Corazón (2006)
- Celo (2006)
- Impunidad (2007)
- Lo siniestro (2008)
- Desbordar (2009)
- Hoy la turbulencia del ayer (2009)
- Absent (Ausente) (2010)
- Armonias del Caos (2011)
- Absence (2011)
- Solo (2013)
- El tercero (The Third One) (2014)

== Television ==
- Archivo negro (1997) (mini TV Series)
- 1000 millones (2002) TV Series a.k.a. Love Heritage
- Juego de opuestos: Las reglas de la conquista (2003) (mini TV Series)
