= Perro Perro =

2025 Argentine romantic dramedy film

Perro-Perro
- Theatrical film poster
- Directed by: Marco Berger
- Written by: Marco Berger
- Produced by: Marco Berger
- Starring: Germán Flood; Juan Ramos
- Cinematography: Martín Farina
- Edited by: Marco Berger
- Music by: Pedro Irusta
- Release dates: June 24, 2025 (Frameline); March 10, 2026 (Argentina)
- Running time: 101 mins.
- Country: Argentina
- Language: Spanish

Perro-Perro (lit. 'Dog-Dog') is a 2025 Argentine independent surrealistic homoerotic romantic dramedy film written and directed by Marco Berger. The film stars Germán Flood and Juan Ramos. It premiered at the Frameline Film Festival in 2025, before a limited theatrical release throughout Argentina in 2026.

== Synopsis ==
While vacationing, Juan finds a stray man acting like a dog. He cares for him with baths, food and love. His girlfriend cautions against getting too attached.

== Cast ==
- Germán Flood as Juan
- Juan Ramos as Hombre a.k.a. Max
- Bianca Brandimarte as Jazmin
- Matias Quiroga as Rama
- Antonia De Michelis as Vecina
- Aldana Dante as Viole
- Marcela Avani as Amiga
- Carlos Naso as Hombre Intruso

== Reception ==
Dionar Hidalgo of Algo Mas Que Ciné rated it 3.5/4 stars and lauded the performances: "In this unstable environment, Juan Ramos delivers one of the most daring performances in Marco Berger's filmography...eminently physical, yet never empty." Derek Winnert of DerekWinnert.com awarded the film 3/5 stars: "Germán Flood is equally expressive and sympathetic in a role that doesn't have that many significant lines either. It's all in the eyes, the looks, the love." Rich Cline of Shadows on the Wall rated the film 4/5 stars and remarked:"Where this goes is offbeat, pointed and almost elegiac, with complexities to ponder. And we might want an adorable pet man of our own."

Edin Čusto of The Self-Reproaching Critic positively critiqued the dynamics: "Similarly, one can argue that the film holds a mirror to the notion and ethics of pet ownership and certain practices humans have normalized when it comes to our furry companions." José Mayorga of Queer Guru praised the black and white cinematography and direction: "This is a rare animalistic tale of longing and detachment, beautifully shot in the tradition of Berger's aesthetic of insinuation."

Alejandro Dramis of Página 12 applauded the exploration of deeper themes: "But also, on the symbolic plane in which the film moves comfortably, Perro Perro manifestly exposes contemporary heterosexual masculinities, their resistance to change and their hidden fragilities, highlighting above all their dangers and threats, with the aim of showing the public the two faces of a creature that can go from sympathy to generating fear or violence in a single instant, as some of the female characters in the film make clear by not wanting to be near this "man" found in the forest."
