= The Astronaut Lovers =

2024 Argentine–Spanish LGBTQ+ rom-com film by Marco Berger

- Theatrical film poster
- Spanish: Los amantes astronautas
- Directed by: Marco Berger
- Written by: Marco Berger
- Produced by: Daniel Chocrón; Ángeles Hernández; Alberto Masliah; David Matamoros
- Starring: Lautaro Bettoni; Javier Orán
- Cinematography: Mariano De Rosa
- Edited by: Marco Berger
- Music by: Pedro Irusta
- Production companies: Mr Miyagi Films; Sombracine; Cine Argentino; Catalan Films; INCAA
- Distributed by: Dark Star Pictures (North America); Cinetren (Argentina); Optimale (France); Wildstar International (Worldwide)
- Release dates: 18 April 2024 (BAFICI); 31 October 2024 (Argentina)
- Running time: 116 mins.
- Countries: Argentina; Spain
- Language: Spanish
- Budget: $200,000
- Box office: $23,222

The Astronaut Lovers (Spanish: Los amantes astronautas) is a 2024 Argentinian–Spanish LGBTQ+ romantic comedy film, directed and written by Marco Berger. The film stars Javier Orán and Lautaro Bettoni. It premiered at Buenos Aires International Festival of Independent Cinema in 2024, before its release throughout Argentina later that year.

== Plot ==
=== Synopsis ===
Pedro, an out gay man, returns from Spain to Argentina to spend the holidays with friends and family. He meets up with Maxi, a straight-identifying childhood friend who attracts him. Both engage in a playful game of flirtation and seduction, as one begins to question his sexual orientation.

=== Summary ===
Pedro arrives from Spain at his cousin Juan's summer house in Argentina. Juan's girlfriend, Lula, and several other friends are also staying there, including Maxi, whom Pedro observes from the window. Pedro and Maxi went to summer camp together as preteens.

Maxi walks along the beach and sits next to Pedro. The two begin having a conversation about Pedro being gay and Maxi's ex-girlfriend thinking Maxi "looked gay". Maxi shares his paradoxical theory about Pinocchio's nose growing, relating it to a euphemism about his erections. From there, playful banter and sexual innuendo begin between the two.

The next morning, Pedro accompanies Maxi to the video store where the two bond over films. On a subsequent trip, Maxi reveals that he told the clerk (who flirts with him) that he and Pedro are a couple. The following day, Pedro receives compliments about his penis while changing in front of Maxi—who then promises to show Pedro his in the future. In a follow-up scene, Pedro is bathing but allows Maxi to use the toilet.

While the two are playing paddleball, Maxi's recent ex-girlfriend, Sabrina, appears. Maxi then kisses Pedro on the cheek a few times. After she leaves, Maxi admits he also told her that Pedro was his boyfriend. Pedro inquires why they broke up, and Maxi reveals that it was due to a failed threesome with another guy. In the van, they have a discussion about Artist's Shit by Piero Manzoni.

Maxi and Pedro attend a party at Sabrina's place, where they enter holding hands. They then entertain a gaggle of females; Maxi concocts a story of how they met wherein Maxi realized he was bisexual. Maxi attempts to kiss Pedro, but the latter rebuffs claiming that he does not want to make others uncomfortable. After discovering they both wipe their penises after they urinate, Maxi continues to press Pedro about kissing. Pedro insinuates it might go too far beyond just "playing hard".

On the car ride back to Juan's, Maxi insists Pedro taste his saliva. He declines. Then Maxi asks Pedro to give him his, and proceeds to suck on Pedro's finger, causing the latter to get an erection. Maxi does not find it sexual and proclaims his will not grow, so he makes an open bet with Pedro. When Pedro sucks on Maxi's finger while driving, he too gets an erection and loses the bet.

Pedro decides they must pretend to be a couple for the next three days. Maxi agrees, and is astonished to discover none of the other houseguests appear surprised. In fact, all of them suspected there was more than just a bromance blooming. They move their beds together, laughing privately about fooling everyone. Maxi shows his erect penis to Pedro the next day, fulfilling his promise.

At another party, they continue joking about films, such as 2001: A Space Odyssey, Snow White and the Seven Dwarfs, etc., while emphasizing their fauxmance. Suddenly, Pedro says their game is causing feelings to develop and insists upon going home, which unnerves Maxi—until the former reveals that he is merely kidding.

The next morning, Juan and Lula inquire about their sex life, since Juan found Pedro's box of condoms unopened. Pedro confesses it is just a bet. Lula and Juan conspire to get the two to kiss for photos for Lula's sister. Pedro is apprehensive, but Maxi is willing. Thus, they kiss—multiple times. Afterwards, Maxi gets up and attempts to conceal his "morning wood". Later on, Pedro and Maxi discuss having sex and/or being boyfriends, and whether or not that would be detrimental to their friendship.

During a game of Charades, Pedro's miming of his in-jokes with Maxi leads to them guessing the clues correctly. Maxi hugs and kisses Pedro. Afterwards, they make love for the first time. Later the next day, Pedro learns it was due to Sabrina's encouragement and decides to leave. Maxi chases after him.

A flashback montage reveals several romantic moments, such as Maxi giving Pedro a Disney Pinocchio toy, when Maxi descends upon Pedro crying in the woods. Maxi apologizes and admits he loves Pedro, and desires to be with him only. Pedro smiles. The two embrace and passionately kiss.

== Cast ==
- Javier Orán as Pedro
- Lautaro Bettoni as Maxi
- Agustín Frías-Silva as Juan
- Mora Arenillas as Sabrina "Sabri"
- Ailín Salas as Lula
- Iván Masliah as Lucas
- Camila Del Campo as Veronica "Vero"
- Melina Furgiuela as Martina "Martu"
- Fernando Malfitano as Federico "Fede"
- Violeta Cárcova as Antonella "Anto"
- Augustín Cervigni as Video Store Salesman

== Release ==
=== Festivals ===
The film premiered at the Buenos Aires International Festival of Independent Cinema on 18 April 2024. Next, it arrived at the Guadalajara International Film Festival on 11 June 2024. It then appeared at Frameline Film Festival on 25 June 2024, Mardi Gras Film Festival on 6 August 2024, Vancouver Queer Film Festival (a.k.a. OUT on Screen) on 20 September 2024, San Sebastián International Film Festival on 28 September 2024, and OUTshine Film Festival on 25 October 2024.

It continued its run of primarily distinct LGBTQ+ festivals at Mezipatra on 10 November 2024, followed by Chéries-Chéris on 17 November 2024. Next, it appeared at BFI Flare: London LGBTIQ+ Film Festival on 27 March 2025. Then, it arrived at the São Paulo International Film Festival on 7 June 2025, followed by the Sofia International Film Festival on 8 June 2025 for Sofia Pride. Finally, it debuted at the Taiwan International Queer Film Festival on 12 October 2025.

=== Theatrical ===
It first premiered in cinemas in Italy (in limited theatrical release) on 20 June 2024, before being released throughout Argentina on 31 October 2024. It made its limited American debut on 18 March 2025, followed by a 2 July 2025 run in France.

== Reception ==
Rich Cline of Shadows on the Wall scored it 8/10, lauding the film for being "smart and funny" and added: "This romcom from Argentina takes an audacious premise and spins it with snappy dialog that playfully references a wide range of movies along with the titular metaphorical running gags". Rubén Rosario of Miami ArtZine declared: "The immense appeal of this balmy summertime tale, another winsome hangout movie from Argentinean writer-director Marco Berger, can be summed up in three little words: wordplay as foreplay."

Alberto Libera of Scraps from the Loft further commended the filmmaker's perspective: "Berger has no intention of keeping his audience in suspense: his directorial approach is minimal, gentle, ironic, and participatory, dominated by a great desire to live a reality that is always everyday, believable, and truthful." Richard Maguire of The Reviews Hub called it "smart and unabashedly romantic…giving hope to every gay man who is in love with one of their straight male friends".

Corina J. Poore of Latino Life rated it 3/4 stars and praised the lead actors, Javier Orán and Lautaro Bettoni, as being "superb as Pedro and Maxi [respectively], holding the film together". Chad Armstrong of The Queer Review concurred, giving it 3.5/4 stars, and remarking: "They are an instantly likeable duo, quickly winning the audience's support and trust." Derek Winnert of DerekWinnert.com gave it 3/4 stars, highlighting "the appeal and skills of Bettoni and Orán, who play it very nicely, honestly and convincingly, quite subtly actually".

Meredith Taylor of Filmuforia awarded it 3.5/4 stars, comparing it to "the four-season moral tales of Éric Rohmer films". Cédric Lépine of Mediapart echoed: "A true heir to Rohmer in his seductive use of embodied dialogue and the intellectualized, discreet distance between the two protagonists, Berger offers at the heart of his film marvelous dialogues that energize both the mise-en-scène and the actors who bring them to life." Silvi Vann-Wall of Screen Hub, with 4/5 stars, quipped: "A cold shower may be in order after this one."

Robert St. Martin of The Hollywood Times stated: "The film proves to be a comedy of errors on the value of friendship and love regardless of gender." Zachary Wild of The Rectangular View, rating it 4/5 stars, raved: "The film is a master class in beauty, simplicity, and tone." Fabrizio Croce of Close-Up appreciated the dialogue: "The turns of phrase are never empty, but spirals around an almost tactile core of desiring hunger."

Frédéric Mignard of Ciné-Dweller, via 6.5/10 stars, proclaimed it "reinvents the romantic comedy in a tenderness of words that may seem contradictory to its flowery language". Elisabetta Bartucca of Movie Player implored viewers to "indulge in this rom-com where love is simply love, regardless of gender". Leonardo Lardieri of The Searchers noted, in a 3.8/5 review, that: "discussing human excrement, along with its phallic dimensions and qualities, with brilliant dialogue often peppered with lofty references, is entertaining & emblematic."

Raffaele Meale of Quinlan mused: "And in the focus and aesthetic and narrative clarity of the finale, one can also detect Berger's more inspired poetic vision, which had been lacking here and there throughout the story." Meanwhile, Anthony Ray Bench of Video Librarian opined: "What could have been a cathartic exploration of longing and identity instead drifts into frustration and ambiguity."

== Music ==
The score was composed of primarily original music from the film's composer Pedro Irusta, except where otherwise indicated.

1. "Water Flowing"
2. "Quantum Love"
3. "Keep On"
4. "Tema Principal"
5. "Estamos Locos"
6. "About Love"
7. "Don't Give Up"
8. "Silver Moon Confides" (feat. Inuit)
9. "Tema Final"
10. "Goliardos" (by Club Artistico Libertad)

== Awards ==
Year	Award	Category	Nominee(s)	Result	Ref.
2024	Buenos Aires International Festival of Independent Cinema	Best Performance(s)	Lautaro Bettoni & Javier Orán (shared)	Won	
2024	Guadalajara International Film Festival	Best Performance(s)	Lautaro Bettoni & Javier Orán (shared)	Won	
2024	San Sebastián International Film Festival	Best Latin American Film	Marco Berger	Nominated	
2025	Sofia International Film Festival	Best Feature Film	Marco Berger	Nominated	
2025	Florida Film Critics Circle Awards	Best Original Screenplay	Marco Berger	Nominated	
2025	Martín Fierro Awards	Best Original Screenplay	Marco Berger	Nominated	
2025	Martín Fierro Awards	Best Original Soundtrack	Pedro Irusta	Nominated	
