= Mateo Chiarino =

Uruguayan actor, writer and director

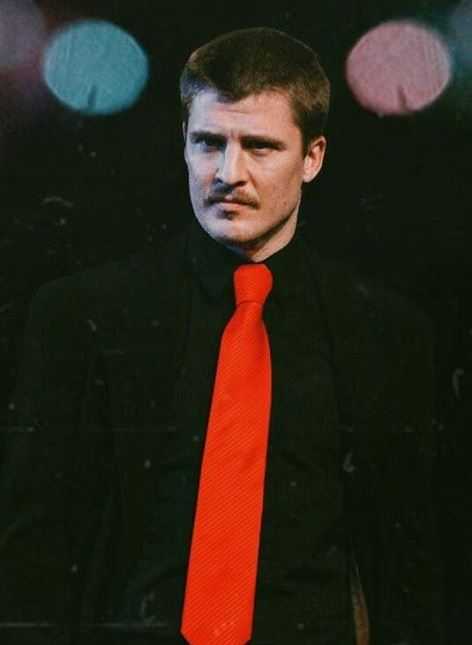
- Chiarino in Cuántos fantasmas en un beso
- Born: 1 October 1983 (age 41); Montevideo, Uruguay
- Occupations: Actor; Writer; Director
- Years active: 2008–present
- Spouse: Cecilia Cósero (m. 2013)

Mateo Chiarino is a Uruguayan actor, writer, and director of film, stage, and television. He is currently based in Buenos Aires, Argentina.

== Early life ==
Chiarino was born in Montevideo, Uruguay. He began his formal acting studies in Montevideo at the Margarita Xirgu Multidisciplinary School of Dramatic Art completed in 2005 and the Escuela de Cine del Uruguay (Film School of Uruguay) completed in 2006.

== Career ==
Chiarino started his artistic career as a stage actor in his home country, Uruguay. He made his film acting debut in the drama Masángeles (2008). Subsequently, he was cast in various Spanish speaking films such as Cinco (2010), La culpa del cordero (2012), La máquina que escupe monstruos y la chica de mis sueños (2012), and Thesis on a Homicide (2013). Chiarino is known for his lead role in the Hawaii (2013) film in which he gained international attention from viewers.

In 2017, Chiarino made his directorial debut as theatre director for the Uz, el pueblo stage play production. His theatrical solo performance for the 2019's Nüremberg stage play garnered a nomination from Argentina's Asociación de Cronistas del Espectáculo (ACE) Awards for his excellent critical portrayal of a young skinhead. Chiarino currently resides in Buenos Aires, Argentina and is involved in various theatrical productions in his home town. Additionally, he teaches screenwriting via workshops.

== Filmography ==
=== Films ===
Title	Year	Role	Notes
El tren de las ocho	2006		Director; short film
Justo el 17	2007		Director; short film
Masángeles (Polvo nuestro que estás en los cielos)	2008		
V	2008		Short film
Cinco (Five)	2010	Esteban	Credited as Matheo Chiarino
La culpa del cordero	2012	Alvaro	
La máquina que escupe monstruos y la chica de mis sueños	2012	Facundo Lee	
Hawaii	2013	Martin	
Thesis on a Homicide	2013	Villazán	
Los nadies	2014		Writer
Amalia y Eduardo	2017	Eduardo	Short film
Luces Malas	2017		Scriptwriter
Naufragios	2024	Ignacio (sailor)	

=== Television ===
Title	Year	Role	Notes
Uruguayos campeones	2004		
Piso 8	2007	Tomás Darko	Main cast; 7 episodes
Buscando a no sé quién	2009		
Proyecto aluvión	2011	Leonardo	El luto episode; Also credited as writer
Familia en venta	2013–14		Writer
Guapas	2015	Mozo del Pampa	Falsa alarma episode
Feriados (Serie de TV)	2017	Ramiro	Also credited as writer
Argentina, tierra de amor y venganza	2019	Basualdo	Appeared in more than 100 episodes
Naturaleza muerta	2021	Alexander	

=== Theatre ===
Title	Year	Role	Notes
Danubio azul	2001		
El arca de Noé	2002		
Extraviada	2002		
Teatro y memoria	2002		
Los cuervos	2003		
Mi muñequita (la farsa)	2004–12	Tio	Also performed in international festivals in 2008–2009
El saludador	2005		
Titus Andrónicus	2006		
Cigarros	2007		
Mujeres infinitas	2007		Audiovisual
Star wars episodio 4.1	2008	Luke Skywalker	
El portero de la estación Windsor	2010	Narrator	
La piel de la manzana	2015		Photography
El asesino del sueño	2015–16		
Uz, el pueblo	2017–18	Voice of God	Director
Ex-que revienten los actores	2018		Director
Trinidad Guevara	2018–19		Video production
La pesca de la anguila	2019		Director
Nüremberg	2019	young skinhead	Nominated-Asociación de Cronistas del Espectáculo Awards
Vamos viendo	2019		Director
Cuántos fantasmas en un beso	2019–2020	Mauricio	
La transferencia	2020–2021		Writer
Clausura del amor	2022	Israel	
Los empeños de una casa	2023	Don Juan	
El Arte De Esgrimir	2024	Enzo	
Incógnito	2024		
Encuentros en Constitución	2025		Director

== Accolades ==
Year	Award	Category	Result	For
2019	Asociación de Cronistas del Espectáculo	Actor in play for a single character	Nominated	Nüremberg
