= The Black Frost =

2015 film

- Directed by: Maximiliano Schonfeld
- Written by: Maximiliano Schonfeld
- Starring: Ailín Salas
- Release date: November 2015 (Mar del Plata Film Festival)
- Running time: 90 minutes
- Country: Argentina
- Language: Spanish

The Black Frost (Spanish: La helada negra) is a 2015 Argentine drama film directed by Maximiliano Schonfeld. It was shown in the Panorama section at the 66th Berlin International Film Festival.

== Cast ==
- Ailín Salas
- Lucas Schell
