= Juan Pablo Cestaro =

Argentine actor

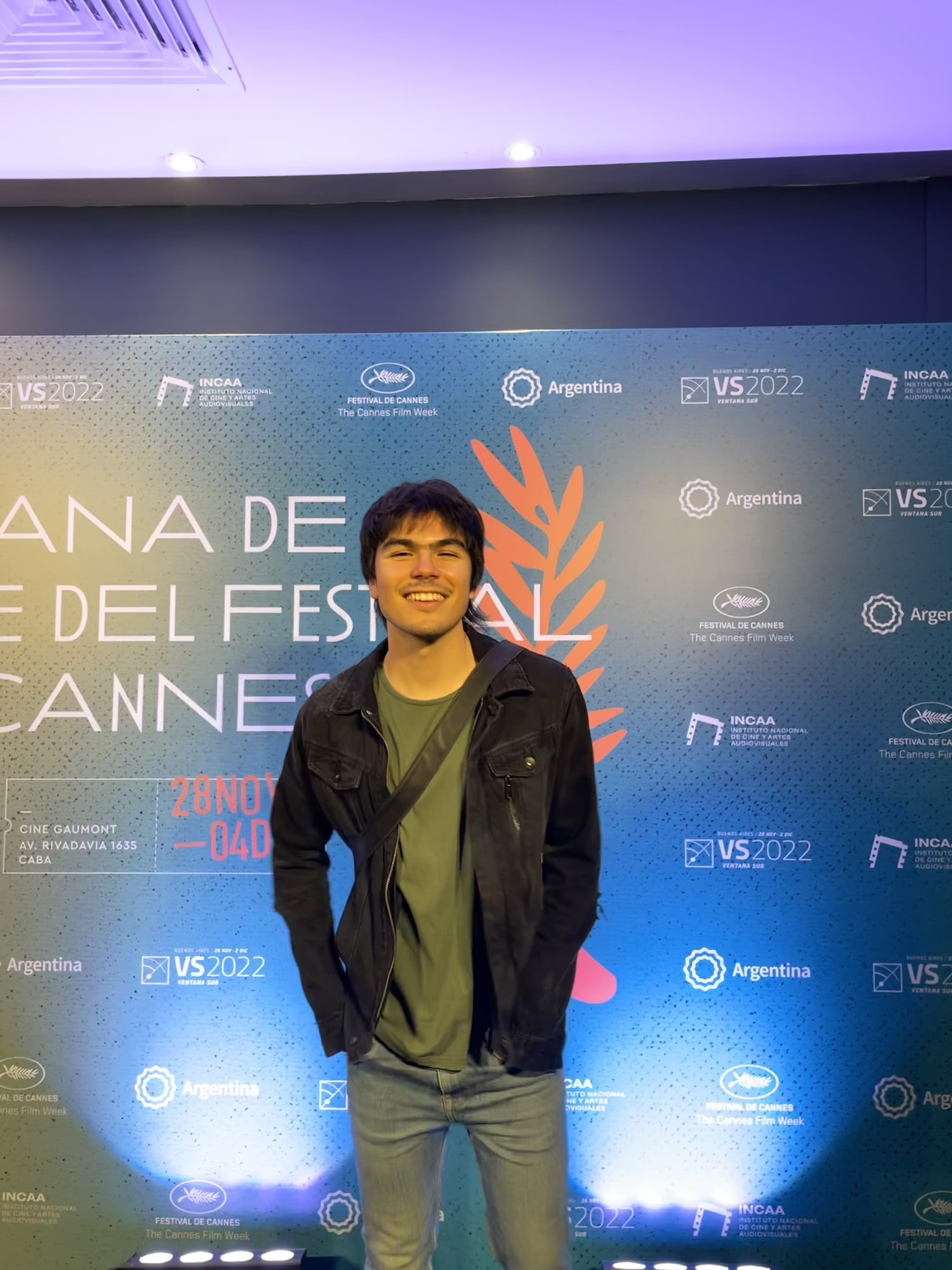
- Born: 1997 (age 28–29); La Plata, Argentina
- Notable work: El Marginal

Juan Pablo Cestaro (born 1997 in La Plata, Buenos Aires) is an Argentine actor. He is best known for his roles in the series El Marginal and the feature film El cazador.

== Biography ==
Cestaro studied acting in workshops in La Plata before moving to Buenos Aires, where he continued his training as an actor.

In 2020, he starred in the LGBT-themed film El cazador, directed by Marco Berger, which premiered at the Rotterdam International Film Festival. That same year, he had a supporting role in El Cadáver Insepulto. He was nominated for a Silver Condor Award, which he won in 2021.

In 2021, he released the web series Cachi Cachi, which he directed and starred in. Between 2021 and 2022, he appeared alongside Juan Minujín in the fourth and fifth seasons of El Marginal as "El Bromas." In 2024, he filmed the feature film Llajua in Bolivia.
