= Esteros (film) =

2016 film directed by Papu Curotto

- Directed by: Papu Curotto
- Starring: Ignacio Rogers; Esteban Masturini
- Release date: 27 May 2016 (IOFF)
- Running time: 88 minutes
- Countries: Argentina; Brazil; France
- Languages: Spanish; Portuguese

Esteros is a 2016 international co-production drama film directed by Papu Curotto.

== Storyline ==
Childhood friends Matías (played by Joaquín Parada as a boy, and Ignacio Rogers as an adult) and Jerónimo (played by Blas Finardi Niz as a boy, and Esteban Masturini as an adult) reach adolescence and experience sexual attraction to each other, before being separated by circumstances. Later, as young adults, they meet again, and the film follows themes of complicated relationships and sexual tensions, as well as issues of internalized homophobia.
