= Cinenacional.com =

Cinema website in Argentina

- Screenshot Cinenacional.com homepage
- Website type: Database
- Available in: Spanish, English
- Website: www.cinenacional.com
- Commercial: Yes
- Registration: Optional
- Launched: June 9, 2001; 25 years ago
- Current status: Active

Cinenacional.com is a web portal and web-based database about Argentine cinema. It is the most comprehensive site for information about the Argentine film industry, with a vast array of information on films, television programs, directors, actors, cinematographers, film editors, production designers, and film viewing figures. As of July 2022 it has 53,567 articles on films in its database, 11,074 technical data sheets, and 25,478 photos. The site receives an average of 18,000 views a day.

== History ==
The management team was organized in August 2000, and went on-line on June 9, 2001. The founding directors were Diego Papic and Pablo Wittner. Jorge C. Bernárdez, coauthor of #ElFinDelPeriodismo (2017), was among the critics. The site claims that the website was labelled of cultural interest by the Buenos Aires government resolution # 136 in 2006 and that since 2007 it has been supported by the Instituto Nacional de Cine y Artes Audiovisuales (INCAA), the official governmental organ that regulates the cinema industry in Argentina. About 15% of the site traffic comes from mainland Spain and about 10% from Mexico.

== Reception ==
DK Eyewitness Guides on Argentina or Buenos Aires recommend the use of the site to find information on Argentine films. In the German language travel Stefan Loose Reiseführer Argentinien mit Montevideo it has been cited as the "National Film Database", where "you can find everything about Argentine films, actors, screenwriters and more". In his book New Argentine Film: Other Worlds, the film critic Gonzalo Aguilar states that "I should point out that despite the usefulness of cinenacional.com, its lists are compiled not according to film titles but through the suggestions of members of the cast/crew."

Analysts from Cinenacional.com, such as Diego Papic, have been cited in the main national newspapers such as La Nación, and its data, such as on film viewership, have been cited in books such as Sophia A. McClennen's Globalization and Latin American Cinema: Toward a New Critical Paradigm (2015).
