= Hawaii (2013 film) =

2013 Argentine film

- Theatrical release poster
- Directed by: Marco Berger
- Written by: Marco Berger
- Produced by: Marco Berger; Pedro Irusta
- Starring: Manuel Vignau; Mateo Chiarino; Luz Palazón; Antonia De Michelis; Manuel Martínez Sobrado
- Cinematography: Tomás Pérez Silva
- Edited by: Marco Berger
- Music by: Pedro Irusta
- Release date: April 13, 2013 (Buenos Aires Festival)
- Running time: 102 minutes
- Country: Argentina
- Language: Spanish

Hawaii is a 2013 romantic drama film by Argentine director Marco Berger. Set in rural Argentina, it tells the story of two young men from different social backgrounds coming to terms with their growing attraction for each other.

== Plot ==
Martín (Mateo Chiarino), an orphan, arrives at his former hometown hoping to stay with his aunt after his grandmother had died. He finds out that his aunt had moved without leaving a forwarding address. With no place to stay and little money, he beds down behind the ruins of an abandoned building. He looks around for odd jobs and is eventually hired by the writer Eugenio (Manuel Vignau), a former childhood playmate. Martín does not want to admit that he is homeless, and lies to Eugenio that he is staying with his aunt. Eugenio eventually finds out about Martín's situation and convinces Martín to stay at his house for the summer.

At first Eugenio does not seemingly remember much about Martín, but little by little they start to recall their shared memories as children. Eugenio realizes his growing attraction to Martín but is reluctant to pursue it, as he does not want to seem to be taking advantage of Martín's current financial situation. He is also afraid that even if the soft-spoken Martín might reciprocate his feelings, it might only be because Martín feels indebted to him. Martín himself is attracted to Eugenio, but he does not know if Eugenio is gay. And given his current circumstances, he does not want to presume anything based on Eugenio's kindness.

Nonetheless, Eugenio and Martín slowly grow closer together, and Eugenio finds it becoming increasingly difficult to hide his attraction. One day while moving some furniture, Eugenio accidentally knocks over some drawings of naked men from his desk. Martín sees the drawings, but Eugenio pointedly avoids talking about it. It dawns on Martín that Eugenio might be attracted to him. Martín confirms his suspicions when he sees Eugenio's flustered reaction after he deliberately strips in front of Eugenio one night under the guise of wanting to do laundry.

Martín kisses Eugenio the next morning, confident that Eugenio is also attracted to him. But Eugenio unexpectedly rebuffs him, and Martín leaves confused. That afternoon, Eugenio discovers that Martín had packed up and left. He searches for him for several days but is unable to find him. Eugenio remembers Martín reminiscing about "dos ananás" ('two pineapples'). He realizes that Martín was talking about a picture from a Hawaii reel that they used to look at on a View-Master as children. He looks for the reel and the old View-Master and leaves them behind the abandoned building where Martín had been sleeping. A few days later, Martín comes back, carrying the View-Master with him. They smile at each other and kiss.

== Cast ==
- Manuel Vignau as Eugenio
- Mateo Chiarino as Martín
- Luz Palazón as the señora
- Antonia De Michelis as the neighbor
- Manuel Martínez Sobrado as Eugenio's brother

== Production ==
Hawaii was produced by a partnership between director and screenwriter Marco Berger and the musician/composer Pedro Irusta. It was funded through Kickstarter campaigns. The first campaign with a target budget of $40,000, ended unsuccessfully. The campaign was relaunched with a smaller target budget of $20,000. It successfully raised $27,000 allowing the shooting to continue. Berger describes Hawaii as a "Jane Austen contemporary story", noting that it evokes the same classic tale of two people from different social backgrounds and the dynamics between the powerful and the helpless.

== Screenings ==
The film was an official selection at the Buenos Aires International Festival of Independent Cinema (BAFICI), the BFI Flare: London LGBT Film Festival of the BFI London Film Festival, the Thessaloniki International Film Festival, and films festivals in Barcelona, Seoul, Taipei, Copenhagen, and Berlin.

== See also ==
- Ausente (film)
- Plan B (2009 film)
