= Butterfly (2015 film) =

2015 film

- Theatrical film poster
- Directed by: Marco Berger
- Written by: Marco Berger
- Starring: Javier De Pietro
- Release dates: 7 February 2015 (Berlin); 6 August 2015 (Argentina)
- Running time: 100 minutes
- Country: Argentina
- Language: Spanish

Butterfly (Spanish: Mariposa) is a 2015 Argentine drama film directed by Marco Berger. It was screened in the Panorama section of the 65th Berlin International Film Festival.

== Cast ==
- Javier De Pietro
- Ailín Salas
- Malena Villa
- Jorge Díez
- María Laura Cali
- Justo Calabria
- Julian Infantino
- Pilar Fridman

== See also ==
- List of lesbian, gay, bisexual or transgender-related films of 2015
