= Absence (novel) =

2025 book by Issa Quincy

- First edition
- Author: Issa Quincy
- Language: English
- Genre: Literary Fiction
- Publisher: Granta
- Publication date: 08 May 2025
- Publication place: United Kingdom, United States
- Media type: Print (hardcover & paperback)
- ISBN: 978-1803512266

Absence is a 2025 debut novel by British author Issa Quincy. The novel was published by Granta and Two Dollar Radio.

The novel follows an unnamed narrator whose life is shaped by interconnected stories of loss and remembrance, exploring how absence influences memory, identity, and human relationships.

== Plot ==
The narrative centers on an unnamed figure whose perspective emerges through recollection and observation, unfolding in a sequence of loosely connected episodes rather than a continuous storyline. These episodes span multiple locations and eras, emphasizing discontinuity and reflection over chronological progression.

Throughout the text, the narrator recounts encounters with individuals marked by disappearance or estrangement, such as a former teacher burdened by secrecy, a woman who annually commemorates her vanished brother, and relatives whose relationships persist through correspondence and memory. A recurring poem functions as a unifying motif.

== Themes ==
Brock Kingsley of The Chicago Review of Books argued that "idea of saudade is a determining characteristic" of the novel, saying that the novel "explores the hollow spaces carved out by grief, identity, and memory." In an interview with Write or Die Magazine, Quincy stated that "I see memory as mutation. It is not a set of static images, sounds, or smells but a series of growths, if you will, that sprout off an originating experience. One need not strain for this metamorphosis, it happens naturally. The nesting of narratives is the layering of memory. Though it is not the layers of memory that interest me but the spaces between. Those silences, gaps, lapses, stops not starts, are to me where a more profound meaning is formed."

In an interview with BOMB, Quincy stated that the novel was inspired by Italo Calvino's Marcovaldo, Roberto Bolaño's Antwerp, and W. G. Sebald's The Emigrants. In the same interview, he described that he wrote the first draft of the novel in three weeks, while "shuttling" between four different houses (his own, his partner's, his mother's, and his father's): "I was just drifting for two years between this strange constellation of places. A lot of that wandering spirit bled into the work of Absence."

== Reception ==
Publishers Weekly reviewed the novel positively, saying that "beautifully explores the ways in which his characters are affected by resurfaced memories... Readers of W.G. Sebald will find much to enjoy." Max Callimanopulos of the Harvard Review also compared the novel to the works of W. G. Sebald, applauding the novel for being thoughtful and having an international scope, but criticised the novel for its style.

Kanyin Ajayi of The Massachusetts Review praised the novel, writing it was "full of imaginative empathy and marked by its breadth, its multivocality, and its truth," calling it "a wonderful debut." Literary Hub listed the novel as one of its "100 Notable Small Press Books" of 2025, calling it "a debut that is, in a word, memorable."
