= Santiago Otheguy =

Argentine film director (born 1973)

Santiago Otheguy (born January 29, 1973, in Buenos Aires) is a film director from Argentina.

== Filmography ==
- Drug Scenes (2000)
- La León (2007)
