= Marco Berger =

Argentine film director and screenwriter (born 1977)

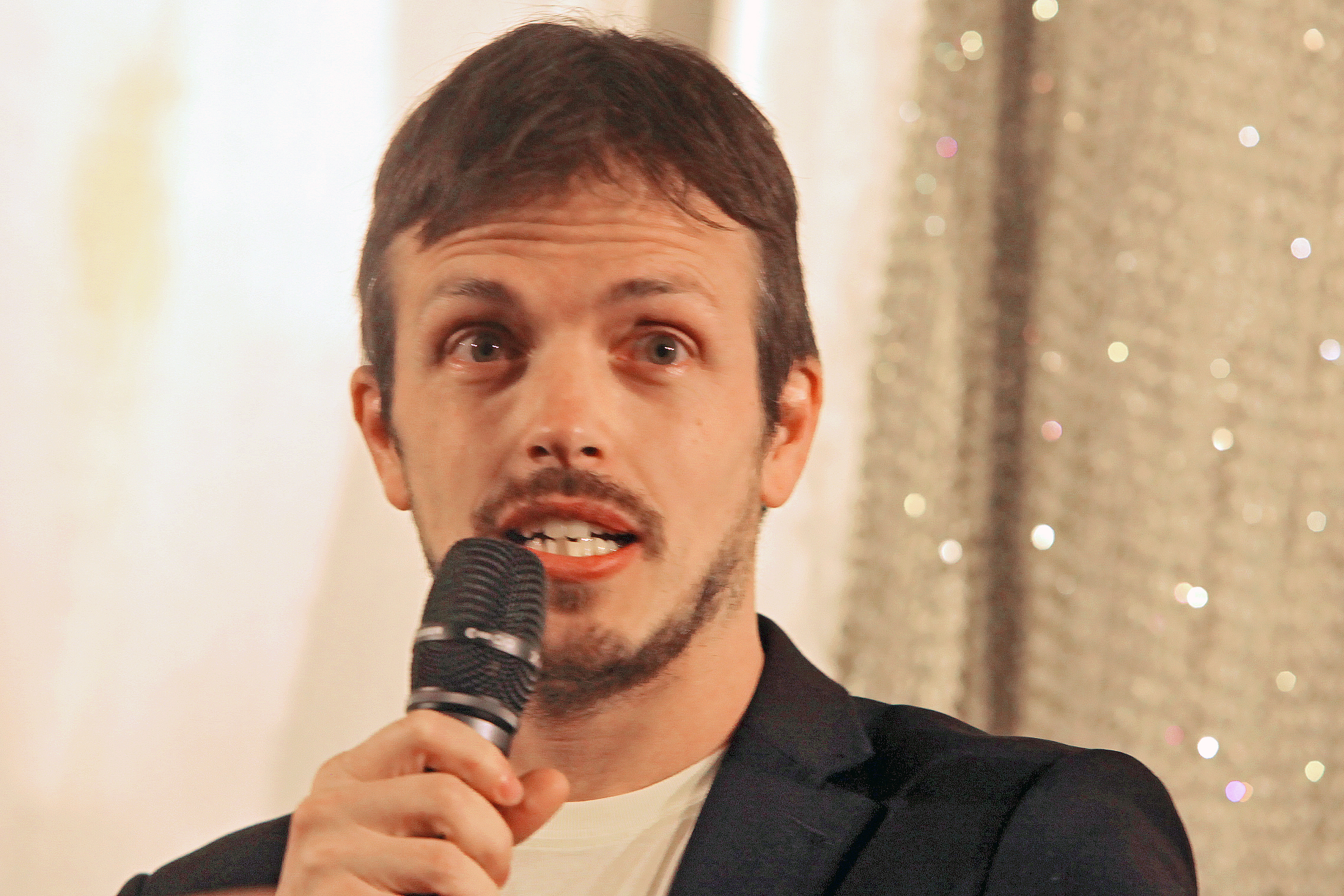
- Marco Berger at the 65th Berlinale in February 2015
- Born: December 8, 1977 (age 48); Buenos Aires, Argentina
- Education: Universidad del Cine
- Occupations: Film director, Screenwriter
- Notable work: Plan B, Absent, Hawaii, Butterfly
- Awards: Teddy Award for Best Feature Film (2011)

Marco Berger (born 8 December 1977) is an Argentine film director and screenwriter. He is known for films such as Plan B and Absent.

== Biography ==
Marco Berger studied at the Universidad del Cine in Buenos Aires and made his debut as a director in 2008 with the short films La última voluntad and El reloj, the latter selected for the Cannes Film Festival. His first feature film, Plan B (2009), was presented at numerous festivals.

With the film Absent (Ausente), he won the Teddy Award for Best Feature Film at the 2011 Berlin International Film Festival. The jury described his work as "an original screenplay, with an innovative aesthetic and a sophisticated approach that creates dynamism. A unique combination of homoerotic desire, suspense, and dramatic tension."

Between 2013 and 2015 he produced two more films: Hawaii and Butterfly (Mariposa), winner of the Best Latin American Film category at the San Sebastián International Film Festival in Spain.

In 2016 he shot his fifth feature film, Taekwondo, in collaboration with filmmaker Martín Farina.

Berger is openly homosexual, and all his films deal with LGBT themes and conflicts, and he is considered one of the leading exponents of the genre today. His artistic hallmark is the exploration of silence on screen, focusing on the gestures and gazes of the characters, rather than dialogue.

Throughout his career, he has also participated as a collaborator in other film productions, such as the two volumes of the Sexual Tension series.

== Filmography ==
=== Films ===
- Plan B - 2009
- Absent (Ausente) - 2011
- Hawaii - 2013
- Butterfly (Mariposa) - 2015
- Taekwondo - 2016, with Martin Farina
- The Blonde One (Un rubio) -2019
- Young Hunter (El cazador) - 2020
- The Carnival (Gualeguaychú: El país del carnaval) - 2021
- Horseplay (Los agitadores) - 2023
- The Astronaut Lovers (Los amantes astronautas) - 2024
- Perro Perro - 2025

=== Collaborations ===
- Cinco (2010) – with Cinthia Varela, Cecilia del Valle, Andrew Sala and Francisco Forbes
- Tensión sexual, Volumen 1: Volátil – with Marcelo Mónaco
- Tensión sexual, Volumen 2: Violetas – with Marcelo Mónaco
- Taekwondo (2016) – jointly directed with Martín Farina

=== Shorts ===
- Una última voluntad (2007)
- El reloj (2008)
- El Primo (2012)
- El intercambio (2023)

=== Other works ===
- Fulboy (2014) as editor

== Awards ==
In 2011, Berger won the Teddy Award for Best Feature Film at the Berlin International Film Festival for his film Ausente.

== Personal life and career ==
Marco Berger is gay. His film examines male desire and challenges rigid distinctions between gay and straight identities, presenting sexuality as more fluid. Berger began studying theatre arts at the age of fifteen and has credited his extensive exposure to films as an influence on his decision to pursue a career in the arts.

== See also ==
- "Berger shot"
