= Taekwondo (film) =

2016 Argentine dramedy film

- Theatrical film poster
- Directed by: Marco Berger; Martín Farina
- Written by: Marco Berger
- Produced by: Marco Berger; Martín Farina
- Starring: Gabriel Epstein; Lucas Papa; Juan Manuel Martino; Andrés Gavaldá; Gaston Re
- Cinematography: Martín Farina
- Edited by: Marco Berger
- Music by: Pedro Irusta
- Release dates: April 16, 2016 (Buenos Aires); August 18, 2016 (Argentina)
- Running time: 112 mins.
- Country: Argentina
- Language: Spanish

Taekwondo is a 2016 Argentine independent erotic dramedy film written by Marco Berger, who co-directed with Martín Farina. The film stars an ensemble cast, featuring Gabriel Epstein, Lucas Papa, and Juan Manuel Martino, et al. It premiered at the Buenos Aires International Festival of Independent Cinema in 2016, before a limited theatrical release throughout Argentina later that year.

== Synopsis ==
A man invites another guy he trains with to spend some time in his country house among other, often fully naked, male friends.

== Cast ==
- Gabriel Epstein as Germán
- Lucas Papa as Fer
- Juan Manuel Martino as Fede
- Andrés Gavaldá as Juan
- Gaston Re as Diego
- Francisco Bertín as Leo
- Nicolás Barsoff as Lucho
- Arturo Frutos as Maxi
- Darío Miño as Tomás
- Christian Chapi as Sebas

== Reception ==
Ben Turner of The Pink Lens praised the pacing: "Plot-wise, this is one of those films where not a lot really happens, but the inordinate quantities of sexual tensions in the will-they/won't-they relationship-tease is enough to make it feel a lot pacier than it actually is." Diego Batlle of Otrocinés appreciated the focus on norms and subliminal messages: "It naturally describes a world of male codes, overacted manliness and permanent sexual tension." Zachary Wild of The Rectangular View rated it 3/5 starts, stating: "If you like movies about male bonding that are more about theme than story, then [this film] is a good choice."

Gary M. Kramer of the San Francisco Bay Times lauded the erotica catered to a gay audience: "[The film] is a leisurely-paced film that lets viewers bask in its hazy homoeroticism. For folks not seduced by the hothouse atmosphere, the film can be a bit soporific. But for anyone who succumbs to the film’s sensual rhythms, it will be a stimulating experience." Alexander Ryll of Gay Essential concurred with that sentiment: "This is a significant film in today's landscape of overbearing heteronormativity as it deals with the rather delicate topic of being comfortable as a gay man without having to give disclaimers or explanations."
