= La León =

2007 Argentine movie

- Directed by: Santiago Otheguy
- Written by: Santiago Otheguy
- Produced by: Catherine Bara; Pierre Rambaldi; Juan Solanas; Gonzalo Rodríguez Rubis; Pablo Salomon; Aton Soumache; Alexis Vonarb
- Starring: Jorge Román; Daniel Valenzuela
- Cinematography: Paula Grandio
- Edited by: Valeria Otheguy; Sebastián Sepúlveda
- Music by: Vincent Artaud
- Production companies: Onyx Films; Big World; Polar Films; Morocha Films; Mandragona Producciones
- Distributed by: MK2 Diffusion
- Release date: February 11, 2007 (Berlin International Film Festival)
- Running time: 80 minutes
- Countries: Argentina; France
- Language: Spanish

La León is a 2007 Argentine drama written and directed by Santiago Otheguy. Set in Northern Argentina, the film tells the story of a homosexual fieldworker, Álvaro (Jorge Román), and his relationship with a local bully, El Turu (Daniel Valenzuela). On its release the film received average reviews and won a Teddy Award.

== Plot ==
On an island in the Paraná Delta of Argentina, Álvaro (Román) works as a fisherman and a reed cutter. His homosexuality and love of books make him an outsider in the small village. The brutish El Turu (Valenzuela) captains La León, the town ferry. He views Álvaro as a threat, bullying him almost constantly. However, as the film progresses, El Turu's hidden attraction to Álvaro becomes obvious.

== Cast ==
- Jorge Román as Álvaro
- Daniel Valenzuela as El Turu.
- José Muñoz as Iribarren
- Alfredo Rivas as Misionero I
- Juan Carlos Rivas as Misionero II
- Mirta Duran Rivas as Mujer misionera
- Esteban Gonzalez as Hermano misionero I
- Alberto Rivas as Hermano misionero III
- Mirta Rivas as Hermana Misionera
- Lorena Rivas as Nina misionera
- Aida Merel as Bibliotecaria
- Diego Quiroz as Marinaro Julio
- Mariano González as Joven del Yate
- Marcos Woinsky as El Alemán
- Jimena Cavaco as Laura
- Elba Estela Vargas as Madre de Laura
- José Aguilar as Jornalero
- Ignacio Jiménez as Chico Lopez
- Pedro Rossi as Vendedor del Astillero
- Daniel Sosa as Gadea Padre
- Ana Maria Montalyo as Gadea Madre
- Hernan Sosa as El Muerto
- Leonardo Rodríguez as Hermano de Laura

== Awards ==
- La León was awarded the 2007 Teddy Award at the Berlin International Film Festival.
