= Absent (2011 film) =

2011 film

- Theatrical release poster
- Spanish: Ausente
- Directed by: Marco Berger
- Written by: Marco Berger
- Produced by: Marco Berger, Mariana Contreras & Pablo Ingercher Casas (executive producers)
- Starring: Carlos Echevarría; Javier De Pietro
- Cinematography: Tomas Perez Silva
- Edited by: Marco Berger
- Music by: Pedro Irusta
- Release dates: February 13, 2011 (Berlinale); August 11, 2011 (Argentina)
- Running time: 90 minutes
- Country: Argentina
- Language: Spanish

Absent (Spanish: Ausente) is a 2011 Spanish-language romantic thriller film directed by Argentine director Marco Berger. The film centers on a recently engaged, 30-something male swimming instructor who is thrown into emotional turmoil as he repress his desire for his 16-year-old male student, who shows sexual interest in him, and engages in overt advances towards him.

== Synopsis ==
The story is told by Sebastián (Carlos Echevarría), a high school sports coach who becomes the object of student and athlete Martín's (Javier De Pietro) affection. Sebastián tries to keep Martín at a distance, but at the same time, wants to be kind and nurturing. Martín goes to great lengths in his attempt to get closer to his coach. When Martín injures his eye during swimming, Sebastián initially takes him to the hospital; after treatment, Sebastián offers Martín a ride home. However, Martín was supposed to spend the night at a friend's house, so no one is expecting him to come home that night, thus he spends the night at Sebastián's house. Things come to a head when Sebastián realizes that he was being lied to, and punches Martín in the face. He is not angry from disgust or for being the object of Martín's desire, but rather because Martín's dishonesty could potentially cost the coach his job, or worse. Offended and feelings rejected, Martín taunts his teacher, telling him to call the police and suggesting it would cause greater problems. Later, Martín accidentally falls from a roof to his death after retrieving a neighbor's football, and Sebastián finds himself filled with remorse.

== Style ==
The director is vague on certain plot points; the last images, for example, portray Sebastián gently kissing Martín on the lips. It is not made clear whether this actually happened, is a memory, or only occurred in one of their imaginations. It is also unclear whether or not Martín accidentally fell to his death, or whether it was suicide, driven by his teacher's rejection. The viewer is kept contemplating if a romantic relationship had occurred, and if it did, if it is immoral in itself, regardless of age differences or one-sided pressure.

== Reception ==
When the film won the "Teddy Award for Best Feature" by the Teddy Award Independent Jury at the Berlin International Film Festival (Berlinale), the judging committee praised it as a film with "an original screenplay, an innovative aesthetic and a sophisticated approach, which creates dynamism. A unique combination of homoerotic desire, suspense and dramatic tension."

During the Berlinale, The Hollywood Reporter published a review stating: "Despite its original twist on the tired pedophilia topic, Absent skirts the fringes of dull and would be commercially dismissable, were it not for the edgy mixing job and hyped-up soundtrack that together create a sense of artificial excitement. (...) The small cast is well-chosen and de Pietro, in his first film role, is a real discovery who opens up his character of Martin in ever surprising ways."

== Cast ==
- Carlos Echevarría as Sebastián
- Javier De Pietro as Martín
- Antonella Costa as Mariana
- Rocío Pavón as Analía
- Alejandro Barbero as Juan Pablo

== Awards and nominations ==
- 2011: The film won the Teddy Awards for "Best feature film" at the Berlin International Film Festival
- 2011: The actor Javier De Pietro was nominated for "Best New Actor" for his role Martín in the film during the Argentine Academy of Cinematography Arts and Sciences Awards

== See also ==
- Hawaii (2013 film)
- Plan B (2009 film)
