= Plan B (2009 film) =

2009 Argentine movie

- Theatrical release poster
- Directed by: Marco Berger
- Written by: Marco Berger
- Produced by: Martín Cuinat
- Starring: Manuel Vignau; Lucas Ferraro; Mercedes Quinteros
- Cinematography: Tomas Perez Silva
- Edited by: Marco Berger
- Music by: Pedro Irusta
- Release dates: March 27, 2009 (Buenos Aires Festival); March 3, 2011 (Argentina)
- Running time: 106 minutes
- Country: Argentina
- Language: Spanish

Plan B is a 2009 Argentine comedy-drama film directed by Marco Berger.

== Plot ==
Bruno (Manuel Vignau), after seeing his former girlfriend Laura (Mercedes Quinteros) happily together with a new boyfriend named Pablo (Lucas Ferraro), grows jealous and starts plotting to win her back with his friend Victor serving as a partner in crime and a sounding board for his plans. He initially plans to sleep with Laura behind Pablo's back and convince her to get back together with him but when that plan fails and he hears that Pablo has slept with another man in the past, he comes up with a "Plan B" of seducing Pablo and getting him to break up with Laura.

Bruno easily develops a friendship with Pablo, bonding with him over common interests and memories from their youth. He then starts to push the boundaries of their friendship, kissing Pablo on a dare from his friend Ana and then on a made-up excuse of needing practice for an acting role. His plan succeeds in getting Pablo to gradually fall for him, but it becomes apparent at the same time that his own feelings for Pablo have grown stronger than he planned for.

Eventually, Pablo learns about Bruno's plan and is heartbroken. He awkwardly tries to have sex with Bruno but then backs out of it and calls off their friendship. Despite now being free to resume his relationship with Laura, Bruno ultimately breaks up with her and confesses his love to Pablo. Pablo, in return, shows Bruno that he kept a photo of him in his lost wallet, implying that he was attracted to Bruno even before Bruno began his Plan B. The film ends with them kissing and heading off to the bedroom together.

== Cast ==
- Manuel Vignau as Bruno
- Lucas Ferraro as Pablo
- Mercedes Quinteros as Laura
- Damián Canduci as Victor
- Ana Lucia Antony as Ana
- Carolina Stegmayer as Verónica
- Antonia De Michelis as Madre Victor
- Ariel Nuñez Di Croce as Javier
- Khaled El nabawy as Adel Abdelaziz

== Screenings ==
The film was an official selection at the Buenos Aires International Festival of Independent Cinema (BAFICI), at The Rome International Film Festival, BFI London Film Festival, and films festivals in Havana, Palm Springs, Bilbao, Toulouse, Amsterdam and Melbourne.
